= Statue of Marcus Whitman =

Statue by Avard Fairbanks

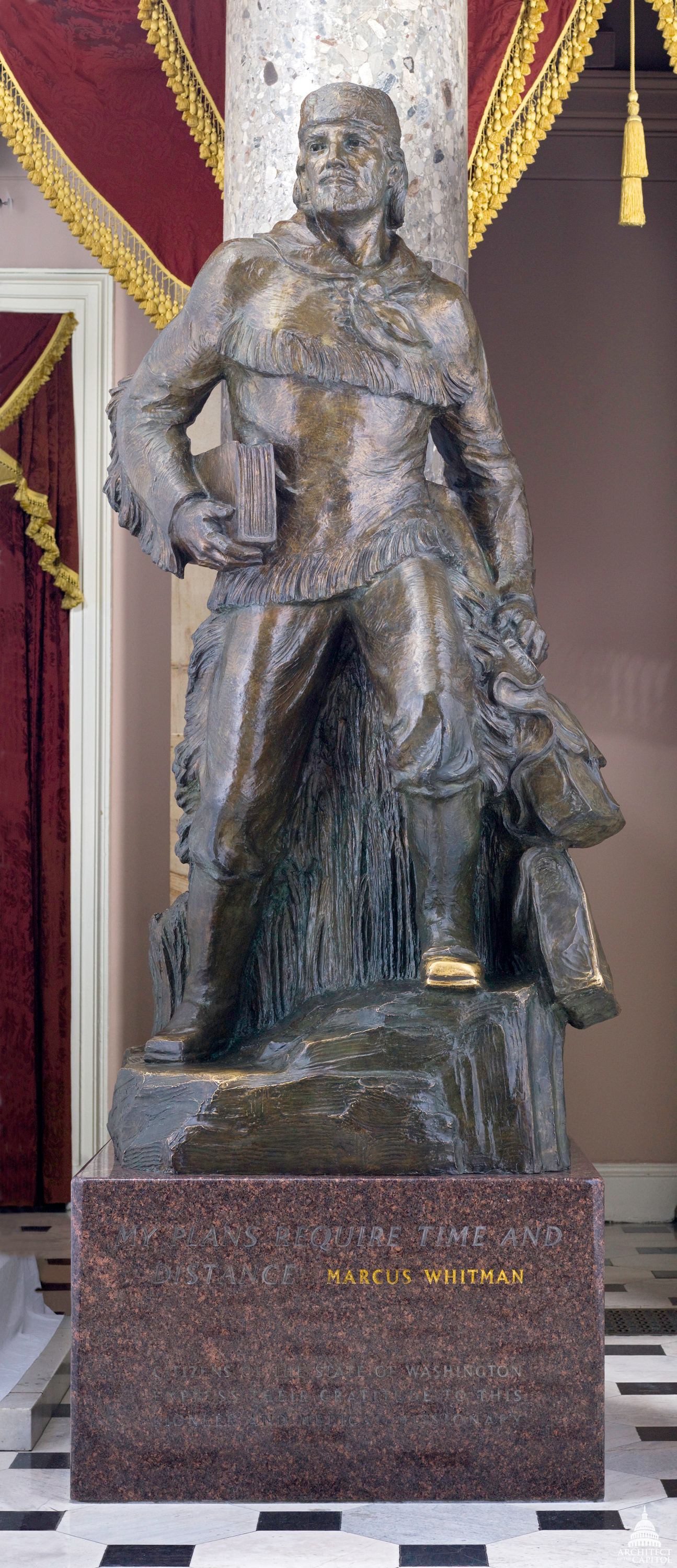
- Artist: Avard Fairbanks
- Medium: Bronze sculpture
- Subject: Marcus Whitman
- Location: Washington, D.C., United States

Marcus Whitman is a 4/3 life-size bronze sculpture by Avard Fairbanks that depicts the American physician, missionary and frontiersman Dr. Marcus Whitman striding resolutely into the future, holding a Bible in one hand and saddlebags and a scroll in the other hand. It was gifted by the U.S. state of Washington to the United States Capitol's National Statuary Hall, in Washington, D.C., as part of the National Statuary Hall Collection and was unveiled and dedicated there on May 22, 1953.

A 2/3 life-size plaster model was given to Whitman College in Walla Walla, Washington in the 1950s; and it currently resides indoors at the Fort Walla Walla Museum in Walla Walla.

A 4/3 life-size bronze statue copy resides indoors at the Washington State Capitol Building in Olympia, Washington.

Another 4/3 life-size bronze statue copy resides outdoors on the western edge of Whitman College on Main Street & Boyer Avenue in Walla Walla.
