= Hiram Straight =

American farmer and legislator in present-day Oregon

Hiram A. Straight

Member of the Oregon Territorial Legislature
- In office 1845–1846
- Constituency: Clackamas District

Member of the Oregon Territorial Legislature
- In office 1855–1856
- Constituency: Clackamas County

Personal details
- Born: March 7, 1814 Washington County, New York
- Died: January 8, 1897 (aged 82) Canemah, Oregon
- Party: Democrat
- Spouse: Susan Lasswell

Hiram Aldrich Straight (March 7, 1814 – January 8, 1897) was an American farmer and legislator in what became the state of Oregon. A native of New York state, he would live in Iowa before traveling the Oregon Trail to what was then the Oregon Country. In Oregon, he would serve in the Provisional Legislature of Oregon and the Oregon Territorial Legislature.

== Early life ==
Hiram Straight was born on March 7, 1814, in Washington County, New York, to Lydia Fanning Straight and Elisha Straight. By 1838 he moved to Iowa Territory where he married Susan Lasswell (born in 1817) near the town of Burlington. The couple would have seven children together, including George, Julia, Cyrus Branson, Mary Etta, Jane, Hiram Jr., and John. In 1843, Straight and the family would take the Oregon Trail to what was then the Oregon Country, arriving at Oregon City, Oregon.

== Oregon ==
The Straight family settled on 600 acres (2.4 km^{2}) at the mouth of Abernethy Creek on the Clackamas River. There he farmed this land that would later become his donation land claim, and was a member of the Oregon Lyceum in Oregon City. In 1845 and 1846, Straight was elected to and served in the Provisional Legislature of Oregon representing the Clackamas District, now Clackamas County, Oregon. In 1846, the Oregon boundary dispute was settled and in 1848 the region south of the 49th degree became the Oregon Territory. In 1850, Straight served on the jury that convicted five members of the Cayuse tribe of murder and sentenced them to death for their role in the Whitman Massacre. He was the foreman of the jury in this trial that had followed the Cayuse War; see Cayuse Five

Straight was elected to the Oregon Territorial Legislature 1855 for the 1855 to 1856 session. He served for that single session as a member of the Democratic Party representing Clackamas County. Hiram Straight continued to farm until his death on January 8, 1897, at the age of 82 at Canemah, which is now within Oregon City. He was buried at the family’s private cemetery in Clackamas County along with his wife. The 19-plot cemetery is one of 800 historic cemeteries in Oregon. The family home, built in 1856, is still standing.
