= Tiloukaikt =

Cayuse leader (d. 1850)

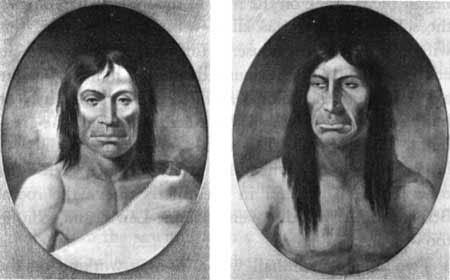
Tiloukaikt and Tomahas, Cayuse chiefs

Tiloukaikt (also Tilokaikt or Teelonkike) (d.1850) was a Native American leader of the Cayuse tribe in the northwestern United States. He was involved in the Whitman Massacre and was a primary leader during the subsequent Cayuse War.

The Cayuse, and their neighbors the Nez Percé, identified the Walla Walla Valley of the Oregon territory as their primary homeland. When approached by Presbyterian missionary Marcus Whitman in 1835, Tiloukaikt and other Cayuse leaders consented to the establishment of a mission in the valley. Sometime later, Whitman and his wife Narcissa created the mission and school at Waiilatpu, in the Walla Walla Valley. A number of Cayuse children attended the school and were taught by Narcissa Whitman. The mission served as a way station for travelers along the Oregon Trail.

Early relations between the Cayuse and Nez Perce and the missionaries throughout the region were generally peaceful. However, tensions between Roman Catholic and Protestant missionaries and the increasing number of white adventurers and settlers in the territory led to misunderstandings and disagreements.

The growing white population also brought disease to the Pacific northwest and its native peoples. Measles and scarlet fever broke out among both white and native populations. Whitman, a trained physician, treated both Indians and whites. However, due to the lack of immunity in the native population, more Indians than whites died. When the number of dead Cayuse children began to rise, some Cayuse became suspicious that Whitman was poisoning his patients rather than treating them. Contemporary accounts suggest that some white settlers encouraged the Cayuse in this belief.

During a measles epidemic in 1847, suspicion and ill feeling came to a head. During a November 29 visit to the mission for medicine, Tiloukaikt had words with Whitman. While they were talking, a warrior named Tomahas struck Whitman from behind, inflicting several wounds with a tomahawk. Other Cayuse fell on the mission occupants, killing Narcissa Whitman and twelve others. Another fifty three men, women and children were captured and held as hostages.

Settlers in the nearby Willamette Valley, led by fundamentalist clergyman Cornelius Gilliam, raised a volunteer militia for a rescue attempt. A peace commission, headed by Joel Palmer, was established to meet with neighboring tribes in hopes of avoiding an escalation of violence. However, the hostages were actually saved through the actions of Peter Skene Ogden of the Hudson's Bay Company, who negotiated and paid for their release.

However, Gilliam and his militia attacked an encampment of uninvolved Cayuse, which led to a period of violence between the Cayuse and Palouse people and the settlers and militia. This became known as the Cayuse War. Eventually, the white militia withdrew and the area settled into an uneasy peace. However, if a real peace was to be established, white settlers demanded that those who had killed Whitman and the other mission residents should be punished. Two years later, five Cayuse, including Tiloukaikt, surrendered. They were taken to Oregon City, tried and sentenced to hang; see Cayuse Five. Before his execution on June 3, 1850, Tiloukaikt accepted Catholic last rites while refusing to deal with the Presbyterian missionaries. Defiant and angry, Tiloukaikt spoke on the gallows, "Did not your missionaries teach us that Christ died to save his people? So we die to save our people."

The death of the five Cayuse did not significantly reduce tensions in the area. Raids, initiated by both whites and natives, continued. Eventually, most surviving Cayuse left the Walla Walla area and joined neighboring tribes including the Nez Perce, Umatilla and Yakama.

== See also ==
- List of people executed in Oregon (pre-1972)
