= Samuel Parker (missionary) =

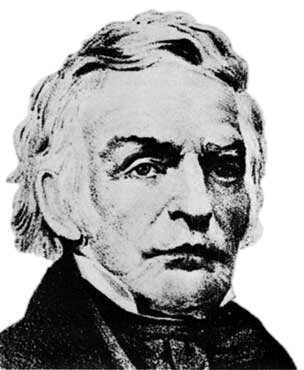
- Born: April 23, 1779; Ashfield, Massachusetts
- Died: March 21, 1866 (aged 86); New York
- Occupation: Missionary
- Spouses: N. Sears; Jerusha Lord

Samuel Parker (1779–1866) was an American missionary in the Pacific Northwest. He was the first Presbyterian minister in the region. He scouted locations for potential missions with Marcus Whitman among the Liksiyu and Niimíipu nations in 1835.

== Early life ==
Samuel Parker was born on April 23, 1779, in Ashfield, Massachusetts, to Thankful Merchant Parker and Elisha Parker. He was educated on the East Coast where he graduated in 1806 from Williams College, and in 1810 from Andover Theological Seminary. Parker was ordained as a minister in 1812, and then taught and preached in New York until 1833. There he married his first wife, Miss N. Sears, and in 1815 he married a second time to Jerusha Lord, with whom he would father three children. One son's name was Samuel J. Parker.

== Missionary ==
In 1834 Parker answered a call for missionaries to move to the American West brought about by four Flathead tribesmen asking William Clark for religious guidance. In 1835, he traveled west with fellow missionary Marcus Whitman. After preaching at the Green River rendezvous of the American Fur Company, Parker continued west while Whitman returned east. During the winter of 1835 to 1836, Parker was a guest at the Hudson's Bay Company's fur trade outpost on the Columbia River, Fort Vancouver. He was then the first Presbyterian missionary in what later became the state of Oregon. Parker then sought out locations for the establishment of missions in the region. He traveled through the Willamette Valley and Lower Columbia Valley to select sites that were later used by the missionaries of the American Board for Foreign Missions, including what became the Waiilatpu Mission. Parker then left the region by ship, sailing first to the Sandwich Islands and then around Cape Horn to the Eastern Seaboard.

== Later life ==
Parker returned to New York and informed the board of the best sites for missions. He was then rejected for missionary work for the board due to his advanced age. He published a book in 1838 describing his journey to Oregon, Journal of an Exploring Tour Beyond the Rocky Mountains. Parker died on March 21, 1866, and is buried in Ithaca, New York.
