= Cayuse Five =

Native Americans hanged for murder in 1850

The Cayuse Five were five members of the Cayuse who were executed for murder in 1850 following an attack on a mission settlement near present-day Walla Walla, Washington. Their names were Clokomas, Isiaasheluckas, Kiamasumkin, Telakite, and Tomahas, though spellings vary.

The five were charged with murdering the Protestant missionaries Marcus and Narcissa Whitman, and eleven others, in an event known as the Whitman massacre. The massacre occurred at a time when the Cayuse had suffered many deaths in a measles epidemic, and survivors suspected that the Whitmans were complicit.

The trial began on May 21, 1850, in a tavern in Oregon City. All five were convicted and executed by hanging.

== Background ==
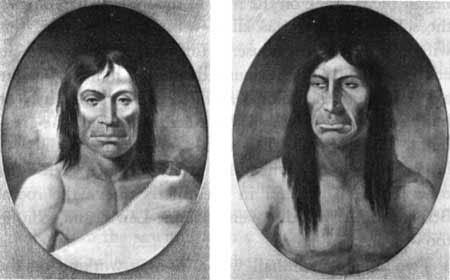
Tiloukaikt and Tomahas, both defendants

=== 1824 to 1836 ===
In 1824, John McLoughlin and his wife Marguerite moved to the Pacific Northwest, aiming to make money off the fur trade. They became known for heading Fort Vancouver in Vancouver, Washington, across the Columbia River from what is now Portland, Oregon. This was a post in a select spot, with tens of thousands in nearby Native American communities, plus it was at the center of important trade routes connecting to the Columbia River. Marguerite was half Ojibwe or Cree, and half Swiss.

Twelve years later in 1836, in Walla Walla, five people, Narcissa Whitman, her husband Marcus Whitman, Reverend Henry and Eliza Spalding, and William H. Gray established the Whitman Mission to convert the Cayuse to Christianity.

== Tension grows, violence erupts ==
=== Early 1840s to 1847, the Whitman massacre ===
In the mid-1840s, American settlers began to arrive at Fort Vancouver, coming in on the Oregon Trail. Due to the flood of white immigrants, John McLoughlin found himself in a tight spot.

Travelling Americans often carried measles and other foreign diseases to which the Cayuse had no natural immunity. Cayuse children died of diseases such as measles far more often than the sick white children who came to the Whitman Mission for treatment.

Tensions erupted 1847 when the Cayuse attacked the Whitman Mission, see Whitman massacre. According to Cayuse tradition, there was no question of their right to dispose of a doctor (medicine man, or tewat) whose patients were dying of disease. In the eyes of the Cayuse, Whitman was a "healer but couldn't heal."

In the Whitman Incident, Cayuse warriors killed Marcus Whitman and thirteen others, including Narcissa Whitman. For one month they held 49 survivors captive at the Whitman Mission. Arriving whites trusted the Cayuse even less.

=== 1847 to 1850, the conclusion ===
Following the battle at the Whitman Mission, for two years a troop of 500 volunteer soldiers chased the Cayuse tribe; see Cayuse War. Tired of fleeing, the Cayuse gave up five of their men in order to make peace. Likely these five had not been involved in the attack on the Whitman Mission, but the Americans demanded five for punishment.

They were arrested and tried by jury in Oregon City; crowded with a few hundred onlookers, the trial was held in a tavern. The judge Orville C. Pratt rejected defense arguments that the killings agreed with Cayuse law, as well as that the attack occurred before the Oregon territorial government was founded. They were hanged in 1850, buried near Oregon City. Before hanging, the one named Tomahas is reported to have said, "Much like your savior Jesus Christ gave himself for you, we are giving ourselves up for our people in order to stop the Cayuse War." The five men were executed on June 3, 1850, and the location of their graves is unknown.

== See also ==
- Cayuse, Oregon
- Cayuse War
- Oregon Rifles
- Tiloukaikt
- Whitman Mission National Historic Site

== External links and references ==
- An article in an Oregon newspaper
- A newspaper article
- A step towards healing: Repatriating the Cayuse Five; author offers theory on gravesite location
- The Whitman reckoning: A missionary’s tale unravels amid a national awakening over racism
