= Orville C. Pratt =

American judge

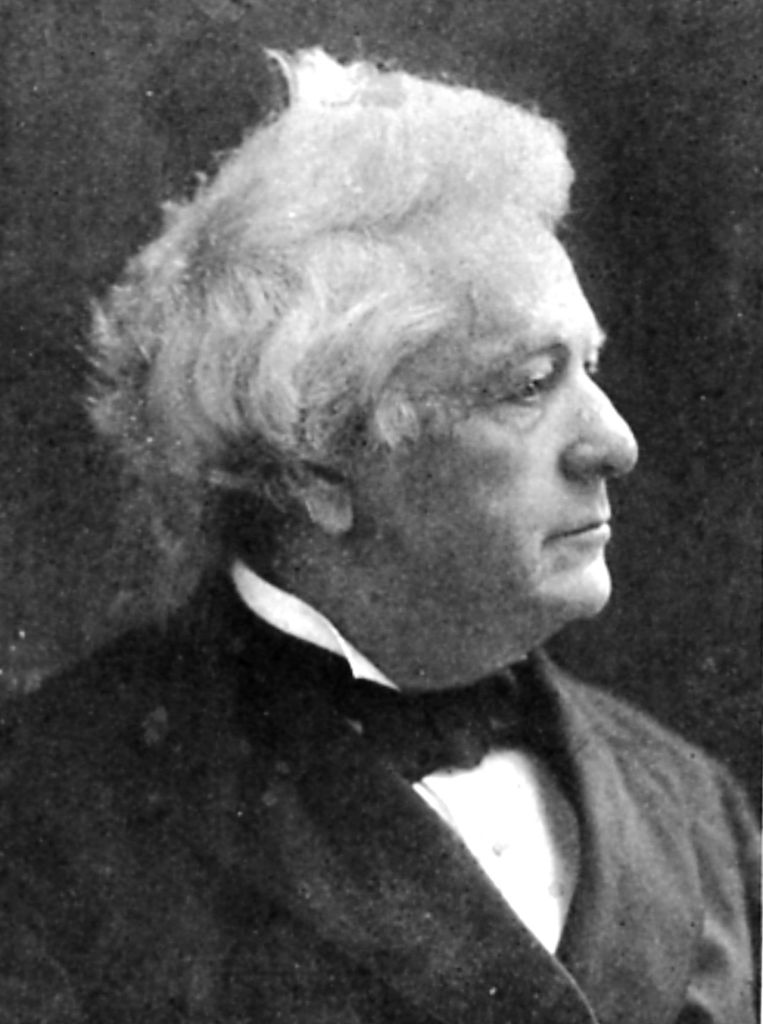

2nd Justice of the Oregon Supreme Court
- In office 1848–1852
- Appointed by: James K. Polk
- Preceded by: new position
- Succeeded by: George Henry Williams

Personal details
- Born: April 24, 1819 Ontario County, New York, U.S.
- Died: October 1891 (aged 72) San Francisco, California, U.S.

Orville Charles Pratt (April 24, 1819 – October 1891) was an American jurist and attorney. He served as the 2nd Associate Justice of the Oregon Supreme Court serving from 1848 to 1852. He wrote the lone dissenting opinion in the controversy over the Oregon Territory’s capital between Oregon City and Salem.

== Early life ==
Pratt was born on April 24, 1819, in Rushville, Ontario County, New York. In New York he attended the Army Academy at West Point from 1837 to 1839. He then studied law in Rochester, New York, earning admission to the state bar in 1841. Pratt then moved to Galena, Illinois, and set up practice in 1843.

== Oregon ==
In 1849, Pratt moved to Oregon to assume the position of judge on the Oregon Supreme Court. When he arrived he was the lone justice, so he exercised all of the judiciary’s powers from April 1849 until William Strong arrived 18 months later. Pratt was appointed to the position by President Polk. Then in 1852 when Franklin Pierce became President Pratt was removed as judge, and when he was nominated to become chief justice of the Oregon court Stephen A. Douglas opposed the nomination and Pratt lost the nomination to George Henry Williams.

While in office Pratt was controversial, and was the judge during the controversial case of the Cayuse Five. He was known for traveling outside of the territory for his own personal gain, and took every opportunity to advance his personal, business, and political goals. During the dispute over the location of the capital in the territory, he took the minority position of choosing Salem, ultimately Congress would decide the matter in Salem’s favor in 1852. After leaving the court he was a judge of admiralty in Portland, Oregon, in 1855 to 1856. He also practiced law with Alexander Campbell after failing to receiving a political office. Pratt then tried to get the money from the Ewing Young estate, but ultimately the Oregon Territorial Legislature and the Oregon Supreme Court denied the payment of the funds.

== Later years ==
In 1856, Pratt moved to San Francisco. There he owned the 18-square-mile (47 km^{2}) Rancho Aguas Frias and had a fortune estimated at over $1 million. In California, Pratt practiced law in a partnership with Alex Campbell before being elected as judge of the twelfth judicial district. While in that office, he ruled in favor of Charlotte L. Brown in her lawsuit against a San Francisco streetcar company after she was ejected for being African-American, helping to end what he termed the "barbaric practice" of racial segregation. He was divorced in 1877, losing $750,000 ($15.5 million as measured in 2014 dollars) in the divorce settlement. His wife had discovered Pratt was having an affair, and in order to avoid prosecution for adultery he agreed to the large divorce settlement. He then married his former mistress, Eugenia Elizabeth Greene. Later in New York he was involved in a gambling issue where he refused to testify due to self incrimination issues. In 1886, the University of Oregon granted Pratt an honorary doctor of laws degree. Orville C. Pratt died in San Francisco in October 1891.
