= Marcus Whitman =

19th-century American missionary

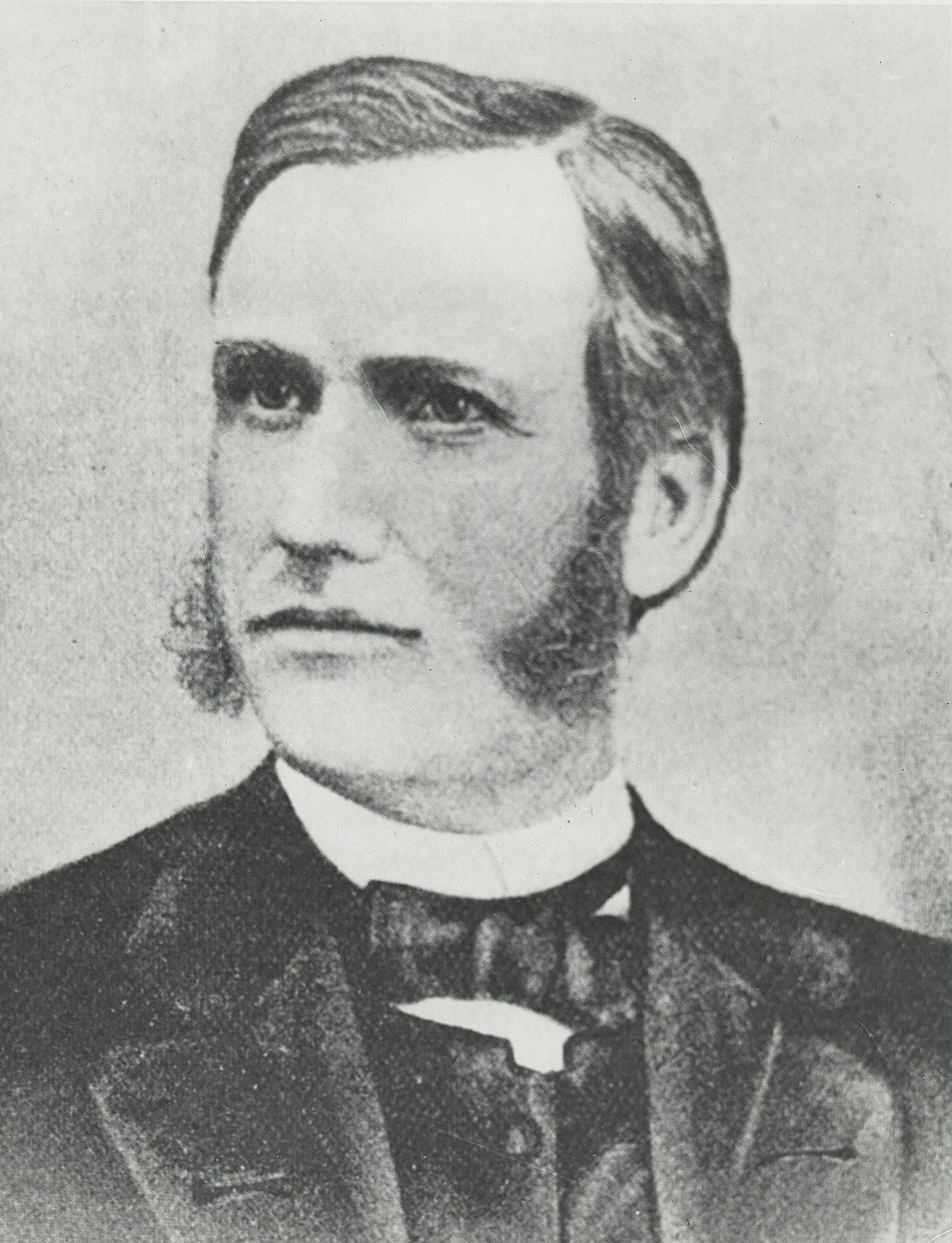
- Born: September 4, 1802; Federal Hollow, New York
- Died: November 29, 1847 (aged 45); Waiilatpu, Oregon Country
- Cause of death: Murder
- Education: Fairfield Medical College
- Spouse: Narcissa Prentiss

Ecclesiastical career
- Church: Presbyterian
- Congregations: Whitman Mission
- Title: Missionary

Marcus Whitman (September 4, 1802 – November 29, 1847) was an American physician and missionary. He is most well known for leading American settlers across the Oregon Trail, unsuccessfully attempting to Christianize the Cayuse Indians, and was subsequently killed by the Cayuse Indians in an event known as the 1847 Whitman massacre, over a misunderstanding, resulting in the beginning of the Cayuse War (1847–1855).

In 1836, Marcus Whitman led an overland party by wagon to the West. He and his wife, Narcissa, along with Reverend Henry Spalding and his wife, Eliza, and William Gray, founded a mission near present-day Walla Walla, Washington in an effort to convert local Indians to Christianity. In the winter of 1842, Whitman went back east, returning the following summer with the first large wagon train of settlers across the Oregon Trail. These new settlers encroached on the Cayuse Indians living near the Whitman Mission and were unsuccessful in their efforts to Christianize the tribe. Following the deaths of many nearby Cayuse from an outbreak of measles, some remaining Cayuse accused Whitman of murder, suggesting that he had administered poison and was a failed shaman. In retaliation, a group of Cayuse killed the Whitmans and eleven other settlers on November 29, 1847, an event that came to be known as the Whitman massacre. This led to continuing warfare between settlers and the Cayuse which reduced their numbers further.

== Early life ==
On September 4, 1802, Whitman was born in Federal Hollow, New York to Beza and Alice Whitman. After Beza's death when Whitman was seven, he was sent to Massachusetts to live with his uncle.

Whitman dreamed of becoming a minister but did not have the money for such schooling. He returned to New York as a young man. He studied medicine for two years with an experienced physician under the form of apprenticeship approved then, and received his degree from Fairfield Medical College in New York. He practiced medicine for a few years in Canada but was interested in going to the west.

== Missionary ==
In 1835, Whitman traveled with the missionary Samuel Parker to present-day northwestern Montana and northern Idaho, to minister to bands of the Flathead and Nez Perce nations. During this journey, he treated several fur trappers during an outbreak of cholera. At the end of their stay, he promised the Nez Perce that he would return with other missionaries and teachers to live with them.

Parker and Whitman were present for the 1835 Rocky Mountain Rendezvous.

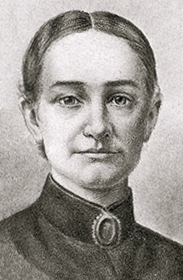
Narcissa Whitman

== Marriage and family ==
In 1836, Whitman married Narcissa Prentiss, a teacher of physics and chemistry. She had also been eager to travel west as a missionary, but she had been unable to do so as a single woman. Their only daughter, Alice Clarissa, born on March 14, 1837, was the first Anglo-American child born in Oregon Country. She was named after her grandmothers but drowned in the Walla Walla River at age two.

As settlers came in increasing numbers, the Whitmans took in eleven orphaned children, including the adoption of the Sager orphans. They also established a kind of boarding school for settlers' children at their mission.

== The way west ==
On May 25, 1836, the Whitmans, and a group of other missionaries including Henry H. Spalding and Eliza Hart Spalding, joined a caravan of fur traders and traveled west. The fur company caravan was led by the mountain men Milton Sublette and Thomas Fitzpatrick. The fur traders had seven covered wagons, each pulled by six mules. An additional cart drawn by two mules carried Milton Sublette, who had lost a leg a year earlier and walked on a "cork" one made by a friend.

The combined group arrived in time for the fur-traders' annual Rocky Mountain Rendezvous.

The group established several missions as well as Whitman's settlement at a Cayuse settlement called Waíilatpu (Why-ee-laht-poo) in the Cayuse language, meaning "People of the Place of the Rye Grass". It was located just west of the northern end of the Blue Mountains. The present-day city of Walla Walla, Washington developed six miles to the east. The settlement was in the territory of both the Cayuse and the Nez Perce tribes. Whitman farmed and provided medical care, while Narcissa set up a school for the Native American children.

In 1842, Whitman traveled east, and on his return, he accompanied the first large group of wagon trains west. Known as the "Great Emigration", the 1843 expedition established the viability of the Oregon Trail for later homesteaders. Not having much success with converting the Cayuse, the Whitmans gave more attention to the settlers. They took in children to their own home and established a boarding school for settlers' children.

== Massacre ==
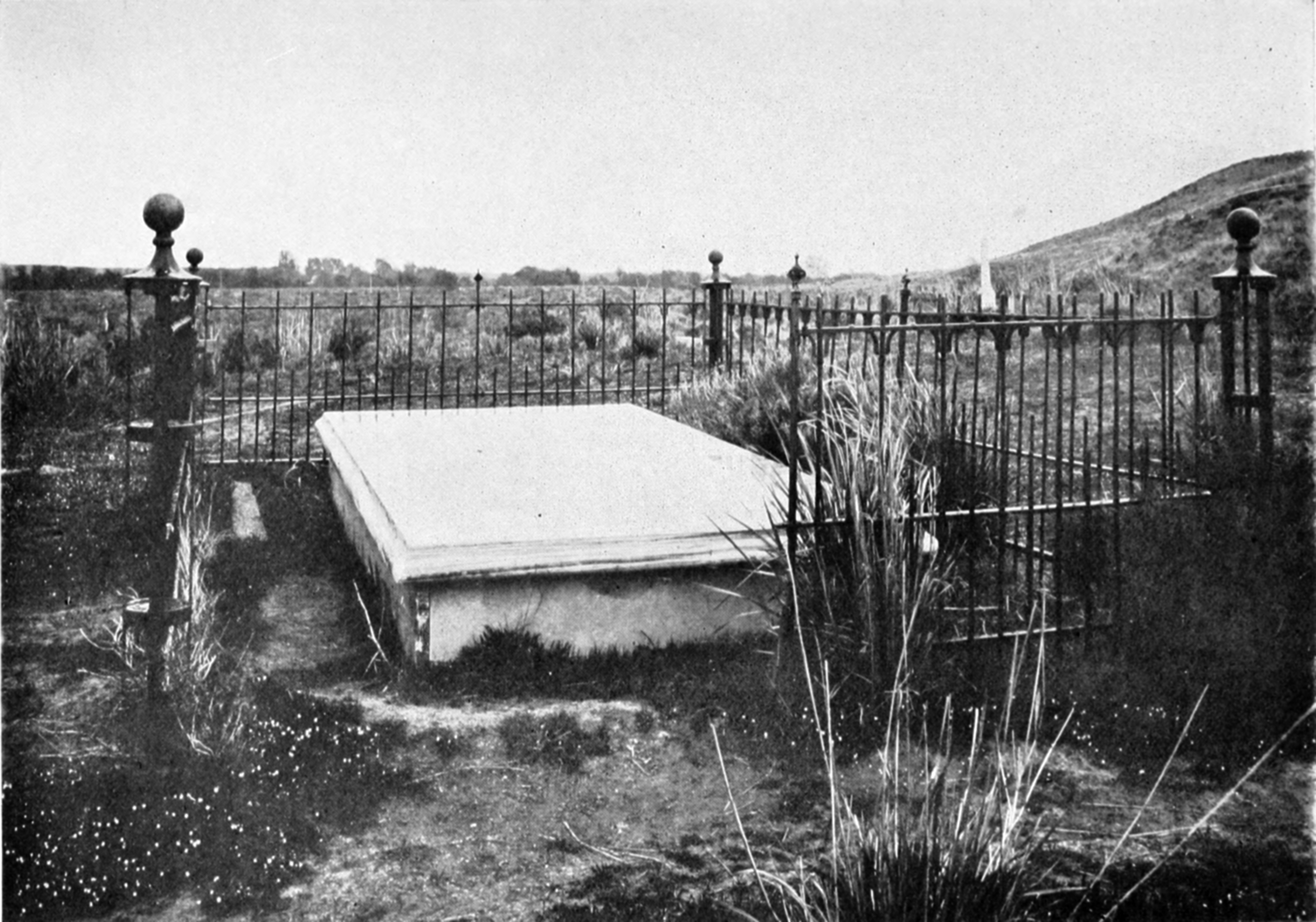
Marcus Whitman's grave in Walla Walla

The Cayuse resented the encroachment of white settlers. More significantly, the influx of settlers in the territory brought new infectious diseases to the Indian Tribes, including a severe epidemic of measles in 1847. The Native Americans' lack of immunity to Eurasian diseases resulted in high death rates, with children dying in large numbers. The Whitmans cared for both Cayuse and white settlers, but half of the Cayuse died and nearly all the Cayuse children perished. Seeing that more whites had survived, the Cayuse blamed the Whitmans for the devastating deaths among their people.

The Cayuse tradition held medicine men personally responsible for the patient's recovery. Their despair at the deaths, especially of their children, led the Cayuse under Chief Tiloukaikt to kill the Whitmans in their home on November 29, 1847. Warriors destroyed most of the buildings at Waiilatpu and killed twelve other white settlers in the community, kidnapping many children and forcibly marrying them in certain cases. The events became known among white settlers as the Whitman massacre. The Cayuse held another 53 women and children captive for a month before releasing them through negotiations. These events, and continued white encroachment, triggered a continuing conflict between the settlers and the Cayuse that became known as the Cayuse War. Five Cayuse were hanged for murder.

Historians have noted contemporary accounts of competition between the Protestant missionaries and Catholic priests, who had become established with Jesuit missions from Canada and St. Louis, Missouri, as contributing to the tensions. The Roman Catholic priest John Baptiste Brouillet aided the survivors and helped bury the victims. Two days later Brouillet encountered Rev. Henry H. Spalding on his way to the Whitmans', told him what had happened, and warned him that he might be in danger. Spalding later wrote a pamphlet stating forcefully that the Catholic priests, including Father Brouillet, had incited the Cayuse to massacre.

Spalding's version of the disaster was printed and reprinted, sometimes at taxpayer expense, for the next half-century.

== Legacy and honors ==
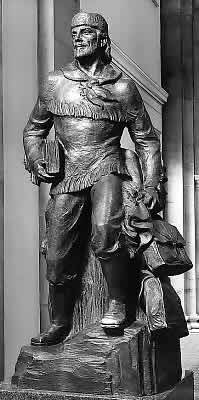
Marcus Whitman, National Statuary Hall Collection, U.S Capitol

Whitman is commemorated by Whitman College in Walla Walla, Washington, the Wallowa–Whitman National Forest, Mount Rainier's Whitman Glacier, and numerous schools, including Marcus Whitman Middle School in Port Orchard, Washington; Marcus Whitman Junior High School in Seattle, Washington; and Marcus Whitman Central School in Rushville, New York, his hometown. His mission is preserved as Whitman Mission National Historic Site. While the name is not used much now, the road from Penn Yan, New York to Rushville, New York was formerly called the Marcus Whitman Highway. Fort Whitman (active 1900–1947) located near LaConner, Washington was named for him.

The Washington State Legislature has declared the fourth day of September as Marcus Whitman Day. A bronze tablet in Wheeler, New York commemorates his 1828–1835 practice as a medical doctor in that town. In 1977, he was inducted into Steuben County, New York's Hall of Fame. Walla Walla has a Marcus Whitman Hotel and Conference Center.

In 1953, the state of Washington donated a statue of him by the sculptor Avard Fairbanks to the National Statuary Hall Collection in the United States Capitol. An identical one stands at the edge of the campus of Whitman College.

=== Historical importance ===
Marcus Whitman's alleged political influence over the United States' claim to the Oregon country, as well as his purported leadership role in the emigration, were greatly exaggerated in the decades following his death, leading to great controversy in popular and academic literature.

After Whitman's death, Spalding energetically promoted the idea that Marcus Whitman had traveled east to Washington in order to "save" the Oregon Territory from British control by convincing the United States to send settlers to contest claims of British governance. In 1901, Yale University historian Edward Gaylord Bourne convincingly disproved this revision of history, using the historical record to demonstrate that Whitman's trip back east was motivated by his desire to maintain the mission to convert the Native American tribes of the Northwest to Christianity and that he returned with settlers who were Protestant in order to promote (Protestant) Christianity.

== See also ==
- Jason Lee (missionary)
