= Whitman Mission National Historic Site =

National Historic Site of the United States

- U.S. National Register of Historic Places
- U.S. National Historic Site
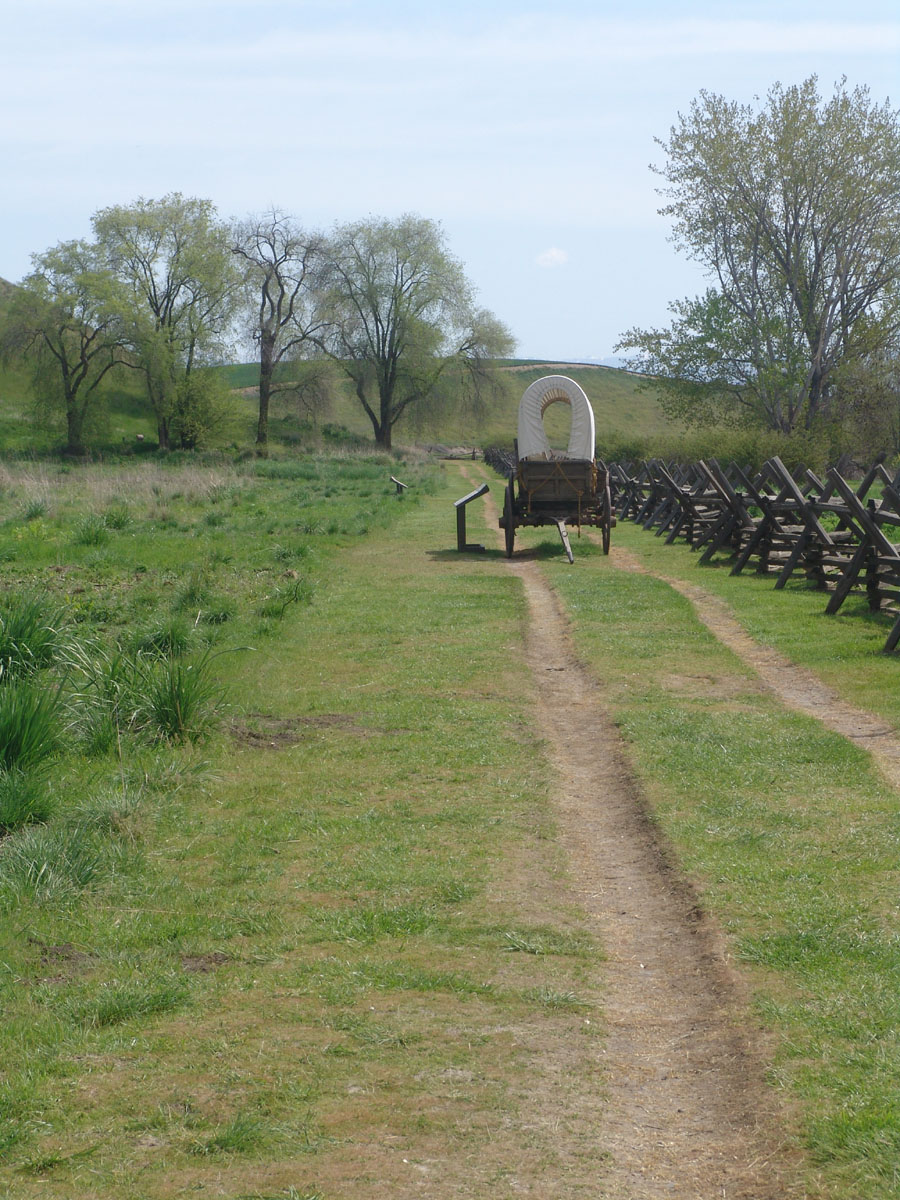
- The Oregon Trail at Whitman Mission

- Location within Washington (state) Location within the United States
- Location: Walla Walla County, Washington, United States
- Nearest city: Walla Walla, Washington
- Coordinates: 46°2′24″N 118°27′41″W
- Area: 138.53 acres (0.5606 km^{2})
- Built: 1837
- Visitation: 54,089 (2025)
- Website: Whitman Mission National Historic Site
- NRHP reference No.: 66000749
- Added to NRHP: October 15, 1966

Whitman Mission National Historic Site is a United States National Historic Site located just west of Walla Walla, Washington, at the site of the former Whitman Mission at Waiilatpu. On November 29, 1847, Dr. Marcus Whitman, his wife Narcissa Whitman, and 11 others were slain by Native Americans of the Cayuse. The site commemorates the Whitmans, their role in establishing the Oregon Trail, and the challenges encountered when two cultures meet.

== History ==
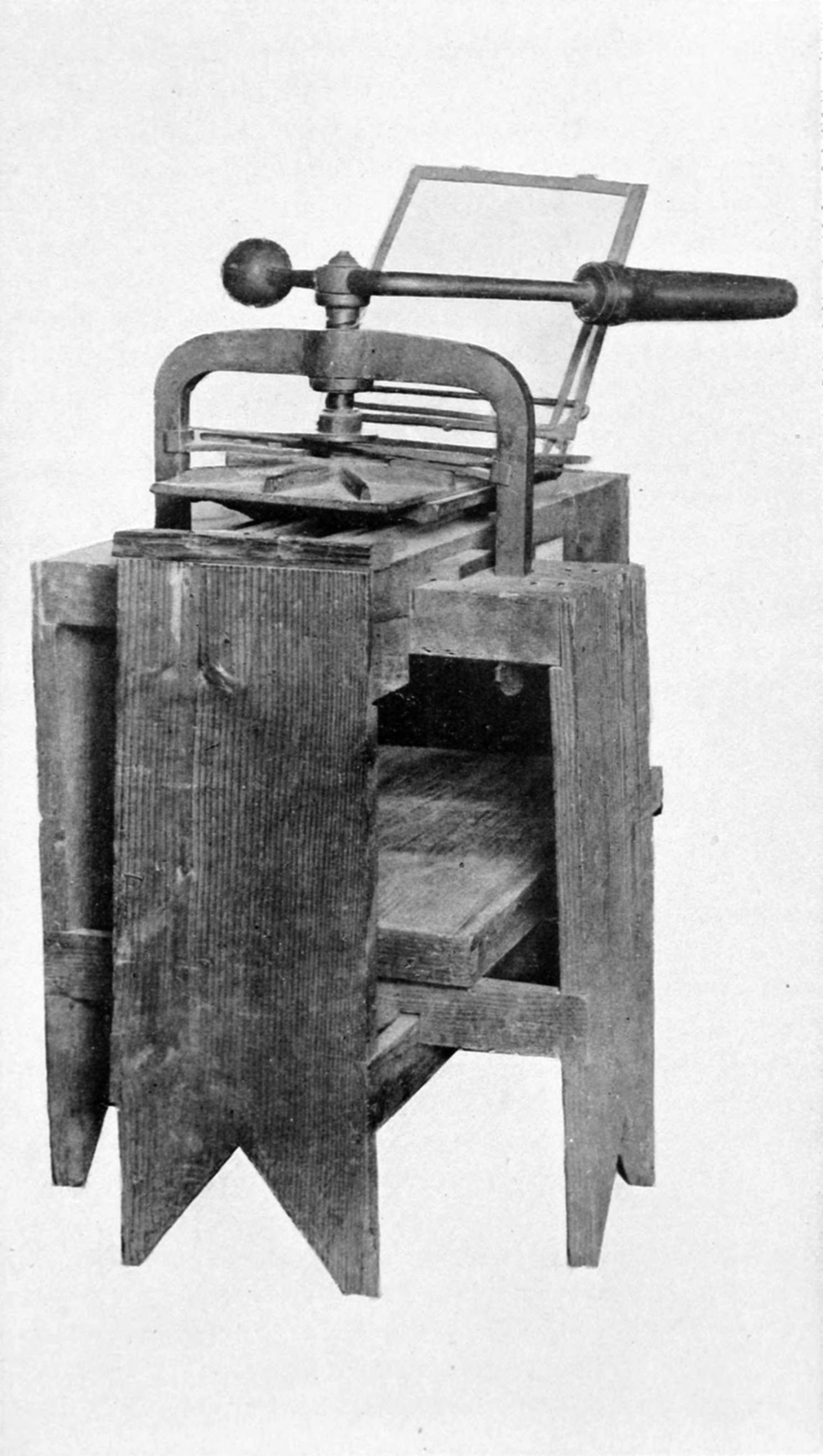
The first printing press in the Pacific Northwest was first used at the Whitman mission, initially to print religious texts and legal documents.

In 1836, a small group of Presbyterian missionaries traveled with the annual fur trapper's caravan into Oregon Country. Among the group, Narcissa Whitman and Eliza Hart Spalding became the first white women to travel across the continent.

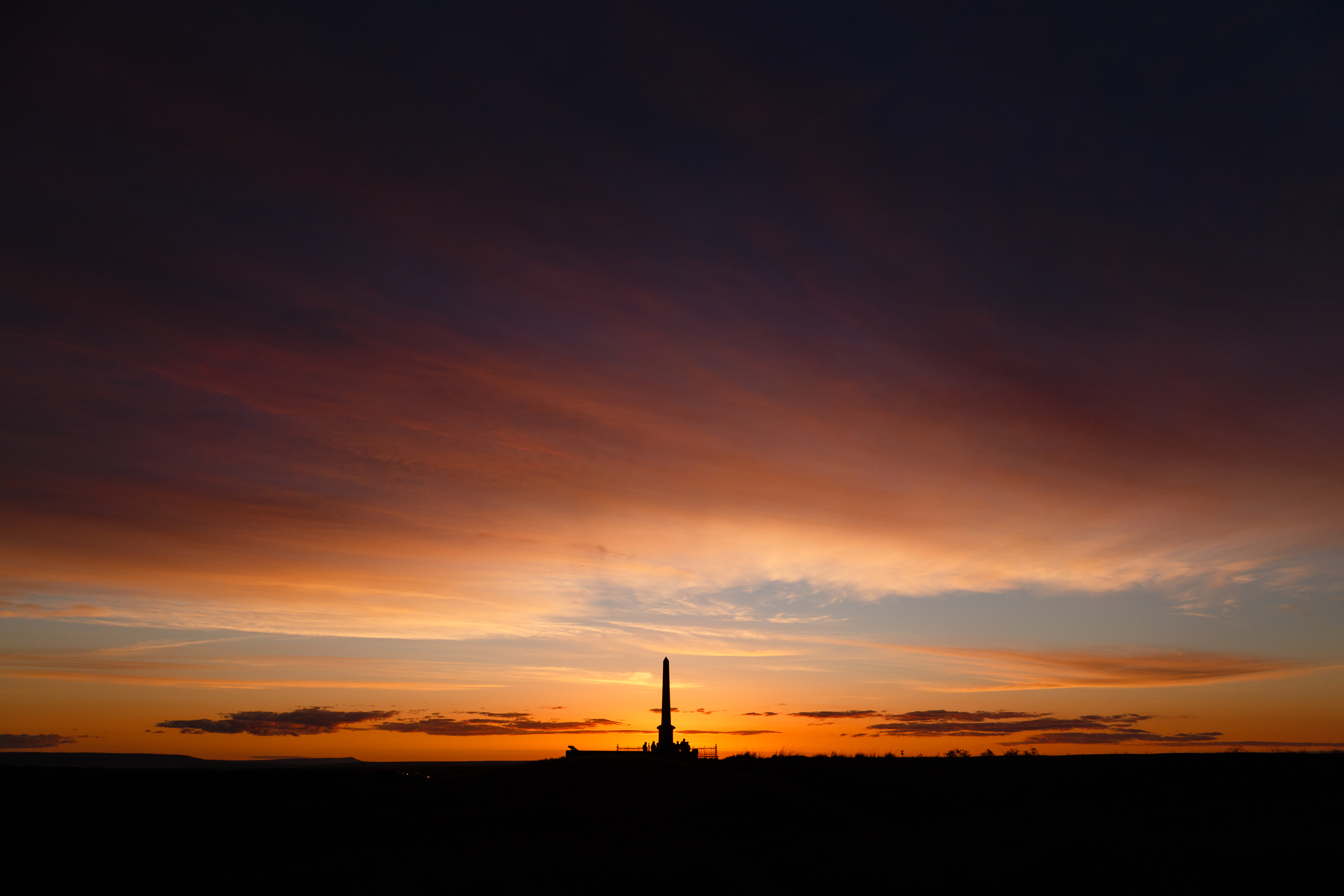
The park's western facing memorial hill is a popular place for visitors to watch the sunset

Marcus Whitman and Narcissa Whitman established the Whitman Mission at Waiilatpu, near the Walla Walla River. The mission was in Cayuse territory. The Cayuse welcomed the Whitmans to their land in 1836 after learning of them the previous year from Samuel Parker.

The Mission became an important stop along the Oregon Trail from 1843 to 1847, and passing immigrants added to the tension. With the influx of white settlers the Cayuse became suspicious of the Whitmans again, fearing that the white man was coming to take the land.

A measles outbreak in November 1847 killed half the local Cayuse. The measles also broke out in the Mission but more white settlers survived. Some of the Cayuse blamed the devastation of their tribe on Dr. Whitman and Mrs. Whitman. They were killed along with eleven others; forty-seven other mission residents were taken hostage. The deaths of the Whitmans shocked the country, prompting Congress to make Oregon a US territory, and precipitated the Cayuse War. Five Cayuse were hanged for murder; see Cayuse Five.

In more recent times, the site has been excavated for important artifacts, and then reburied. A memorial obelisk, erected fifty years after the event, stands on a nearby hill.

The historic site was established in 1936 as Whitman National Monument and was redesignated a National Historic Site on January 1, 1963.
