= Thomas Hill =

Thomas, Tom or Tommy Hill may refer to:

== People ==
=== Politics ===
- Thomas Hill (Worcester MP) (by 1500 – 1557), English member of parliament (MP) for Worcester and Heytesbury
- Thomas Hill (Leominster MP) (1721–1776), British MP for Leominster
- Thomas Hill (mayor) (1825–1891), English mayor of Bradford
- Thomas Hill (politician, born 1846) (1846–1937), member of the Wisconsin State Assembly
- Thomas Hill (Shrewsbury MP) (fl. 1749–1768), British MP for Shrewsbury
- Thomas A. Hill (1889–1937), American politician in the Arkansas House of Representatives
- Thomas E. Hill (politician) (fl. 1967–70), American politician (Ohio)
- Thomas Rowley Hill (1816–1896), British MP for Worcester, 1874–1885
- Thomas W. Hill (1817–1879), American politician (Wisconsin)

=== Arts ===
- Thomas E. Hill (author) (1832–1915), American author of self-help books
- Thomas Hill (gardening author) (c. 1528 – after 1577), English astrologer, author and translator
- Thomas Hill (sculptor) (died 1713,) English sculptor and mason of the dome of St Paul's Cathedral
- Thomas Noel Hill, 2nd Baron Berwick (1770–1832), British peer and art patron
- Thomas Hill (British painter) (1661–1734)
- Thomas Hill (American painter) (1829–1908)
- Thomas Hill (actor) (1927–2009), American actor
- Tom Hill (born 1950), British bass guitarist in glam rock band Geordie
- Thomas Hill (clarinetist) (active from 1983), principal clarinetist with the Boston Philharmonic and member of the Boston Chamber Music
- T. H. E. Hill (Thomas Heinrich Edward Hill, born 1948), pseudonymous American novelist

=== Education, philosophy or religion ===
- Thomas Hill (theologian) (died 1653), English academic, master of Emmanuel College, Cambridge and of Trinity College, Cambridge
- Thomas Wright Hill (1763–1851), British mathematician and schoolmaster, father of Rowland Hill, the originator of the modern postal system
- Thomas Hill (archdeacon) (died 1875), British Anglican clergyman
- Thomas Hill (Unitarian) (1818–1891), American Unitarian, president of Antioch College and Harvard University, inventor
- Thomas E. Hill (academic) (born 1937), American philosopher and academic
- Thomas Hill (dean of Ossory) (1634–1671)

=== Sports ===
- Tom Hill (footballer) (1871–?), English footballer
- Thomas Hill (footballer, born 1901), English footballer for Bolton United, Bradford City, and Walsall
- Thomas Hill (footballer, born 2002), Welsh footballer for Harrogate Town
- Thomas Seymour Hill (1893–1977), Australian rules football administrator
- Thomas Hill (hurdler) (born 1949), American track and field athlete
- Thomas Hill (basketball) (born 1971), American basketball player
- Tom Hill (judoka) (born 1974), Australian judoka
- Tommy Hill (born 1985), British motorcycle road racer

=== Other people ===
- Thomas Hill (businessman) (1825–1891), Scottish railway magnate
- Thomas Noel Hill (1784–1832), British Army officer of the Napoleonic Wars
- Thomas Hill of Dennis (died 1824), Welsh ironmaster
- Thomas Hill (book collector) (1760–1840), English book collector
- Thomas Hill (clothing manufacturer) (died 1909), Nottinghamshire factory owner
- Tom Hill (scout), Lenape mountain man active in the American frontier
- Thomas Ford Hill, English antiquarian
- J. Thomas Hill (born c. 1959), American businessman
- Thomas Heslop Hill (1850–1915), British planter

== Characters ==
- Tommy Hill (Twin Peaks), fictional character in the U.S. television series Twin Peaks

== Other uses ==
- Thomas Hill, Missouri, a community in the United States
- Thomas Hill (manufacturer), company in England which made and repaired road vehicles and railway locomotives

== See also ==
- Tommi Hill (born 2002), American football player
- Tommie Hill (born 1985), American football player
- Hill (surname)
