= Tawatoy =

Cayuse headman

Tawatoy or Young Chief, variously spelled as Tauitowe, Tauatui, Tauitau, Tawatoe or Tu Ah Tway, was a Cayuse headman. Alongside his brother Five Crows, Tawatoy held sway over one of three bands of the Cayuse nation.

As the Catholic missionaries François Norbert Blanchet and Modeste Demers entered the Columbian Plateau late in 1838, Tawatoy became interested in their preaching. This earned the enmity of Marcus Whitman, who operated the Waiilaptu Mission in the area. When Demers returned to Fort Nez Percés the following summer, Tawatoy let one of his sons become baptised and Pierre-Chrysologue Pambrun was appointed his godfather. Pambrun later established a house near the Umatilla River for Tawatoy, although he allowed its use by the Catholic priests. Despite his developing ties to Catholicism, Whitman reported to his superiors in 1839 that "...he is not governed entirely" by the Catholic missionaries.

Tawatoy would join the first Walla Walla expedition destined for New Helvetia. While there, he witnessed the death of Toayahnu, the son of Walla Walla chieftain Yellow Serpent.

Tawatoy died likely in modern Montana during 1853. After Tawatoy's death, his nephew Weatenatemany, also known as Young Chief, ascended into prominence among the Cayuse.
