= Battle of Walla Walla =

1855 battle in the Yakima War

- Part of Yakima War
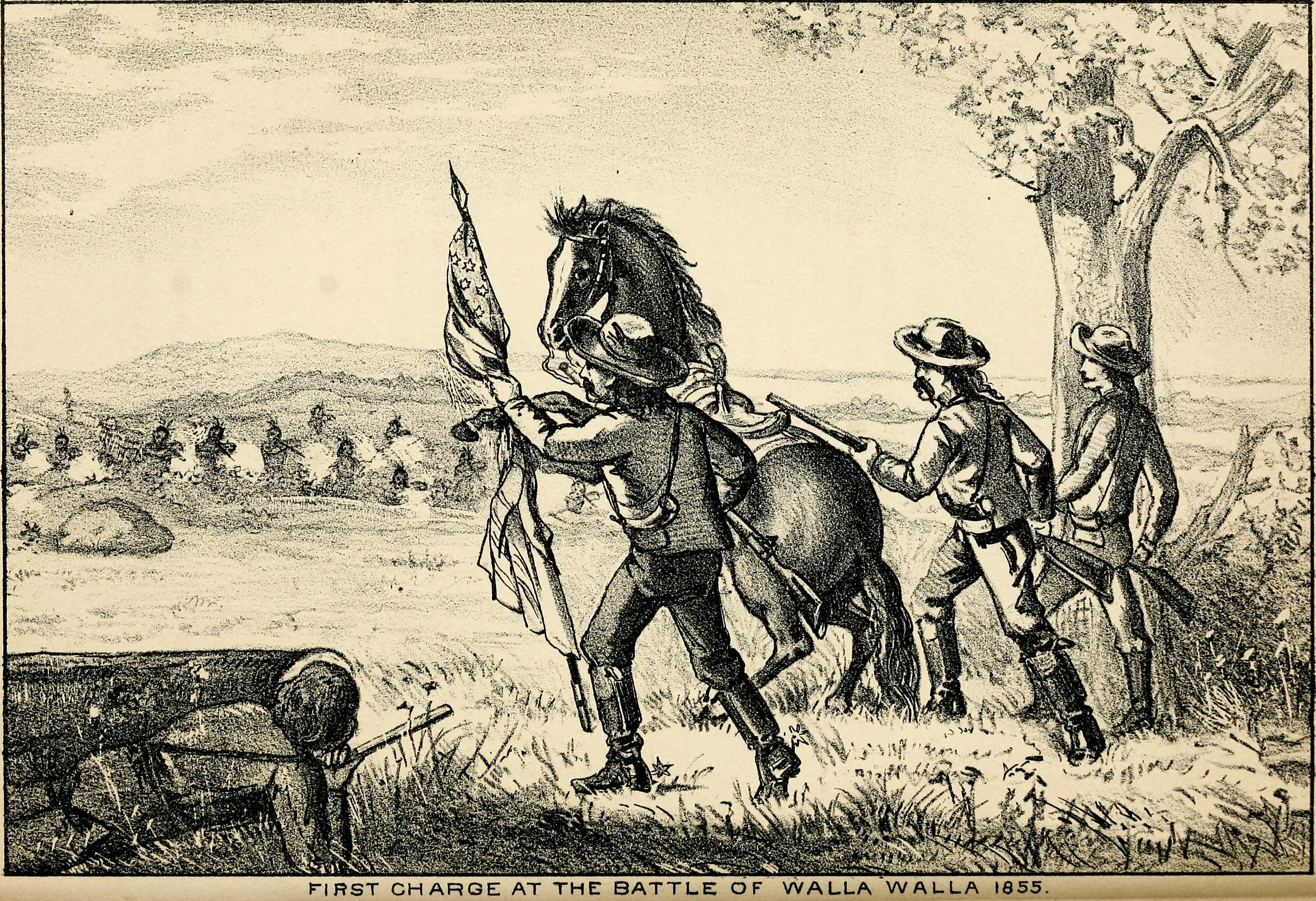
- Depiction "First Charge at the Battle of Walla Walla 1855"
Date	December 7–11, 1855
Location	Walla Walla Valley, Washington
Result	United States Victory

Belligerents
United States	Walla Walla

Commanders and leaders
James K. Kelly; Lt. J.M. Burrows	Peo-Peo-Mox-Mox †

Units involved
Oregon Mounted Volunteers: Company A; Company B; Company F; Company H; Company I; Company K	

Strength
476 Volunteers	600–800 fighters

Casualties and losses
6 killed 17 wounded	75–100 killed (est.); Unknown wounded 4 hostages killed

The Battle of Walla Walla was the longest battle fought during the Yakima War. The battle began on December 7, 1855, and ended on December 11, 1855. The battle was fought between six companies of the Oregon Mounted Volunteers and the Walla Walla. Fighting alongside the Walla Walla were members of several different tribes, such as the Cayuse, Palouse and Yakama.

== Background ==
Following a Walla Walla raid on the Fort Walla Walla trading post and reports that Chief Peopeomoxmox had vowed to kill Washington Territory Governor Isaac Stevens, troops from the Oregon Mounted Volunteers were dispatched to the Umatilla River and later to the Touchet River.

The Chief and four others met the troops at the Touchet and, willingly, became their hostages in order to prevent an attack on his village. The volunteers and the five hostages began to march down the Touchet in order to establish a winter camp.

== Battle ==
As the soldiers marched toward the former Whitman Mission, they realized that they were being pursued by a large group of Native warriors. Soon, a running battle began at the mouth of the Touchet. On the first day, four of the five hostages, including the chief, struggled to escape but were killed by volunteers.

On the fourth and final day of the battle, Both the Natives and the Volunteers withdrew, the Volunteers to Fort Henrietta on the Umatilla.

== Aftermath ==
The battle resulted in the death of Walla Walla tribe leader Peo-Peo-Mox-Mox along with the deaths of six volunteers and between 75 and 100 Natives. The total Native casualties are unknown due to bodies being taken from the battlefield, but volunteers did find 39 bodies following the battle.
