= Taman Tugu =

Park in Kuala Lumpur, Malaysia

Coordinates: 3°09′11″N 101°41′04″E

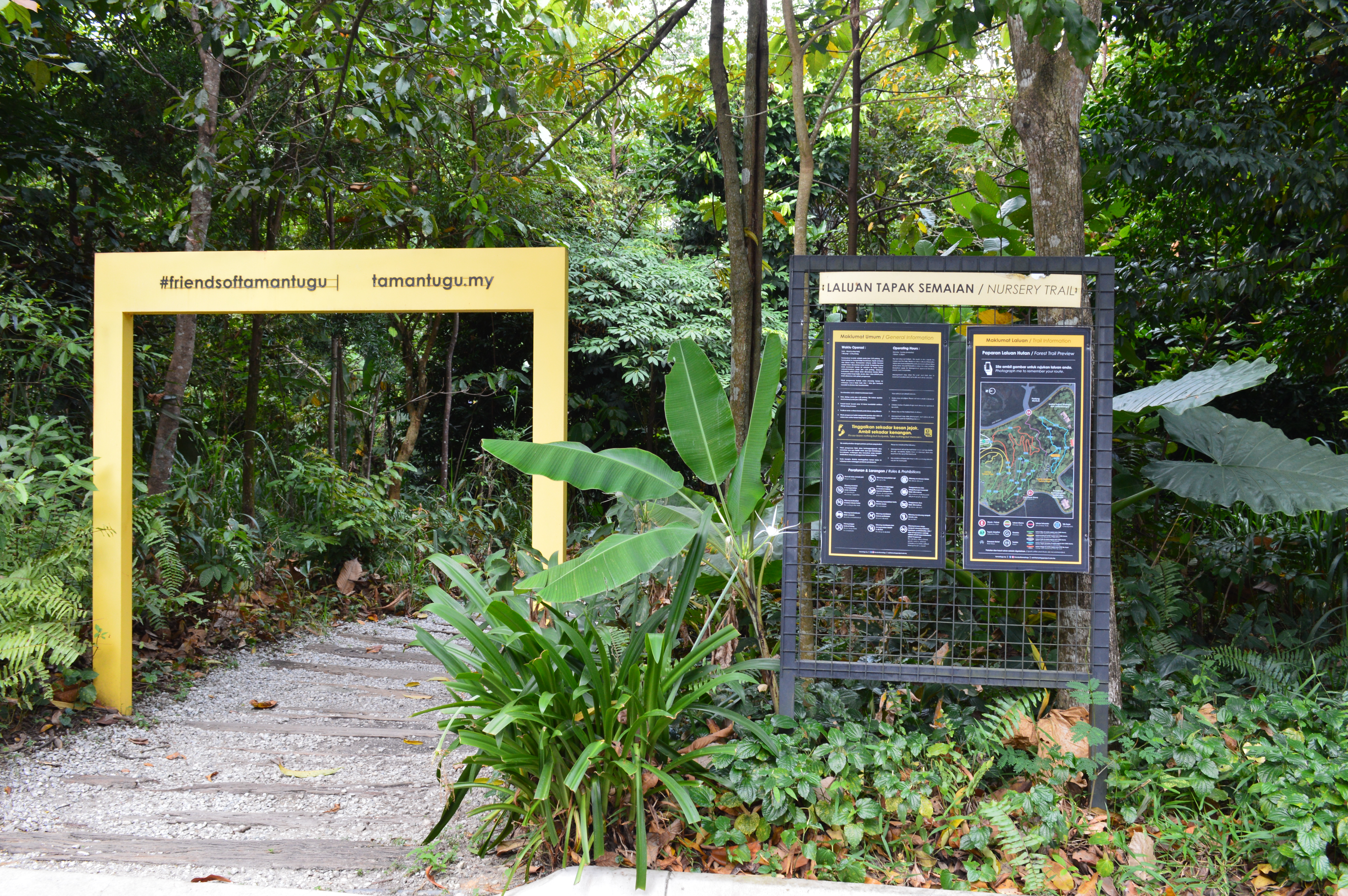
- Nursery Trail in Taman Tugu
- Interactive map of Taman Tugu

Taman Tugu is a green public park and conservation site with over 5 kilometres of trails in the heart of Kuala Lumpur, spanning over 66 acres (27 ha). The hills where both parks are located separate Malaysia's Parliament building and Perdana Botanical Gardens from the downtown area around Dataran Merdeka. Taman Tugu is the property of Malaysia's sovereign wealth fund, Khazanah Nasional.

It was once the residential area for British colonial officers, and later, Malaysian government officers. Through a partnership with the Forest Research Institute of Malaysia (FRIM), over a thousand trees in Taman Tugu have been marked for preservation. More trees, including indigenous species, are being planted on-site within nurseries to eventually be moved into the main forest area.

== History ==
In the 1930s, the Taman Tugu site, which used to be a plain grass-land, was home to some British government officers. Many of these British residents tried their hand at planting in their backyard. A popular species experimented with was palm oil trees which were brought from West Africa as ornamental plants. After independence, the site was used by Malaysian government officers. Many of the residents left the site towards the late 1970s.
