= Walla Walla expeditions =

Trade expeditions by Sahaptian peoples

- Location: Columbian Plateau to Alta California
- Organized by: Piupiumaksmaks, head chief of the Walla Walla; Slough-Keetcha, leader of the Spokane; Tawatoy, leader of the Cayuse

The Walla Walla expeditions were organized during the mid-nineteenth century to enrich the Sahaptian peoples of the Columbian Plateau with cattle purchased in Alta California. Among the first expedition was Walla Walla leader Piupiumaksmaks, Garry of the Spokanes and Cayuse headman Tawatoy. They arrived at New Helvetia in 1844. A confrontation erupted with the son of Piupiumaksmaks, Toayahnu, being killed by an American. A second expedition was organized, returning to New Helvetia in 1846, where two thousand cattle was purchased. When the expedition returned to the Columbian Plateau, members were ill with measles. The disease was consequently spread across the Pacific Northwest and was a major cause of the Whitman massacre.

== Background ==
The Sahaptian nations acquired horses through Northern Shoshone in the eighteenth century, radically changing their subsistence gathering patterns. Groups of Niimíipu, Cayuse and Walla Walla peoples began to hunt Plains bison across the Rocky Mountains throughout winters. Plateau natives had progressively explored regions lying to the south prior the expeditions. In 1841 Charles Wilkes stated that Piupiumaksmaks and Tawatoy were "going to the Shasta country to trade for blankets, powder and ball, together with trinkets and beads, in exchange for their horses and beaver-skins." Members of the Walla Walla nation later claimed that Piupiumaksmaks was horse raiding in modern California from an early age.

As the Columbian Plateau became included in the expanding North American fur trade, additional materials and goods additionally altered their means of living. Regional trade was focused on Fort Nez Percés, a Hudson's Bay Company (HBC) post. These transactions didn't include livestock as the HBC station maintained a policy of keeping its supply of animals. Settlers from the United States of America began to emigrate to the Willamette Valley in the 1830s and traveled through the plateau. Small numbers of ox and cattle were purchased from them, adding to the large horse herds already established. Marcus Whitman reported to his superiors being lent two oxen from a Cayuse noble to establish Waiilaptu in 1836.

== First expedition ==
Piupiumaksmaks' son, Toayahnu, formed the basis of the first expedition from his time among Euro-Americans. He was sent to reside at the Methodist Mission in 1836 under the supervision of Jason Lee. Christened after Elijah Hedding, Toayahnu spent several years among the whites in the Willamette Valley. He witnessed the success of the Willamette Cattle Company, a venture to procure cattle for the settlers from Alta California. Several hundred head were brought back overland and distributed among its subscribers, ensuring their rising material progress.

After he returned to Walla Walla country, Toayahnu relayed this information to his father and other Indigenous leadership of the region. Efforts to organise a trading outfit to gain cattle in numbers solidified in 1844. The outfit contained a sizable number of members to ensure safety against potentially aggressive indigenous nations located between the Plateau and New Helvetia. The total number of men numbered from an estimated 36 to 50, in addition to numerous women and children. Prominent members included Yellow Bird, Toayahnu, Young Chief, Spokane Garry along with other Nez Perce and Spokane headmen. These men dressed in "English costume", in the style of HBC officers.

Accounts vary but there appears to have been minimal conflict throughout the indigenous nations the expedition passed through. John Sutter welcomed the expedition to his colony, having become acquainted with Yellow Bird while he stayed at Fort Vancouver. Commercial transactions began in earnest with settlers of the area. Stockpiles of Elk, Beaver and Deer furs were sold by the Salishan and Sahaptins for heads of cattle.

More livestock was desired however and members of the expedition left New Helvetia for the surrounding area. While hunting for additional deer and elk, a group of "mountain freebooters" were encountered and a skirmish ensued. No one of the expedition was grievously harmed and a number of horses and mules were gained from the fleeing men.

A clash of cultures occurred when the group returned to New Helvetia as the beasts of burden were formerly property of settlers there. Mexican and American colonists demanded their return, offering initially ten and then fifteen cattle as recompense. Yellow Bird and others did not find the offer valid as it was custom among Plateau natives for horses taken from enemies to become the property of new holders.

=== Death of Toayahnu ===
A particular mule was identified by an American, Grove Cook, as once belonging to him. He immediately demanded its restitution and a confrontation ensued. Toayahnu came to the American and said "go now and take your mule" while holding a loaded rifle. Cook relented, despite Toayahnu insisting he was aiming at an eagle near by. Two days later along with Spokane Garry and Young Chief, Toayahnu entered a dwelling at New Helvetia. Several other Americans inside the building began to insult the group, with Cook stating "yesterday you was going to kill me, now you must die" to Toayahnu. After praying for a short while, the Walla Walla noble was murdered. Spokane Garry narrowly avoided being shot, and the expedition was able to break out of New Helvetia without any additional losses. The cattle purchased were left at the colony, making the first trip a failure.

=== Unrest in the Columbia Plateau ===
When the expedition returned to the Plateau, their grievances were sent to the HBC by the Nez Perce Ellis. He met with John McLoughlin and James Douglas, with both men offering their condolences and sympathy. The company men did not offer any material support however.

Next Ellis visited Elijah White, then the U.S. Indian Sub-agent. White had previously made the Cayuse and Nez Perce adopt laws that outlawed natives from killing whites and vice versa. Based on these laws Ellis demanded that Cook be brought to White to be punished. As New Helvetia was located within Mexican Alta California, White held no authority there and was unable to compel any resolution to the conflict. Ellis told White that there were three groups divided on how the Plateau natives should act. One faction felt it best to punish the Willamette Valley settlers as they were Americans, like Toayahnu's killers. Another faction preferred to establish what the reactions of the HBC and Willamette Valley settlers to action against the California colonists. A final block preferred military action against the California settlements as White recounted:

He assured me that the Cayuse, Walla Wallas, Pend d'Oreilles, Flatheads, Nez Perces and Snakes, were all in terms of amity, and all that portion of the aggrieved party were for raising about two thousand warriors of these formidable tribes and march to California at once, and nobly revenge themselves on the inhabitants and then by plunder enrich themselves on the spoils.

== Second expedition ==
Preparations for a small group of Cayuse and Walla Wallas to return to Alta California were eventually formed. Joel Palmer gave Piupiumaksmaks several gifts of tobacco and small goods in March 1846. The conversation eventually went to Toayahnu's murder as Palmer recalled that "he expressed his determination to go to California this season." The Lenape scout Tom Hill joined the Southern bound group.

When the expedition entered Alta California in 1846, the region had entered a tumultuous period. The Mexican–American War was underway and forces loyal to the Americans had been marshaled to begin the Conquest of California. Close to 300 California Natives and 150 white settlers were assembled at New Helvetia under the authority of Joseph Warren Revere in anticipation of the Walla Walla and Cayuse band. Instead of arriving to fight however, Piupiumaksmaks wished to establish cordial relations. While Revere later lamented not being able to be "leading a most terrific charge into the midst of his warriors", the American officer agreed to listen to the Walla Walla noble. His speech was recorded by Revere as the following:

I have come from the forests of Oregon with no hostile intentions. You can see that I speak the truth, because I have brought with me only forty warriors, with their women and little children, and because I am here with few followers, and without arms. We have come to hunt the beasts of the field, and also to trade our horses for cattle; for my people require cattle, which are not so abundant in Oregon as in California. I have come, too, according to the custom of our tribes, to visit the grave of my poor son, Elijah, who was murdered by a white man. But I have not traveled thus far only to mourn. I demand justice! The blood of my slaughtered son calls for vengeance! I have told what brought me here; and when these objects are accomplished, I shall be satisfied, and shall return peaceably to my own country. When I came to California, I did not know that the Boston men [Americans] had taken the country from the Spaniards [Mexicans]. I am glad to hear it; for I have always been friendly to the Boston men, and have been kind to those who have passed through my territories. It must be plain to you that we did not set out on a hostile expedition against your countrymen.

Relations between the settlement and the visiting Plateau natives were then repaired. John C. Frémont arrived in the area shortly after the expedition encamped near New Helvetia. Ten Walla Walla men were recruited into the California Battalion as scouts. They would fight with distinction at the Battle of Natividad against the forces of José Castro. The remainder of the expedition remained in the Sacramento Valley. Records kept by Sutter's officers note interactions with Piupiumaksmaks until July 1847. He was given compensation for previous grievances, the primary being his son's death. The expedition then returned north to the Columbia Plateau, with the Walla Wallas bring back herds numbering close to two thousand of cattle.

=== Measles epidemic ===
A lasting consequence of the second Walla Walla expedition was the dispersion of measles from California into the modern states and provinces of Oregon, Washington, Idaho, Montana, British Columbia and Alaska. The illness was carried from New Helvetia back to the Walla Walla and Cayuse homelands, quickly spreading across the region.

Paul Kane was among the Walla Walla when the expedition returned in July 1847. A son of Piupiumaksmaks arrived several days in advance of the main party and informed his brethren the deaths caused from measles. The speech lasted almost three hours and close to thirty people were counted as dead. After the speech Kane said that the Indigenous "sent messengers in every direction on horseback spread the news of the disaster among all the neighbouring tribes ..." This passage has been used to reconstruct the spread of the illness across the Pacific Northwest.

Along with other causes, the tension caused from measles induced deaths among Cayuse raised simmering tensions with ABCFM missionary Marcus Whitman to a boil. Particular Cayuse held Marcus accountable for the deaths, killing him and several other people in an event known as the Whitman Massacre.

== Bibliography ==
=== Articles ===
- Haines, Francis (1946). "Tom Hill-Delaware Scout". California Historical Society Quarterly. 25 (2). University of California Press: 139–148. doi:10.2307/25155971. ISSN 0008-1175. JSTOR 25155971.
- Heizer, Robert Fleming (1942). "Walla Walla Indian Expeditions to the Sacramento Valley". California Historical Society Quarterly. 21 (1). University of California Press: 1–7. doi:10.2307/25160976. ISSN 0008-1175. JSTOR 25160976.

=== Books ===
- Boyd, Robert T. (1999). The Coming of the Spirit of Pestilence: Introduced Infectious Diseases and Population Decline among Northwest Coast Indians, 1774-1874. Seattle, WA: University of Washington Press. ISBN 9780295978376.
- Jessett, Thomas E. (1960). Chief Spokan Garry, 1811-1892, Christian, statesman, and friend of the white man. Minneapolis, MN: T. S. Denison & Co. – via HathiTrust.
- Palmer, Joel (1906). Thwaites, Reuben Gold (ed.). Palmer's Journal of travels over the Rocky Mountains, 1845-1846. Early Western Travels 1748–1846. Vol. 30. Cleveland, OH: A. H. Clark Company – via Internet Archive.
- Kane, Paul (1859). Wanderings of an artist among the Indians of North America. London: Longman, Brown, Green, Longmans, and Roberts.
- Splawn, A. J. (1917). Ka-mi-akin, the Last Hero of the Yakimas. Kilham Stationery & Printing Company. ISBN 978-1-5485-4168-2.
- Wilkes, Charles (1844). Narrative of the United States Exploring Expedition: During the Years 1838, 1839, 1840, 1841, 1842. Vol. 4. Philadelphia: C. Sherman.
- Revere, Joseph Warren (1849). A tour of duty in California. New York, NY: C. S. Francis – via Internet Archive.

=== Historical letters ===
- Whitman, Marcus (1837-05-05). "To Rev. Greene: May 5, 1837". Whitman Mission National Historic Site. National Park Service. Archived from the original on 2015-09-28.

=== Newspapers ===
- Colton, Walter; Semple, Robert B. (1846-09-19). "The Walla Walla Indians". The Californian. Vol. 1, no. 6. Monterey, CA. p. 1.
