= Alfred Venning =

British colonial officer (1846-1927)

Alfred Venning ISO
- Born: 18 May 1846
- Died: 22 August 1927 (aged 81)
- Occupations: Colonial administrator and botanist
- Known for: Perdana Botanical Gardens

Alfred Venning ISO (18 May 1846 - 22 August 1927) was a British colonial administrator and botanist who served in British Malaya and established Kuala Lumpur's oldest large-scale recreational park, the Perdana Botanical Gardens.

== Early life ==
Alfred Venning, before beginning his career in British Malaya, was a planter in Ceylon where he also acted as magistrate and deputy coroner.

== Career ==
Venning arrived in Malaya in the early 1880s and joined the trading firm of Messrs. T.Hill and O.Rathbone before becoming a civil servant in the British administration in the role of Treasurer of Selangor in 1884. In the same year he became the first Secretary of the newly opened Royal Selangor Club. After a number of years he became the first chairman of the Kuala Lumpur Sanitary Board, and in 1893 was appointed Acting Government Secretary. After becoming Chief Magistrate he was then transferred to the Perak Secretariat before returning to Selangor as Acting Resident. In 1903 he was promoted to Federal Secretary continuing in the role until his retirement in 1907.

He was awarded the Companion of the Imperial Service Order which is given for long and commendable service in the civil service of the British Empire. He died at Bracknell on 22 August 1927 leaving four sons and two daughters.

== Perdana Botanical Gardens ==
Venning is most remembered as the person responsible for the creation of Kuala Lumpur's oldest, large-scale recreational park, the Perdana Botanical Gardens, formerly known as the Lake Gardens.

In 1888 he approached the Resident, Frank Swettenham, with a proposal for the creation of a park in Kuala Lumpur, and after jointly surveying the proposed sight, a large area of swampland in a valley on the outskirts of the town, Swettenham obtained the permission of the High Commissioner and funds were approved.

Venning then set about clearing the land which consisted of 173 acres and planted ornamental trees and shrubs. The Sungei Bras Bras stream which ran through the valley was damned creating an ornamental lake. In May 1889 the Governor of the Straits Settlements, Cecil Clementi Smith formerly opened the gardens and named the lake "Sydney Lake" after the first name of Swettenham's wife. For the next ten years Venning continued to maintain and improve the park which was managed by a committee which he established and presided over as president.

== Memorials ==
On Venning's retirement from the British administration in 1907, a memorial tree with a plaque was planted in the park which stated: "This tree was planted on the occasion of the departure of Mr. A. R. Venning, Federal Secretary, F. M. S. who created the Lake and laid out the gardens and took charge of them from their origin in 1889 till he left in 1907." The road which ran through the park was named Venning Road (today Jalan Perdana) in his memory.
