= Alexander P. Ankeny =

American Businessman

Alexander Postlewaite Ankeny
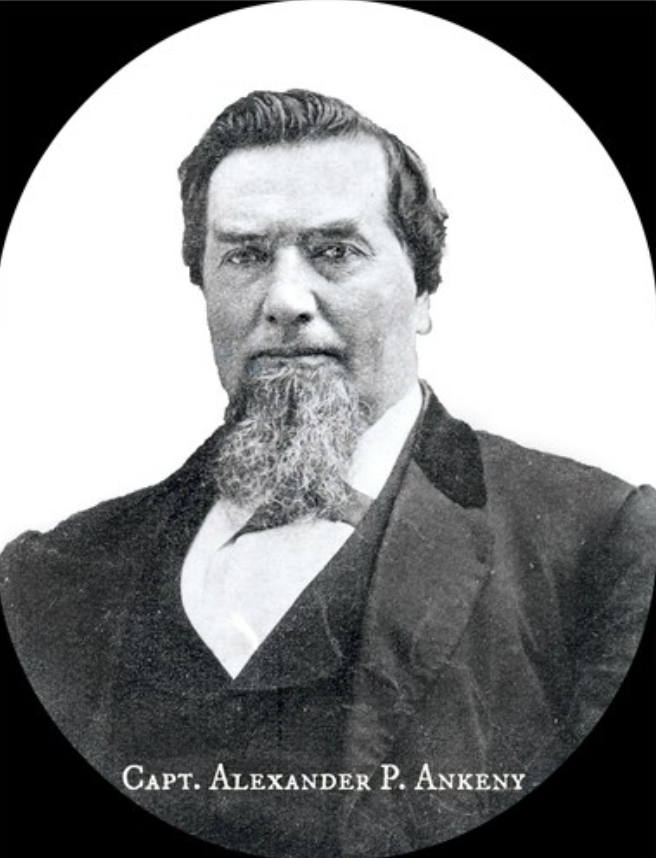
- Born: November 6, 1823; Ligonier, Pennsylvania, US
- Died: March 24, 1891 (aged 68); Salem, Oregon, US
- Occupations: businessman and steamboat owner
- Notable work: Construction of New Market Theater in Portland, Oregon

Alexander Postlewaite Ankeny (November 6, 1823 – March 24, 1891) was an American pioneer businessman, soldier, and steamboat owner in the Pacific Northwest of the United States. He is chiefly remembered for having built the New Market Theater, a historic structure in Portland, Oregon.

== Early life and family ==
Ankeny was born in the Ligonier Valley, Westmoreland County, Pennsylvania, on November 6, 1823. Ankeny adopted Levi P. Ankeny when Levi was a youth. In 1903, Levi Ankeny became a U.S. senator from the state of Washington. He lived in Walla Walla, Washington.

Ankeny had two daughters from his first marriage. One daughter married Vincent ("Vin") Cook. The other daughter married a man named Randall. Randall, who apparently had the rank of Captain, was reported to have been killed in Indian country in July 1877. This person may have been Capt. Darius B. Randall, who was killed in the Nez Perce War on July 5, 1877.

In 1851, Ankeny married Charity Smith. This was the second marriage for both of them. Smith's son by her first marriage, Levi, was adopted by Ankeny. By Charity Smith, Ankeny had another son, Henry E. Ankeny (died December 21, 1906).

In 1854, Ankeny's wife, Charity, died. His third wife was the widow of a Captain Stapleton.

== American West ==
Ankeny came across the plains to California in 1848. In the fall of 1849, Ankeny returned east by way of the Isthmus of Panama. In 1850, Ankeny returned to the west and came to Oregon in 1850. Ankeny came to Oregon in the company of some boat builders. After Ankeny arrived in Oregon, he received a contract to build a wharf boat on the Willamette River at the foot of what later became known as Washington Street in Portland.

In the spring of 1851, Ankeny and his family relocated to the town of Lafayette, in Yamhill County. They lived there until about the end of the Indian war in 1855. Also in the spring of 1851, Ankeny started a store in Lane County, where the city of Eugene later was established, and placed one of the men who had come with him from California in charge of the store.

== Military service ==
On January 27, 1856, Ankeny was mustered into the first regiment of the Oregon Mounted Volunteers as the captain of Company C for the purpose of engaging in the Yakima War. Col. Thomas R. Cornelius commanded the regiment. The regiment was mustered into service of the Territory of Oregon on January 16, 1856.

== Steamer operations ==
Ankeny was reported to have operated two freight steamboats between Portland and The Dalles, Oregon. In 1861–62, Ankeny, Dr. Dorsey S. Baker, Henry W. Corbett, Capt. E.W. Baughman, and William (I.W.) Gates built the steamer Spray to run above The Dalles on the Columbia and Snake rivers. Spray ran for about a year until it was sold to the Oregon Steam Navigation Company (O.S.N.), which was forming a monopoly on steamer traffic on the Columbia.

Ankeny was also involved in steamboat traffic on the Willamette River. In about 1867, Ankeny acquired the steamer Echo, which ran between Portland and points on the Willamette. In 1867, Ankeny and William Kohl brought the steamer Cascade from Puget Sound to the Columbia River.

In 1869, Ankeny organized a steamboat concern to compete with O.S.N. According to one source, only two vessels were operated by this concern, an older ferry named Independence and a small steamer named Wasco.

According to another source, Ankeny purchased Independence in 1860, and ran it as a regular steamboat, rather than as a ferry, on the Portland-Cascades route and then sold it to O.S.N. Ankeny is also reported to have run Independence on the route from Portland to the Cowlitz River in the Washington Territory.

== Other businesses ==
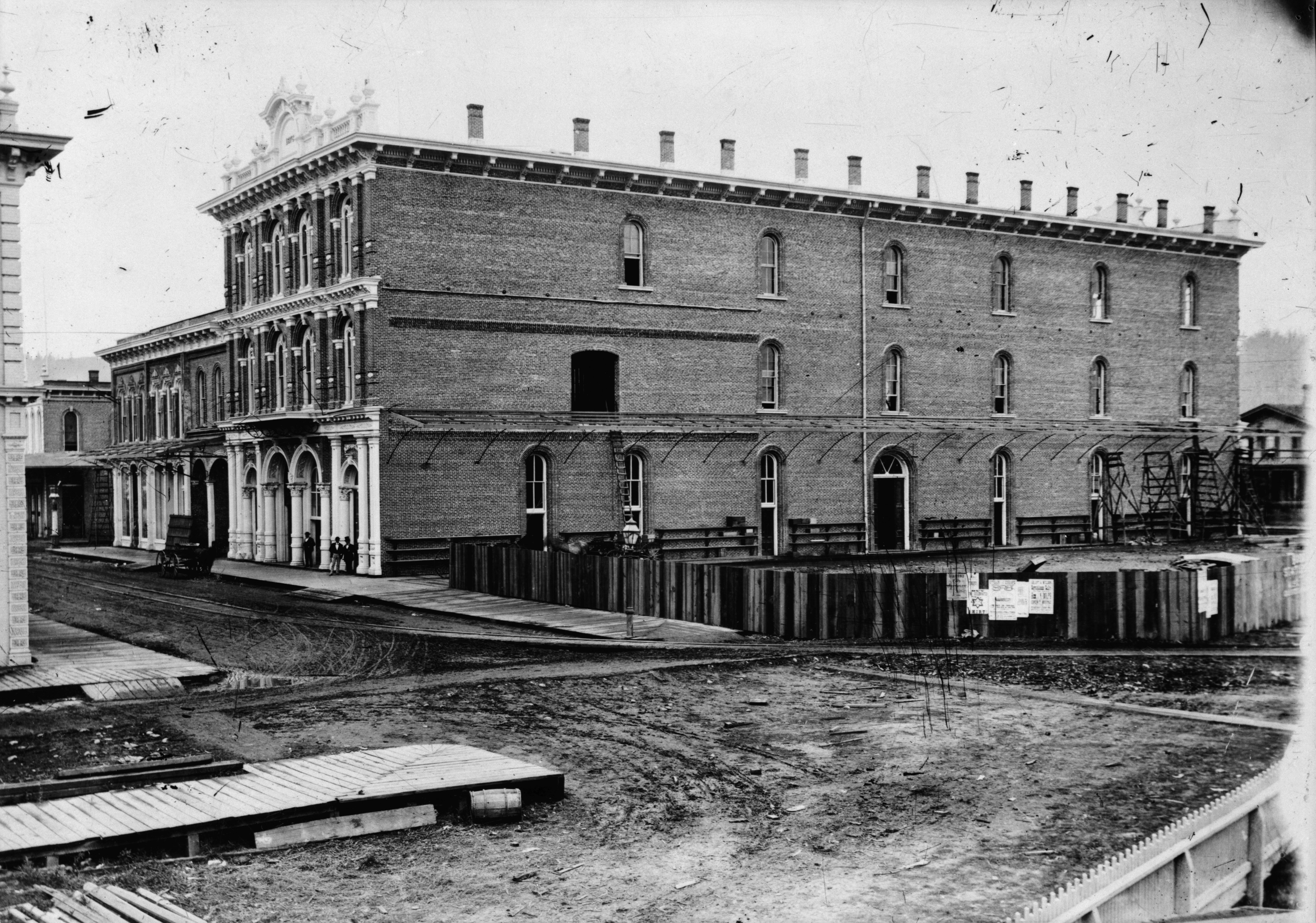
New Market Theater circa 1875

In 1865, Ankeny was one of the five directors of a bank in Salem, Oregon. In 1872 to 1873, Ankeny built the New Market Theater in Portland, the first brick theater built in the city, at Front Street, between present-day Ash and Ankeny streets. In 1915, the theater was reported to have cost about $100,000. Ankeny intended the first floor to be shops and the upper two floors to be the theater.

In early March 1877, Ankeny and two other men were reported to have recently filed articles of incorporation in the Multnomah County, Oregon clerk's office for the "Blue Gravel Hydraulic Gold Placer Mining Company." The company was formed to work mines which Ankeny had recently acquired in Josephine County, Oregon. The principal office and place of business would be in Portland. The amount of capital stock was $150,000, with each share valued at $1.

In August 1878, Ankeny was reported to have sold the New Market Theater to Mayor D.P. Thompson and M.S. Burrell of the firm of Knapp, Burrell & Co. for the price of $220,000. This was reported to have been the largest real estate sale by an individual in the history of Portland up to then.

Ankeny Street in Portland is named after Ankeny. This happened in 1891, when, after the merger of Portland and East Portland, the streets were renamed. Up to then, Ankeny Street was known simply as A Street.

== Last years ==
In about September 1889, Ankeny had a fit of apoplexy and was taken to the Portland asylum.
