= Oregon Mounted Volunteers =

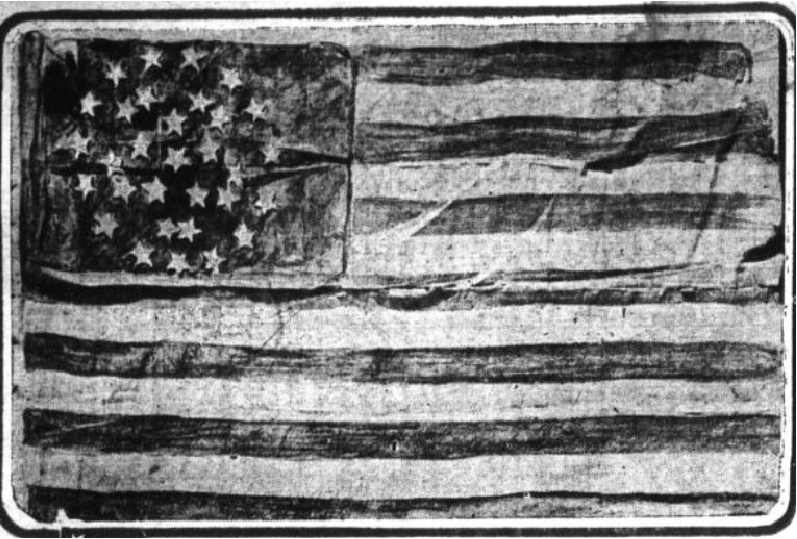
- Flag of Company A
- Active: 17 October 1855 – July 1856
- Country: United States
- Allegiance: Union
- Branch: Infantry

The Oregon Mounted Volunteers was a military regiment recruited in the U.S. state of Oregon during the Yakima War. In November 1855, Major Mark Chinn left The Dalles and assembled 6 companies of Mounted Volunteers to turn against the Walla Walla people. Major Chinn and the Mounted Volunteers set base in Fort Henrietta where they built a stockade. Control of the Mounted Volunteers was given to Lieutenant Colonel James Kelly.

== Listings ==
Gabriel J. Rains, who had just 350 federal troops under his immediate command, urgently appealed to Acting Governor Charles Mason for military aid, writing that

... all the disposable force in the district will at once take the field, and I have the honor to make a requisition upon you for two companies of volunteers to take the field the earliest possible moment. The composition of these companies to be as follows: One Captain, one First Lieutenant and one Second Lieutenant, two musicians, four Sergeants, four Corporals and seventy four privates. The greatest exertions should be made to raise and equip these companies at once.

The first company of the regiment was mustered under the command of Colonel James W. Nesmith in October 1855 and included Company "F", "H", and "A". In December 1855 a regiment was mustered under the command of Colonel James E. Kelly and included Company "E" and Company "G". Company "C" was later recruited and commanded by Colonel Thomas R. Cornelius in January 1856. Alexander P. Ankeny served as captain of Company "C".

== Gear ==
The Oregon Mountain Volunteers were expected to furnish their own horse, arms, and equipment, if possible. There has been no official data describing the uniform that the command wore: clothes of everyday usage or if they were supplied with old US Army regular uniforms. One volunteer identified as 55ER wrote that

... For the horse that I furnished and rode though, that service I was offered $225.00 in gold coin. I would not take it. He was appraised into the service at $225.00 by men appointed by the governor and sworn to do their duty. No government forage was furnished our horses. No sufficient amount of provisions was furnished us. No bedding was furnished us except what we paid for ourselves.

Companies A and D carried their own flags. With them being made by the local women of their Community.

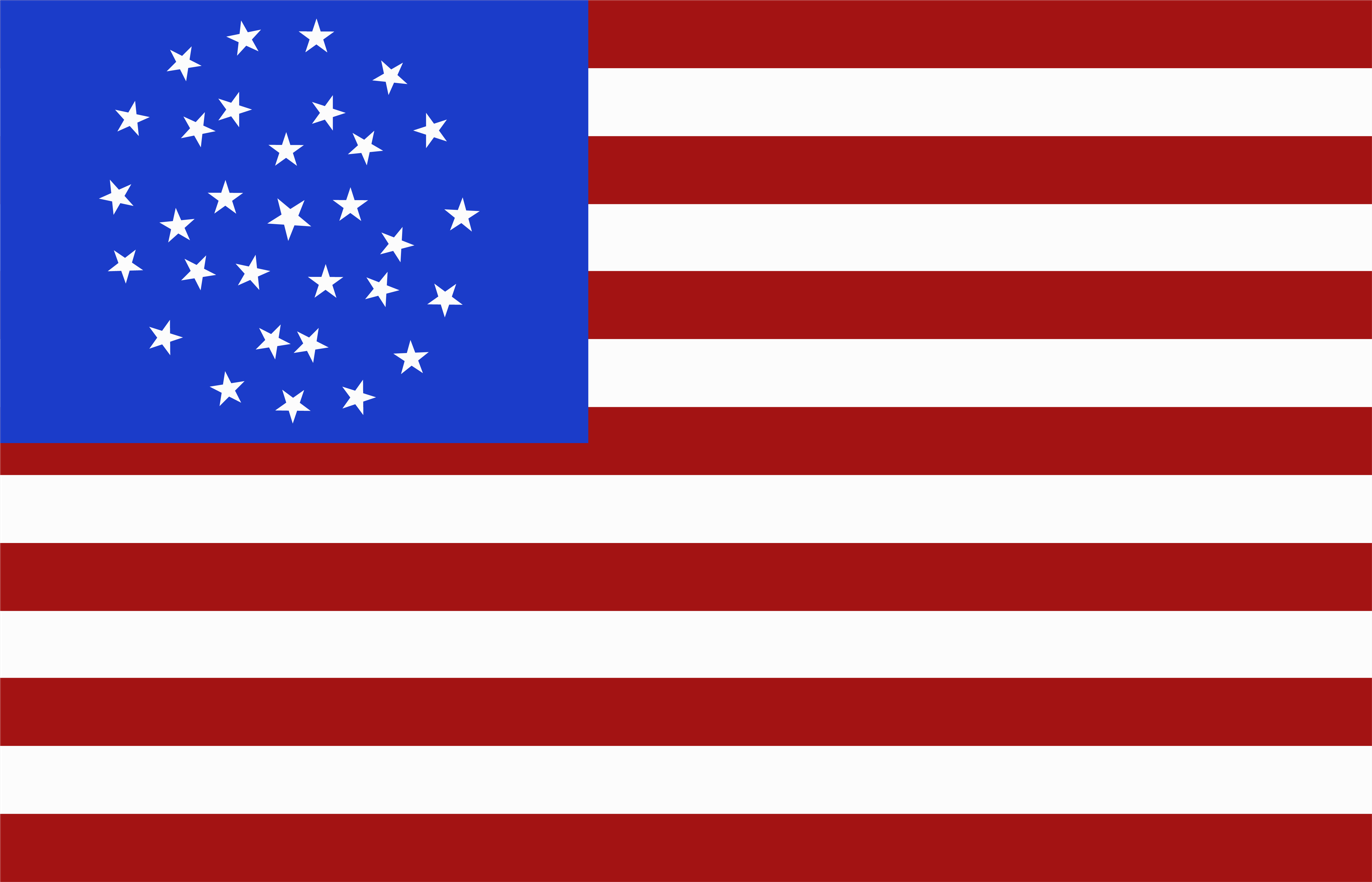
Flag carried by Company A

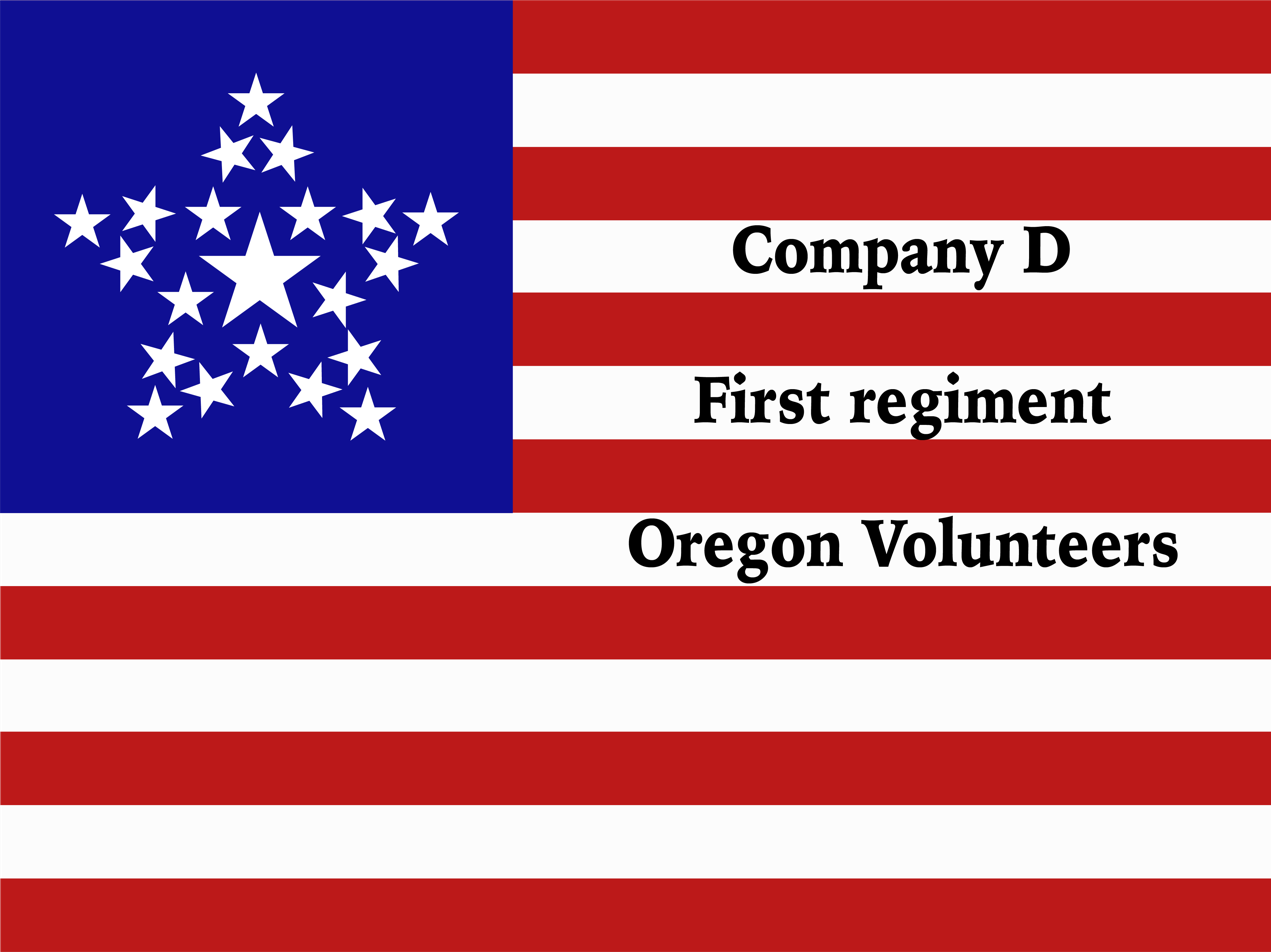
Digital reconstruction of the flag carried by Company D

== Battle of Walla Walla ==
Six companies of the Oregon Mounted Volunteers, under Lt. Col. James Kelley, crossed into Frenchtown in the Walla Walla Valley December 7, 1855, skirmishing with the tribes for three days ending on December 11, 1855, and, eventually, capturing Piupiumaksmaks and several other chiefs. It turned out to be the longest battle fought during the Yakima War. Fighting alongside the Walla Walla were members of several different tribes, such as the Cayuse, Palouse and Yakima. The eastern tribes which had been mostly non-participant in the war were now firmly involved in the conflict.
