= Cascade (1864 sternwheeler) =

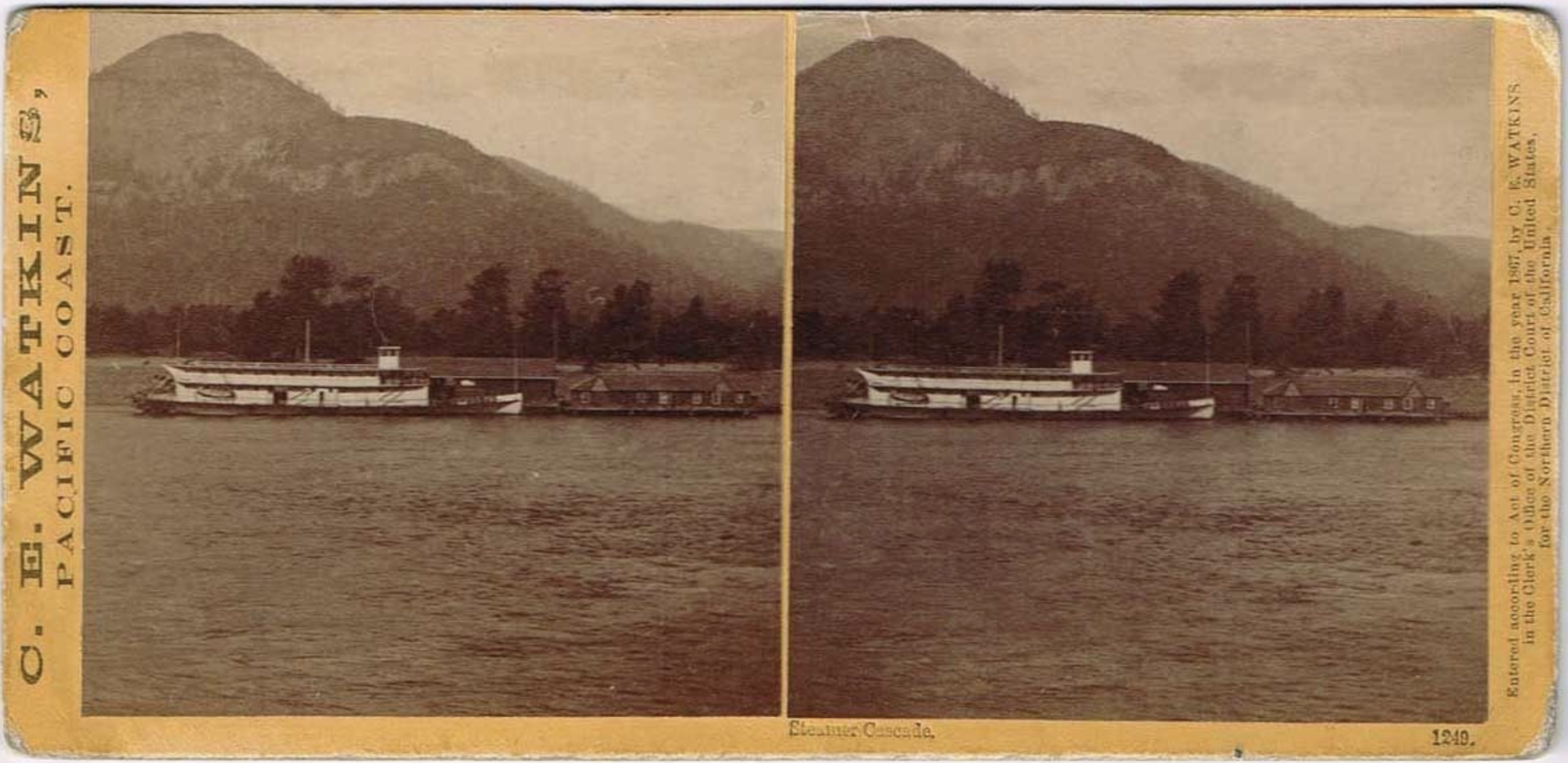
- Stereograph of stern-wheel steamer Cascade in the Columbia Gorge in 1867

History
- Name: Cascade
- Owner: Oregon Steam Navigation Company
- Port of registry: Portland, Oregon
- Route: Lower Columbia River
- Builder: Washington Territory Transportation Company
- In service: 1865
- Out of service: 1870
- Identification: U.S. registry 5263
- Fate: Abandoned

General characteristics
- Type: inland multi-purpose
- Tonnage: 401.25 GRT
- Length: 155 ft (47.2 m)
- Beam: 27.5 ft (8.4 m)
- Depth: 5.9 ft (2 m) depth of hold
- Installed power: twin single-cylinder steam engines
- Propulsion: stern-wheel
- Speed: 15 mph (24 km/h)

Cascade (also seen as Cascades) was a stern-wheel-driven steamboat built in Oregon which operated on the lower Columbia and the lower Willamette rivers. The vessel ran from 1864 to 1870, mainly under the ownership of the Oregon Steam Navigation Company.

== Decision to build ==
In 1864, which was reported to have been a good year for business in the Washington Territory, three entrepreneurs named Donohue, and Captains William Kohl, and Alexander P. Ankeny, formed the Washington Territory Transportation Company. The company's objective was to compete with the Oregon Steam Navigation Company for steamboat business on the Columbia River. To this end, the company built, at Utsalady, Washington Territory, on Camano Island a sternwheeler named Cascade (or Cascades).

== Construction and performance ==
Cascade was able to reach 15 miles per hour (24 km/h) and had a large carrying capacity. The merchant vessel registry number was 5263. The dimensions of the steamer were: length 155 ft (47.2 m); beam 27.5 ft (8.4 m); depth of hold 5.9 ft (2 m). The steam engines generated 94 horsepower (70 kW). The engines first used had cylinders that were 16 inches (41 cm) in diameter with a piston stroke of 72 inches (180 cm). The replacement engines in 1865 were 18 1/2 by 72 inches (47 by 183 cm).

In a non-contemporaneous source (1895) Cascade was reported to have been the first sternwheeler with a wheelhouse, which was an innovation by engineer John Gates. This may have been true for the Columbia River, but in fact the sternwheeler Enterprise, built at Canemah, Oregon in 1863, also had a wheelhouse, but was operated solely on the upper Willamette River.

== Service history ==
Upon completion, Cascade was sent to the Columbia River carrying machinery for two other steamers which the owners expected to build on the Columbia. Cascade arrived at Portland, Oregon on September 5, 1864, and immediately began a refit, making a trial trip on January 23, 1865, with Captain Van Bergen at the wheel. Before Cascade could engage in serious competition, the Oregon Steam Navigation Company started paying her owners a monthly stipend on condition that they would keep Cascade idle.

In July 1865 OSN purchased Cascade outright, installed larger engines in the vessel, and placed it on the route running from Portland to the Cascade Rapids in the Columbia Gorge. As of September 22, 1865, Cascade was running daily (except Sundays) on the lower Columbia River from Portland to the depot of the Cascades portage railroad at the foot of the Cascade Rapids. Cascade departed from the depot at 5:00 a.m. bound for Portland under the command of Captain John Wolfe (or Wolf). The portage railroad connected at the top of the Cascade Rapids with the steamer Oneonta, which would then carry passengers and freight east upstream to The Dalles. From The Dalles, another portage railroad skirted the Celilo Rapids to connect with steamers that carried traffic further upriver to Wallula, Washington Territory.

== Disposition ==
In 1870 according to non-contemporaneous sources, Cascade was either abandoned or dismantled. Contemporaneous sources report differently. In November 1870, Cascade was being rebuilt in Portland at the OSN "boneyard." A new hull was built, and staterooms were added along the entire length of the cabin. The upper berths in the staterooms were single, and the lower ones were double. The rebuilt vessel would differ from other steamboats in that the aft part of the cabin would be open to allow passengers a better view of the passing scenery. The engines were being cleaned, and were to be replaced when the decking was complete. The work was nearing completion in early December 1870. As of 1874, had a gross register tonnage of 401.25. Tonnage in this instance was a measure of size and not weight.
