= Fort Henrietta Park =

Park in Umatilla County, Oregon, United States

Fort Henrietta Historic Park
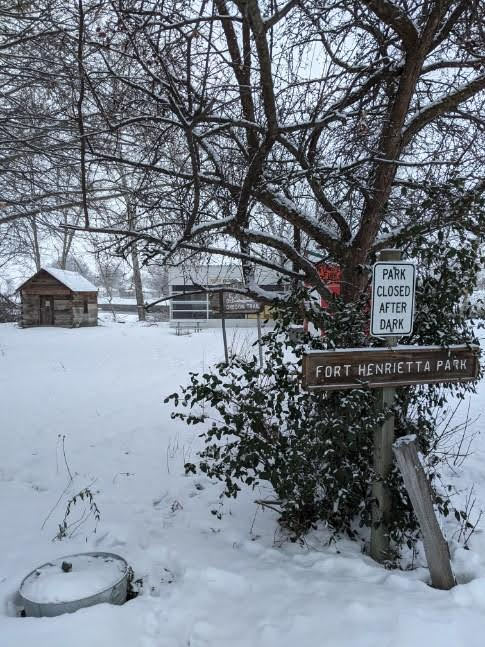
- Park Entrance Sign

- Location within Oregon Location within the United States
- Location: Umatilla County, Oregon, USA
- Nearest city: Echo, Oregon
- Coordinates: 45°44′31″N 119°11′54″W
- Area: 2 acres (0.81 ha)
- Established: 1988
- Governing body: National Park Service

Fort Henrietta Historic Park is a public urban park, located in the city of Echo, Oregon, United States. The park is located on the east bank of the Umatilla River and overlooks the original site of Utilla Indian Agency, the first agency for the Umatilla, Cayuse and Walla Walla Indian tribes in 1855 the Oregon Mounted Volunteers built Fort Henrietta on the agency site. The fort and agency were on the west river bank. The park is named for the fort which was named for Henrietta Haller, wife of Major Granville O. Haller, an American military officer during the Cayuse War.

The park is listed as a National Historic Trail Site because of its location along the Oregon Trail where emigrants frequently camped on their pass through northern Oregon. The south end of the park was known as the Lower Crossing of the Umatilla River for the Oregon Trail originally and later for the stage and freight roads. The Upper Crossing is located in the City of Pendleton, Oregon.

== History ==
Archeological excavations from the Fort Henrietta-Utilla Indian Agency Site found at least seasonal occupation by Native Americans going back over 3500 years, probably as a transportation hub due to the Umatilla River from prehistoric times.

In 1851 an Indian agency for the Umatilla, Cayuse and Walla Walla people was set up with a post office across the Umatilla River. The post office served as one of the stations for the postal route between The Dalles and Salt Lake City. In 1855 the Agency was burned down by the Cayuse during the Yakima War after which the Oregon militia built a frontier outpost called Fort Henrietta. In November that same year the Oregon Mounted Volunteers built the 100 square foot fort on the site of the destroyed Umatilla Indian Agency.

== Amenities ==
Displays in the Fort Henrietta Park interpret the former U.S. Army fort, which was staffed from 1855 to 1856, the interactions between European Americans and Native Americans in roughly the same period, and both logging equipment and a replica of a frontier-era blockhouse that housed the first Umatilla County Jail. Within the collection, there is a covered wagon museum, antique fire equipment, and a public access point to the river. The Fort overlooks the Umatilla River. The park includes a small recreational vehicle (RV) park and campground, a playground, and a skate park.
