= Tom Hill (scout) =

Lenape mountain man (1811–1860)

Tom Hill (1811–1860) was a Lenape mountain man active in the American frontier. He first became prominent in the service of Kit Carson as a fur trapper during the 1830s. After that, he lived among the Nimíipuu, influencing them to mistrust ABCFM missionaries. Throughout 1847, Hill was In Alta California fighting in the service of John C. Frémont. Tom Hill returned to Kansas in 1854 to live among fellow Lenape, where he died in 1860. Several later historians have named Hill as the primary cause of the Whitman Massacre, earning him some notoriety.

== Early life ==
Hill was born in the vicinity of Upper Sandusky, Ohio, where his family had been granted land by the Federal government in 1817. He likely attended the mission school in Upper Sandusky for at least some period of time before adulthood. In 1833, when Hill was 22, he joined a six-man trapping expedition led by Kit Carson, which also included Joseph Meek and two other Lenapes. They operated between the Cimarron and Arkansas rivers, at that time controlled by the Comanche. During their excursion, they were met in battle by 200 Comanche warriors, and the trappers had to make a protective wall with their mule mounts. After several hours of skirmishing, the Comanche relented, and the trappers all survived. The three Lenape men in Carson's employ continued with him, eventually reaching the Yellowstone River in 1837. The group encountered a Niitsitapi village, and a battle. The previous Lenape officer in charge perished, and Hill was elected to his position. Hill remained with Carson until 1839, operating out of Santa Fe de Nuevo México, at Taos.

== Time among Nimíipuu ==
After he and Carson parted ways, Hill spent several years living among the Nimíipuu, an ethnic group he had interacted with for several years at the annual rendezvous. Hill's leadership in confrontations against Niitsitapi band while they hunted bison earned him a place of respect and he married a member of the band. Hill taught the Nimíipuu and later the neighboring Liksiyu about the loss of territorial sovereignty among Native Americans east of the Rocky Mountains to the expansionist United States of America. These stories incensed men from both Indigenous nations to mistrust ABCFM stations established on the Columbia Plateau. Henry H. Spalding decried Hill as "a most blasphemous debassed [sic] infidel... who has been some years in the Mts. spreading his poison..."

In a party of Nimíipuu led Ellis however, Hill visited the Waiilatpu Mission and dined with Marcus and Narcissa Whitman along with the fellow families there in 1845. Hill was to remain at the Mission for about two weeks. Catherine Sager Pringle recalled that Hill was "very intelligent and could speak English as well as Cayuse [actually Niimiipuutímt]." Visitors and mission residents had a meal primarily of corn mush and tea, with minor entertainment provided by the visiting natives. Hill then made a two-hour-long speech, reportedly being "quite eloquent." In conversation with Marcus Whitman, Hill assured the doctor that his feelings toward him were positive. Whitman recorded that "...he had been much deceived by reports of the Indians from this quarter [about ABCFM missionaries]..." After returning from the Mission, Hill told William Craig that he found Whitman a far more favorable man than his contemporary missionary Spalding.

=== Role in Whitman massacre ===
Tom Hill has been blamed by some historians for inducing the Whitman massacre, as he was "...the bitter enemy of the white man's religion and everything else related to whites." In particular, William Marshall declared that Hill was "constantly striving to stir up the Indians against all the whites" during his time among the Nimíipuu. Marshall concluded that "...it is doubtful if any other one influence was as potent as Tom Hill in ... bringing on the Whitman massacre."

This assessment has been questioned by later historians, with more focus given to the simmering cultural clashes between the Indigenous and the Missionaries along with the spread of infectious diseases on the Columbian Plateau. Francis Haines in particular stated that while his teachings "undoubtedly helped cause the Whitman massacre... he had no part in plotting the attack."

== Alta California ==
During 1846, Tom Hill joined a small party of Sahaptins destined for New Helvetia. Two years prior, Walla Walla noble Piupiumaksmaks visited the settlement, though his son died in a confrontation there. Piupiumaksmaks wished to return to the area to reaffirm positive relations with John Sutter. Hill and the group entered Alta California during the tumultuous Mexican–American War, at the beginning of the Conquest of California. John C. Frémont called for volunteers to join in the California Battalion, with several Walla Wallas serving as scouts. Hill enlisted into a white company, for a salary of $25 monthly. The military company was headed south towards Monterey when several hundred Mexican forces were encountered at Battle of Natividad. Hill was a part of a small scouting party that encountered the enemy forces, and had to fight them unaided for four hours. After some time exchanging salvos from afar, Tom reportedly called out to the Mexicans "You come here, me kill you. You can't fight better than one woman." His insult angered several Mexicans, charging on horseback. The ensuing skirmish was later described in 1879:

The strife was soon over, for as soon as the Spaniard made the first pass, Tom parried the thrust and struck the Spaniard in the forehead with his tomahawk, which brought him to the ground, where he deliberately tore off his scalp. During the remainder of the battle the Spaniards kept at long range, not caring to come within close quarters with Haze and his Indians.

At the end of the battle that evening, the Americans feared that they were surrounded by Mexican forces. Hill volunteered to slip past the enemies and travel to Monterrey where Frémont was located. A small Mexican group was alerted to him however and began to pursue him. Hill "...with the most extraordinary dexterity and bravery", killed four of his pursuers with his tomahawk. He managed to reach Frémont's camp the next day. Hill was given command over the Native scouts in Monterrey and continued to march south with the main army. Hill made several attempts to engage Californio scouts, but no engagements occurred. For his service P. B. Reading gave Hill a silver tomahawk, and three months pay.

== Later life ==
After his service with the California Battalion, Hill spent another year in California. He relocated to Kansas in the autumn of 1854, and was granted 120 acres by the Federal government due to being a veteran. After Tom Hill died in 1860, John Sarcoxie was given mandate over his estate.
