= Perdana Botanical Gardens =

Urban park in Kuala Lumpur, Malaysia

Coordinates: 3.1430001°N 101.68466°E

- Taman Botani Perdana 湖滨公园 ஏரி பூங்கா
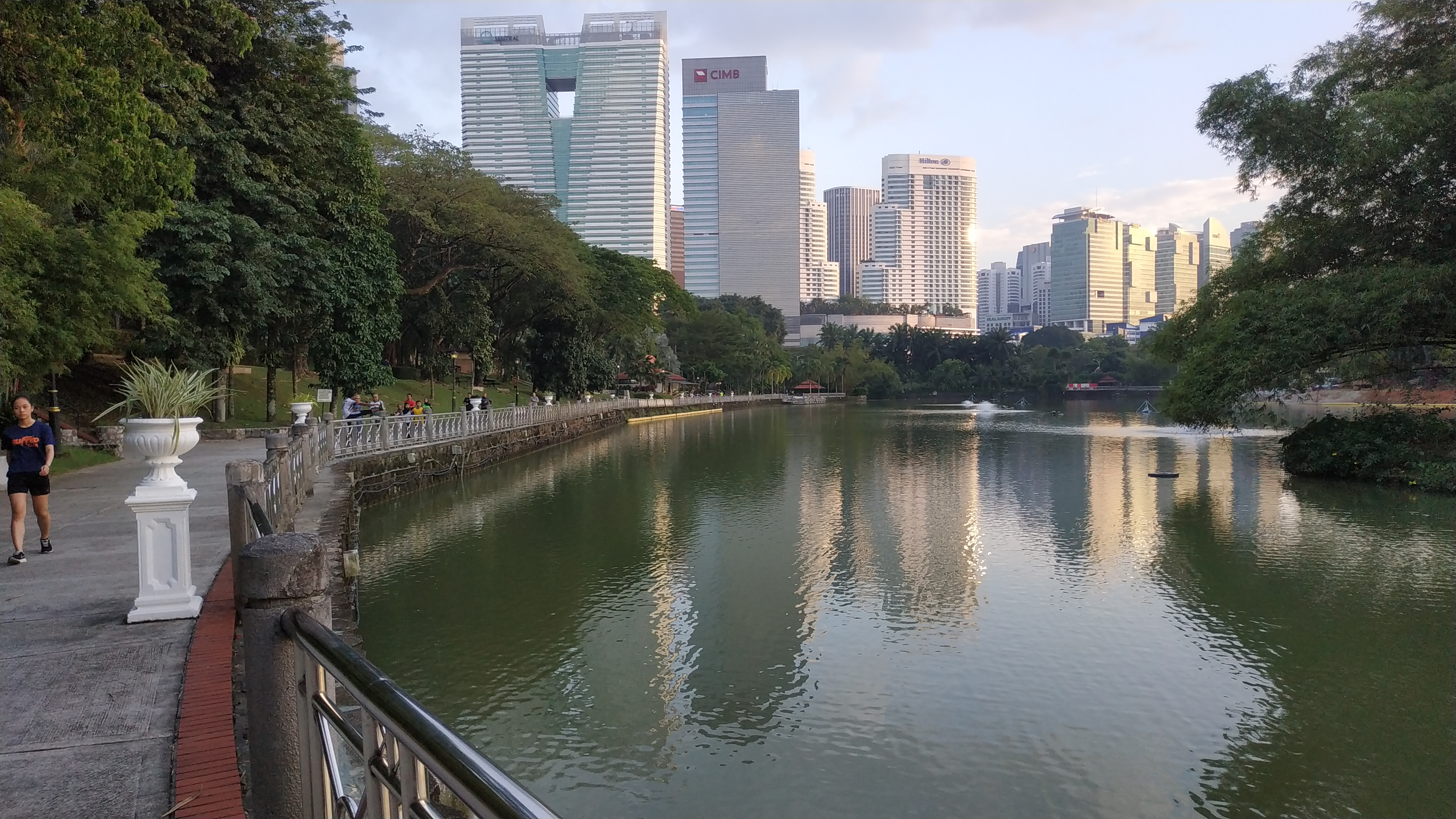
- Interactive map of Perdana Botanical Gardens
- Type: Urban park
- Location: Lembah Pantai, Kuala Lumpur, Malaysia
- Area: 91.6 hectares (226 acres)
- Created: 1888
- Operator: Kuala Lumpur City Hall
- Status: Open year-round
- Website: klbotanicalgarden.gov.my

Perdana Botanical Gardens (Malay: Taman Botani Perdana), formerly Perdana Lake Gardens, Lake Gardens, and Public Gardens, is Kuala Lumpur's first large-scale recreational park. Measuring 91.6 hectares (226 acres), it is located in the heart of the city and established in 1888. The park served as place of refuge from the hustle and bustle of the city during colonial times. It contains large sculpted and manicured gardens and a host of attractions.

== History ==
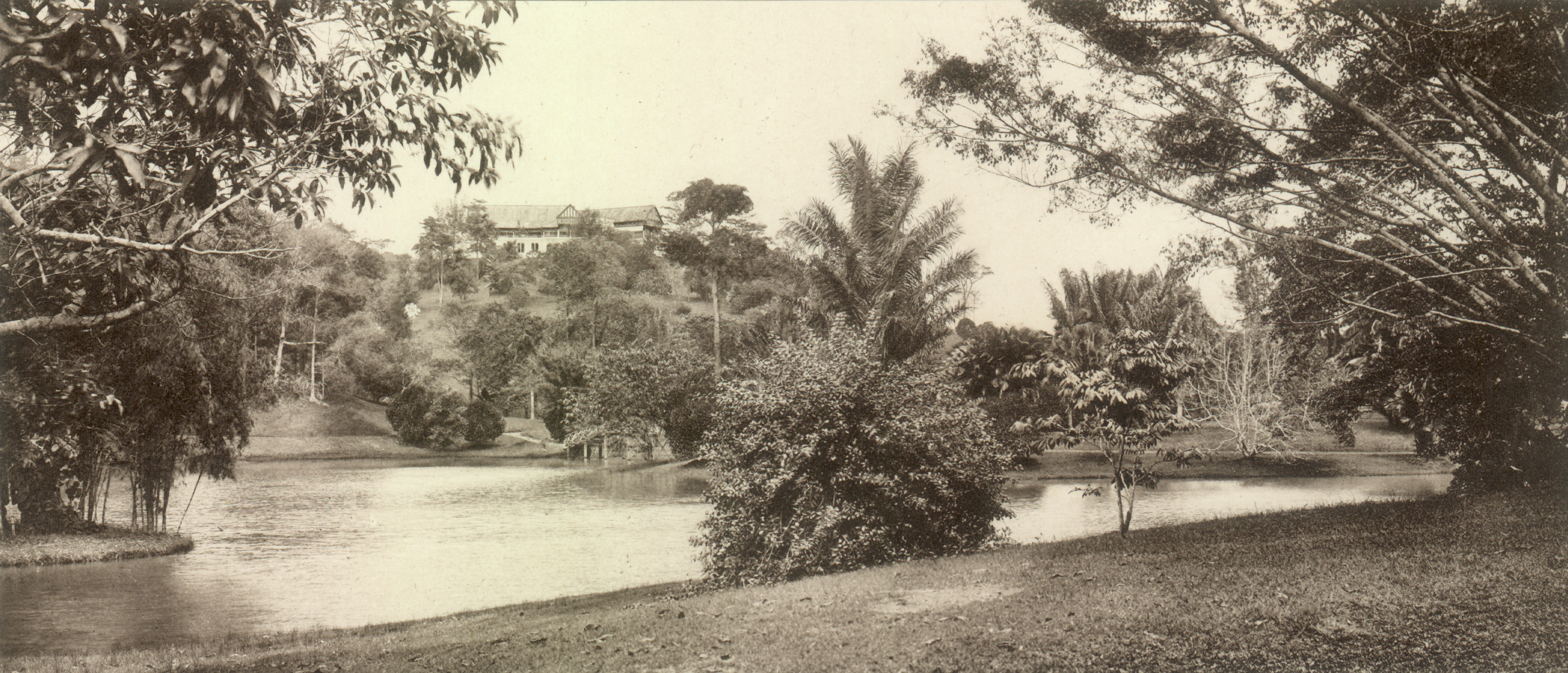
Old view of Lake Gardens with the governor's residence, Carcosa, on a hill in the background, c. 1910.

The colonial-era park was the brainchild of Alfred Venning, the British State Treasurer of Selangor in the late 19th century. In 1888, Venning proposed that a botanical garden be built in the valley of Sungei Bras Bras. The British Resident Frank Swettenham agreed to the scheme and authorised a small grant from the State funds for the garden. Venning laid out the plan for a park of 173 acres (700,000 m^{2}) which included an "experimental economic garden" and a lake.

Venning cleared the area of scrubs and lalang, and planted ornamental flowering trees and shrubs in the garden. The scheme attracted public support, and a leading figure of the Cantonese community, Towkay Chow Ah Yeok, contributed a hundred chempaka and orange trees to the initial planting programme in 1888. An ornamental lake was created by damming up Sungei Bras Bras, which was then named Sydney Lake after Swettenham's wife (the lake is now known as Perdana Lake). The project took nearly ten years to complete, but the garden was formally opened on 13 May 1889, just a year after work began, by the Governor of the Straits Settlements, Sir Cecil Clementi Smith.

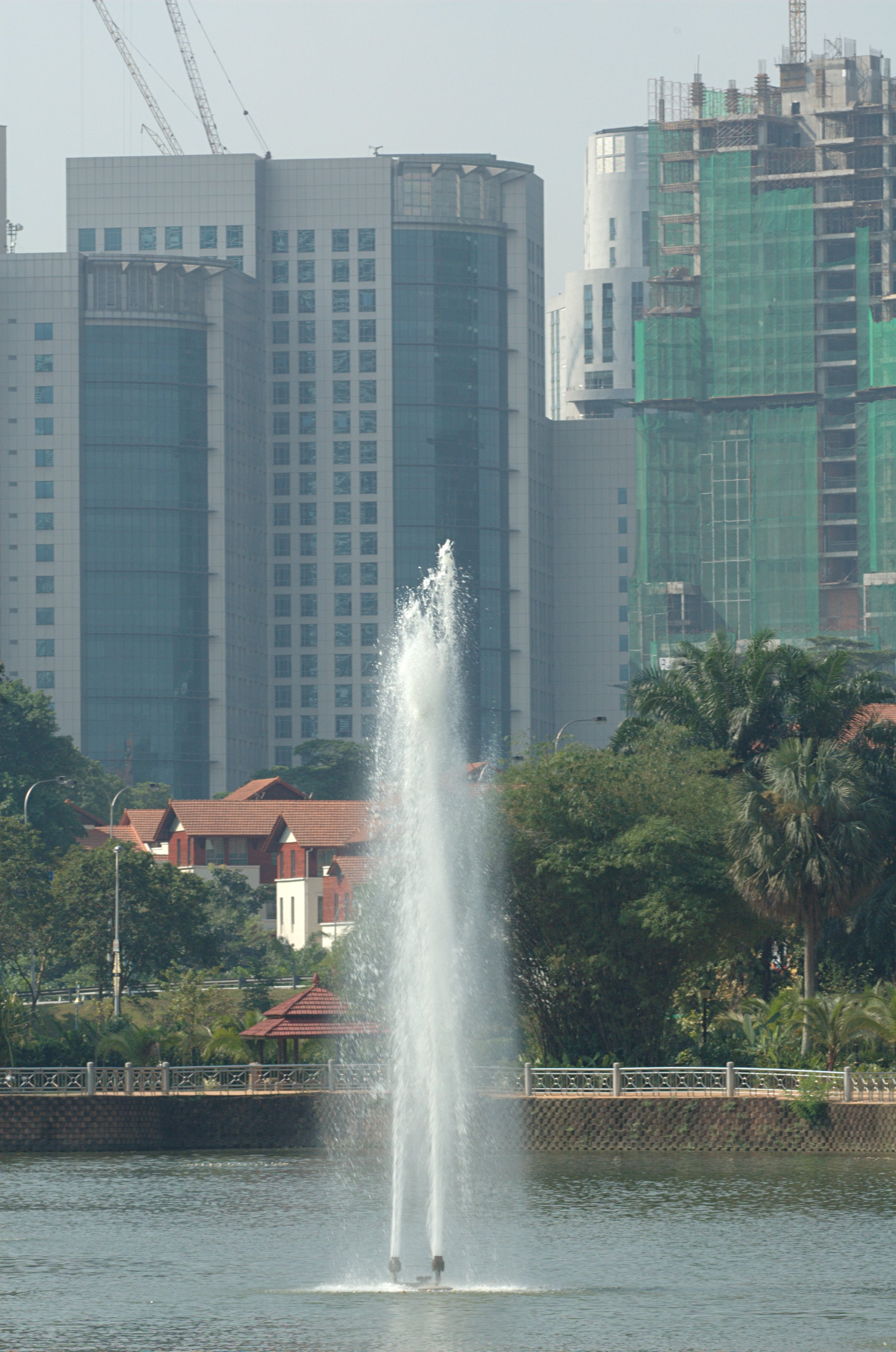
A fountain in Lake Gardens, Kuala Lumpur

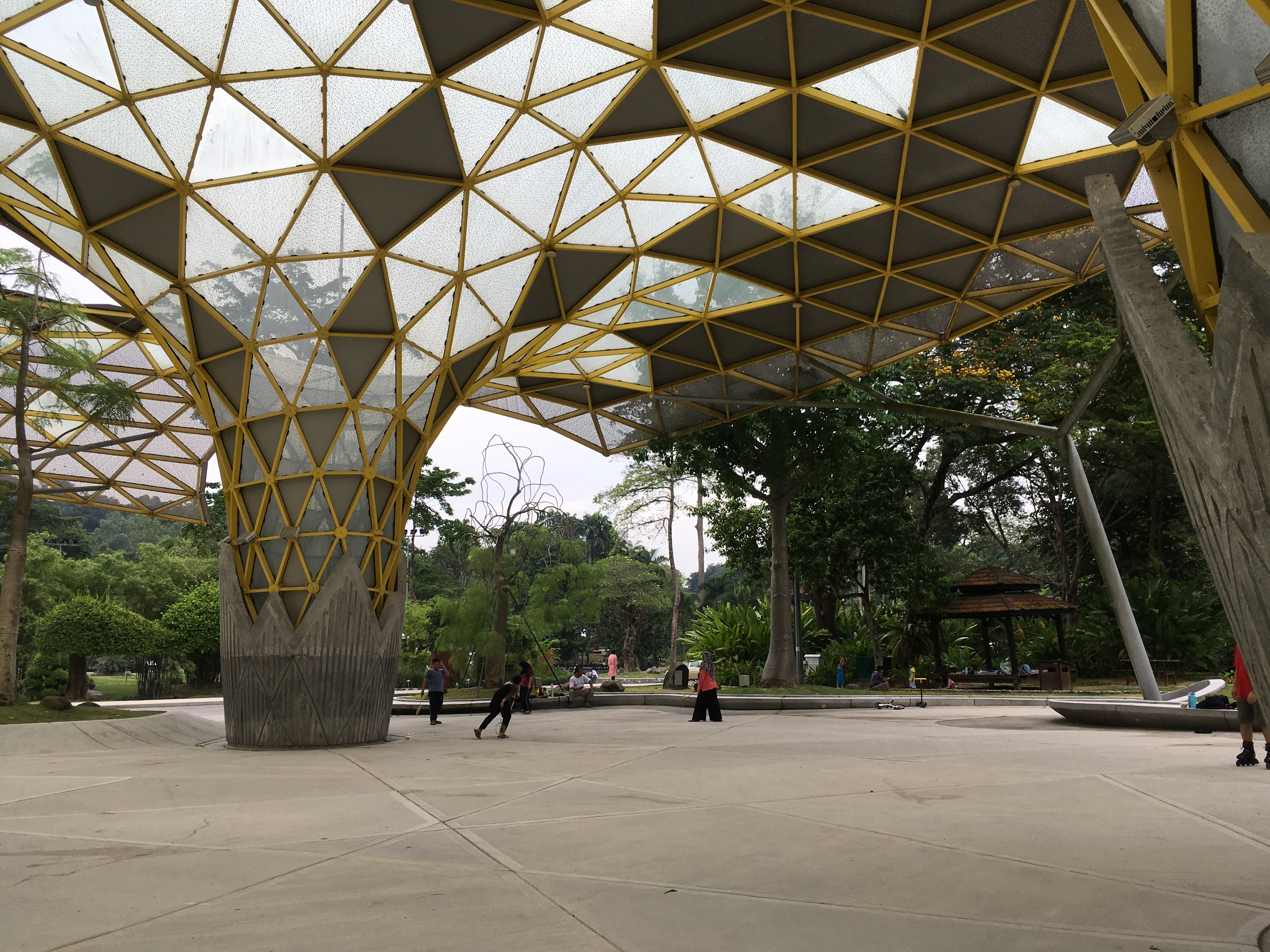
Canopy at the main square (Laman Perdana) of the garden

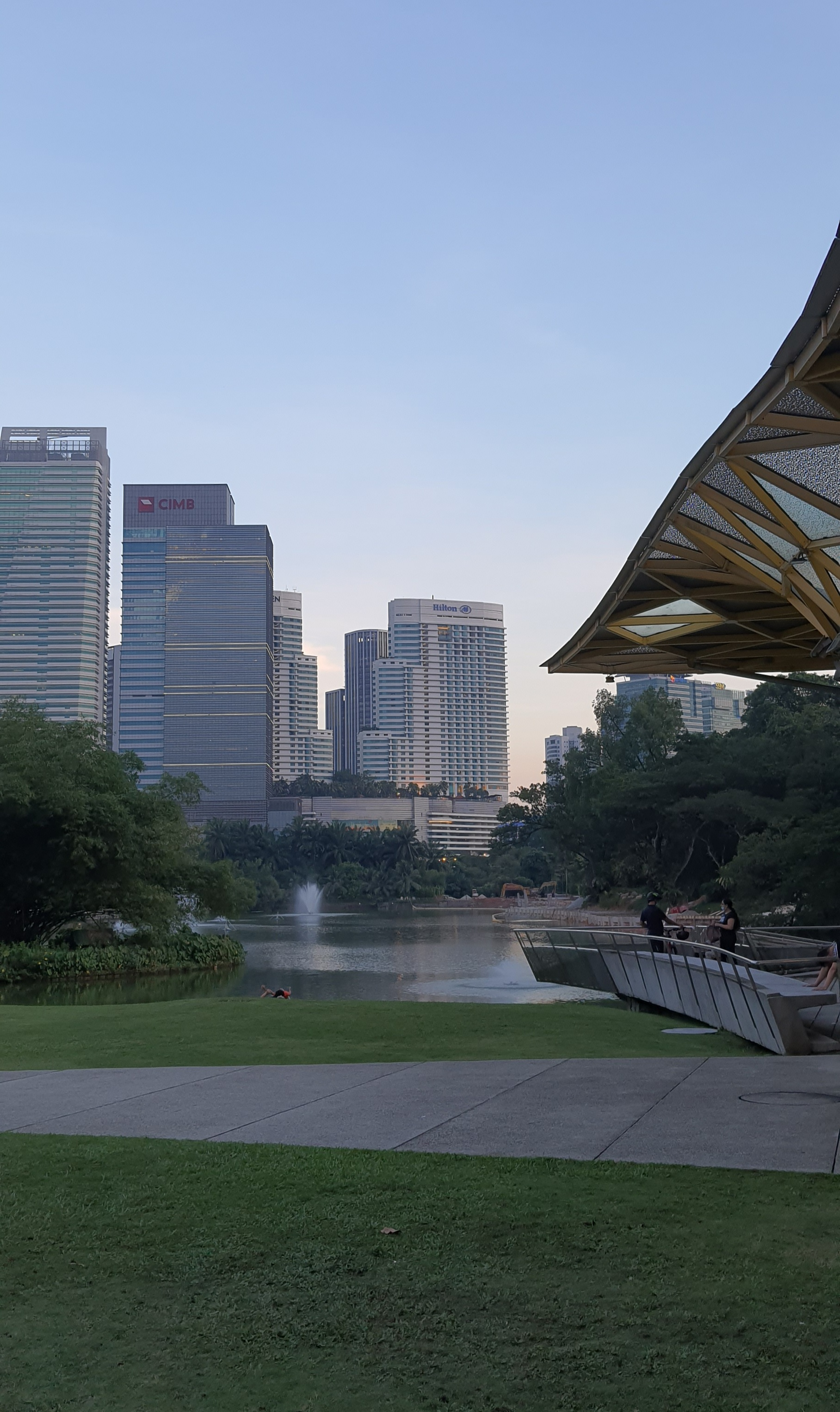
KL Sentral Station as seen from Perdana Botanical Gardens on a clear sunny evening

The official residence of the then British government representative Frank Swettenham, now known as Carcosa Seri Negara, was located atop a hill here. Venning also created a social club by the lake, the Lake Club (now known as the Royal Lake Club), in 1890. The club, unlike the Selangor Club, was an exclusively European club, and it would dominate the social scene for Europeans in Kuala Lumpur for over half a century.

In 1963, the Malaysian Houses of Parliament was built on the northern fringes of the park.

=== Naming ===
The park was initially called Public Gardens but later renamed Lake Gardens. In 1975, it was renamed Taman Tasik Perdana, or the Perdana Lake Gardens, by Tun Abdul Razak. On 28 June 2011, the gardens were renamed again to Perdana Botanical Gardens by Dato' Sri Najib Razak in the first phase of turning the park into a botanical garden.

== Location ==
The garden is located along Jalan Perdana or Venning Road. It is located near the National Museum of Malaysia. The nearest public transportation hub within walking distance is Muzium Negara MRT station.

== Places of interest ==
Among the attractions located in the Perdana Botanical Gardens are the deer park, Hibiscus garden, Orchid Garden, Kuala Lumpur Bird Park and Kuala Lumpur Butterfly Park. The Bird Park with a land area of over 20.9-acre (8.5 ha) was opened on 15 November 1991, features more than 3,000 birds from more than 200 species of bird and is billed as the world's largest covered bird park. The butterfly park was opened in 1992, spans over 80,000 sq ft (7,400 m^{2}) of landscaped garden with over 5,000 butterflies, exotic plants, butterfly-host plants and ferns and is one of the largest houses in the world.

== Gallery ==
Kuala Lumpur Butterfly Park

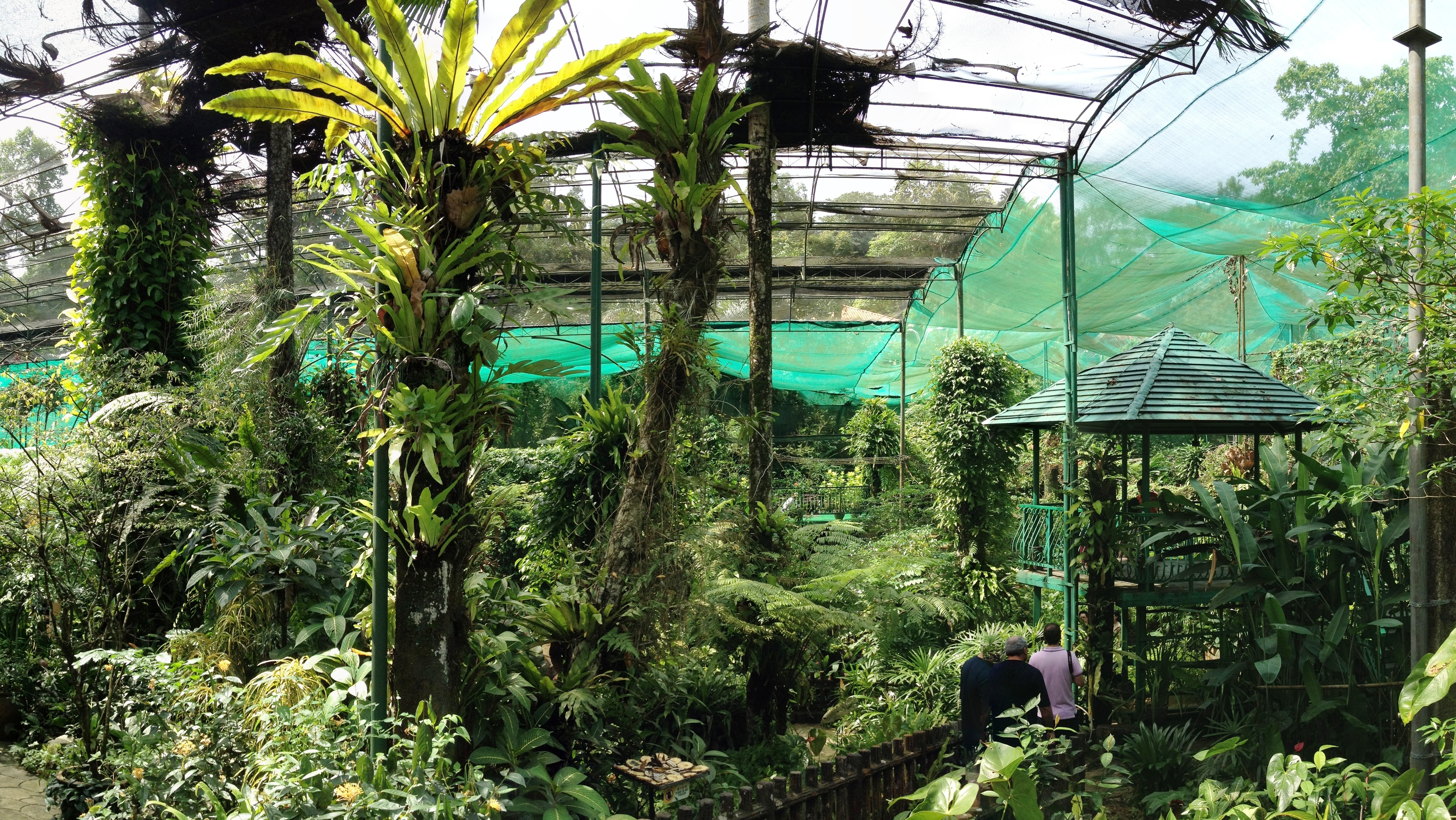
Kuala Lumpur Butterfly Park

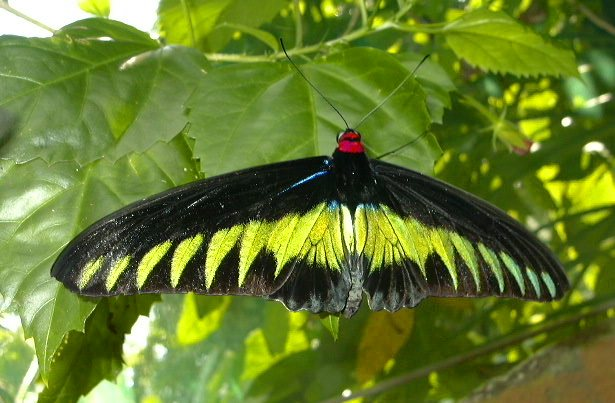
Trogonoptera brookiana, also known as Rajah Brooke's birdwing

Kuala Lumpur Bird Park

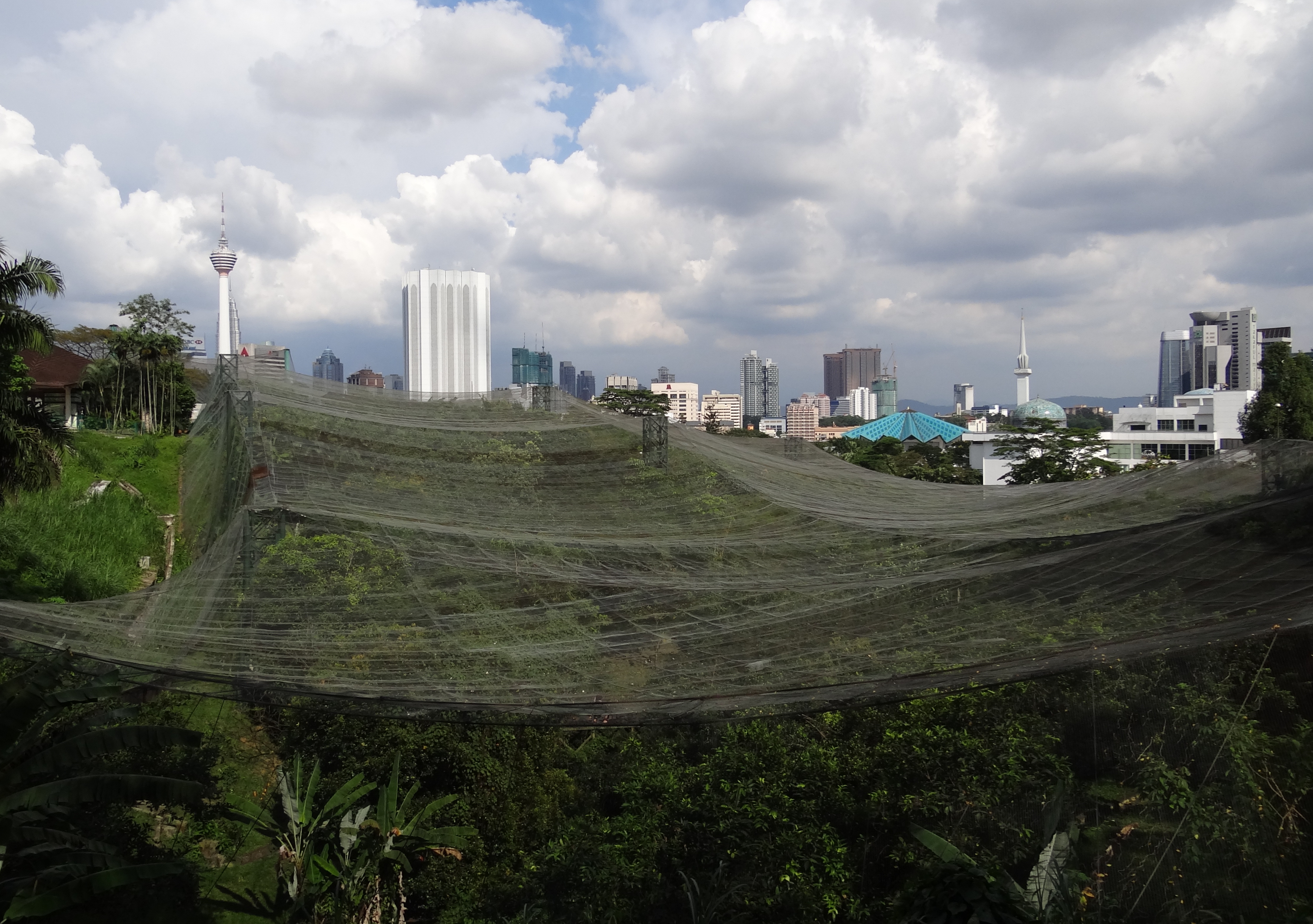
Kuala Lumpur Bird Park

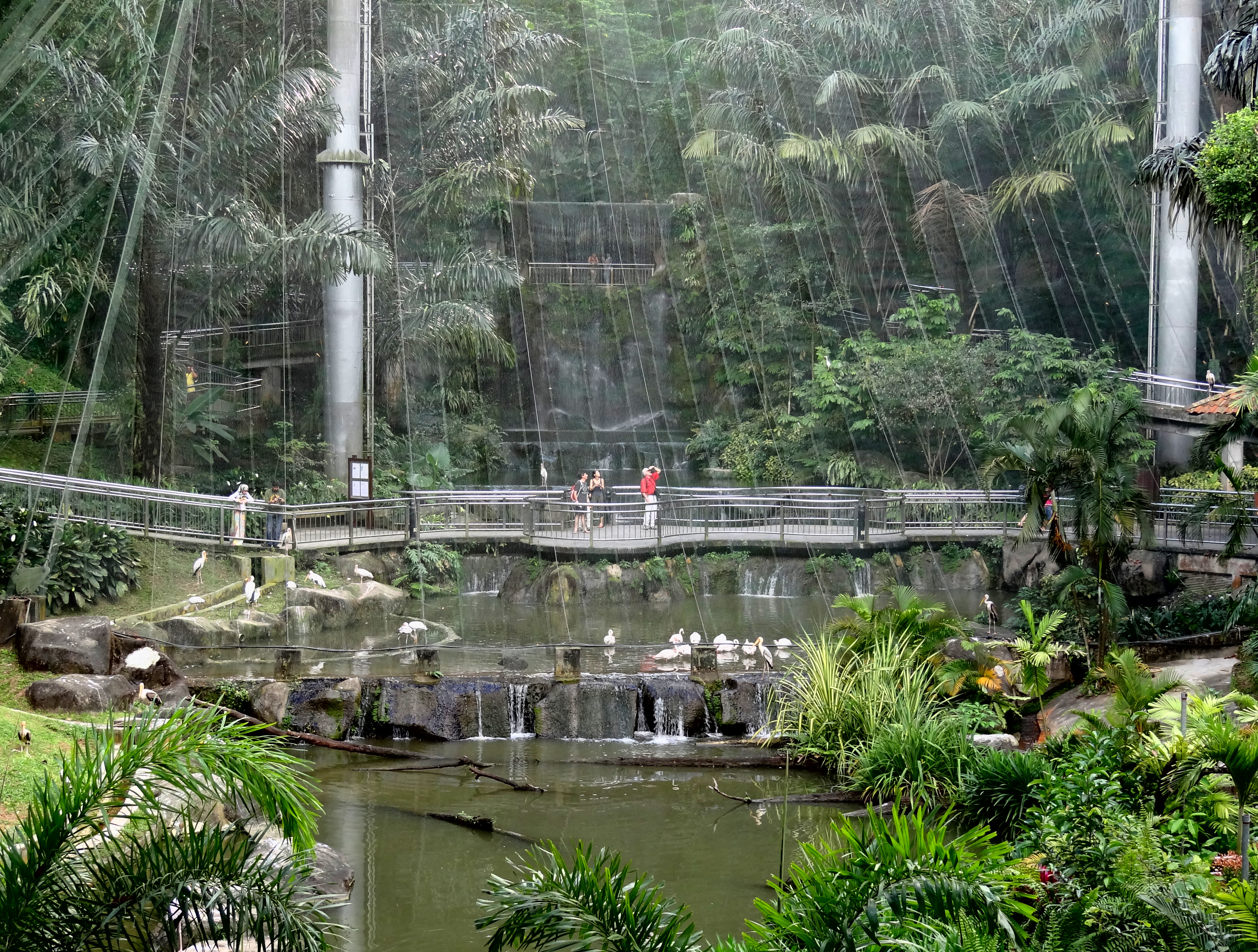
Bird Park interior

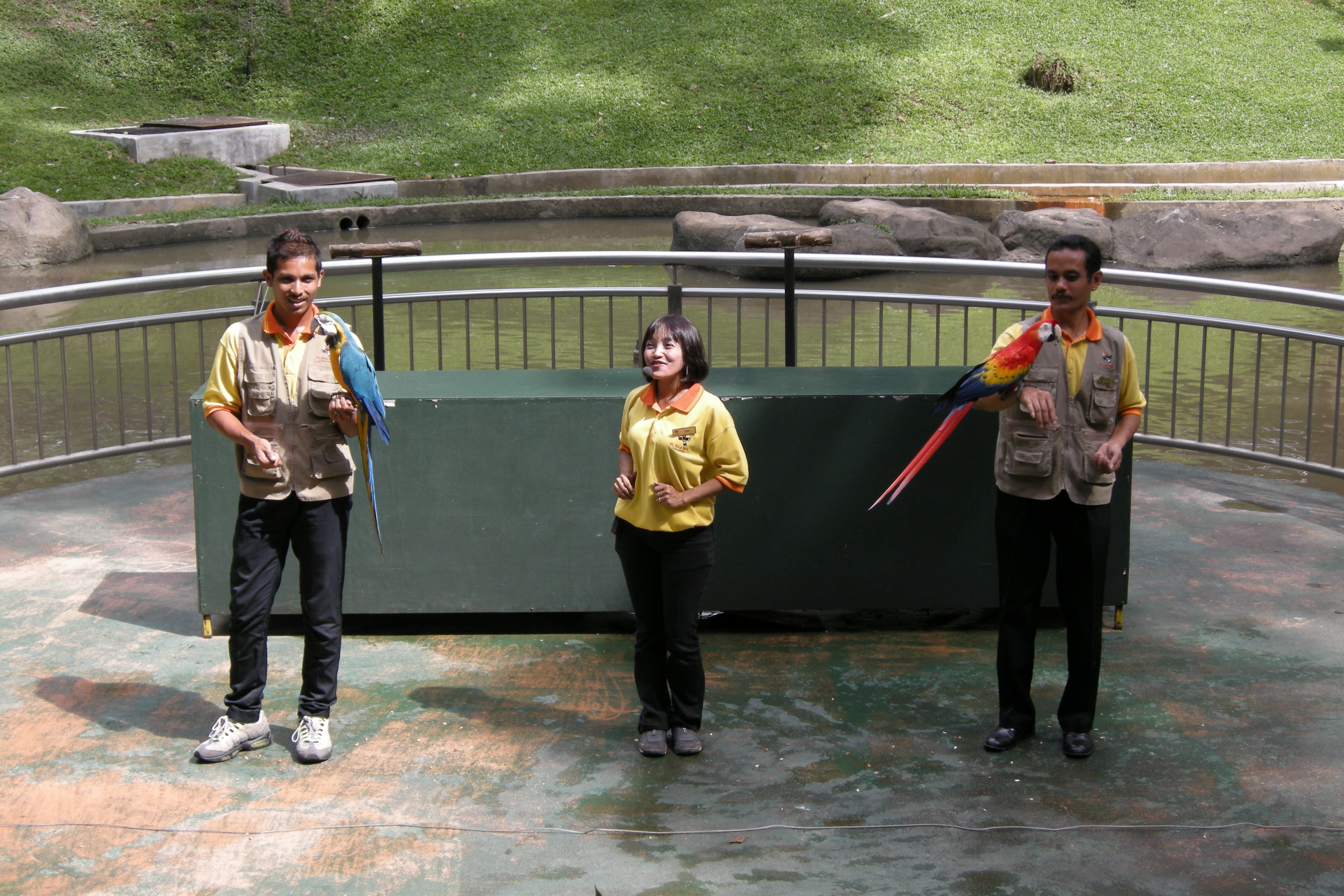
Performance

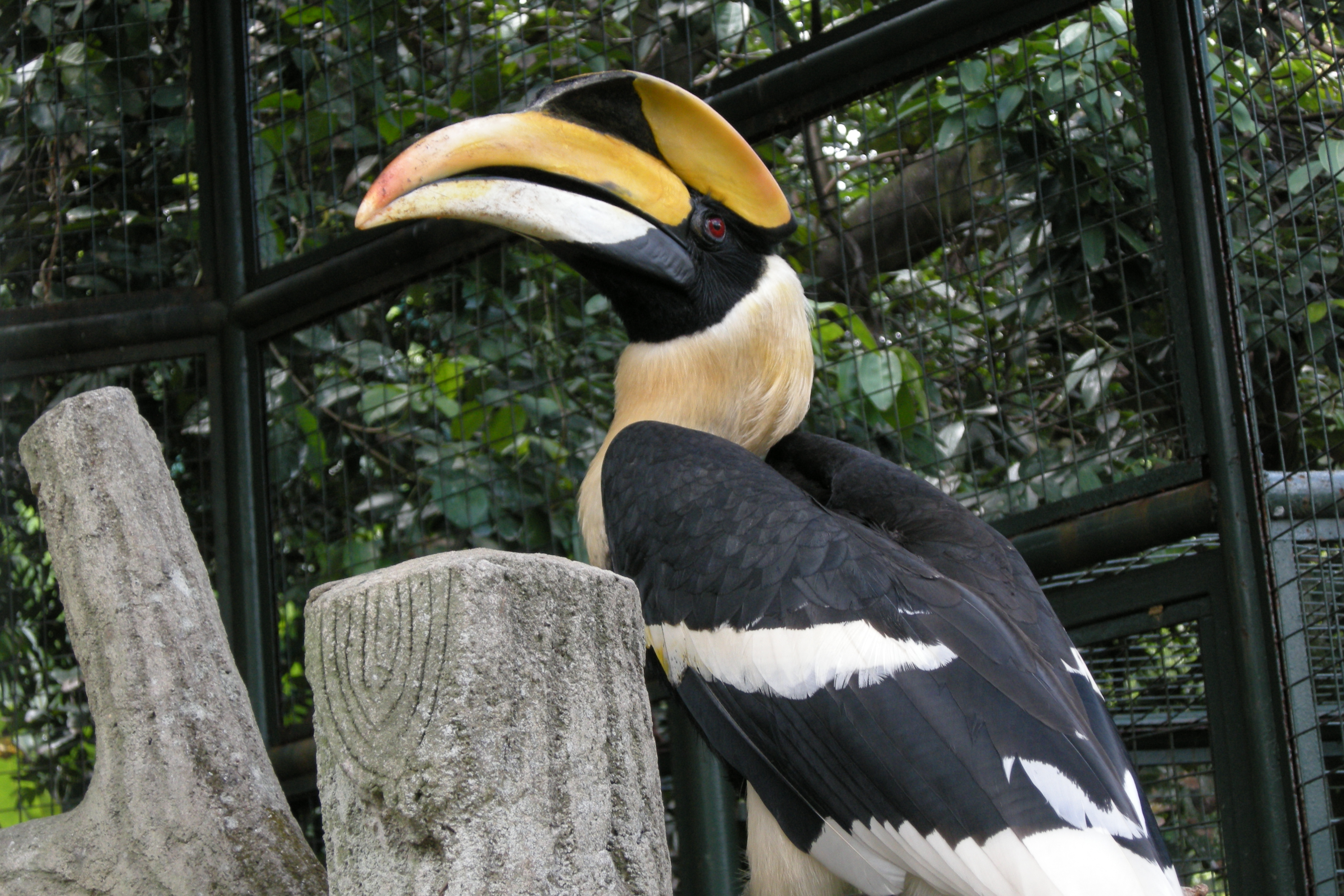
Great hornbill

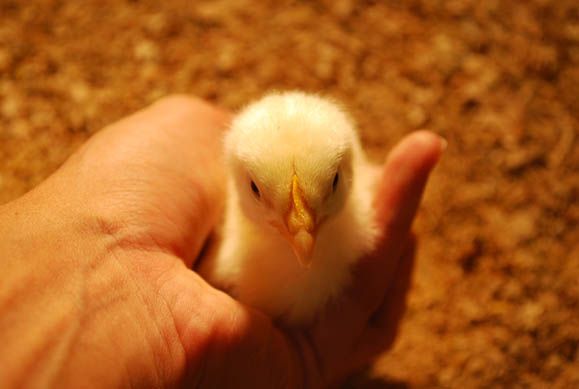
A chick in the education centre

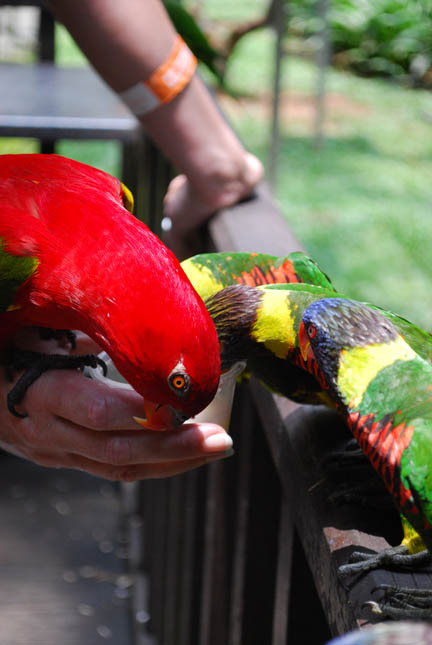
Feeding time for rainbow lorikeets and a red lory

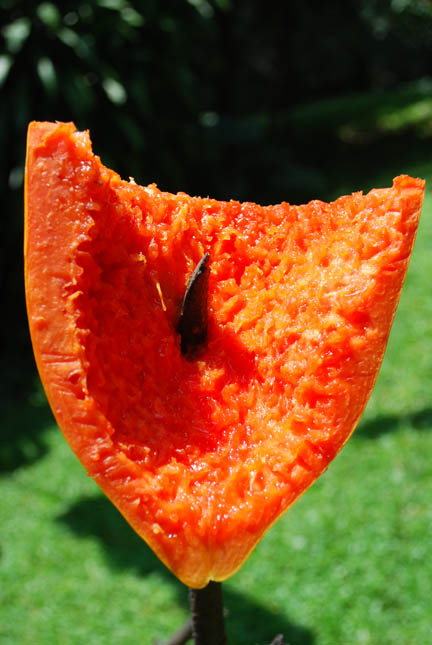
A slice of papaya for birds

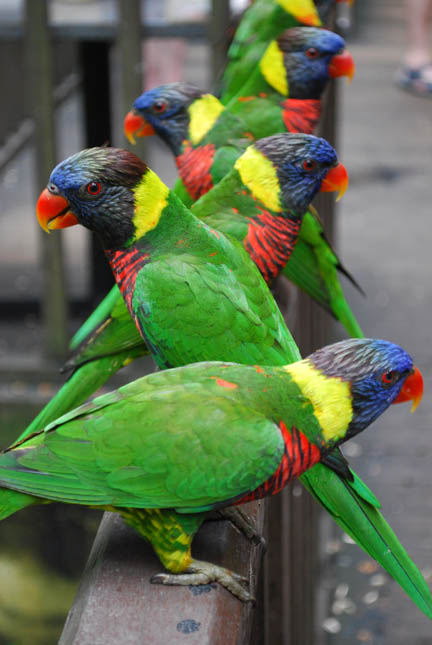
Rainbow lorikeets in KL Bird Park

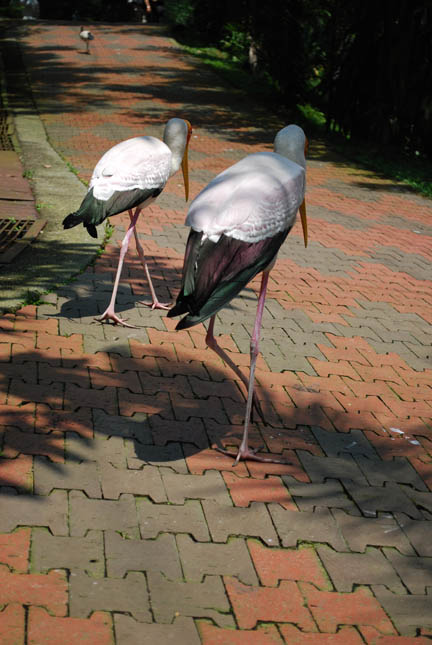
Milky storks

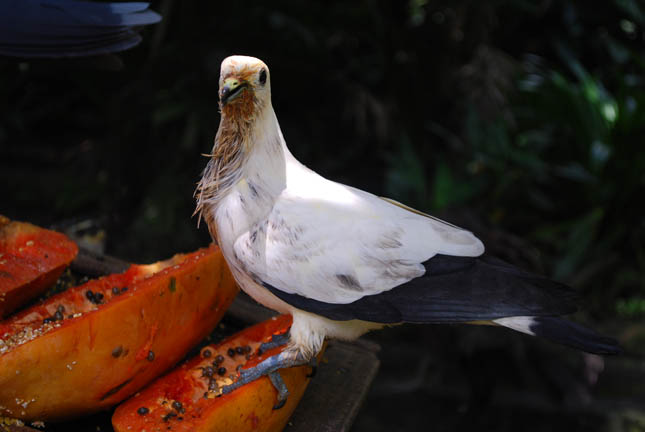
A bird feeding on a piece of papaya

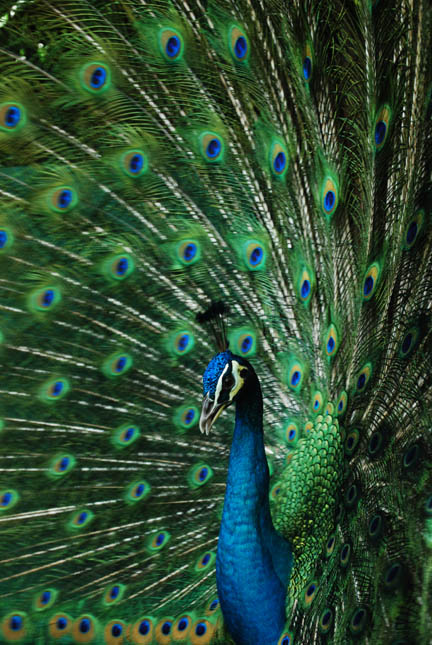
A peacock in the park

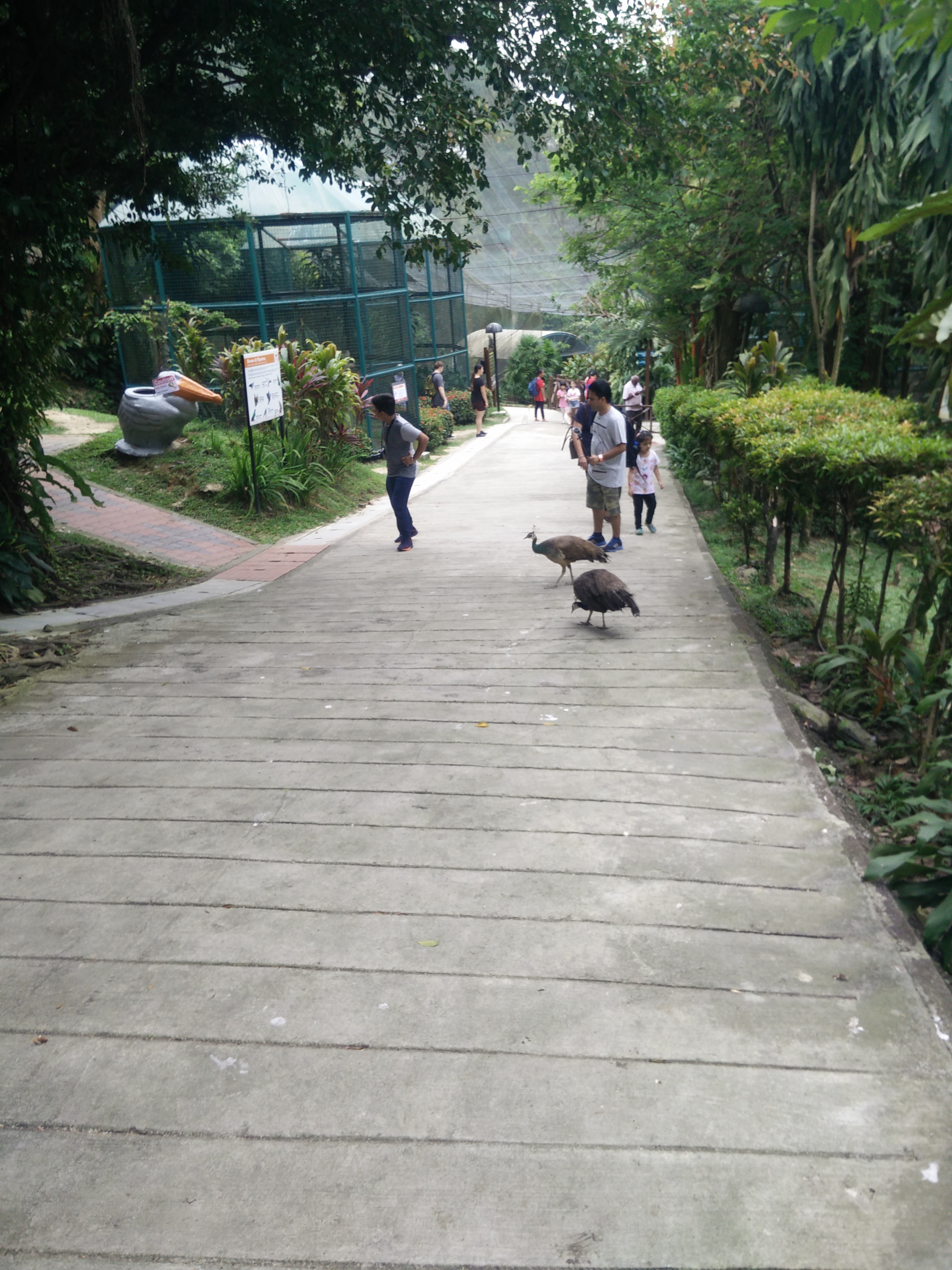
A view near the park entrance

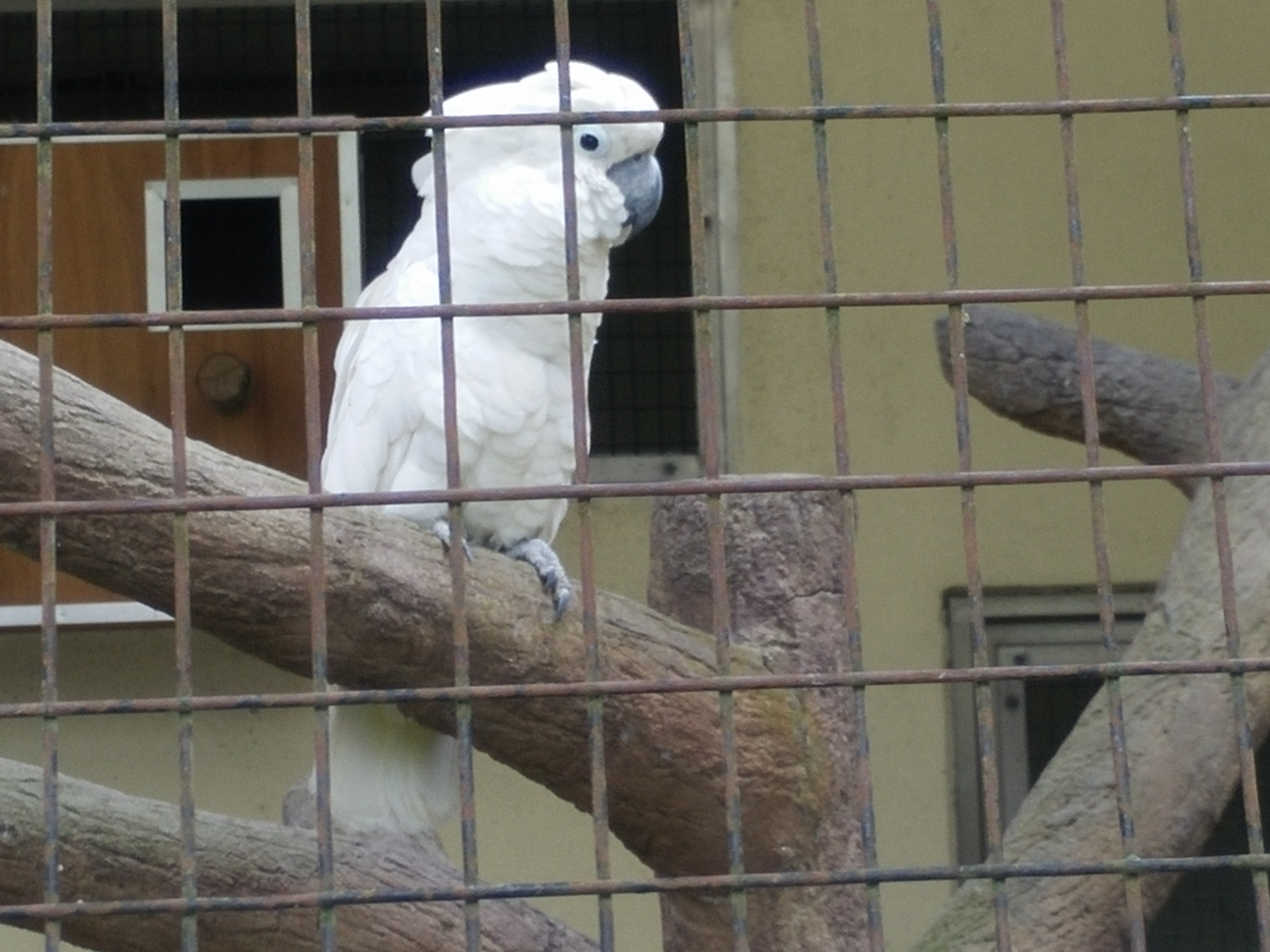
An umbrella cockatoo

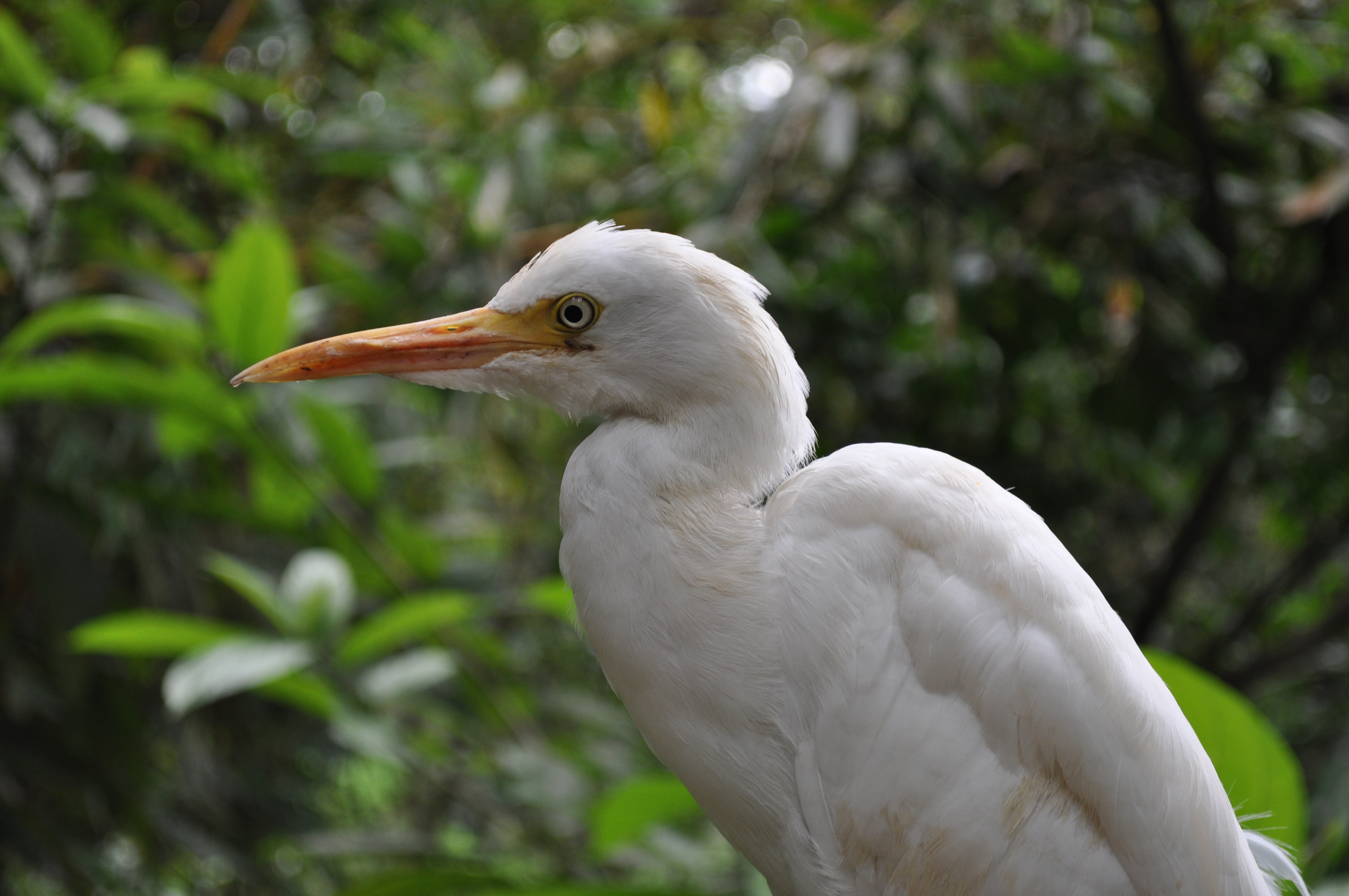
Egret

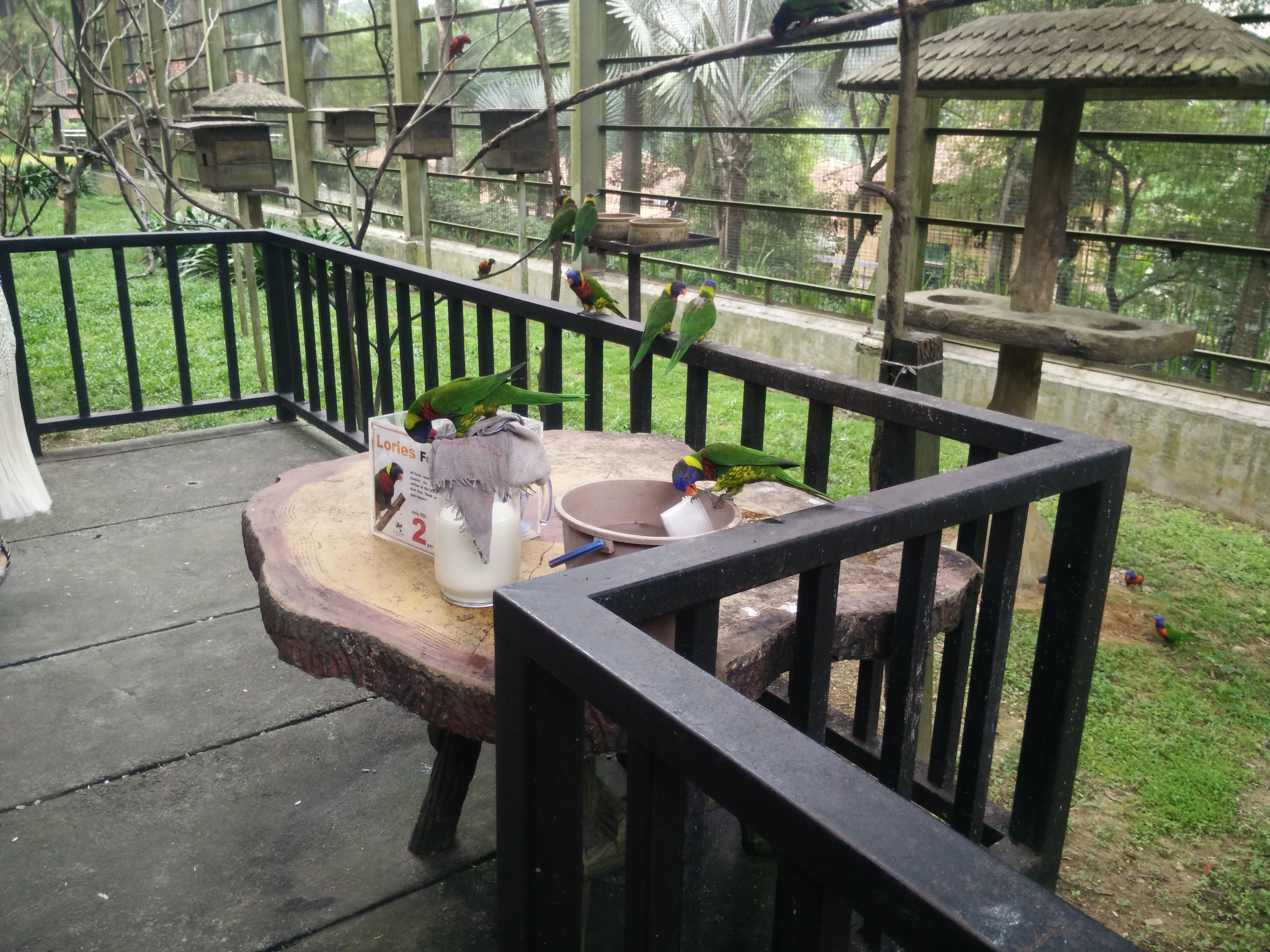
Lorikeets feeding

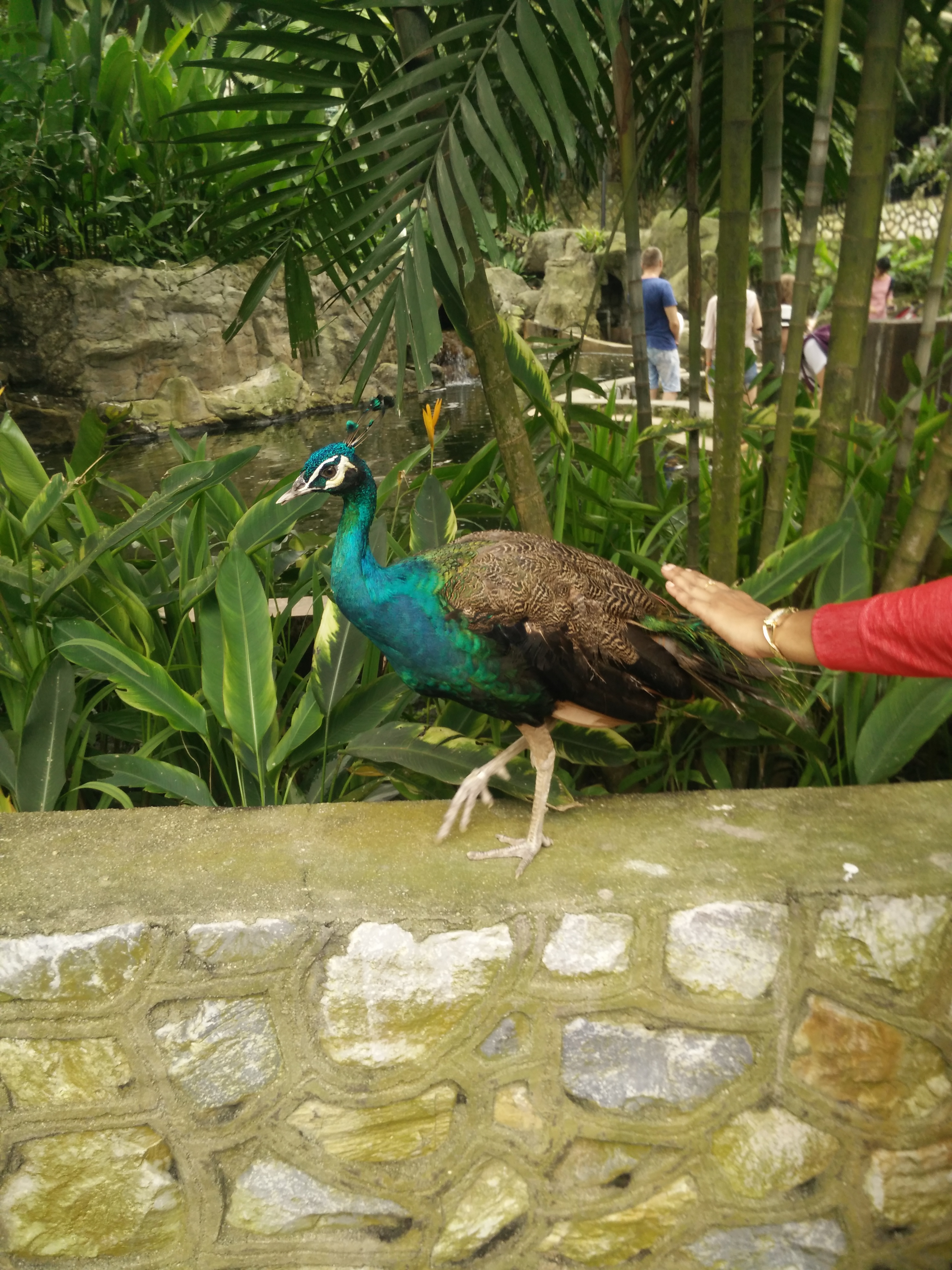
A peacock
