= Five Crows =

Cayuse Indian chief

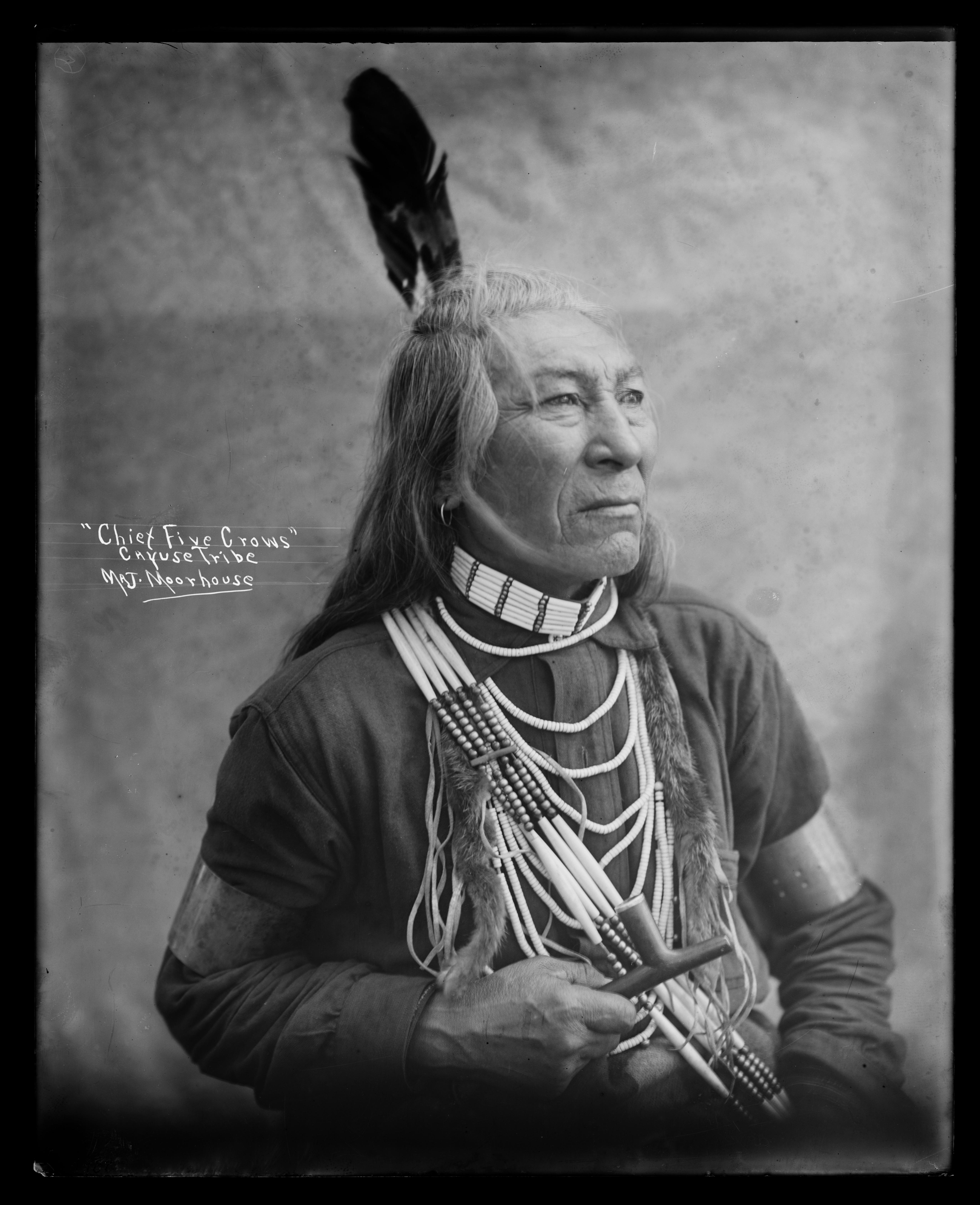
- Chief Five Crows, She-ca-yah, Cayuse Indian, photograph by Lee Moorhouse, c. 1900
- Born: She-ca-yah c. 1832
- Died: 1902; Pendleton, Oregon
- Other names: Hezekiah, Achekaia, or Pahkatos
- Occupations: Chief, diplomat
- Years active: 19th century
- Known for: chief, signatory of the Treaty of Walla Walla

Five Crows (born; She-ca-yah; c. 1832 – 1902), also known as Pahkatos or Hezekiah, was a Cayuse Indian chief and diplomat.

== Early life ==
Five Crows was born circa 1832. He was Cayuse, an Indigenous peoples of the Northwest Plateau, whose territory was in Eastern Washington and Oregon.

== Leadership career ==
His principal rival for the role of Head Chief of the Cayuse was Young Chief (Weatenatemany).

Five Crows was the maternal half-brother of Tuekakas, Old Chief Joseph of the Nez Perce, and the brother-in-law of Peopeomoxmox. The richest of the Cayuse chiefs with over 1,000 horses, he was ruined financially by the Cayuse War that followed the 1847 Whitman Mission killings. Although he was not involved in the killings, he took one of the mission hostages, Lorinda Bewley, as his wife. After he was wounded in the Cayuse War the Nez Perce under Tuekakas nursed him back to health. Five Crows was popular with the Cayuse people and spoke often at the treaty council.

Five Crows was a signatory of the 1855 Treaty with the Wallawalla, Cayuse, etc..

== Death and legacy ==
Five Crows died in Pendleton, Oregon, at age 70 and his body was found near Athena, Oregon.
