= Thomas Ford Hill =

English antiquarian

- Died: 1795
- Occupation: Antiquarian

Thomas Ford Hill (died 1795) was an English antiquarian.

== Biography ==
Hill was the son of a glove manufacturer at Worcester. He was a quaker, and intended for a commercial life. After serving an apprenticeship at Pontefract, he was taken into the house of Messrs. Dawson & Walker in Cornhill, London, but abandoned business for literature and antiquities. In 1780, he made an antiquarian tour through Scotland. In 1784, he visited the continent, residing at Geneva to learn French, and afterwards exploring the mountainous districts of Savoy. His tour was in 1787 extended to Italy, for the purpose of antiquarian studies. He was abroad five years, during which he made the acquaintance of eminent men of learning, and of Cardinal Borgia and Prince Kaunitz. He made two other journeys to the continent in 1791 and 1792, when he travelled through a great part of Germany, and also visited Paris. In 1792, he was elected a fellow of the Society of Antiquaries. In 1794, he went again to Italy, and died on 16 July 1795 at Ariano, worn out by the difficulties he had encountered in his journey to Calabria in that year.

During his tour in Scotland in 1780, Hill collected many Erse songs, some of which appeared, together with a notice of his tour, in the ‘Gentleman's Magazine’ (1782 p. 570, 1783 i. 33, 36, 140, 398, 489, ii. 590), as also did a letter of his on the Ossian controversy (1782, pp. 570–1). The poems were afterwards published separately, under the title of ‘Ancient Erse Songs,’ 1784. The only other work of Hill was ‘Observations on the Politics of France, and their Progress since the Last Summer,’ which was published in 1792. His portrait was painted at Rome in 1787 by Gavin Hamilton (1730–1797) [q. v.]
