= Thomas Heslop Hill =

19th-century British planter

- Born: 20 October 1850
- Died: 8 November 1915 (aged 65)
- Occupation: Planter
- Known for: Pioneer planter of rubber in Malaya at the end of the nineteenth century
- Spouse: Helen Eveleen Mabel Rathbone
- Children: 1 daughter

Thomas Heslop Hill (20 October 1850 – 8 November 1915), a British planter, was the most important coffee-planting pioneer in Malaya, and is also credited with being the first private individual there to plant Hevea rubber.

== Early life ==
Hill was born on 20 October 1850, and was educated at Brighton College, England.

== Ceylon ==
In 1868, he went to Ceylon (now Sri Lanka) to work as an assistant on a coffee plantation at Wanarajah, before moving to Dimbula to work for Lawrence St. George Carey, Ceylon's largest private estate owner, on his Agra Patnas, Aribica coffee estate. Later, he left to work on his own account in partnership with a J. D. Massey, a leading engineer, who purchased three coffee estates in Matale District. He also experimented with Liberian coffee, coconut and cardamoms but was unsuccessful due to the climate being too dry. In the late 1870s, coffee estates in Ceylon were ravaged by leaf disease, and Hill and Massey were ruined.

== Malay Peninsula ==
In 1878, Hill left Ceylon to try his hand at coffee planting on the Malay Peninsula, arriving in Singapore and working with D.P. Brandt and Co., who had a Liberian coffee estate at Pulau Obin, an island situated off Singapore's north-eastern coast. By the late 1870s coffee planters from Ceylon had begun arriving and were beginning to open coffee estates in Malaya.

=== Road and railway construction ===
Whilst in Singapore, Hill became associated with a leading planter, Ambrose Rathbone, and together they decided to establish themselves in partnership as contractors building roads and railways throughout the peninsula. In this they were successful, constructing new, mainly cart roads in Perak, Selangor and Sungei Ujong, from Seremban to Kuala Lumpur, and on to Kuala Kangsar and Port Dickson. These basic roads later became the major roads of the Western States when they were eventually taken over by the Public Works Departments. After they were adopted, Hill's firm continued to maintain many of them under contract with the Government.

Hill's railway building operations were less successful. Around 1886, he undertook the construction of the Sungei Ujong railway in association with A.A. Swan, Engineer, but it was never completed due to unhealthy local conditions and labour disputes.

=== Coffee planter ===
Large-scale coffee planting began to established in Malaya around the end of the 1870s, and Hill has been recognised as the most important coffee-planting pioneer in Malaya. However, it was his road building work which subsequently enabled him to launch his coffee-planting business in 1879. His success in that field was acknowledged by Frank Swettenham, Governor of the Straits Settlements, "Hill was a road maker, and as such helped the beginning of the States enormously".

As a reward for his pioneering work in road building, the Government granted Hill the right to take up free concessions of land in Perak, Selangor and Sungei Ujong, rent free, for the cultivation of coffee. Hill soon established new estates, first in 1879, with Liberian coffee in Sugei Ujong at the Linsum Estate at Rantau, and with Arabica coffee at Bukit Berimbum, which were the first coffee estates to be established in their respective states. 1879 also saw the opening of the first coffee estate in Perak. These were followed by the opening of new Liberian coffee estates by Hill at Weld Hill (1881) and Batu Caves (1884), Selangor.

However, the boom in the coffee industry ended in the 1890s when there was a severe slump in coffee prices, and Hill, who had lost large sums on his unsuccessful railway construction project, was forced to sell his coffee estates to pay his debts to the banks ending his involvement with coffee which had lasted almost thirty years.

=== Cultivation of rubber ===
In the late 1890s, in an effort to restore his fortunes, he began to plant rubber. He had first experimented with cultivation around 1883 when he started 2,000 plants which had been raised at the Government gardens at Kuala Kangsar by Hugh Low from seeds which had been obtained by Henry Whickham from Brazil and propagated at Kew, London. As a result, Hill is credited as the first private individual to plant Hevea rubber on the Malay Peninsula. In 1898, he went into a partnership arrangement with the Government growing rubber at Seremban with convict labour.

=== Malay Civil Service ===
In 1901, whilst his rubber business continued at Seremban, Hill joined the Malay Civil Service in the newly created post of Protector of Labour and Superintendent of Immigrants, at Sungei Ujong, handling Tamil immigration matters, and establishing Tamil agricultural communities in the Federated Malay States. His efforts contributed to the steady increase in the number of Tamil migrants from India who came to work on the rubber estates.

== Death ==
In 1907, Hill retired, selling his rubber business and returned to Hampshire, England where he died on 8 November 1915, aged 65. He was survived by his wife, Helen Eveleen Mabel, sister of his business partner Ambrose Rathbone, whom he married in 1888, and by his only child, a daughter.
