= Yellow Bird (Walla Walla leader) =

19th-century Walla Walla chief from Oregon

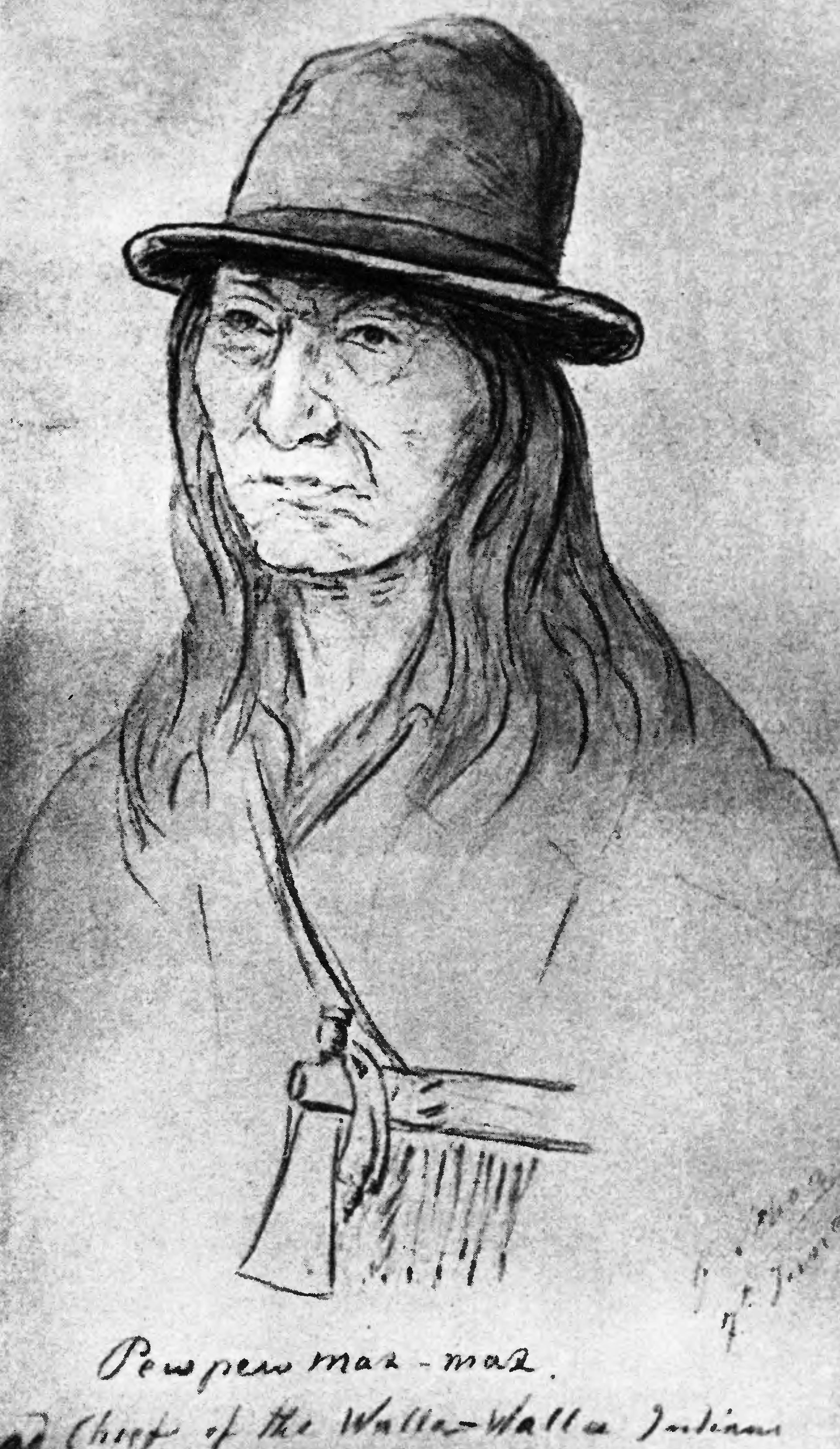
Chief Peo-peo-mox-mox, drawing by Gustav Sohon, 1855

Piupiumaksmaks (alternatively spelled Peo-peo-mox-mox or Peopeomoxmox; c. 1800 – 1855) was head chief of the Walla Walla tribe and son to the preceding chief Tumatapum. His name meant Yellow Bird, but it was often mistranslated as Yellow Serpent by Europeans.

== Accounts ==
While residing at Fort Hall, Jason Lee was greeted by Yellow Bird who presented the missionary with two horses after a test of his medical skills. Yellow Bird later brought his eldest son, Toayahnu, to be educated at the Methodist Mission, who was christened after Elijah Hedding.

Late in 1844, Yellow Bird organised the first Walla Walla expedition, with around 40 Walla Walla, Nez Perce and Cayuse men in addition to their families, which reached New Helvetia to trade for cattle. After capturing horses that had been previously stolen, an altercation arose with one of Sutter's employees, ending with the death of Toayahnu.

Isaac Stevens met Yellow Bird while headed east to chart a path for a Pacific railway in 1853, finding the chief to have a "dignified manner". Yellow Bird then owned "over 2,000 horses, besides many cattle" and maintained a farm outside Fort Nez Percés.

Despite fears by Sacramento settlers of an invasion force of a thousand Walla Wallas in early 1846, Yellow Bird returned with only 40 warriors and declared peaceable intentions. While discussing with Joseph Warren Revere, who was engaged commanding volunteers at New Helvetia, Yellow Bird stated:

I have come from the forests of Oregon with no hostile intentions ... We have come to hunt the beasts of the field, and also to trade our horses for cattle; for my people require cattle, which are not so abundant in Oregon as in California. I have come, too, according to the custom of our tribes, to visit the grave of my poor son, Elijah, who was murdered by a white man. But I have not traveled thus far only to mourn. I demand justice!

The returning party contained those infected with measles, which eventually began to spread across the Columbia Plateau. The outbreak of the disease amongst the Cayuse was a major contributory factor that led to the Whitman Massacre.

Yellow Bird was present during the 1855 treaty council of the Yakima War period. As the war commenced, Yellow Bird had his village near the mouth of the Touchet River. With the advance of an American military unit, he presented himself as a hostage and insisted an end to the conflict. The nearby encamped Walla Wallas began awaiting for the appearance of Head Chief of the Cayuse Five Crows, brother-in-law of Yellow Bird and maternal half-brother of Tuekakas (Old Chief Joseph) of the Nez Perce, before determining to pitch a battle or not. In a meeting with one of his sons the next morning, Yellow Bird advised that a peaceful route be taken. During the first day of the Battle of Walla Walla, on December 7, Yellow Bird was killed by the Oregon Volunteers who were holding him. Soon afterwards he was decapitated and scalped by one of the Volunteers.
