= Fort Walla Walla–Fort Colville Military Road =

The Fort Walla Walla–Fort Colville Military Road was built in June 1859 to connect the Walla Walla area with its fairly easy access to the Columbia River to the mountainous area of the Huckleberry and Selkirk Mountains of current Northeast Washington and the Inland Northwest. Brigadier General William S. Harney, commander of the Department of Oregon, opened up the district north of the Snake River to settlers in 1858 and ordered Brevet Major Pinkney Lugenbeel, 9th Infantry Regiment (United States) to establish a U.S. Army post to restrain the Indians perceived as hostile to the U.S. Army's Northwest Division and to protect miners who traveled to the area after first reports of gold in the area appeared in Western Washington newspapers in July 1855.

It was common practice to use existing Indian trails to develop military roads, and only make necessary improvements for the movement of artillery or supply trains. Brevet Major Lugenbeel followed the long-established Indian trail, then Hudson Bay Company brigade trail from the U.S. Fort Walla Walla area to Hudson Bay Company Fort Colvile, but had to leave the trail at current Orin-Rice Road, two miles south of Colville, where the southernmost land claims of the Hudson Bay Company fort began. Washington Territorial Governor Isaac Stevens and the U.S. Army were ordered by the United States Department of State to honor land ownership claims by the Hudson Bay Company. Lugenbeel's command arrived from Fort Walla Walla on June 20, 1859; Pinkney Lugenbeel was later credited with improving and building up the Military Road.

The start point was Fort Walla Walla, a U.S. Army post established in 1858 with both infantry and cavalry. It closed September 28, 1910. The end point was Fort Colville, a U.S. Army post located three miles north of current Colville, Washington. Fort Colville closed in 1882. The road became the Fort Walla Walla–Fort Colville Military Road.

== History ==
=== Prior to Fort Colville ===
Various Indian tribes used the trail to travel to Kettle Falls for salmon and for trade between people. David Thompson, fur trader, traveled the middle section of the road in 1811. In June 1811, after traveling down the Columbia River from the Kettle Falls area to Astoria in a canoe, he returned in August 1811 up the Columbia and Snake River to where the Palouse River joins the Snake River. This was an established camping place for the Nez Perce people, and later Lyons Ferry, and the Snake River Bridge. River levels were still very high and the currents were rapid, so they took the land route twenty-eight miles northeast through basalt formations and then forty miles through fine light loam with brooks, ponds, grass, and trees to Spokan House. He also traveled the northern section of the road in June and then again in August 1811. Soon after in 1812 or 1813, a fur trader competitor, Pacific Fur Company's Alexander Ross described travelling from Walla Walla to Colville crossing at the Palouse River and arriving at the Spokane River, where the Pacific Fur Company had a fur trading post called Fort Spokane, across from the North West Company's Spokan House. A decade later in 1825, under Hudson Bay Company Governor George Simpson's orders, construction of Fort Colvile began and in April 1826, Spokan House was abandoned.

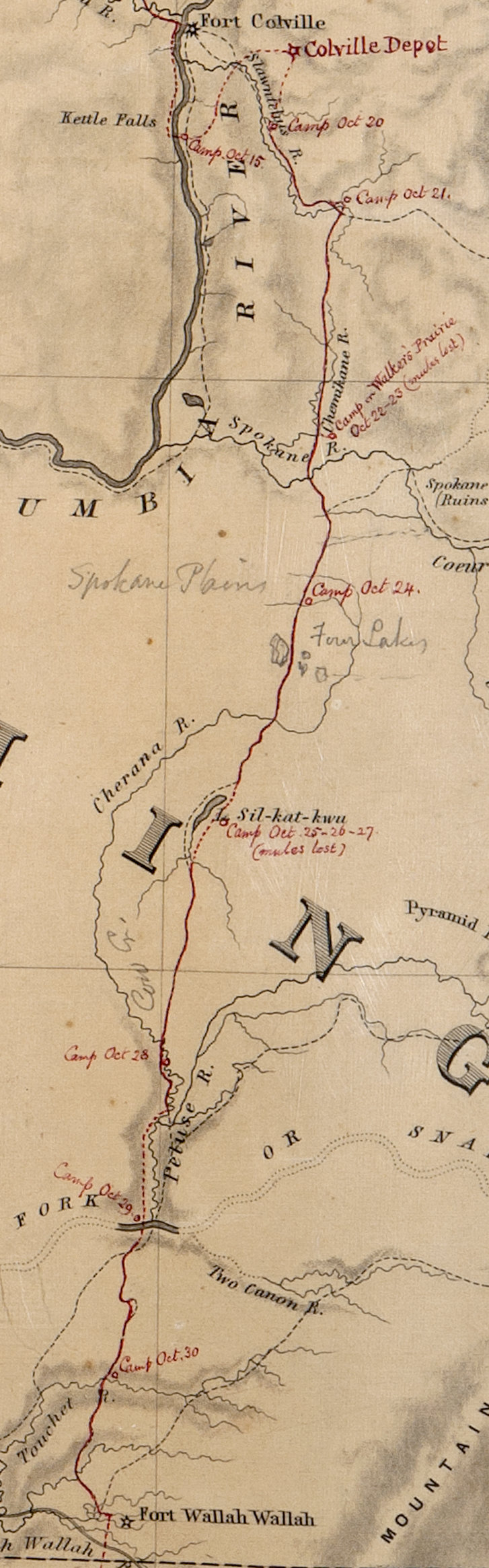
Portion of the Map of the Oregon and Washington Territory, compiled in the Bureau of Topogl. Engrs, chiefly for the military purposes by order of the Secretary of War 1859. Map RG77-CWMF-W52

In May 1835, Reverend Samuel Parker described in detail his travel up the trail from Hudson Bay Company's Fort Walla Walla, as called Fort Nez Percés, to Fort Colvile. He was tasked by the American Board of Commissioners for Foreign Missions to search out locations for Protestant missions. Following in September 1838, Reverend Cushing Eells and Reverend Elkanah Walker, American Protestant missionaries, took the trail from the Whitman Mission to Hudson Bay Company Fort Colvile to choose a location for their mission. Three years prior, Rev. Samuel Parker wrote that the Tshimakain area, right along the trail, would be a good location for a mission. Additionally, Chief Factor Archibald McDonald reportedly recommended Tshimakain, at the site of current Ford, Washington, as a good location for their mission. The pastors returned to the Whitman Mission, and in March 1839, they brought their wives, Mary Richardson Walker and Myra Eells to what became Tshimakain Mission. On the trail north, they took a side trip to the Palouse Falls.

In June 1841, the party of Lieutenant Robert E. Johnson, United States Navy, of the United States Exploring Expedition took several routes through current Eastern Washington. He described the Walla Walla Colville fur trade route taken by Horatio Hale, as the most direct route from north to south in Eastern Washington. In 1847, Paul Kane traveled the trail in the summer of 1847. He visited Palouse Falls July 14 and 15, 1847 and drew the first drawing of the falls. His trip is detailed in "Wanderings of an artist among the Indians of North America : from Canada to Vancouver's Island and Oregon through the Hudson's Bay Company's territory and back again" In 1853, Washington Territorial Governor Isaac Stevens mentioned the Walla Walla Colville trail in this report to U.S. Congress regarding viable railroad routes in the Washington Territory. In 1858, Joseph S. Harris with the U.S. Northwest Boundary Commission described the road between Walla Walla and Colville as an excellent wagon road.

=== As a military road ===
In 1859, Captain John Mullan came to Fort Colville to ascertain improvement to the Fort Walla Walla–Fort Colville Military Road in preparation for building the Mullan Road. In spring 1860, R. V. Peabody, Quartermaster of the U.S. Northwest Boundary Commission, made improvements on the wagon road from Fort Colville to the Spokane River to allow survey teams to travel to the international border along the 49th parallel between the Selkirk Mountains and the Rocky Mountains. On September 28, 1860, First lieutenant August Kautz, 4th Infantry, arrived at Fort Colville with 150 recruits from Fort Benton, Montana via Lake Coeur d'Alene along the Mullan Road. His journal recorded the route from Coeur d'Alene to the fort along the road built by the U.S. Northwest Boundary Commission above the Spokane River and then along the Fort Walla Walla–Fort Colville Military Road. The original Spokane County, and then after merger with Stevens County Board of County Commissioners often referenced the military road particularly regarding repair of bridges and maintenance of the road.

== Traveling the road today ==
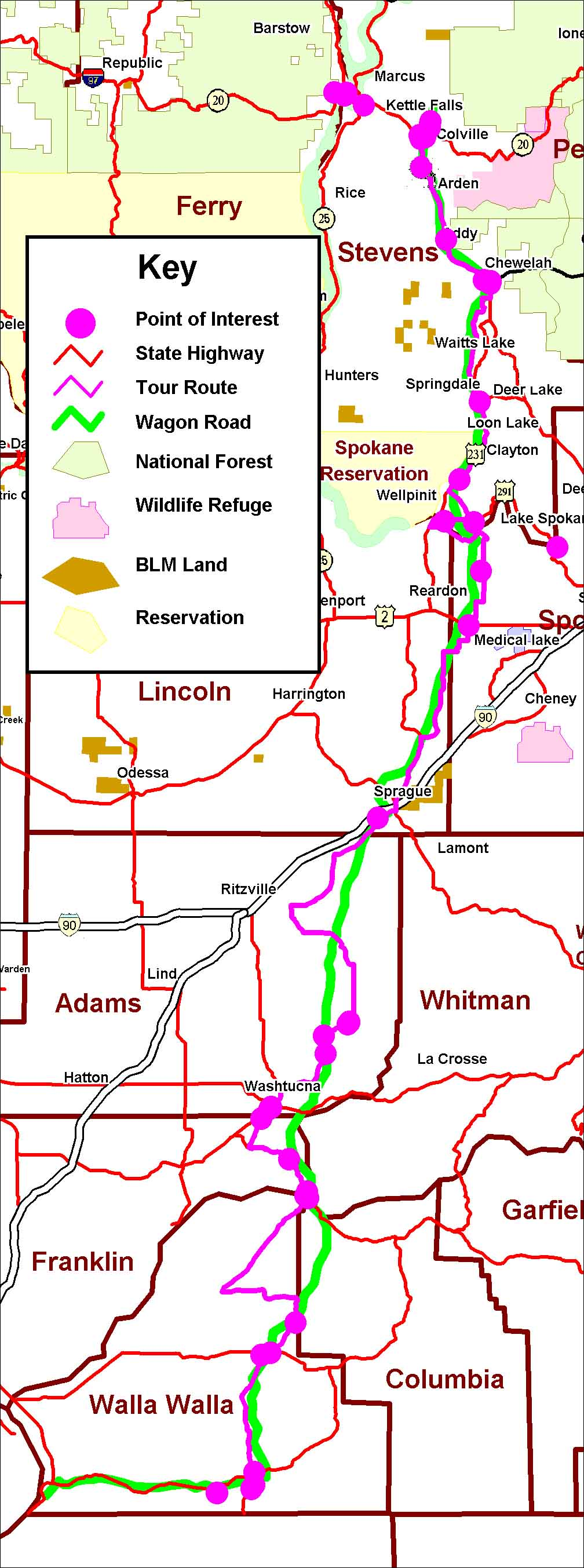
Fort Walla Walla–Fort Colville Military Road Route 1859–82

The historic road and modern driving route begins on Myra Street at Fort Walla Walla, now part of Fort Walla Walla Park. Along Poplar Street, the route passes the Fort Walla Walla Park, heading north on Avery Street, east onto West Rose Street, turning north onto North 13th Avenue and passing through an industrial area for a quarter-mile and under US Route 12 after North 13th Avenue, where the road becomes State Route 125 (SR 125), and passes the Washington State Penitentiary. Dry land farming starts at the penitentiary walls and continues for much of the route, which crosses the Touchet River, turns east towards Prescott on SR 124, and follows Smith Springs Road before turning north.

Because private property impedes drivers from following the military road into current Columbia County, drivers stay in Walla Walla County until just before crossing the Lyons Ferry Bridge, where the Palouse River flows south into the Snake River, and crosses Columbia County in its northwest corner. The road then crosses the Snake River at the Josso High Bridge on SR 261 and passes by Lyons Ferry Park in Franklin County. Continuing on SR 261 and turning north at Nunamaker Road, the route eventually reconnects with SR 261, where it becomes SR 260, and proceeds towards Washtucna, Adams County.

Two miles north of Washtucna, the route turns onto Benge-Washtucna Road and continues for 14 miles to Benge. The town has a historical marker for the Mullan Road and the Stone Corral, as well as a trailhead for the Columbia Plateau Trail. On the east side of Sprague Lake upon entering Lincoln County, Danekas Road then turns into Max Harder Road. At Sprague, the road turns north onto SR 23, which continues onto SR 231. After nine miles, the route then turns onto Waukon Road, followed by another turn to Hallett Road.

The road passes through western Spokane County, parallel to SR 231, along several county roads. A monument erected by the Eastern Washington Historical Society to the "Explorers Fur Traders Missionaries Soldiers and Pioneers who made an Indian Trail The Colville Walla Walla Road" is on U.S. Route 2. Nearby is the site of Camp Washington, where on October 29, 1853, Washington Territorial Governor Isaac Stevens met both his eastern and western divisions of the Northern Pacific Railroad Exploration and Survey exploring routes from the Rockies to the coast of the Washington territory for railway development. Wagons on the military road descended into Curby Canyon to initially ford the Spokane River and later to cross on LaPray Bridge into Stevens County. The ferry was submerged under Long Lake in 1915.

SR 231 goes west of Long Lake Dam, and reconnects with the military road near the town of Ford. The highway passes the historic Tshimakain Mission and travels through Springdale, Washington, where the military road moved to the west side of the Colville River Valley on Long Prairie Road. The 1859 route of Archibald Campbell and the U.S. Northwest Boundary Commission and field notes from Lieutenant August Kautz indicated that the route crossed northeast to Fool's Prairie, now called Chewelah, crossing the Colville River near Indian Ridge. Leaving Chewelah to the north, the road passed the St. Francis Regis Mission, a Catholic mission from 1845 to 1869. The military road mostly followed current U.S. Route 395, passing near Addy. About two miles south of what is now Colville, the military road turned northeast from the established trail to avoid Hudson Bay Company lands. As this portion of the road no longer exists and resumes on Aladdin Road, where the military road passed east of the original site of the Immaculate Conception Catholic Church and the Calvary cemetery.
