= Ruth McKee =

Ruth McKee may refer to:

- Ruth E. McKee, writer and United States consul at Tokyo
- Ruth Karr McKee, member of the Board of Regents, University of Washington
