= Myron Eells =

American missionary and ethonologist

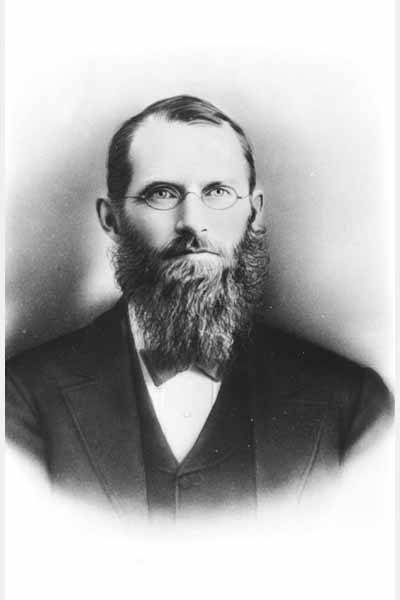
- Born: October 7, 1843; Tshimakain Mission, Oregon Country
- Died: January 4, 1907 (aged 63); Skokomish Reservation, Washington, US
- Occupations: Congregational Missionary, Ethnologist, Collector
- Known for: Early scholarship on the Indigenous peoples of the Pacific Northwest

Myron Eells (October 7, 1843 – January 4, 1907) was an American Congregational missionary, collector, and scholar of the Indigenous people of the Pacific Northwest. During his lifetime, he was a leading authority on Native American culture and languages in the Pacific Northwest. He is best known for his monograph The Indians of Puget Sound and his voluminous work on Pacific Northwest languages, including Twana and Chinook Jargon, as well as his extensive collection of Indigenous cultural artifacts which were donated to Whitman College, an institution founded by his father, Cushing Eells.

== Biography ==
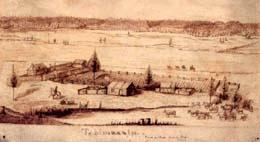
Tshimakain Mission, 1843

=== Early life and education ===
Myron Eells was born in 1843 to Cushing Eells and Myra Eells (née Fairbanks) at the Tshimakain Mission in Oregon Country near the future site of Ford, Washington. His parents had gone west in 1838 as missionaries to join the Marcus Whitman and Henry Spalding party. They took a post at the new Tshimakain Mission with the Elkanah Walker family among the Spokane people, north of the Whitman Mission located at at Waiilatpu, near present-day Walla Walla. Whitman, a doctor, visited Tshimakain to help with Eells' birth, as well as that of his older brother Edwin. In the wake of the Whitman Massacre in 1847, the Eells family relocated to the Willamette Valley, settling in Forest Grove. His father became a teacher at during this time. In 1859, his father founded Whitman College in honor of his fellow missionaries killed in the Whitman Massacre.

Eells enrolled at Pacific University in Forest Grove, attending from 1861 to 1866. In the course of his studies at Pacific, his family moved back to Washington Territory, settling at Waiilatpu, the site of the Whitman Massacre that had driven them from the Tshimakain Mission 14 years earlier. From 1866 to 1868, he worked on his father's farm near Walla Walla, contributing to the local newspaper in his spare time. At Pacific University, he was told by the school's president that he needed to "go East" in order to "become an American." He attended the Theological Institute of Connecticut in Hartford, his father's alma mater, from 1868 to 1871. He was ordained as a Congregational Minister on June 15, 1871.

=== Missionary work ===
Upon graduating with a degree in theology, he returned to the Pacific Northwest. He became the leader of a Congregational Church in Boise, Idaho, a post he held from 1871 to 1874. He married Sarah M. Crosby of Boise on January 18, 1874, with whom he would go on to have five sons.

In 1874, he visited his brother Edwin Eells, who was employed as an Indian agent at the Skokomish Reservation on the southern arm of Hood Canal, a position he held from 1871 to 1895. Seeking to remain with his family, he asked for and received an official appointment from the American Missionary Association to serve as a missionary on the reservation that same year. Shortly after taking his post in Washington Territory, he was invited to serve as a minister at a church at The Dalles, Oregon, for a significantly higher annual wage, but he chose to stay at the Skokomish Reservation.

He learned Chinook Jargon, a regional trade language, immediately upon arriving at Puget Sound after learning that each of the local languages would only allow him to communicate with one group of people at a time. Having been dissuaded from studying Twana (Skokomish) and Lushootseed, he instead preached in Chinook Jargon and employed translators for those who only spoke those languages.

He was the only Christian minister within 30 miles of the reservation in 1876. His missionary duties required extensive travel throughout western Washington, with preaching duties taking him to Shelton, Belfair, Clallam Bay, the Upper Skokomish, and even Puyallup when the Skokomish traveled there to pick hops. On one occasion, illustrating the extent of his relationship with local Indigenous people, a group of Skokomish men requested that Eells accompany them on a canoe trip to a potlatch on Dungeness Spit in order to prevent them from consuming alcohol, to which he reluctantly agreed.

In the course of his missionary work, he built one of the smallest steam crafts on Puget Sound to commute across Hood Canal, called the Myra after his late mother, but it sank a few months after launch.

==== Shaker controversy ====
In the early 1880s at Mud Bay, near Olympia, the Indian Shaker Church was established by a Squaxin man named John Slocum. The syncretic religion included elements of Native American Religions, Protestantism, and Catholicism. It spread quickly on southern reaches of Puget Sound and Hood Canal, including the Skokomish Valley. Eells and his brother Edwin, a U.S. Indian agent, were involved in the early documentation and attempted suppression of the religious movement, at the time called the "Half-Catholic Movement." The extent of the role the Eells brothers played in the creation and spread of the Shaker Church has been the subject of research by scholars, including G.P. Castile, who suggested that its formation was contingent on Myron Eells' particular style of missionary work and that its spread was accelerated by Edwin Eells' persistent attempts at suppression. Castile calls Myron Eells the "major firsthand source" on the rise of the Shaker church. Despite the Eells brothers' belief that the Shaker movement would not last, the religion is still practiced in the Northwest today.

=== Scholarship ===
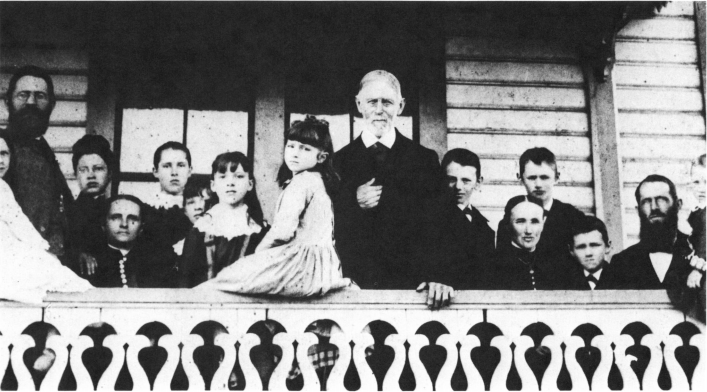
Eells family portrait in Puyallup (1888) with Myron Eells at far right

Upon his assignment to the Skokomish Reservation, Eells began to study the local languages and cultures, taking after his father's efforts to do the same in Eastern Washington. His first experience with this research came when he and his brother Edwin responded to a survey on Indigenous groups for the 1876 Centennial Exposition in Philadelphia. By 1877, just 3 years after his first arrival in Mason County, he published "The Twana Indians of the Skokomish Reservation in Washington Territory" in the United States Geological and Geographic Survey. In 1879, the American Antiquarian Society published Eells' influential essay, "Indian Music," which included a study of the Klallam tribe.

Alongside the Salishan languages of southern Puget Sound, including Twana and Chehalis, Eells was one of the leading early compilers and scholars of Chinook Jargon, publishing a dictionary and a collection of hymns he translated into the language in 1878.

Eells acquired a national reputation as a scholar and collector by the 1880s. He was affiliated with many institutions, despite residing in a remote, sparsely populated area. He was a member of the American Anthropological Association, the Victoria Institute, the International Congress of Americanists, and both the Washington and Oregon Historical Societies, among others. He served as a trustee for Whitman College and Pacific University, giving the commencement address at the former on at least one occasion. He was a frequent contributor to publications of the Smithsonian Institution. His scholarly output was prolific, with hundreds of articles, pamphlets, and books to his name. Whitman College honored him in 1890 with an honorary Doctor of Divinity degree. He was offered the presidency of the college in 1891, but he declined the post at his doctor's urging.

In 1892 he became one of several Northwestern ethnologists employed by anthropologist Franz Boas as artifact collectors for the federal government of the United States. That same year, he was appointed as the superintendent of the Department of Ethnology for the Washington delegation to the 1893 World’s Columbian Exposition in Chicago. The artifacts he acquired on commission for the governments of Washington and the United States are housed between the Field Museum in Chicago, the Burke Museum in Seattle, and the National Museum of Natural History in Washington, DC.

Eells was also influential in the study of Indigenous religion and mythology in the Pacific Northwest, publishing multiple comparative studies of Salish stories and observing their relationship with Christianity. Eells' documentation of the origins and spread of the Indian Shaker Church, as well as that of his brother Edwin in his role as an Indian agent, has been significant in the study of that religious movement.

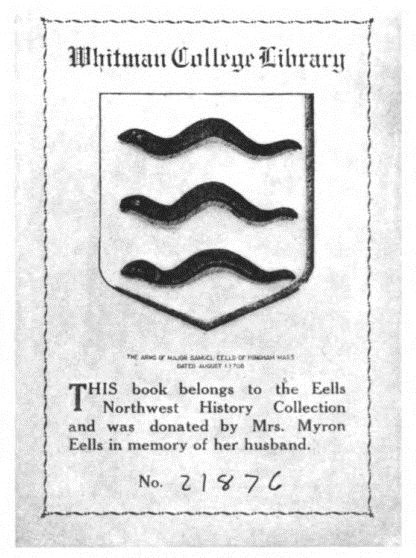
Myron Eells Collection bookplate from the Whitman College Library

==== Evaluation of his work ====
Recent scholarship has reconsidered the work of Myron Eells, suggesting that his role as a missionary influenced his work as an ethnologist and linguist. He was untrained in the nascent disciplines of anthropology and linguistics, and he has been categorized as a salvage ethnographer, who worked to preserve Indigenous culture while simultaneously participating in missionary efforts to assimilate Indigenous people into the settlers' culture. His work on Twana has been regarded as propagating the "difficult language belief," a bias that certain languages are more or less difficult than others, often bound up with value judgements on the language's worth. As his extensive diaries and notebooks have been analyzed, evidence of censorship has been found in his coverage of poor conduct by missionaries. This did not extend as far as destroying sources or removing them from his collection, instead leaving them out of copied manuscripts selectively in order to portray missionaries in a better light.

Despite his biases and lack of training, his body of work has been defended as invaluable to the study of Pacific Northwest languages and Indigenous cultures, providing valuable linguistic data and a view of life on Puget Sound in the 19th century not found in other contemporary sources.

=== Death and legacy ===
Eells continued his work until his death, recording that in the year 1905 that he had "written 1,204 letters and postals, including 57 newspaper articles" and "traveled about 5,838 miles ... horseback, 2,195; afoot 296; wagon and buggy 493; rowboat 335; steamer 979; railroad 1,540." As the settler population grew, his missionary work extended to local schools as well as the reservations.

He died on January 4, 1907, at the age of 63 on the Skokomish Reservation, near Union, Washington. His wife served as the benefactor for his collection. He is buried at Union Pioneer Cemetery. Eells Hill Road in Mason County bears his name, as did the former "Eells Precinct" census tract in the Skokomish Valley.

== Eells' collection ==
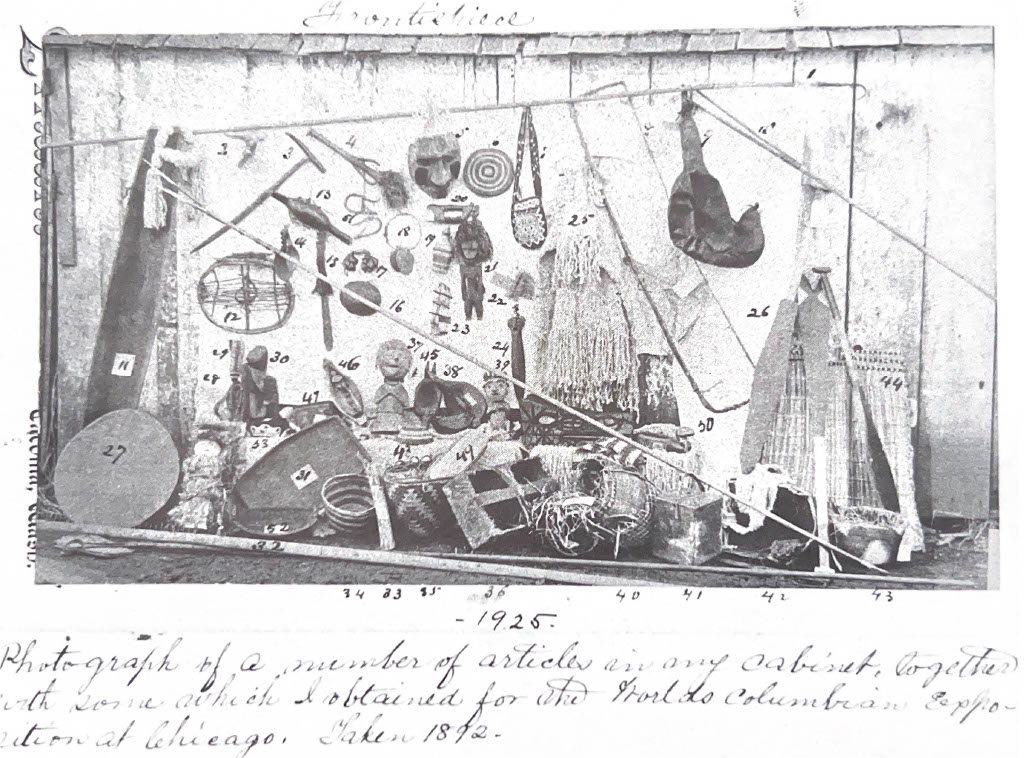
One of Eells' "Indian Cabinets"

Alongside his scholarship, Eells is known today for both the content and manner of his collections. His approach to collecting and his meticulous record-keeping of his acquisitions has drawn particular attention from academics in the field of library and information science in the 21st century.

Eells began his library and collection in 1868, while living on his family farm in Walla Walla, keeping a meticulous catalog of his titles and information regarding their accessions. When he moved to the Skokomish Reservation, he began to acquire newspaper clippings and ephemera in addition to books, and started a number of "Indian cabinets," or collections of Indigenous cultural artifacts, from the Coast Salish people with whom he worked. The proliferation of his collection and library beyond the scope of an ordinary clergyman's library was made necessary by his otherwise complete isolation from academic and institutional resources. By 1896, the extent of his library had gained notoriety in Washington and the Seattle Post-Intelligencer published a feature called "Myron Eells Library: A Valuable Collection Bearing on the History of This State."

When Whitman College admitted its first students in 1882, Eells began to send his books back to help expand the minute library of the new institution. His contributions from 1882 to his death in 1907, including the posthumous donations by his wife, formed the "nuclei" of the Whitman College library.

Today, the entirety of Eells' collection of more than 1,600 Native American artifacts and his 1,800-volume library of historical manuscripts are on display or archived at Whitman College's Myron Eells Library of Northwest History, the Whitman College Northwest Manuscripts Collection, the Whitman College Archives, and the Maxey Museum.

== Selected publications ==
During his lifetime, Eells published hundreds of articles in newspapers and magazines in addition to at least 50 pamphlets and 4 books. He also left behind a large number of unpublished manuscripts which were archived at Whitman College following his death in 1907. He was unable to publish his six-manuscript monograph The Indians of Puget Sound in its entirety during his lifetime, but in 1985 it was edited and published by George Pierre Castile of Whitman College.

- Hymns in the Chinook Jargon Language (1878)
- Indian Music (1879)
- History of Indian Missions of the Pacific Coast Oregon, Washington, and Idaho (1882)
- Ten Years of Missionary Work Among the Indians (1886)
- The Hand of God in the History of the Pacific Coast (1888)
- The Chinook Jargon (1893)
- Father Eells, or the Results of Fifty-five Years of Missionary Labors in Oregon and Washington (1894)
- The Indians of Puget Sound: The Notebooks of Myron Eells (1985, ed. George Pierre Castile)
