= Tshimakain Mission =

Congregationalist mission in Washington, U.S.

Coordinates: 47°54′50″N 117°47′58″W

The Tshimakain Mission was a Congregationalist mission to the Spokane people of Oregon Country established in 1838 on Chamokane Creek, a tributary of the Spokane River, near the future site of Ford, Washington.

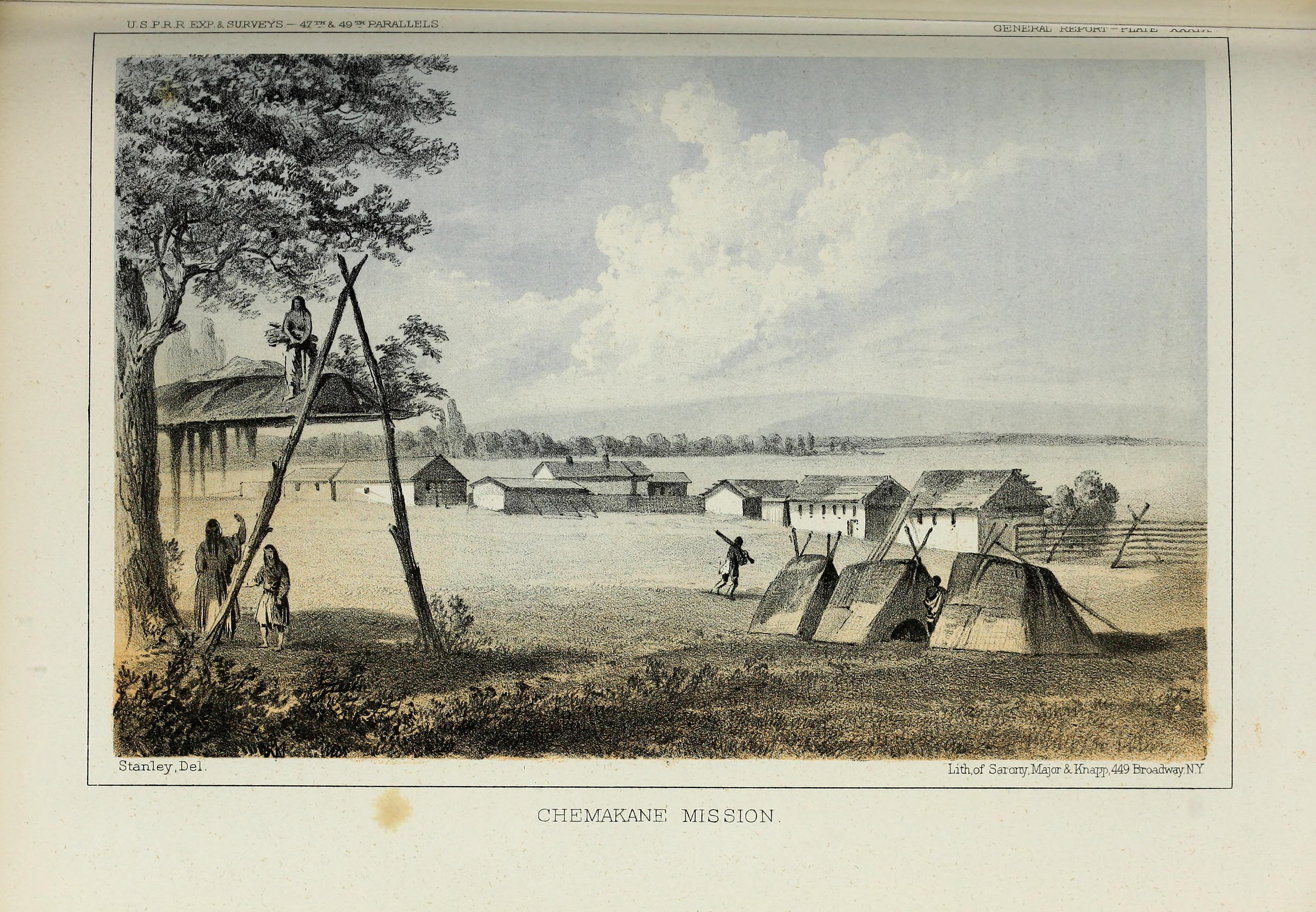
Tshimakain Mission in 1853, after its evacuation

It was established and run by Congregationalist missionaries Cushing Eells, Myra Eells, Elkanah Walker, and Mary Richardson Walker under the auspices of the American Board of Commissioners for Foreign Missions. The mission lasted for nine years before tensions arising from the 1847 Whitman Massacre and the subsequent Cayuse War led to the intervention of the United States government and the military evacuation of the missionaries to the Willamette Valley in 1848. The work of the mission was unsuccessful.

== Background ==
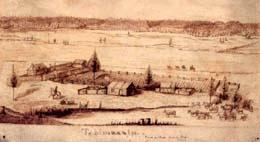
Tshimakain Mission, 1843

Samuel Parker, a Presbyterian missionary and associate of Marcus Whitman, was the first to note the possibility of a mission to the Spokane people. He visited the area in 1836, preaching near the present-day site of Spokane, Washington with the assistance of Spokane Garry, who had studied English at the Red River Colony. Upon returning to the United States in 1837, he encouraged missionary work with the Spokane, in particular near Fort Colvile and Fort Walla Walla of the Hudson's Bay Company. Spokane Garry and other members of the Spokane tribe had requested missionaries in 1837, further establishing the Fort Colvile area as a potential site for a mission.

Cushing Eells and Elkanah Walker had been offered missionary roles in Africa by the American Board of Commissioners for Foreign Missions, but tensions there led the Board to send them to Oregon Country instead. On April 23, 1838, after traveling to Independence, Missouri from New England, the Eells, Walkers, and a party of other missionaries departed west for Oregon Country with a Hudson's Bay Company fur trader caravan bound for the Rocky Mountain Rendezvous. On August 29, 1838, the party arrived at Waiilatpu, the site of the Whitman Mission, which had been established by Marcus and Narcissa Whitman two years earlier.

== Founding and early years ==
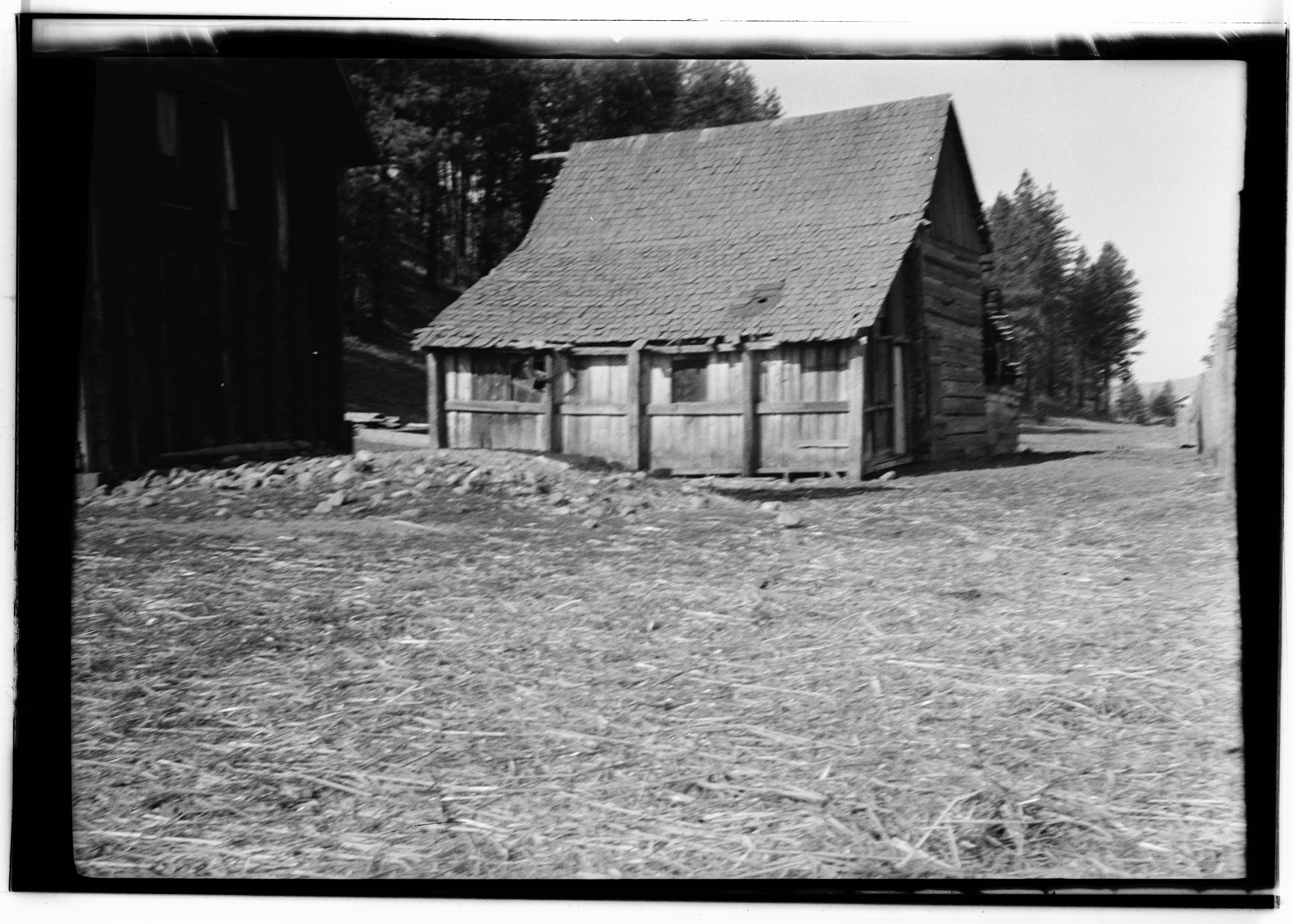
One of the original mission structures

The mission site was selected in 1838 when Fort Colvile Chief Factor Archibald McDonald recommended it to the Eells and Walker families on their first visit to the area. The prairie on Chamokane Creek, around 70 miles (110 km) south of Fort Colvile, was home to a village of around 250 Spokane led by Chief Big Head, whose name Charles Wilkes recorded as Silimxnotylmilakabok in his Narrative of the United States Exploring Expedition. The band led by Chief Big Head had extensive contact with European settlers by 1838, particularly the Hudson's Bay Company, with the chief's son having attended school at the Red River Colony. Chief Big Head, known to the missionaries as Old Chief, acted as an escort for the Eells and Walker families. The name Tshimakain, an older spelling of the creek's name, means "place of a spring" in the Salish–Spokane–Kalispel language. On September 16, 1838, during their visit to select a mission site and begin construction, Cushing Eells conducted the first Protestant service in Stevens County on Fool's Prairie, near what is now the city of Chewelah. The Eells and Walker families went south to spend the winter at Waiilatpu before returning north in 1839 to complete construction of the mission.

In the fall of 1839, the missionaries started a school for the local Indigenous people with thirty students initially, rising to eighty over the winter. On January 11, 1841, the Eells house burned down. Local Spokane responded quickly to assist. When the Chief Factor McDonald heard about the fire, he dispatched four men to help repair it.

In 1842, Elkanah Walker, with support from Cushing Eells, printed the Spokane Primer, a language primer on the Interior Salish language of the Spokane. This was the first book written in Washington. The Eells children, Edwin and Myron Eells, were born at the mission in the early 1840s. The winter of 1846-47 was the most severe in the memory of the oldest Natives. Both the Spokane and the missionaries lost many domestic animals.

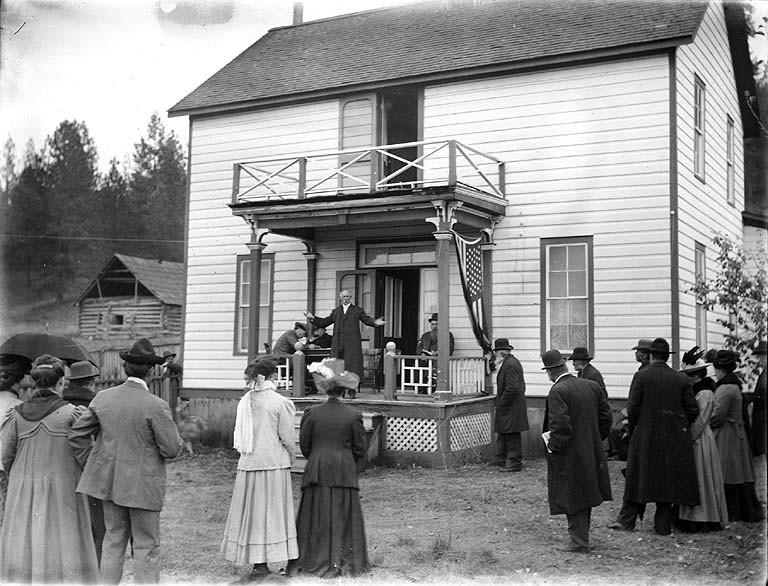
Memorial dedication in 1908 with the Eells house and other original structures visible

== Whitman massacre and abandonment ==
On November 29, 1847, several Cayuse killed thirteen members of the Whitman Mission at Waiilaptu in what became known as the Whitman massacre. Cushing Eells and Elkanah Walker were supposed to be at the Whitman Mission during the time of the massacre, but Walker took ill, and Eells did not want to leave the families without support. As members of the newly formed Oregon Rifles corps chased the Cayuse responsible for the killings, it brought them closer to the Tshimakain Mission. One of the Cayuse involved in the massacre had family at Fool's Prairie, now Chewelah, to the north of the Tshimakain Mission. The Chief Factor John Lee Lewes of the Hudson's Bay Company at Fort Colvile offered to house the missionaries up at the fort for their safety. They delayed going to the fort as the Spokane had wanted them to stay at Tshimakain with their provide support, but as the pursuit of the Cayuse involved in the massacre stretched out, they sought the safety of the fort.

Colonel Henry A. G. Lee, Oregon Volunteers, called for volunteers to bring the Tshimakain missionaries to the Willamette Valley and safety. Major Joseph Magone and 60 volunteers evacuated the Eells and Walker families under military escort to Oregon City in the Willamette Valley on June 22, 1848.

During their time with the Spokane, the missionaries never had a convert to their faith. Myra Eells wrote in 1847, "We have been here nine years and have not yet been permitted to hear the cries of one penitent or the songs of one redeemed soul."

== Eells' return to Tshimakain ==
In July 1874, Eells came back to the area, the only one of the four missionaries to do so. Eells conducted two services for the natives and two more for the white settlers at Chewelah after consulting with John A. Simms, Indian agent for the area who was located at Chewelah. In 1859, the Fort Walla Walla–Fort Colville Military Road, the main land route from Walla Walla to Colville, had been constructed alongside the old site of the mission, facilitating travel in the area.

In 1892, a church was erected at Chewelah. Though Eells was living west of the Cascade Mountains, he came and offered prayer in the new church some 54 years to the day after he first camped on the site. He gifted a bell to this church.

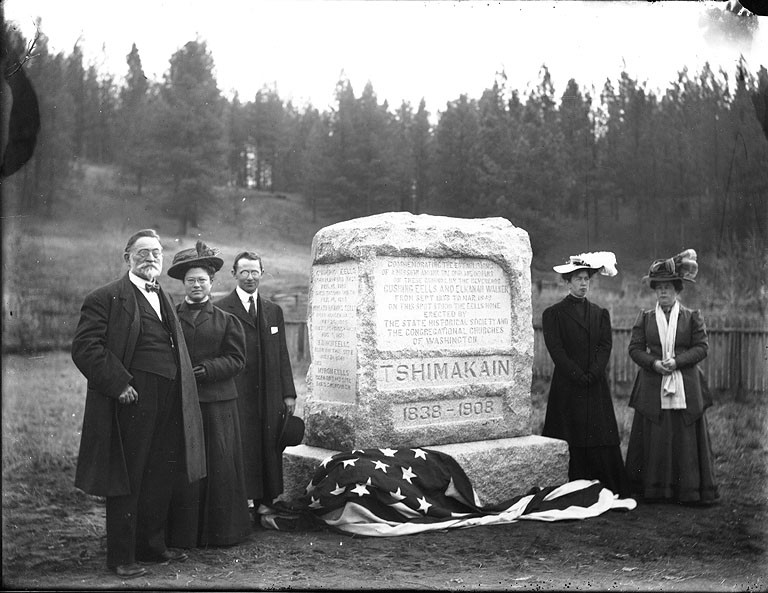
Memorial dedication in 1908

== Legacy ==
The area outside of the community of Ford where the mission was located is now called Walker's Prairie in honor of Elkanah and Mary Walker. In 1908, a historical monument was erected and dedicated on the former site of the Eells house at Tshimakain Mission. In 1938, following the construction of new buildings on the property, it was relocated to its present location.

== Notables who visited the mission ==
- Dr. Marcus Whitman came several times to assist Mary Walker and Myra Eells with the births of their children, including Edwin and Myron Eells
- Henry H. Spalding, fellow missionary, visited several times.
- Francis Ermatinger was part of the HBC escort to the Rocky Mountain Rendezvous on the trip west and visited in January 1839.
- Lt. Robert E. Johnson and Horatio Hale, members of the United States Exploring Expedition, took a direct route from Walla Walla to the mission, arriving September 1841.
- Father Pierre-Jean De Smet visited in April 1842.
- Karl (Charles) A. Geyer, German botanist, visited on December 25, 1844, stayed until August 22, 1845.
- Paul Kane, famous for his paintings of Native peoples, visited in September 1847.
