= Fort Colvile =

- Fur Trade Outpost
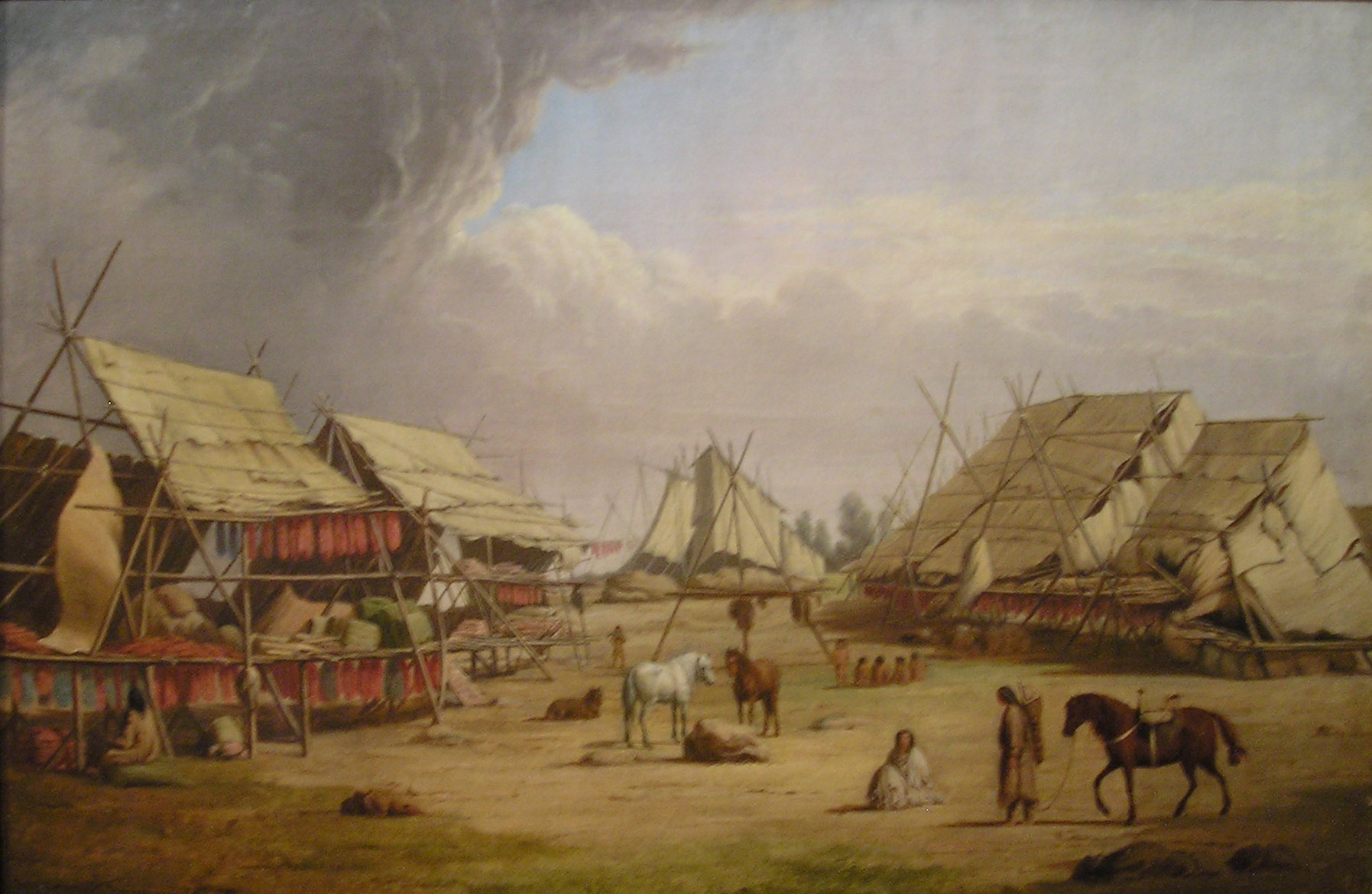
- Indian camp at Fort Colvile by Paul Kane

- Location within Washington (state)
- Coordinates: 48°37′42″N 118°5′31″W
- Country: United States
- State: Washington
- Place: Kettle Falls
- Constructed: 1825
- Founder: Hudson's Bay Company
- Abandoned: 1871

The trade center Fort Colvile (also Fort Colville) was built by the Hudson's Bay Company (HBC) at Kettle Falls on the Columbia River in 1825 and operated in the Columbia fur district of the company. Named for Andrew Colvile, a London governor of the HBC, the fort was a few miles west of the present site of Kettle Falls, now flooded by the Grand Coulee Dam. A marker for the fort is a few miles north of Colville, Washington. It was an important stop on the York Factory Express trade route to London via the Hudson Bay. The HBC for some time considered Fort Colvile second in importance only to Fort Vancouver, near the mouth of the Columbia, until the foundation of Fort Victoria.

Under the Treaty of 1818, the Great Britain and the United States of America both claimed rights to the Oregon Country. The contentious Oregon dispute for ownership of the land was ended by the Oregon Treaty in 1846. The boundary between British North America and the United States was extended to the Pacific Ocean on the 49th Parallel, with all of Vancouver Island considered British. During the gold rushes of the 1850s and 1860s, Fort Colvile in 1860 especially became an important centre for mining activity and supplies. Abandoned in June 1871, some buildings stood until they burned July 6, 1910.

The construction of Grand Coulee Dam resulted in the site being flooded in 1940, as was Kettle Falls. When Lake Roosevelt was drawn down for construction of Grand Coulee Dam's Powerhouse #3 in the late 1960s and early 1970, Fort Colvile and Kettle Falls were revealed. After archaeological work was performed by Washington State University and the University of Idaho, the Fort Colvile site was again inundated by Lake Roosevelt. In 1974, Fort Colvile was added to the National Register of Historic Places for its historic significance.

== Establishment ==
It replaced Spokane House as a regional trading center, due to the latter being deemed to be too far from the Columbia River. Governor George Simpson considered the disuse of Spokane House to likely offend Spokane elders, and ordered for a dispersement of gifts among them. The removal of the company property at Spokane House was moved to Fort Colvile in March 1826. Simpson also gave instructions to Chief Factor John McLoughlin for "every possible exertion be used to be lay up an abundant stock of Fish and other provisions" due to limited capacity to send freight from Fort Vancouver. Additionally Simpson stated that a station on Kettle Falls would be "a more desirable situation in regard to Farming, fish, provisions generally as also in respect to Trade..." than the Spokane House.

== Operations ==
During the 1820s, yearly purchases of furs rarely exceeded 20 blankets being sold. Increased amounts of animal hides were gathered by Fort Colvile started with the "Flat Head brigade," which joined the Bitterroot Salish on their annual migrations past the Rocky Mountains. A skirmish in 1829 between the Bitterroot Salish and inhabitants of Columbia Lake caused fears among HBC employees about the defenseless state of Fort Colvile Additional employees were sent to erect a palisade and establish the mill during the Winter.

The staff number for Fort Colvile fluctuated with the seasons. Operations commencing in the Spring required upwards of 30 employees during the 1830s. Usually only five men were stationed there throughout Winter, and if the number was above that, McLoughlin would reassign the extra staff. Spokane Garry was considered a prospective employee at the Fort until McLoughlin rejected the proposition. Alex McLeod, born at the fort in 1854 recalled that "The trading post proper was a square enclosure. The store and warehouses were on the north side, and Chief Trader McDonald's house was on the east side. The married employees, like my father, lived outside the enclosed post yard on the south and west sides."

The American Board of Commissioners for Foreign Missions Missionaries established Tshimakain Mission in 1838. The missionary families of Elkanah Walker and Cushing Eells developed ties with Fort Colvile officers and wives, then the closest white settlement in the area. After the Whitman Massacre, the missionaries fled their station for the protection of the HBC trading post.

Agricultural operations at Fort Colvile were prominent, eventually supplying other interior posts with wheat, peas, flint corn, and potatoes. The prairie that the station was on was deemed an "island of fertility" by visiting artist Paul Kane. At its foundation, 24 bushels of potatoes were sown, but over half was eaten by rodents. The farm was able to produce enough crops to feed its staff and Fort Nez Perces in 1830. The harvest wasn't large enough to support the brigade of fur trappers headed to the New Caledonia district, requiring shipments from Fort Vancouver. 20 Native and White men labored on the farms in 1838, about two-thirds of the total number of men kept at trade post. The potato harvests had increased greatly in size compared to the initial sowing, in 1838, it was over 7,000 bushels. Charles Wilkes of the United States Exploring Expedition found that farming was the primary focus of the establishment "for the whole of the northern posts depend upon Colville for supplies of provisions." Salmon was easily procured when the seasonal runs commenced. One pioneer recalled that Kettle Falls men would "put large wicker baskets below the falls and raised them up three times a day, always filled with fish."

Fort Colvile was the center for construction of Columbia boats, the wooden-planked canoe-like watercraft used to convey freight and passengers on the Columbia River in the fur trade era.

== Later years ==
After the signing of the Oregon Treaty of 1846, Fort Colvile was south of the 49th parallel and therefore within American claimed land. The Hudson's Bay Company founded Fort Shepherd, British Columbia, just north of the new boundary, as a surrogate location secure on British territory. They continued some operations at Fort Colvile for a few years longer. While traveling through in 1853, Washington Territorial Governor Isaac Stevens described Fort Colvile as:

The buildings consist of a dwelling house, three or four store-houses, and some smaller buildings, used as blacksmith shops, etc., all of one story and constructed of squared logs. The whole was once surrounded by a stockade, forming a square of about 70 yards on each side. This has been removed, except on the north side, where it encloses a narrow yard containing offices. One bastion remains. About 30 yards in the rear of this square are the cattle yards, hay sheds, etc., enclosing a space of 40 by 60 yards, roughly fenced in, and the sheds covered with bark. On the left of the front are seven huts, occupied by the lower employes [sic] of the company. They are of rude construction, and much decayed. On the right of the square, in the rear, at a distance of a few hundred yards, are three more buildings, used for storing produce.

In 1859 the Palliser Expedition reunited in Fort Colvile and proceeded down the Columbia River, after having explored much of what is now western Canada, from the Great Lakes to Lake Okanagan. The mill maintained at the fort was sold in 1865. Early settlers surrounding Colvile were often French-Canadians formerly in the employ of the HBC. At social occasions held at their former station, "would drink whisky [sic] and brandy and sing old songs or tell tales of hunting experiences." Such outings were found to be composed of "the lighthearted trapper with his gaudy moccasins and leggings, through all shades of colour to the dusky hue of the Indians".

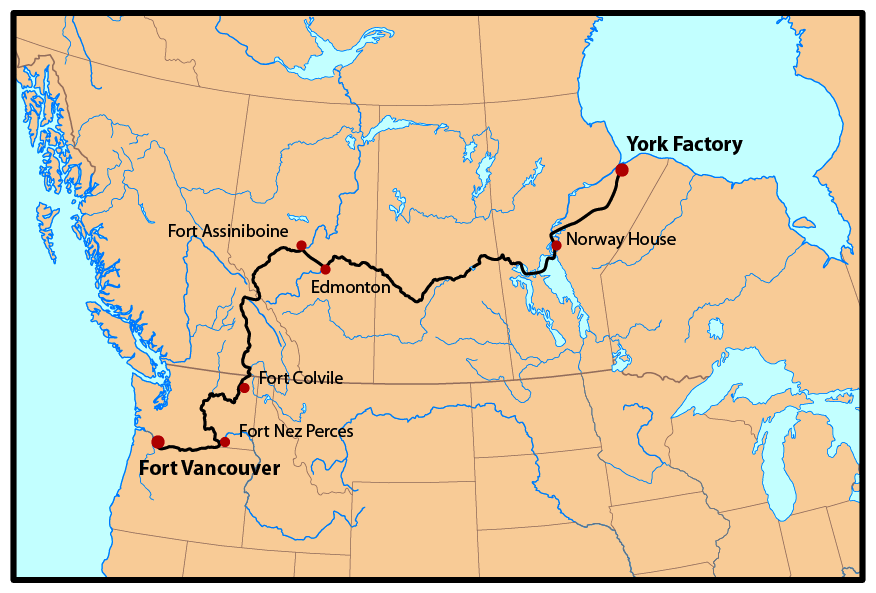
Map of the route of the York Factory Express, 1820s to 1840s. Modern political boundaries shown.

== Managers ==
Manager	Rank	Tenure
John W. Dease	Chief Trader	1825-1829
Francis Heron	Chief Trader	1829-1831
Francis Ermatinger	Clerk	1831-1832
Francis Heron	Chief Trader	1833-1835
Archibald McDonald	Chief Trader	1835-1842
Archibald McDonald	Chief Factor	1842-1844
Francis Ermatinger	Chief Trader	1844-1846
Paul Fraser	Chief Trader	1845-1846
John Lee Lewes	Chief Trader	1846-1848
Alexander C. Anderson	Chief Trader	1849-1853
Augustus Pelly	Chief Trader	1853-1854
George Blenkinsop	Chief Trader	1857-1859
Angus McDonald	Clerk	1856-1871
J. W. McKay	Chief Trader	1871

== See also ==
- Colville Indian Reservation
