= Ruth Karr McKee =

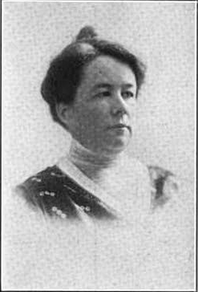
Ruth Karr McKee

Ruth Karr McKee (March 28, 1874 – 1951) was for several years a member of the Board of Regents, University of Washington.

== Early years and education ==
Ruth Karr was born in Hoquiam, Washington, on March 28, 1874, the daughter of James Karr and Abigail Boutwell Walker (b. 1840), and granddaughter of Presbyterian missionaries Mary Richardson (1811-1897) and Elkanah Walker (1805-1877).

In 1895 she obtained a B. A. and an M. A. from University of Washington. She was part of the sororities Phi Beta Kappa, Pi Lambda Theta, Phi Sigma Gamma.

== Career ==
Ruth Karr married James S. McKee, Honolulu, on May 6, 1902, and lived at Longview, Washington.

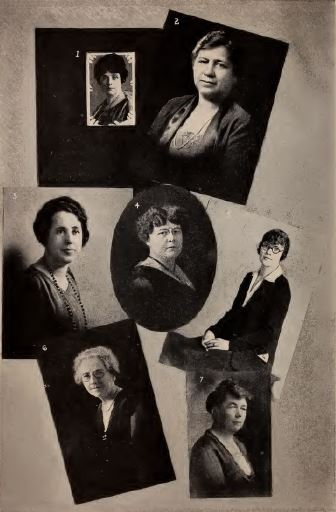
A Few of the Eminent Women of Washington, Mary Davenport Engberg, Bertha Knight Landes, Esther Stark Maltby, Mary J. Elmendorf, Esther Shepard, Alice D. Engley Beek, Ruth Karr McKee

She was President of the Washington State Federation of Women's Clubs from 1913 to 1915, Director of the General Federation in 1916. She was a member of the State Council of Defense from 1917 to 1919, a Member of the Board of Regents of the University of Washington from 1917 to 1926, and president of the Board in 1923.

McKee was also member of the American Association of University Women, the Round Robin Club, the Longview Community Service Club (Mary Richardson Walker Chapter), the Daughters of the American Revolution, the American Academy of Political and Social Science and the National Economic League.

She is the author of Mary Richardson Walker: Her Book (1945). The Walkers were one of six couples sent by the American Board of Commissioners for Foreign Missions to the Oregon Mission. The Walkers and the Eells established the mission at Tshimakain, near the present day town of Ford, Washington, to work with the Spokane Indians. The Walkers later moved to the Willamette Valley of Oregon.

McKee died in 1951.

The Ruth Karr McKee Papers 1941-1943 are hosted at the Manuscripts, Archives, and Special Collections division of the Washington State University Libraries.
