= Mary Augusta Dix Gray =

American missionary

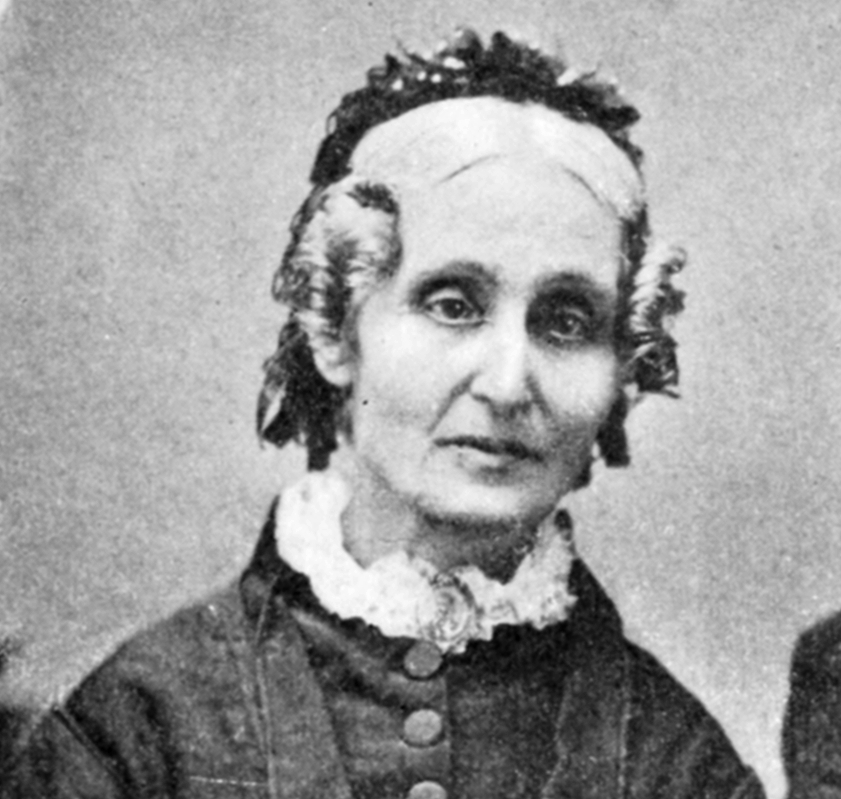
- Born: Mary Augusta Dix; January 2, 1810; Champlain, New York, US
- Died: December 8, 1881 (aged 71); Clatskanie
- Occupation: Missionary
- Employer: American Board of Commissioners for Foreign Missions
- Spouse: William Henry Gray
- Children: nine (7 survived)

Mary A(u)gusta Dix Gray or Mrs. William H. Gray (January 2, 1810 – December 8, 1881) was an early American missionary to Nez Perce people in the Oregon Territory in 1838. She was one of the first six European American women to cross the Rocky Mountains on what would become the Oregon Trail.

== Life ==
Gray was born in Champlain, New York in 1810 where she had a religious upbringing. In 1838 William H. Gray returned from near Walla Walla where he was a founding member of an American Board of Commissioners for Foreign Missions mission. He had originally intended to pick up his fiancé but her parents found out that he had nearly been killed in an ambush and refused to let their daughter leave with him. Her future husband tried to find another potential wife and in time proposed to Mary at a Church social on Valentine's Day. He asked her to join the mission as his wife. After a brief engagement they were married and she was one of the first women to travel up what would become the Oregon Trail to the Whitman mission. Spalding and Whitman had been the first women to make the journey and Gray arrived with Mary Fairbanks Eells, Mary Richardson Walker, Sarah Gilbert White Smith and their husbands. It took them 129 days from Independence to the Spalding-Whitman Mission arriving 29 August 1838. After being welcomed by the Whitmans they were sent on to help Henry H. Spalding and Eliza Hart Spalding at their mission in Lapwai in what is now Idaho. There Mary taught a class of the Nez Perce people and she would lead singing on a Sunday. Her husband did not get on well with the other missionaries and none would agree to share accommodation. He had been originally employed as a mechanic and assistant, but he wanted to found his own mission. He eventually obtained permission, but the plan came to nothing. Her husband wrote letters of complaint and eventually tendered his resignation. At one point Mary had to journey through snow with an eight month old child because her husband required her to be with him.

They left the mission in November 1842 with their son and two daughters. Their son was said to be one of the first European American boys to be born west of the Rockies. The mission lasted until 1849 when all of the missionaries were killed by the Cayuse. The Grays took on a long journey by boat and wagon and they had to be rescued by the Hudson's Bay Company.

Mary and Mary had nine children and seven survived their childhood. William and Mary were running a laundry when news came of the gold rush in California. William sold off two thirds of the laundry and left Mary to run it and look after their children whilst he went off to find gold.

Gray died in Clatskanie on 8 December 1881. She and her husband were reburied at the Whitman Mission National Historic Site Cemetery at Walla Walla in Washington in 1916.
