= Stephen and Parthena M. Blank House =

Historic house in Oregon, United States

- U.S. National Register of Historic Places
- U.S. Historic district – Contributing property
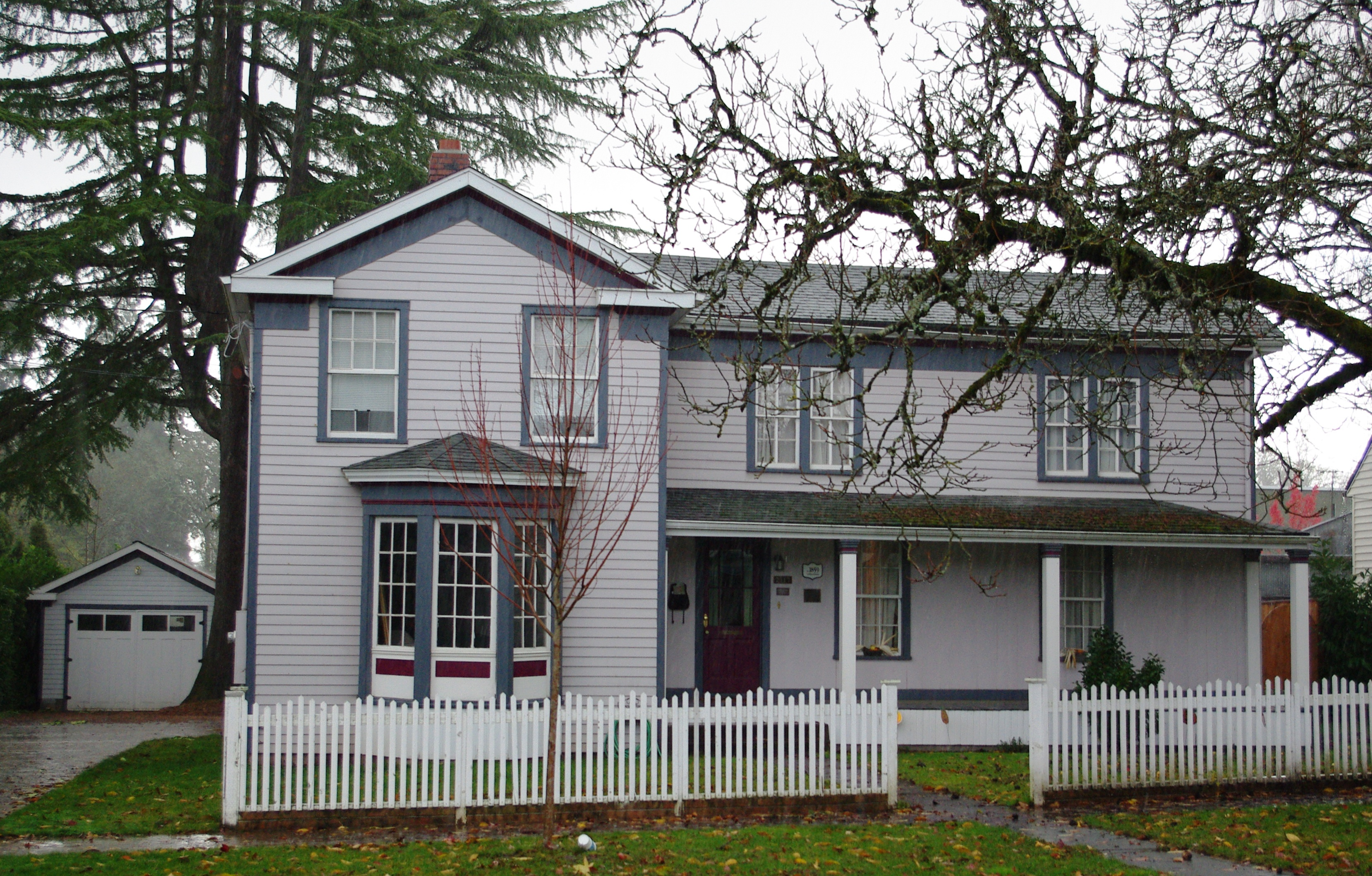
- The Blank House in 2009
- Location: 2117 A Street; Forest Grove, Oregon
- Coordinates: 45°31′17″N 123°06′49″W
- Area: Less than 1 acre (0.40 ha)
- Built: c. 1858 (construction); 1895 (relocation)
- Architectural style: Greek Revival
- Part of: Walker Naylor Historic District (ID11000155)
- NRHP reference No.: 88001035
- Added to NRHP: July 14, 1988

The Stephen and Parthena M. Blank House, also known as the Old Stagecoach Stop, is a historic residence located in Forest Grove, Oregon, United States. Built in 1858 or 1859, it is one of Forest Grove's distinctive examples of mid-19th century Greek Revival architecture. Gradual extensions of the structure from the 1850s to the 1880s employed multiple frame construction methods; the house particularly exhibits clear remnants of the balloon-frame and box-frame techniques of the period. Oral tradition suggests that the house was also used as an overnight stagecoach inn on the route between Portland and Tillamook in the late 19th or early 20th century. It was listed on the National Register of Historic Places in 1988.

== See also ==
- Alvin T. Smith House
- National Register of Historic Places listings in Washington County, Oregon
