= Karl Andreas Geyer =

German botanist (1809–1853)

- Born: 1809
- Died: 1853 (aged 43–44)
- Other names: Charles Andreas Geyer, Carl Andreas Geyer
- Scientific career
- Fields: Botany
- Author abbrev. (botany): Geyer

Karl (Charles) Andreas Geyer (30 November 1809 – 21 November 1853) was a German botanist who was a native of Dresden.

== Biography ==
As a teenager, Geyer worked as an apprentice-gardener in Zabeltitz, and in 1830 became an assistant at the botanical gardens in Dresden. From 1835 to 1844 he performed botanical studies on several expeditions within the United States. In 1838-40 he worked as a botanist in the Upper Midwest for geographer Joseph Nicollet (1786-1843), and in 1841-42 collected plants in Illinois, Missouri and the Iowa Territory for botanist George Engelmann (1809-1884). Geyer distributed duplicate specimens in an exsiccata-like series without title.

Afterwards he joined explorer William Drummond Stewart (1795–1871) on an expedition through the present-day states of Nebraska and Wyoming. Eventually, Geyer parted company with Stewart, and performed extensive botanical research in what would later be known as the Oregon Territory. The plant specimens Geyer collected in 1843/44 were supposed to be sent to George Engelmann in exchange for Engelmann paying most of the expense of outfitting Geyer for the journey. However, Geyer left the U.S. west coast by boat, and sailed to England, delivering the plant specimens to William J. Hooker at Kew instead. In 1845 he returned to Germany, where he purchased land in Meissen and started a nursery. During his later years, he was an editor of the horticultural journal Die Cronik des Gartenwesens.

Geyer has a number of plant species named after him, including Allium geyeri (Geyer's onion) and Euphorbia geyeri (Geyer's spurge). His botanical collection of nearly 10,000 specimens was acquired by the Royal Botanical Gardens at Kew.

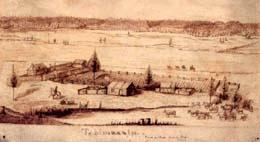
Tshimakain Mission (in what is now Washington State, U.S.) drawn by Charles A. Geyer in 1843.
