= Salem Cross Inn =

- White Homestead-Salem Cross Inn
- U.S. National Register of Historic Places
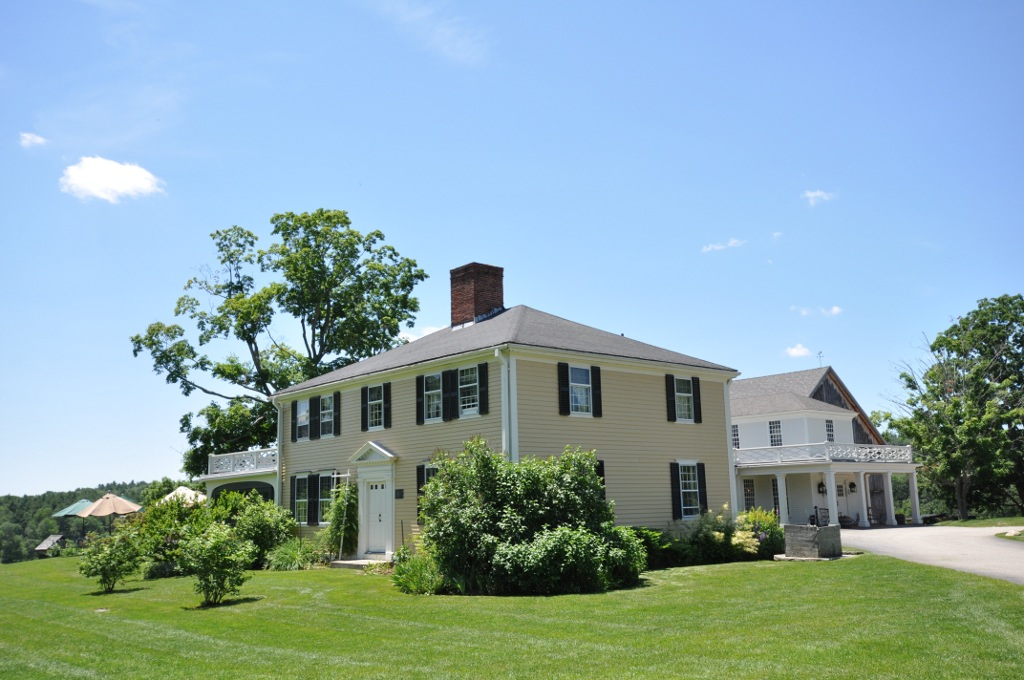

- Location within Massachusetts Location within the United States
- Location: 260 West Main St. (MA 9), West Brookfield, Massachusetts
- Coordinates: 42.24425°N 72.17324°W
- Area: 60 acres (24 ha)
- Built: 1707
- Built by: White, John
- Architectural style: Colonial
- NRHP reference No.: 09000619; 09000093
- Added to NRHP: April 14, 1975; April 14, 1978

The Salem Cross Inn is a restaurant on a working farm at 260 West Main Street (Massachusetts Route 9) in West Brookfield, Massachusetts. It is located in the White Homestead, a c. 1740 Georgian style house built on the site of a c. 1707 house which now stands elsewhere on the property. The property has been listed twice on the National Register of Historic Places, in 1975 and 1978.

== Description and history ==
The Salem Cross Inn is located on 600 acres (240 ha) in western West Brookfield, on the south side of West Main Street. The main building is a large connected New England farmstead, consisting of a handsome Georgian-style main house, and a series of ells extending behind it to a barn. The main house is a two-story wood frame structure, with a hip roof, central chimney, clapboard siding, and stone foundation. The interior spaces retain original flooring and woodwork, and substantial portions of its original plasterwork. A short way west of the main building stands the original White Homestead, now converted to a carriage barn.

The property was granted to John White, the grandson of the Mayflower-born Peregrine White. in 1707 for service to the town during recent conflicts with Native Americans. Soon thereafter he built the original homestead. In 1710 he was killed in a Native American attack, one of the last to occur in the area. The main house and barn were built in 1740 by his sons, John and Cornelius White. Prominent later residents of the house include the missionary sisters Sarah White Smith and Adeline White Tracy, who performed religious missionary work in the Oregon Country and in Singapore, respectively.

== See also ==
- National Register of Historic Places listings in Worcester County, Massachusetts
