= Mary Richardson Walker =

American missionary (1811–1897)

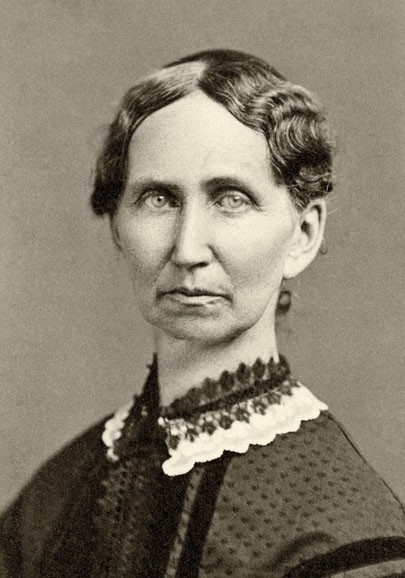
Mary Richardson Walker - one of the first six women over the Rockies

Mary Richardson Walker (April 1, 1811 – December 5, 1897) was an American missionary. She was the daughter of Joseph and Charlotte Richardson of West Baldwin, Maine. Both parents were school teachers and valued education for all their children. She attended Maine Wesleyan Seminary. Mary wanted to be a missionary and applied at the American Board of Missionaries, but she was turned down, because she was not married.

William Thayer, a mutual friend of Mary Richardson and Elkanah Walker, knew they wanted to be missionaries, so he set up a meeting between them. After a 48-hour courtship, Elkanah proposed to Mary. A year later on March 5, 1838, they married hurriedly so they could depart for the Oregon Country as missionaries.

== Trip to Oregon Country ==
The Walkers departed her home at North Yarmouth, Maine on March 7, 1838, for Boston, Massachusetts and then to Independence, Missouri for the long trip across the continent with three other couples: Cushing and Myra Eells, Asa and Sarah Gilbert White Smith, and William and Mary Augusta Dix Gray. Mary Walker became pregnant and traveled side-saddle for most of the 1900 miles. The missionaries arrived at the Whitman Mission on August 29, 1838.

== Tshimakain Mission created ==
On September 20, 1839, the Walker and Eells family arrived at Tshimakain and began setting up their new homes among the Spokan Indian tribal people. The Walkers lived at the Tshimakain Mission for ten years. Six months, after the Whitman Massacre, 60 members of the Oregon Volunteers traveled up to the mission and brought the Walkers and Eells families to the Willamette Valley, Oregon Country.

== Settled in Forest Grove, Oregon ==
The Walkers moved to Forest Grove, Oregon in October, 1849. While living at Forest Grove, the Walkers helped establish Tualatin Academy (now Pacific University.) When the Tualatin Academy became Pacific University in 1866, the Walkers donated land for the new campus and Elkanah served as a university trustee until his death. Cushing Eells became the first principal of Tualatin Academy and later founded Whitman College as a memorial to the martyred Whitman's. Elkanah Walker's name is on the charter of both Whitman Seminary and Whitman College. On December 5, 1897, Mary Richardson Walker died at Forest Grove. She died at the home of her son Levi. She was the last surviving member of the original thirteen members of the Old Oregon Mission.

== Children ==
- Cyrus Hamlin Walker, born December 7, 1838, at Waiilatpu, first white male born in the Oregon Territory.

At Tshimakain:

- Abigail Boutwell Walker, born May 24, 1840, mother of Ruth Karr McKee
- Marcus Whitman Walker, born March 16, 1842
- Joseph Elkanah Walker, born February 10, 1844
- Jeremiah Walker, born March 7, 1846
- John Richardson Walker, born December 31, 1847

At Forest Grove, Oregon:

- Levi Chamberlain Walker, February 8, 1850
- Samuel Thompson Walker, May 2, 1852

== Mary Walker School named in her honor ==
The Mary Walker School District and Mary Walker High School in Springdale, Washington are named for her.

== See also ==
- Walker Naylor Historic District
