= Walker Naylor Historic District =

Historic district in Oregon, United States

- U.S. National Register of Historic Places
- U.S. Historic district
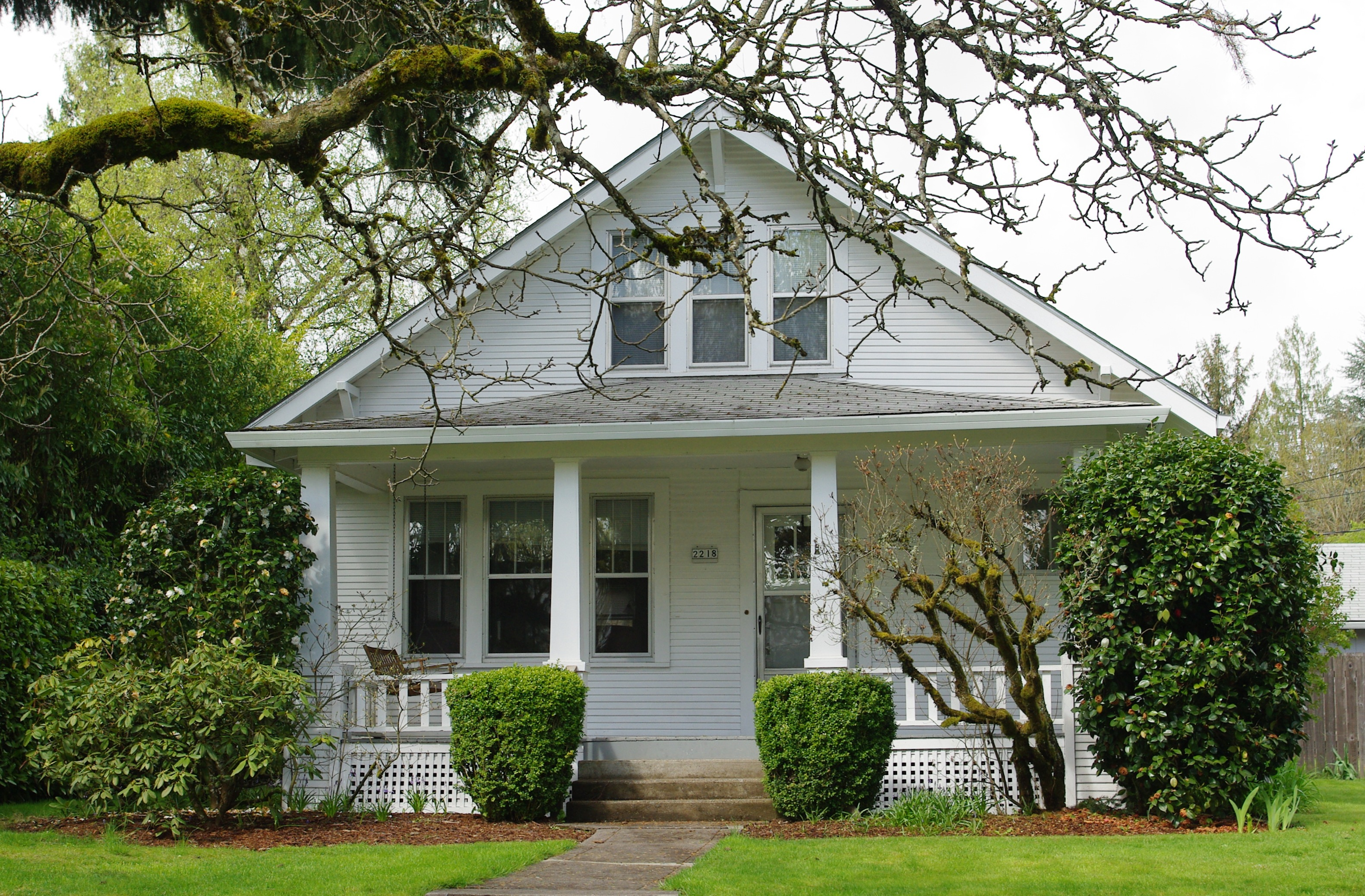
- 2218 C Street, a home in the district
- Location: Forest Grove, Oregon
- Coordinates: 45°31′23″N 123°06′56″W
- Area: Gayles Way, Covey Run Drive, A Street, and 21st Avenue
- NRHP reference No.: 11000155
- Added to NRHP: March 3, 2011

The Walker Naylor Historic District, also referred to as Walker's and Naylor's Additions Historic District, located in Forest Grove, Oregon, is listed on the National Register of Historic Places (NRHP). The district is bounded by Gayles Way on the west, Covey Run Drive on the north, A Street on the east, and 21st Avenue on the south, which is west of Pacific University and north of the city's downtown area. Walker Naylor was added to the NRHP in 2011, the third historic district in Forest Grove. The district has 145 properties covering 32 acres (13 ha), and includes three houses listed on the National Register.

== Background ==
Part of the area that became the neighborhood was settled in 1844 by Thomas G. and Sarah Naylor, while the other portion was claimed by Elkanah Walker in 1849. In 1858, the first house in the district was built. Forest Grove was incorporated in 1872, and the next year it was platted, listing the Walker and Naylor additions. The neighborhood continued to grow with landowners building a house, and then subdividing the property to sell of lots. After slow growth, the number of houses increased greatly in the first two decades of the 1900s, before slowing in the 1920s and 1930s. As of 1912 there were 68 homes in the district, which grew to 145 by 1959. Walker Naylor then experienced a housing boom following World War II.

== Details ==
The area was added to the National Register of Historic Places on March 3, 2011. Architectural styles in the 33-acre (13 ha) district include craftsman, bungalow, English Cottage, Traditional, Colonial Revival, Tudor Revival, Queen Anne, and Ranch, among others. Homes individually listed on the NRHP are the Stephen and Parthena M. Blank House, the Dr. W.R. and Eunice Taylor House, and the Harry A. Crosley House.

== See also ==
- National Register of Historic Places listings in Washington County, Oregon
