= Ruth E. McKee =

- Born: Ventura County, California
- Died: West Chatham, Massachusetts
- Spouse: 1927–28 (divorce): Darr H. Alkire
- Children: Michael E. Alkire

Ruth Eleanor McKee was a writer and served as the United States consul at Tokyo beginning in 1958. She is known for the 1941 Doubleday novel Christopher Strange about California in the last half of the 19th century. Other works include the 1936 Under One Roof and the 1934 The Lord's Anointed.
