= Cushing Eells =

American missionary and educator

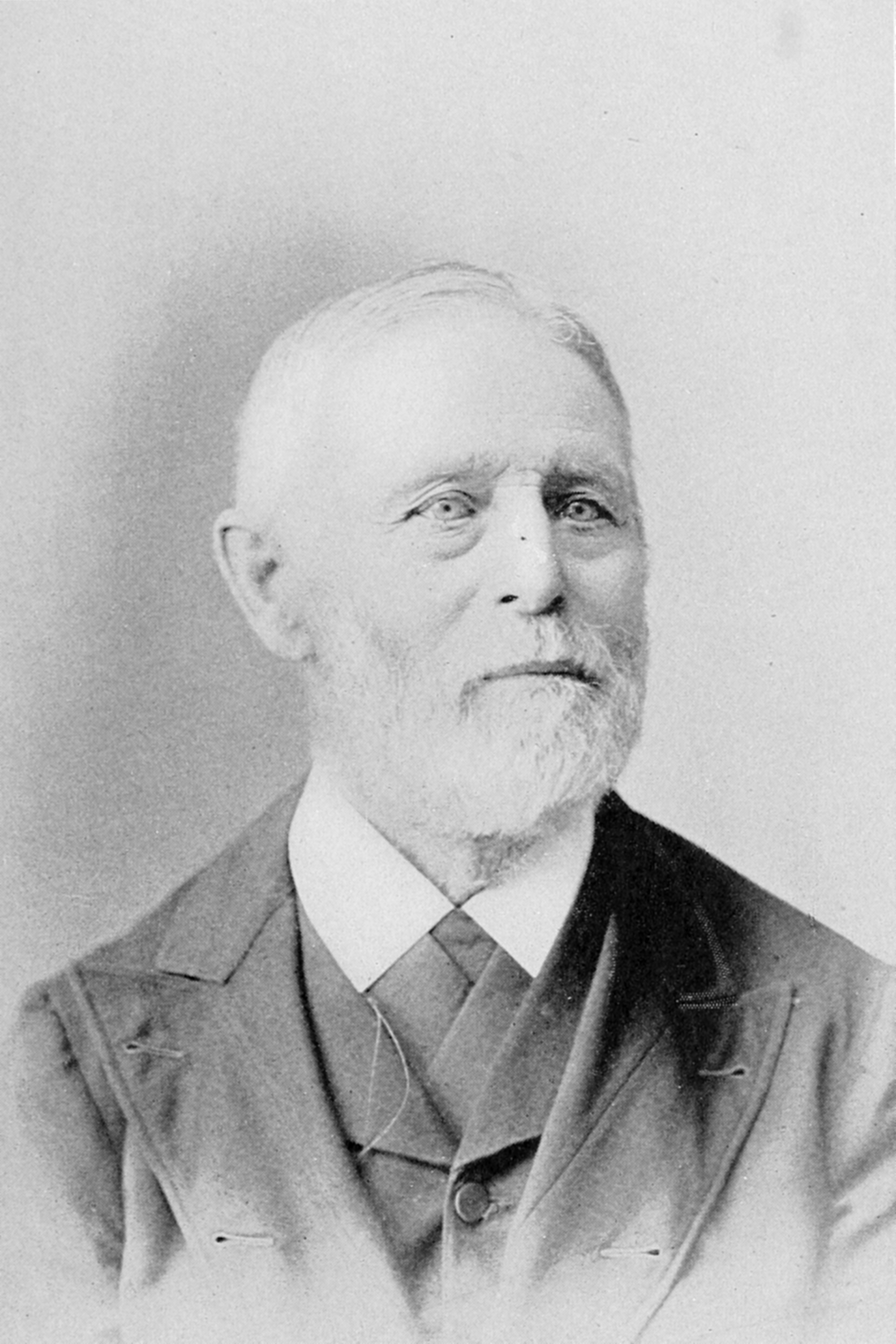
- Born: February 16, 1810; Blandford, Massachusetts, US
- Died: February 16, 1893 (aged 83); Tacoma, Washington, US
- Occupation: Congregational Missionary

Cushing Eells (February 16, 1810 – February 16, 1893) was an American Congregational church missionary, farmer and teacher on the Pacific coast of America in what are now the states of Oregon and Washington. His first mission in Washington State was unsuccessful. Eells and his family had to leave after the Native Americans massacred a group of neighboring missionaries. They spent the next fourteen years farming and teaching in Oregon, before returning to Washington, where Eells founded a seminary that later became Whitman College. Eells continued to teach and preach in Washington for the remainder of his life.

== Early years (1810–38) ==
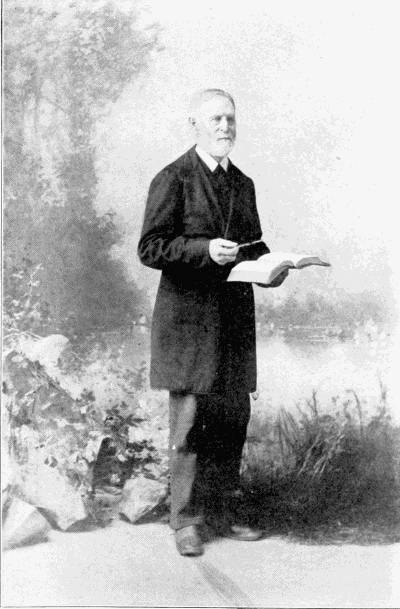

Cushing Eells was born at Blandford, Massachusetts, on February 16, 1810. His parents were Joseph Eells and Elizabeth Eells, née Warner. He attended Williams College, and graduated in 1834, then went on to the East Windsor Theological Institute (later the Hartford Seminary) in Connecticut, from which he graduated in 1837. During vacations from the seminary he taught school. While teaching in Holden he met his future wife Myra Fairbanks (born on May 26, 1805), the eldest daughter of Deacon Joshua and Sally Fairbanks.

In the spring of 1837 the American Board of Commissioners for Foreign Missions appointed Cushing and his fiancee Myra as missionaries to the Zulus in southeast Africa. They were advised to postpone their marriage until the eve of their departure. Eells was ordained as a Congregational minister on October 25, 1837. After a tribal war broke out the plans had to change. (Note: The internal Zulu wars soon escalated. On February 6, 1838, the Zulus led by Dingane killed a group of Afrikaner settlers led by Piet Retief, and the white settlers became involved in fighting the Zulus.) On December 5, 1837, Cushing and Myra were asked if they would be willing to go to Oregon instead, and they accepted the offer.

== Tshimakain (1838–48) ==
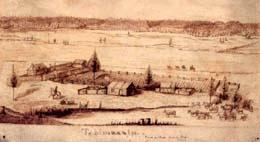
Tshimakain Mission, 1843, by Charles A. Geyer (1809–53)

On March 5, 1838, Eells married Myra Fairbanks in Massachusetts. The couple left the next day for the west coast with fellow-missionaries Elkanah and Mary Walker, William and Mary Gray, Asa Bowen Smith and his wife. On August 29, 1838, the party arrived at the winter lodge site of the Cayuse people at Waiilatpu on the Walla Walla River in what is now Washington state. The site would later be called the Whitman Mission after Dr. Marcus Whitman. The Eells and Walker families moved on to Tshimakain among the Spokanes. On September 16, 1838, Eells conducted the first Protestant service in Stevens County at Chewelah, preaching through an interpreter.

On January 11, 1840, the Eells house burned. Local Indians responded quickly to assist. When the Fort Colvile leader Archibald McDonald heard about the fire, he dispatched four men to make the house habitable. The Eellses had two sons while living at Tshimakain. Edwin Eells was born on July 27, 1841, and Myron Eells was born on October 7, 1843. Dr. Marcus Whitman was the attending physician at both births. Myra was thirty-seven years old when her first son was born. Myron Eells would become a missionary, and spent much of his life on the Skokomish Reservation, to the west of Puget Sound, where his brother Edwin was Indian Agent. Cushing and Myra Eells' mission was not successful. Myra Eells wrote in 1847, "We have been here nine years and have not yet been permitted to hear the cries of one penitent or the songs of one redeemed soul."

== Willamette Valley (1848–62) ==
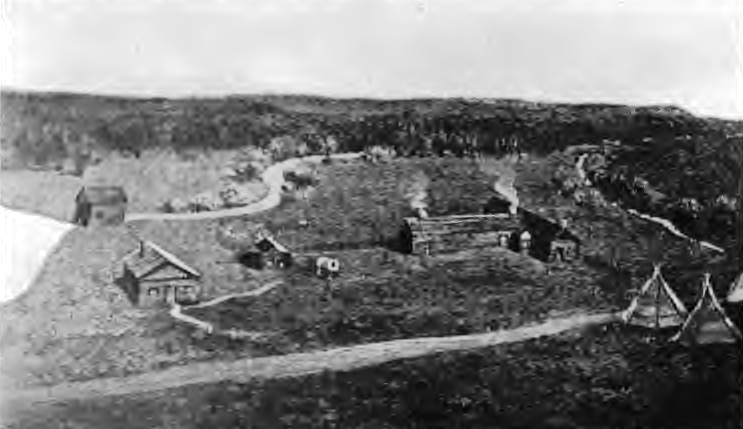
Sketch of the Whitman mission at Waiilaptu

On November 29, 1847, the Whitmans and eleven other missionaries at Waiilaptu were killed in what became called the Whitman massacre. Tension had been building between the Cayuses and the growing numbers of American settlers in the area. A measles epidemic in November 1847 killed up to half the Cayuses, but only a few of the whites were affected. Some of the Cayuses blamed Whitman for the deaths of his patients, and this led to the killings, followed by the Cayuse War. Colonel Henry A. G. Lee, Oregon Volunteers called for volunteers to bring the Tshimakain missionaries to the Willamette Valley and safety. Major Joseph Magone with 60 volunteers escorted the Eells and Walker families to Oregon City on June 22, 1848. (Note: Some traders and ranchers settled at Waiilatpu in 1853. In 1855 the Cayuse, Walla Walla and Umatilla tribes were told to move 40 miles (64 km) south to a small area near Pendleton, Oregon. Further fighting commenced. The settlers were evacuated from the Walla Walla valley and the buildings were burned down.)

The Eellses reached the Willamette Valley in 1848. They settled in Forest Grove, Oregon, where they stayed for the next fourteen years. In 1855 Eells was dismissed by the American Board of Home Missions. At the time he was working a donation claim and also teaching. Cushing Eells taught at different schools in the Tualatin Plains, One was the Oregon Institute which later became Willamette University. In 1849 Eells founded the Tualatin Academy, now Pacific University.

== Washington (1862–93) ==
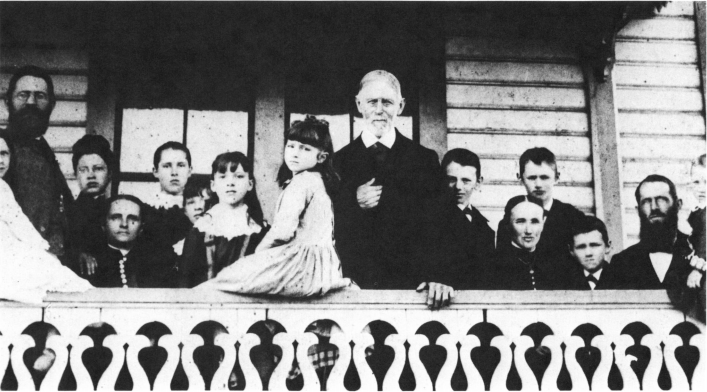
Eells family portrait, Puyallup (1888). Men are Edwin Eells (left), Cushing Eells (center) and Myron Eells (right).

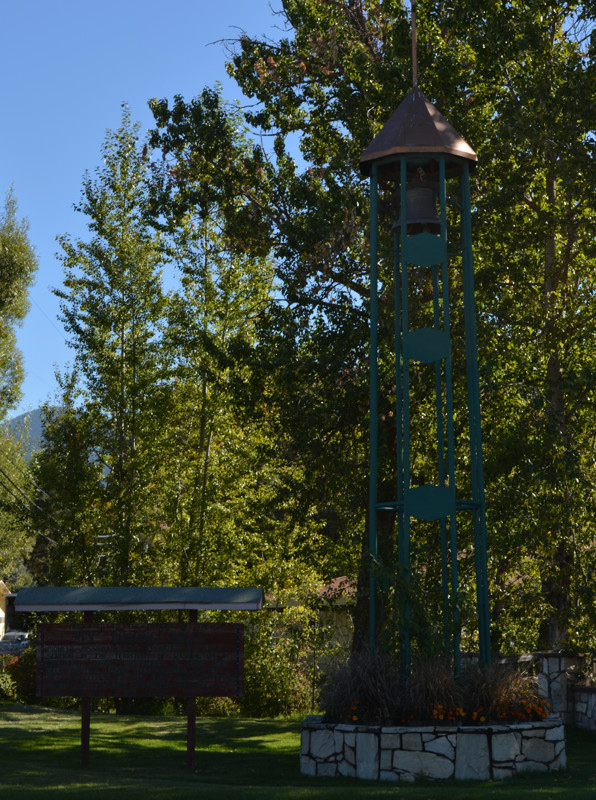
Eells Bell, Chewelah, Washington

The government reopened the northern region to settlement in 1859. In 1860 Cushing Eells acquired the mission claim area at Waiilatpu. He settled there with his family in 1862. Due to what he called a religious experience he decided to build a school on the site in memory of the Whitmans. The school was more than 7 miles (11 km) from the new town of Walla Walla, and did not attract pupils. Eells bought land nearer to the town, where he started the Whitman Seminary. The first building was dedicated on October 13, 1866, on the site now occupied by the Whitman Conservatory of Music. The seminary opened on September 14, 1866, with Eells as the first principal. Eells was also appointed superintendent of schools for Walla Walla County. He devoted much effort in the years that followed to founding Congregational churches and schools in Washington Territory and raising money for the seminary. (Note: The seminary was later renamed Whitman College and became secular in nature.)

Eells became overworked with the demands of his farm, school and superintendent work. His house burned down in 1872. With his wife's support Eells resigned from his positions, sold his land and returned to the Willamette Valley. In 1872 he went to live with Edwin Eells at Skokomish, Washington, where he preached to both whites and Indians. In July 1874, Reverend Eells came back to the Chewelah area, the only one of the four missionaries to do so. The following Sunday, Eells conducted two services for the natives and two more for the white settlers at Chewelah. Eells consulted with John A. Simms, Indian agent for the area and located at Chewelah. He was pastor of the church at Skokomish from 1874 to 1876. Myra Eells died in Skokomish on August 9, 1878, at the age of seventy-three. Her son Myron Eells preached the funeral sermon.

Cushing Eells established the first Congregational Church at Chewelah in 1879 in the home of Thomas Brown (1827–1908). Eells continued to often preach to Indian groups in his later years, spent in eastern Washington. He spent his last years at the Puyallup Reservation, sometimes still working among the Indians. In 1892, a church was erected at Chewelah, although Reverend Eells was living west of the Cascade Mountains, he came and offered prayer in the new church some 54 years to the day after he first camped on the site. He gifted a bell for this church. He bought it in New York and paid for it a few days before his death.

Cushing Eells died on February 16, 1893, in Tacoma, Washington, aged 83. The historic marker beside the Chewelah church reads:

Dedicated to the memory of the Rev. Cushing Eells, pioneer missionary who preached his first sermon in the territory of Washington [still Oregon Territory at that time] in Chewelah, Sunday, September 16, 1838. The bell in this tower was donated by the Rev. Mr. Eells to the First Congregational Church of Chewelah, arriving February 11, 1893, the day of his death.

== Sources ==
- Arksey, Laura (2010-08-24). "Chewelah Chewelah -- Thumbnail History". HistoryLink.org.
- Castile, George P. (April 1981). "Edwin Eells, U.S. Indian Agent, 1871-1895". The Pacific Northwest Quarterly. 72 (2). University of Washington: 61–68. JSTOR 40490672.
- Durham, N. W. (1912). The History of the City of Spokane and Spokane County, Washington, From its earliest existence to the Present Time. Vol. 1. Spokane: The S. J. Clarke Publishing Company.
- Finnegan, Ryan (2014). "Whitman Mission - Later Occupants". National Park Service. Archived from the original on December 5, 2008.
- "Founder Cushing Eells". Whitman College.
- Lyman, William Denison (1918). Lyman's History of old Walla Walla County, Embracing Walla Walla, Columbia, Garfield and Asotin counties. Vol. 1. Chicago: S.J. Clarke Publishing Company.
- Markham, J. David (2011-09-30). "Whitman Massacre". The Encyclopedia of North American Indian Wars, 1607–1890: A Political, Social, and Military History. ABC-CLIO. ISBN 978-1-85109-697-8.
- Paulus, Michael J. Jr (2008). "Cultural Record Keepers: The Myron Eells Northwest History Collection, Whitman College". Libraries & the Cultural Record. 43 (2).
- Walker (1963). The Cambridge History of the British Empire. CUP Archive. GGKEY:J4RZC934KC3.
- Walker, Mary Richardson; Eells, Myra Fairbanks (1963). On to Oregon: The Diaries of Mary Walker and Myra Eells. U of Nebraska Press. ISBN 0-8032-6613-8.
