= Asa Bowen Smith =

American Congregational missionary

Reverend Asa Bowen Smith
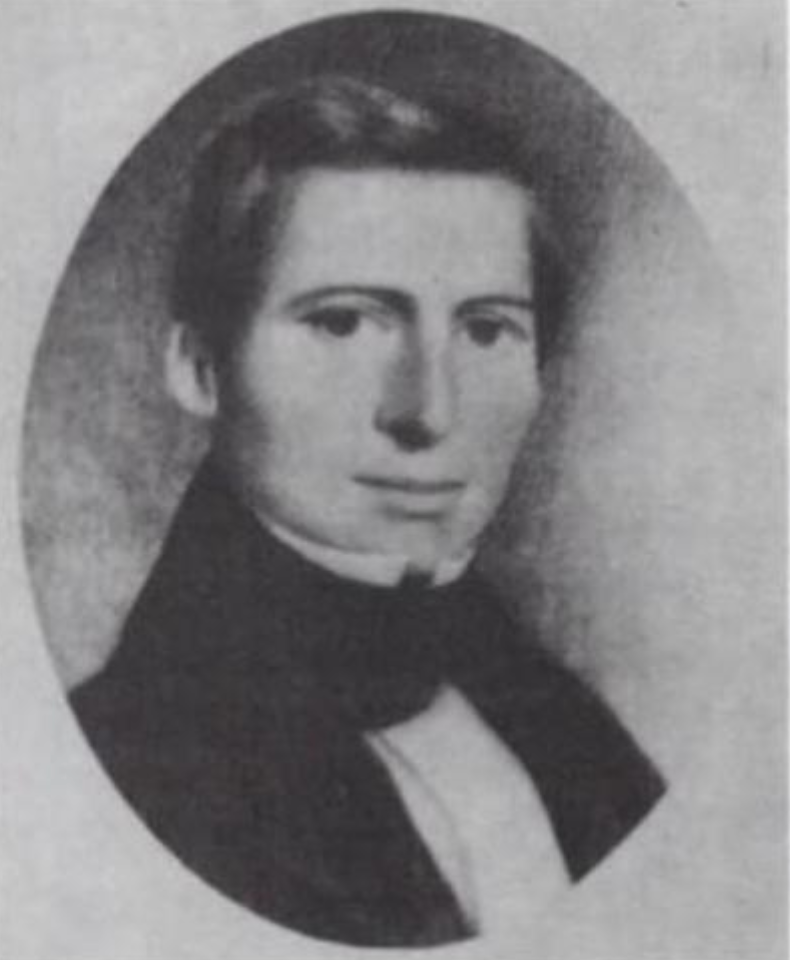
- Asa Bowen Smith, miniature portrait, 1837, Missionary Album
- Born: July 16, 1809; Williamstown, Vermont, U.S.
- Died: February 10, 1886 (aged 76); Rocky Hill, Connecticut, U.S.
- Burial place: Buckland, Massachusetts, U.S.
- Other names: A.B. Smith
- Education: Middlebury College, Andover Theological Seminary, Yale Theological Seminary
- Occupation(s): Minister, missionary
- Years active: 1838–1886
- Known for: Missionary, creator of Nez Perces grammar
- Spouse(s): Sarah Gilbert White Smith, Harriet E. Smith
- Parent(s): Asa and Polly Waller Smith
- Church: Congregational Church
- Ordained: 1836
- Writings: Grammar of the Language of the Nez Perces Indians Formerly of Oregon, U.S.

Asa Bowen Smith, also known as A.B. Smith (July 16, 1809 – February 10, 1886), was a Congregational missionary posted in Oregon Country and Hawaii with his wife Sarah Gilbert White Smith. In 1840, Smith wrote the manuscript for the book Grammar of the Language of the Nez Perces Indians Formerly of Oregon, U.S.. He conducted the first census of the Nez Perce. After eight years as a missionary, he returned to the Northeastern United States where he was a pastor of the Buckland Congregational Church in Massachusetts and of the Congregational Church in Southbury, Connecticut.

He attended Middlebury College, Andover Theological Seminary, and Yale Theological Seminary and was ordained in 1837.

== Early life and education ==
Asa Bowen Smith was born in Williamstown, Vermont, on July 16, 1809. His parents were Asa and Polly Waller Smith and four of his twelve siblings were Laura, Marcia, Lucia, and John Curtis Bowen Smith. There were only six children that made it into Smith's adulthood. They grew up on the family farm in Middlebury, Vermont. Smith worked on the farm until he was 21 years of age. From 18 to 21, he prepared for college by studying at home and reciting to a local lawyer.

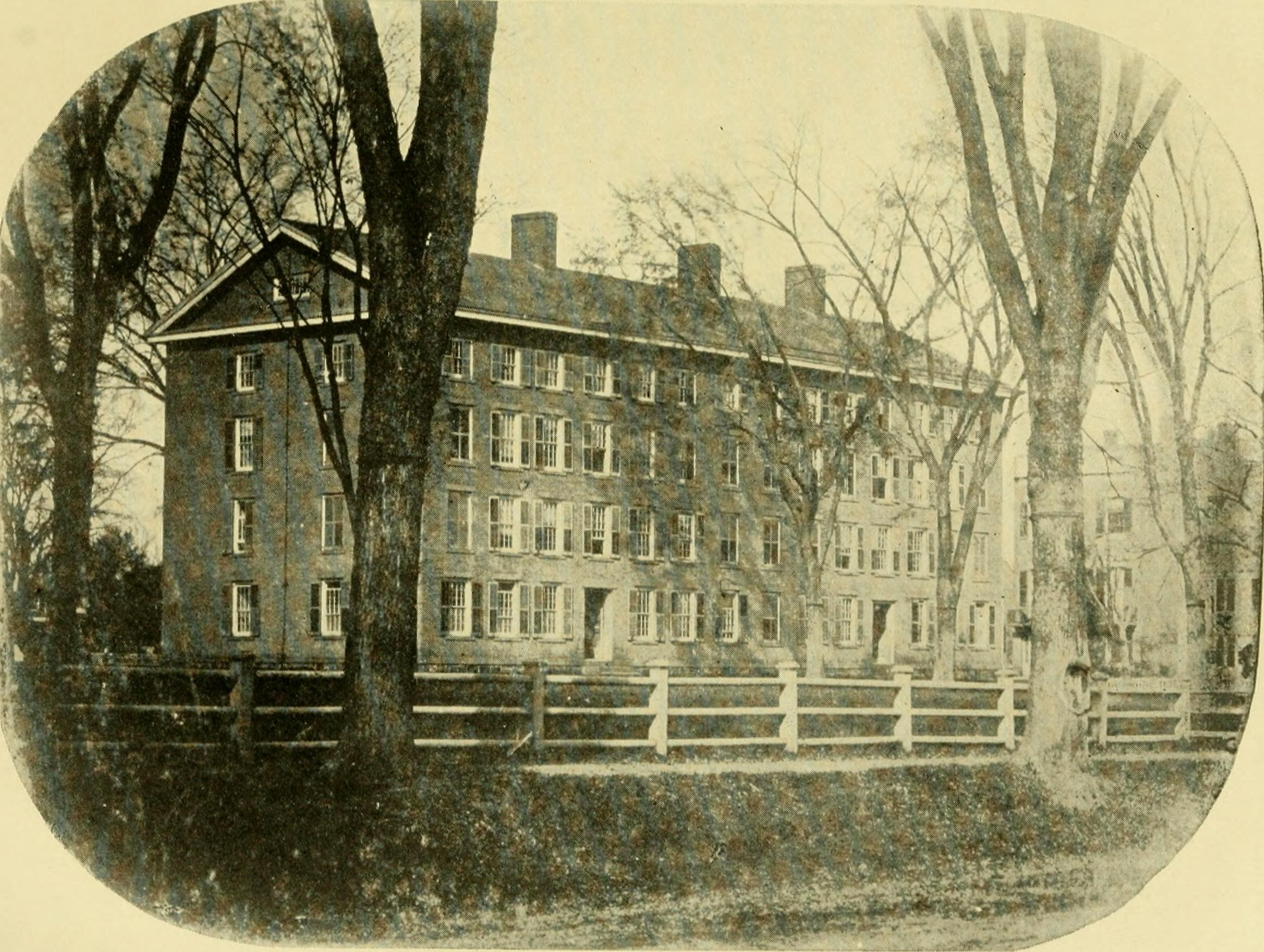
Yale Theological Seminary

He first attended the University of Vermont, and taught school to pay for his education. He joined the Congregationalist Church in 1831 and was inspired to become a preacher. He encouraged his three sisters and two of his brothers to convert to the Congregational Church. He received a scholarship from the American Education Society to become a minister. He transferred to Middlebury College, a Congregational-supported school, in 1832 and he graduated with a Bachelor of Arts degree in 1834. He attended Andover Theological Seminary (1834–1836) and Yale Theological Seminary, graduating in 1837. Believing that it would be helpful as a missionary to have medical training, he studied medicine as well at three medical schools. While away at college and the seminaries, he began livelong correspondence with his brother and sisters, which are archived at the Beinecke Rare Book & Manuscript Library of the Yale University Library. In the spring of 1837, he preached at the Congregationalist Church in Woodbridge, Connecticut, five miles northwest of New Haven. He lived a spartan lifestyle. For a time, he ate crackers soaked in warm water and molasses. He walked where he needed to go, like to medical school and to the family home. He had a number of walks between 20 and 100 miles. Friends helped with expenses, like room and board and books. He also worked as a carpenter building furniture.

== Sarah Gilbert White Smith ==
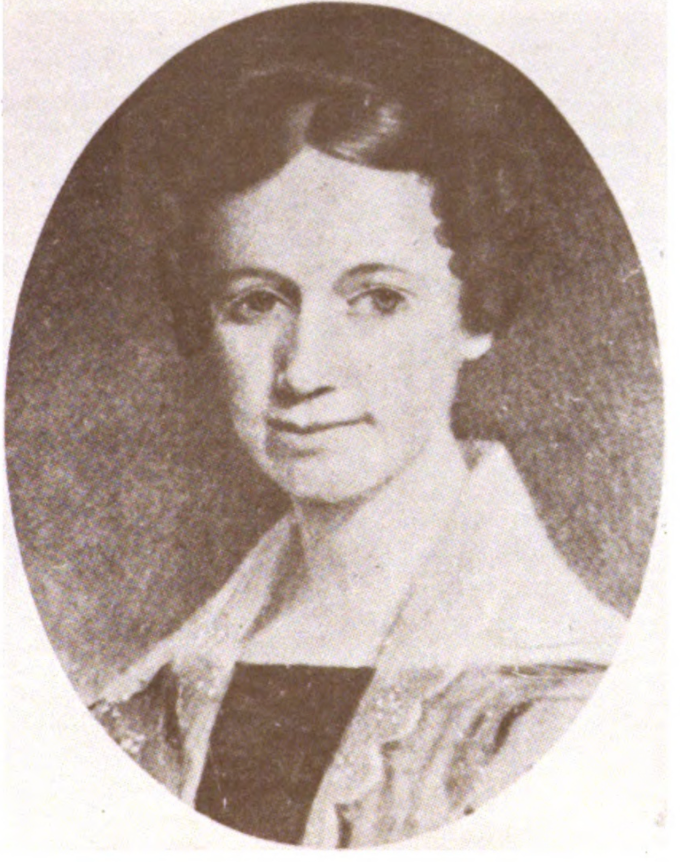
Sarah Gilbert White Smith, 1837, Missionary Album

Smith met Sarah Gilbert White in the fall of 1835. (Note: There are differing dates of birth for Sarah. Her tombstone says that she was born April 14, 1813, but that is considered an error. Per correspondence, it is believed she was born September 14, 1813. (i.e., 9/14/1813 vs. 4/14/1813)) She wanted to become a missionary. Her parents, Sarah Gilbert and Alfred White of West Brookfield, Massachusetts, had been missionaries. Her older sister Adeline was a missionary stationed in Singapore, where she married Ira Tracy. Both of them were missionaries of the American Board of Commissioners for Foreign Missions. Sarah had a brother Samuel and another sister Roxanna. The family lived at the White homestead, now known as the Salem Cross Inn.

Sarah studied at a seminary in Pittsfield, Massachusetts, in 1835. In 1836, she attended Murdock Place Seminary in New Haven, Connecticut, while Smith attended the seminary at Yale. She had been a school teacher and became an engaged woman by March 3, 1837. On March 13, 1838, she was appointed as a missionary. (Note: The wedding was delayed because the American Board was short of funds in 1837 due to a recession. Once there was an assignment for them, they were married. They had hoped to be placed in Siam so that they would be nearer to Adeline and Ira Tracy in Singapore, but the American Board had no plans for opening a station there at the time.)

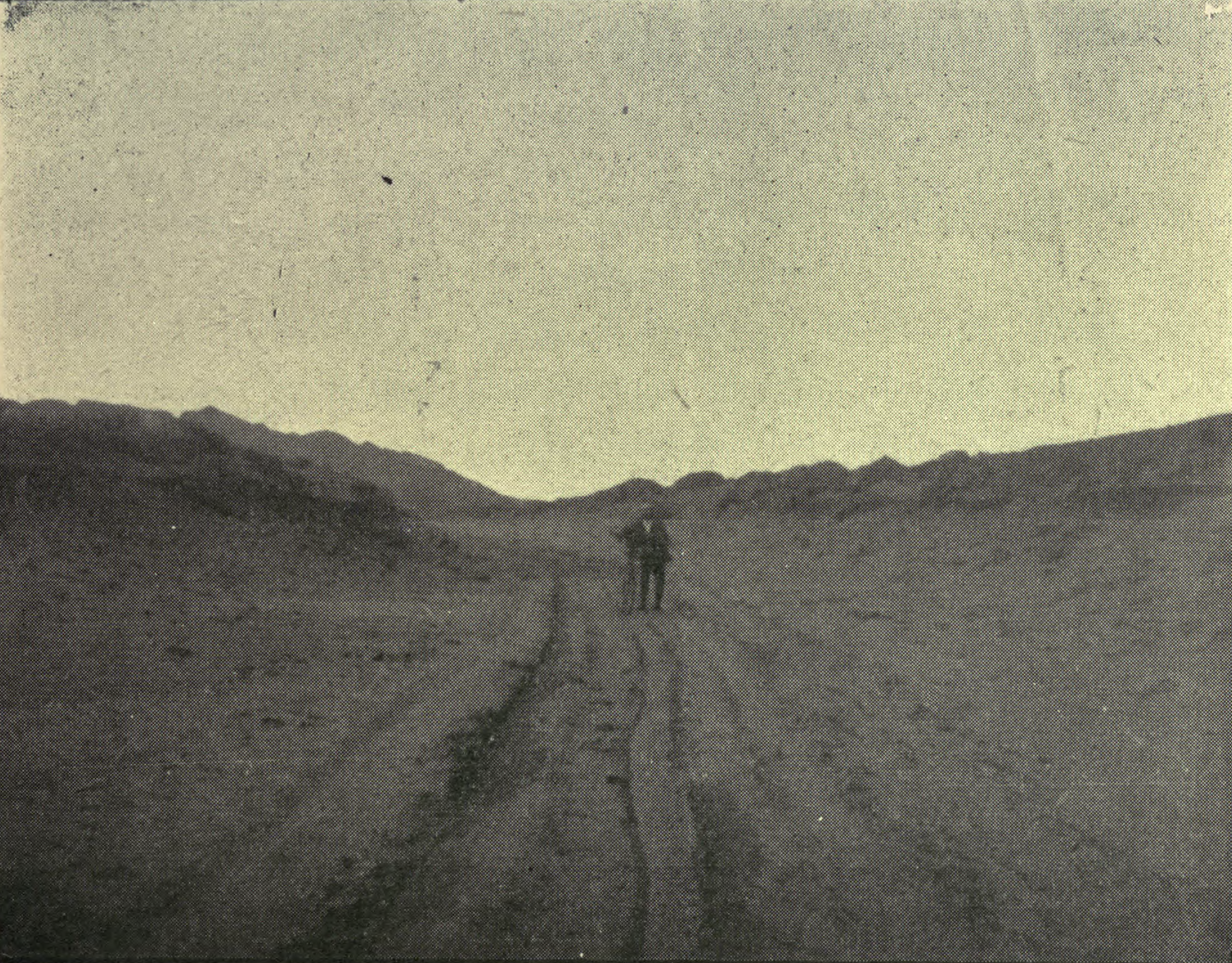
Oregon Trail along the Sweetwater River

Smith married Sarah Gilbert White on March 15, 1838. Sarah kept a diary of her experiences from March 10, 1838, through September 14, 1839, which narrated the Smith's journey from Springfield, Massachusetts, to the Whitman Mission in Waiilatpu in present-day Washington. They and others joined missionary Marcus Whitman.

While in the Sandwich Islands (Hawaii), they took in three orphaned girls, Lucy, Martha and Mary. Their parents were Edwin Locke (1813–1843) and Martha Laurens Rowell Locke (1812–1842) of the Eight company of missionaries. (Note: The Smiths were said to have had four children. which may have been because the Lockes had four children, but their eldest, a son, died in 1841.) The Smiths adopted Lucy and Martha. Martha, also known as Maude, married G.M. Hubbard of New York City. Lucy Maria Locke Smith married Rev. Elijah Harmon. She died in June 1871, and Smith continued to have a relationship with his son-in-law. He was named in Smith's will, along with Martha. (Note: After Lucy's death, Harmon married Eunice Morse Smith on March 4, 1872. Eunice, Smith's niece, was the daughter of John Curtis Bowen Smith and Mary Snell Smith. Eunice died on August 14, 1872. John and Mary were missionaries who had left their five oldest children with family members and friends in the United States when they returned to Ceylon (present-day Sri Lanka) in 1860.) Mary Sabin Locke was adopted by her uncle Dr. Samuel Newell Bowell of Malta, New York. She married a man named Wilson, lived in San Francisco, and had a son who was a missionary in Hawaii.

Sarah died of consumption (tuberculosis) on May 27, 1855. She was buried in Buckland, Massachusetts.

== Missionary ==
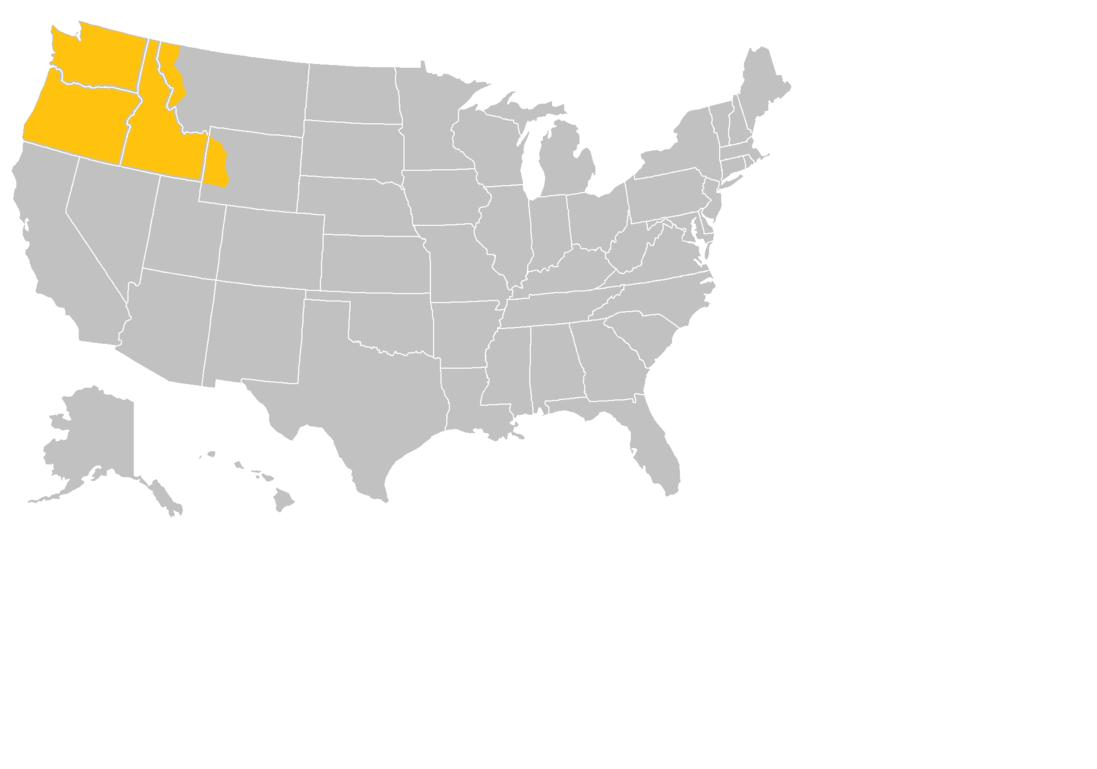
A map of the Oregon Country within present-day United States in the early 19th century Pacific Northwest.

He was ordained on November 1, 1837, and decided to become a missionary. Soon after, the American Board of Commissioners for Foreign Missions appointed him as a missionary to Oregon Country. On March 15, 1838, the same day that they were married, the Smiths traveled across the American continent towards the Pacific Ocean. They travelled west with other missionaries—Cushing Eells, Elkanah Walker, and William H. (W.H.) Gray—and their wives. (Note: The couples met in New York City on March 20th. From there they traveled by boat for 30 miles and then rode railroad trains to Philadelphia and then Chambersburg, Pennsylvania. From there, they began their exhausting and treacherous ride on stage coach. They arrived in Pittsburgh and took a steamer up the Ohio River to St. Louis, Missouri. The group traveled on a steamboat to Independence, Missouri, where they prepared for their overland journey. The women made two tents for two couples each. They purchased flour, sugar, and rice. Twenty five horses were purchased; the women were trained to ride the horses and the horses were trained to carry women in side saddles. A one-horse wagon was purchased, as well as twelve cattle. They bought guns and hunting knives for self-protection. They started their frontier travel on horseback from Independence on April 20th. It had taken them one month to get to the Mississippi River and would take four months to get to the Whitman mission in the Pacific Northwest. During that time, "Christian forbearance had been put to too great a test." The journey was made over rough trails and across streams that were difficult to ford. They were in danger due to wild animals and hostile Native Americans. The weather was bad and the missionaries were often ill. They had no privacy; the couples slept in a tent with another couple.)

=== Whitman Mission, Waiilatpu ===
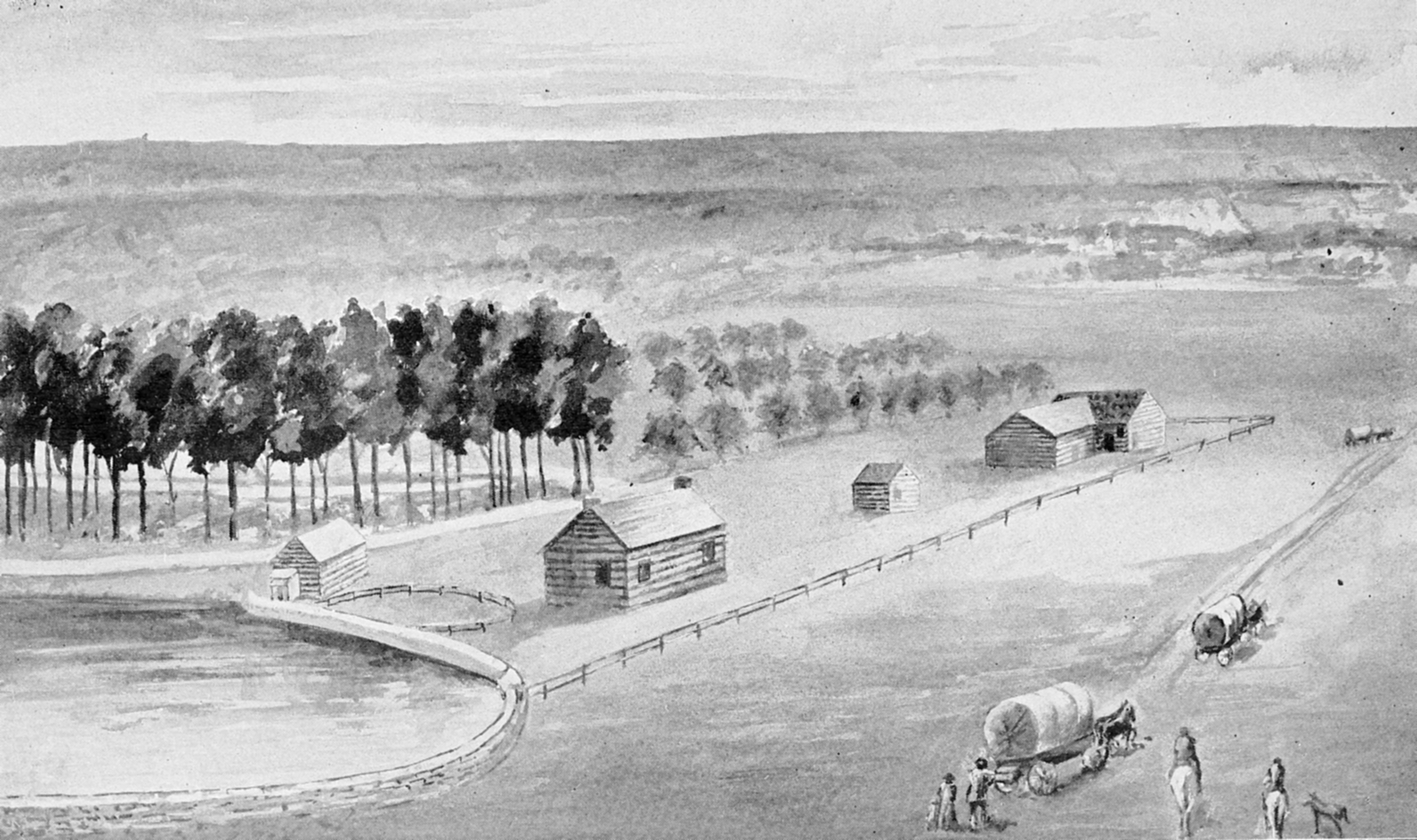
Whitman Mission Station along the Oregon Trail at Waiilatpu, from How Marcus Whitman Saved Oregon by O. W. Nixon

They were initially at Waiilatpu in present day Washington. After a falling out with Marcus Whitman, Smith stated that if he was to be stationed with Whitman, he would leave the mission. The missionaries had a difficult time establishing themselves with the local Native Americans, due to language barriers and vast differences in religious concepts. Among the missionaries, there were philosophical differences in approach. Smith thought that the missionaries should learn their language and work amongst them to develop relationships. Smith was against evangelization of Native Americans and forced resettlement. This was at odds with the approach of Henry H. Spalding of the Oregon missions. (Note: Five years after the Smiths left Oregon Country, the Whitmans and some other missionaries were killed during the Whitman massacre of 1847.) Smith felt that the natives should not acquire the white people's way of life, concerned that they would become "worldly minded". He was unsure of his usefulness at the Whitman mission and pessimistic that the mission would be successful.

The mission established a farm, blacksmith shop, printing press, and mills. Smith conducted the first census of the Nez Perce people. In the Smith's letters and diaries, they wrote in great detail about the lives of the Nez Perce people. This provided a "wealth of new information not only upon the customs, traditions, and manner of life of the Nez Perces, but also upon the difficulties which the pioneer missionaries faced in their isolated stations." Sarah's mental and physical health were very poor and Smith took care of the farm and the housekeeping. Smith had a Hawaiian laborer named Jack. (Note: The Hudson's Bay Company felt that Hawaiians were good laborers and by 1810 they had imported them to the Pacific Northwest.)

=== Kamiah ===
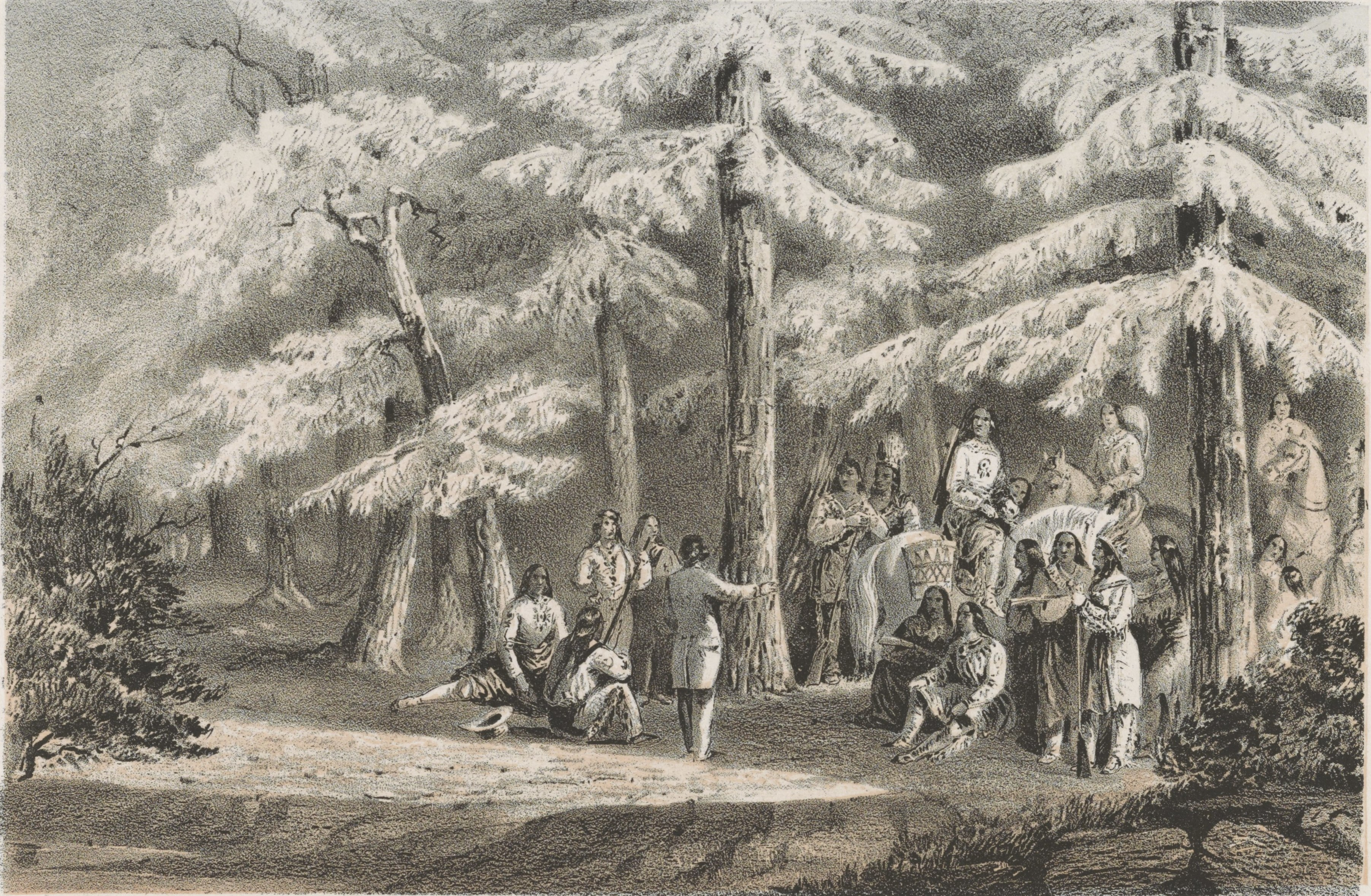
Nez Perce people

About early May 1839, the Smiths went to Kamiah, south of Lapwai in present-day Idaho, which was the heart of Nez Perce country. They lived in a make-shift shelter, in an "open house" without windows or a floor. Initially he was there to learn the Nez Perce language, but after some time, a new mission station was opened at Kamiah. By November 11, a cabin was built for them on the north bank of the Clearwater, near their former shelter, and their belongings were brought to the village for the cabin. Smith preached on Sundays, and taught, although there was no official school. He also ran his farm. Sarah's health was poor beginning about August 1839. Smith described her condition as feeble in a letter. She took mercurial remedies for her liver.

=== Nez Perce grammar ===
Smith learned the Nez Perce language from Hol-lol-sote-toot. Mountain men called him "Lawyer" because of his astuteness. Lawyer knew two native languages, that of his father Chief Twisted Hair and his mother a Flathead woman—as well as some English. Lawyer, from Kamiah, was their guide and assistant.

Smith developed a Nez Perce grammar by adapting the missionary alphabet used in Hawaiian missions. In 1840, Smith wrote the manuscript for the book Grammar of the Language of the Nez Perces Indians Formerly of Oregon, U.S.. It is written in Nez Perce language and English.

=== Leaving the Whitman mission ===
Insinmalakin and Inmtamlaiakin, subchiefs of the Nez Perce at Kamiah, ordered Smith to leave the village on October 14, 1840. The natives resented that the whites were encroaching on their land and lives without their permission. They wanted Smith to pay for the land where his house and farm were established. The Smiths left the mission on April 19, 1841. By that time, both of the Smiths were in poor health, Sarah so much so that the only way that they could leave the mission was in a canoe. They first went to Fort Walla Walla and then went to Vancouver where they convalesced. Needing a better climate, they went to the Sandwich Islands, arriving on January 25, 1842, where the couple's health improved significantly.

=== Hawaii ===
At his request, Smith was transferred to the Sandwich Islands (Hawaiian) Mission in 1842 and stayed there until October 1845. They were stationed at Waialua on the island of Oahu. They adopted three girls who were the orphaned daughters of Mr. and Mrs. Locke. Smith's voice failed in 1845 and they left the islands, traveling a seven-month journey to Canton, China and around Cape Horn, and then to Massachusetts. His voice recovered in 1846.

== Congregational minister ==
He was the pastor of a church in South Amherst, Massachusetts, in 1847, and then of the Buckland Congregational church in March 1848 in Massachusetts. (Note: He was also said to have gone to Buckland in 1846.) There was a controversy that arose in 1859, which was investigated by the Congregational ecclesiastical committee. Smith was cleared of the complaints, but it was recommended that he find another church. He left in August 1859. He was the pastor of the Congregational Church in Southbury, Connecticut, from January 1860 to May 1871. The Smiths moved to Rocky Hill, Connecticut.

== Marriage to Harriet E. Nutting ==
In June 1856, Smith married Miss Harriet E. Nutting of Amherst, Massachusetts. She had been a teacher in Ohio and other places. She was also described as a scholar. Harriet had poor health that prevented the Smiths from going to Minnesota for the American Home Missionary Society. She was living at the time of his death.

== Later years and death ==
Smith lived in Rocky Hill, Connecticut, until 1884 when he moved to Sherwood, Tennessee. He organized a church there and was its minister until his death of pneumonia on February 10, 1886. (Note: An obituary printed in the Vermont Watchman and State Journal stated that he died on February 10, 1886. It was published on February 24, 1886. A biography by the National Park Service stated that he died on February 16, 1886.) He was initially buried in Sherwood and later moved next to Sarah at a cemetery in Buckland, Massachusetts. Harriet died in Rocky Hill on May 22, 1886, at the age of 60.

Papers regarding his position with the American Board of Commissioners for Foreign Missions are among the collection of the Research Library of the Oregon Historical Society.

== Sources ==
- Hawaiian Mission Children's Society (1901). Portraits of American Protestant Missionaries to Hawaii. Hawaiian Gazette Company.
- Smith, Sarah Gilbert White; Smith, Asa Bowen; Drury, Clifford Merrill (1999). "Biographical Sketches of Asa Smith and Sarah White". The Mountains We Have Crossed: Diaries and Letters of the Oregon Mission, 1838. University of Nebraska Press. ISBN 978-0-8032-6621-6.
- Spalding, Henry H.; Smith, Asa Bowen; Drury, Clifford Merrill (1958). The Diaries and Letters of Henry H. Spalding and Asa Bowen Smith Relating to the Nez Perce Mission, 1838-1842. Northwest historical series,4. Arthur H. Clark Company. hdl:2027/mdp.39015001662900.
- Whitman, Narcissa Prentiss (1997-01-01). Where Wagons Could Go: Narcissa Whitman and Eliza Spalding. University of Nebraska Press. p. 273. ISBN 978-0-8032-6606-3.
