= Archibald McDonald =

Scottish-Canadian fur trader (1790–1853)

- GillEasbaig Mac Aonghais 'Ic Iain 'Ic Alain Dhuibh
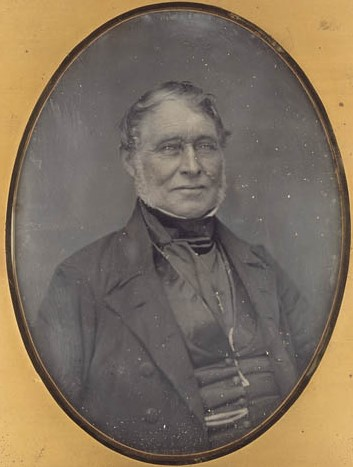
- Born: 3 February 1790; Leechkentium, Argyll, Scotland
- Died: 15 January 1853 (aged 62); St. Andrew's East, Canada East
- Resting place: Saint-André-d'Argenteuil, Quebec, Canada
- Occupations: Deputy governor of Red River Colony; clerk and later chief trader for the Hudson's Bay Company
- Years active: 1813–1848
- Spouses: Princess Sunday (m. 1823; died 1824) Jane Klyne (m. 1825)
- Children: Ranald; Angus (1826–1843); Archibald Junior; Alexander; Allen; Mary Ann; John (1836); John (1837–1861); Donald and James; Samuel; Joseph; Benjamin; Angus Michel (1846–1867)
- Parent(s): Angus McDonald; Mary Rankin

Archibald McDonald (3 February 1790 – 15 January 1853) was chief trader for the Hudson's Bay Company at Fort Langley, Fort Nisqually and Fort Colvile and one-time deputy governor of the Red River Colony.

== Early life ==
McDonald was born in Leechkentium (Scottish Gaelic: Leac an Tuim), Glen Coe, on the south shore of Loch Leven, in Appin, then located in the county of Argyll, Scotland, the last of 13 children born to parents Angus and Mary (née Rankin). His paternal grandfather, Iain (or John) McDonald, had been one of the few male survivors of the Massacre of Glencoe.

== The Red River Colony ==
As a young man, McDonald became friends with Lord Selkirk, and joined the Red River Colony as a clerk and agent, in part because he could act as an interpreter between the overseers of the colony, who spoke English, and the settlers, who, like him, were native Gaelic-speakers. He assisted in recruitment of the second group of colonists in Scotland, with the intention of departing for the New World with them in 1812. McDonald was delayed, however, under Lord Selkirk's orders, to receive further training in medicine and related subjects. In June 1813, McDonald left Scotland with a group of emigrants, arriving on the Red River one year later. In the winter of 1814–15, he was made deputy governor under Miles Macdonell. In 1820, he joined the HBC, and after the merger with the North West Company in 1821, was sent out to the Columbia River.

== Hudson's Bay Company ==
In 1828, he and Governor George Simpson traveled together from York Factory to the Columbia. In the same year, he was promoted to chief trader and put in charge of Fort Langley, near the modern city of Vancouver, British Columbia. He held that post until 1833, when he was reassigned to Fort Nisqually. In 1835, he was assigned to Fort Colvile, where he was chief trader from 1833 to 1841, and chief factor until 1844.

In 1848, he retired to St. Andrew's East, Canada East, on a homestead he named "Glencoe House" after his birthplace. It was here that he died in 1853.

== Personal life ==
In 1823, Archibald married Princess Raven (also known as Princess Sunday), daughter of Chief Comcomly of the Chinook Confederacy, but she died in 1824 giving birth to their son, Ranald. In 1825, Archibald married Jane Klyne, a daughter of Michel Klyne, French Canadian postmaster at Jasper House, and Suzanne Lafrance, of a prominent Métis family. They had thirteen children, and remained together until Archibald's death.

Preceded by James McMillan	Chief Trader at Fort Langley; 1828–1833	Succeeded by James Murray Yale
Preceded by Francis Heron	Chief Trader at Fort Colvile; 1842–1844	Succeeded by N/A
Preceded by N/A	Chief Factor at Fort Colvile; 1844–1846	Succeeded by Francis Ermatinger
