= Ford, Washington =

Unincorporated community in Washington, United States

- Unincorporated community
- Location within Washington (state)
- Coordinates: 47°54′30″N 117°48′21″W
- Country: United States
- State: Washington
- County: Stevens
- Elevation: 1,785 ft (544 m)
- Time zone: UTC-8 (Pacific (PST))
  - Summer (DST): UTC-7 (PDT)
- ZIP code: 99013
- Area code: 509
- GNIS feature ID: 1504949

Ford is an unincorporated community in Stevens County, Washington, United States. It is on Washington State Route 231 10.5 miles (16.9 km) south-southwest of Springdale. Ford has a post office with ZIP code 99013. Ford has a nondenominational community church.

== History ==
The town was built on the site of the Tshimakain Mission, which was active in the mid-19th century. A historical marker for the mission is located outside of the main town.

== Geography ==
Ford is located in southern Stevens County, approximately five miles north of the Spokane River which serves as the county's southern border. Tshimakain Creek flows into Chamokane Creek at Ford, which flows from the northwest across the Walkers Prairie through Ford and ultimately into the Spokane River. Chamokane Creek serves as the boundary of the Spokane Indian Reservation, which is located immediately west of Ford.

Washington State Route 231 is the main road through Ford.

Ford is located in a mountainous area at the base of Happy Hill, which rises more than 600 feet immediately to the southeast of the community. The northeast–southwest trending Walkers Prairie and valley floor along which Chamokane Creek flows is relatively flat and at an elevation of between 1,700 and 1,800 feet above sea level in the vicinity of the community.
