= Elkanah Walker =

American settler and missionary of Oregon and Washington

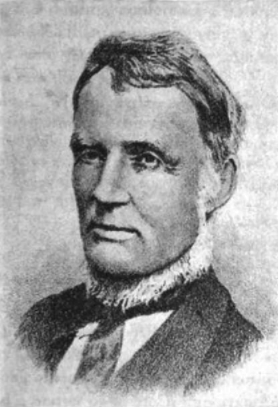
- Born: August 7, 1805; North Yarmouth, Maine
- Died: November 21, 1877 (aged 72); Forest Grove, Oregon
- Occupation: Pioneer

Elkanah Walker (1805–1877) was an American pioneer settler and Christian missionary in the Oregon Country in what is now the states of Oregon and Washington.

== Early life and education ==
Walker was born August 7, 1805, the sixth child of Jeremiah and Jane Walker, on a farm near North Yarmouth, Maine. He attended the Bangor Theological Seminary.

== Missionary career ==
Walker wanted to serve in Africa under the American Board of Commissioners for Foreign Missions, but unrest there led the board to direct him towards the Oregon Country. William W. Thayer introduced him to Mary Richardson, who also wanted to serve as a missionary. On April 22, 1837, Mary and Elkanah met, 48 hours later they became engaged. They married hurriedly on March 5, 1838 near her home, as they would depart on March 7 for their mission. They had eight children in the Oregon Country: Cyrus Hamlin Walker, Abigail Boutwell Walker (mother of Ruth Karr McKee), Marcus Whitman Walker, Joseph Elkanah Walker, Jeremiah Walker, John Richardson Walker, Levi Chamberlain Walker, and Samuel Thompson Walker.

The Walkers traveled to the Oregon Country with other missionaries. From August 1838 to June 1848, under the auspices of American Board of Commissioners for Foreign Missions, he and Cushing Eells and their wives created and lived at the Tshimakain Mission, studying the local language and bringing their Protestant faith to the Spokane People.

In 1842, Elkanah Walker with support from Cushing Eells printed the Spokane Primer, a Salish language primer. This was the first book written in Washington.

On November 29, 1847, Cayuse Indians massacred the members of the Whitman Mission in Walla Walla. Elkanah Walker and Cushing Eells were supposed to be at the Whitman Mission during the time of the massacre, but Elkanah Walker became sick, and Cushing Eells did not want to leave the families without support with during winter.

The Oregon Mounted Volunteers escorted the Eells and Walker families to the area of Oregon City, Oregon on June 22, 1848.

== Later life and death ==
After arriving in Oregon City, Elkanah Walker purchased a wagon on credit and began freighting goods. He and his family moved to Forest Grove, Oregon in October 1849, where he purchased a donation land claim. He began farming and preaching. For many years he served Congregational churches in Forest Grove. Walker was a member of the first Board of Trustees of Whitman College in 1860. He gave land to Pacific University in Forest Grove on which the first building was erected.

Elkanah Walker died at Forest Grove on November 21, 1877. Mary Walker lived until 1896 or 1897.

== See also ==
- Walker Naylor Historic District
