= Marcus Whitman Hotel =

Building in downtown Walla Walla, WA

Marcus Whitman Hotel and Conference Center
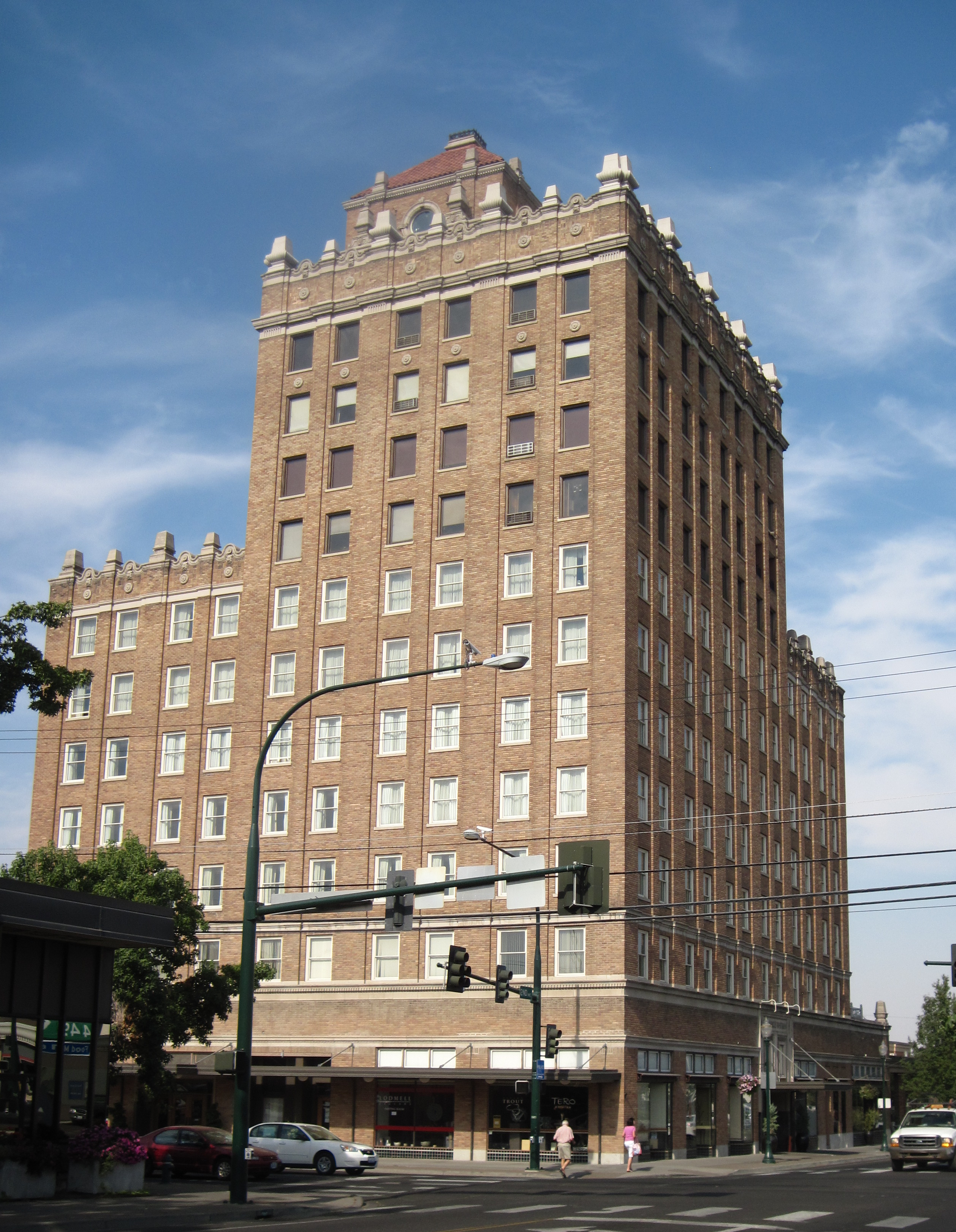
- Interactive map of the Marcus Whitman Hotel and Conference Center area

General information
- Status: Completed
- Location: 6 West Rose Street; Walla Walla, Washington, U.S.
- Coordinates: 46°04′04″N 118°20′26″W
- Opened: 1928

Height
- Height: 162 ft (49.4 m)

Technical details
- Floor count: 13

Website
- marcuswhitmanhotel.com

The Marcus Whitman Hotel and Conference Center is a hotel and historic building located in downtown Walla Walla, Washington. The hotel, colloquially referred to as "The Marc" after the fine-dining restaurant located on the first floor, is the tallest building in the Walla Walla Valley. The building was named for Marcus Whitman and has hosted several U.S. presidents, celebrities, and other notable people. The hotel building was listed on the National Register of Historic Places in 1999.

== History ==
The original thirteen-story tower was first planned by architect Sherwood D. Ford in 1927 and constructed shortly thereafter in 1928. President Dwight D. Eisenhower was a patron at the hotel during the week of September 19, 1954, while visiting several dams in Southeastern Washington and Northeastern Oregon, bringing state-wide attention to the hotel. The then governors of Washington and Oregon, Arthur B. Langlie and Paul L. Patterson, also attended the receiving events, including a motorcade and performances by fourteen area school bands. Lyndon B. Johnson, trumpeter Louis Armstrong, and actress Shirley Temple were also patrons of the hotel.

The hotel was one of the founding members of Western Hotels on August 27. 1930, and remained part of the chain until May 16, 1963.

After years of neglect, the hotel was in a state of disrepair and was purchased by a local entrepreneur in 1999, who employed the services of an architectural firm that had restored several other historic buildings. The hotel has since undergone major renovations while still preserving the historic value and integrity of the building. Construction on a new wing of the hotel started in 2000, and the renovations were completed in 2001, adding additional rooms and meeting spaces.

In 2017, following the death of Walla Walla native Adam West, who gained fame for his portrayal of Batman, the bat signal was projected onto the side of the hotel.

The hotel was sold in December 2022 to an investment group with local partners; Seattle-based Columbia Hospitality took over management. The sale was completed during renovations to the Marc Restaurant and shortly after the discovery of a gasoline leak in the basement that required cleanup.

== Awards ==
The hotel received the Valerie Sivinski Award for Outstanding Achievement in Historic Preservation Rehabilitation Projects from the Washington State Department of Archaeology and Historic Preservation following a major renovation in 2002.

The hotel was presented with the 2015 Hotel of the Year Award during the Annual Washington State Wine Awards. The Marc restaurant located in the hotel also received the 2015 Grand Award.
