= Walla Walla, Washington =

Walla Walla
- City
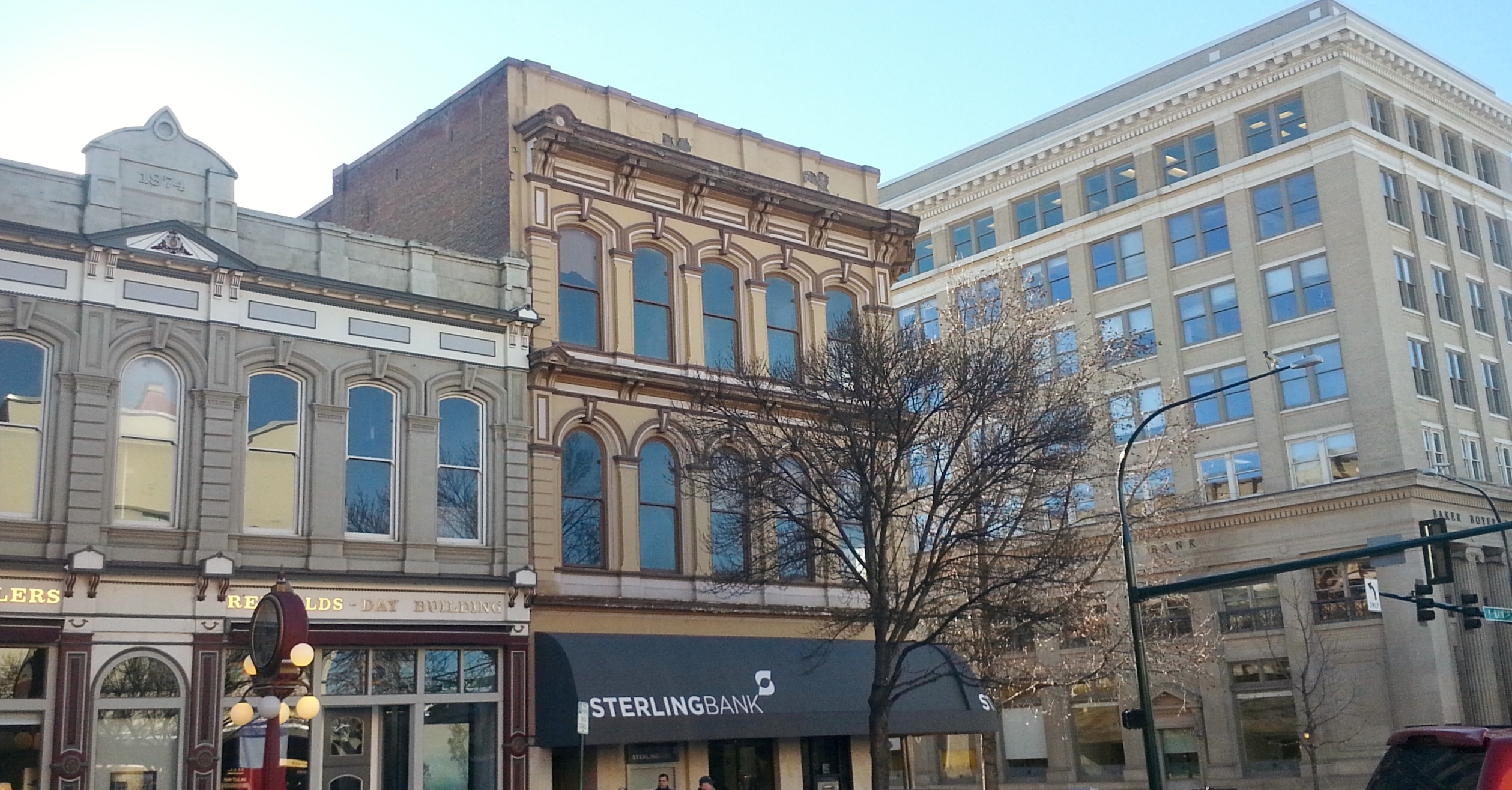
- Reynolds–Day Building, Sterling Bank, and Baker Boyer Bank buildings in downtown Walla Walla

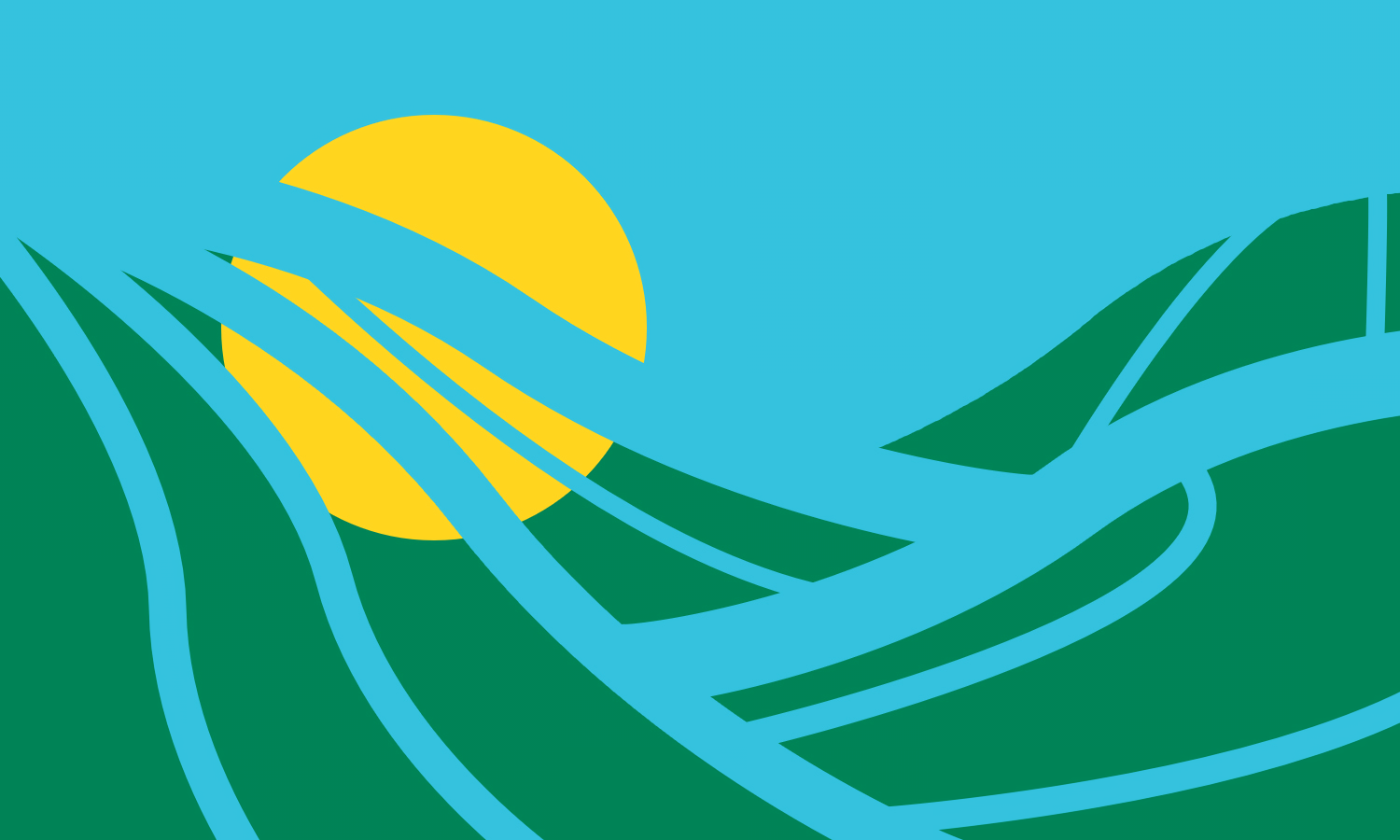
- Flag Logo

- Location of Walla Walla, Washington
- Coordinates: 46°04′45″N 118°18′49″W
- Country: United States
- State: Washington
- County: Walla Walla

Government
  - Type: Council–manager
  - Mayor: Gustavo Reyna
  - City manager: Elizabeth Chamberlain

Area
  - City: 13.88 sq mi (35.95 km^{2})
  - Land: 13.85 sq mi (35.86 km^{2})
  - Water: 0.031 sq mi (0.08 km^{2})
- Elevation: 965 ft (294 m)

Population (2020)
  - City: 34,060
  - Estimate (2024): 33,901
  - Density: 2,376.1/sq mi (917.42/km^{2})
  - Urban: 55,805 (US: 464th)
  - Metro: 62,682 (US: 382th)
- Time zone: UTC−8 (PST)
  - Summer (DST): UTC−7 (PDT)
- ZIP Code: 99362
- Area code: 509
- FIPS code: 53-75775
- GNIS feature ID: 2412168
- Website: wallawallawa.gov

Walla Walla (/ˌwɑːlə ˈwɑːlə/ WAH-lə WAH-lə) is a city in and the county seat of Walla Walla County, Washington, United States. It is one of the largest cities in Southeastern Washington with a population of 34,060 at the 2020 census, estimated to have decreased to 33,339 as of 2023. The combined population of the city and its two suburbs, the town of College Place and unincorporated Walla Walla East, is about 45,500. Walla Walla is located near the Palouse and Blue Mountains, approximately 6 miles (9.7 km) from the Oregon border to the south.

The city lies within the historic territory of several Indigenous Northwest Plateau peoples, among which were the Walawalałáma (Walla Walla). The settlement's name, Walla Walla, is derived from a Nez Perce word for "place of many waters". The Lewis and Clark Expedition reached the Walla Walla Valley in 1806 and were followed by a trading post founded by the Hudson's Bay Company in 1818. The Whitman Mission was established in 1836 and closed after a massacre at the site in 1847. The modern settlement of Walla Walla was founded as Steptoeville in 1856 around Fort Walla Walla and incorporated as a city on January 11, 1862. Walla Walla became the most populous city in Washington Territory but was later eclipsed in the 1880s, remaining a regional hub.

Walla Walla is home to the Washington State Penitentiary, Whitman College, and Marcus Whitman Hotel. The surrounding area has a significant agricultural industry, including a wine-growing region with over 120 wineries. The city is located on U.S. Route 12, a major regional highway, and has a commercial airport.

== History ==
=== Native history and early settlement ===
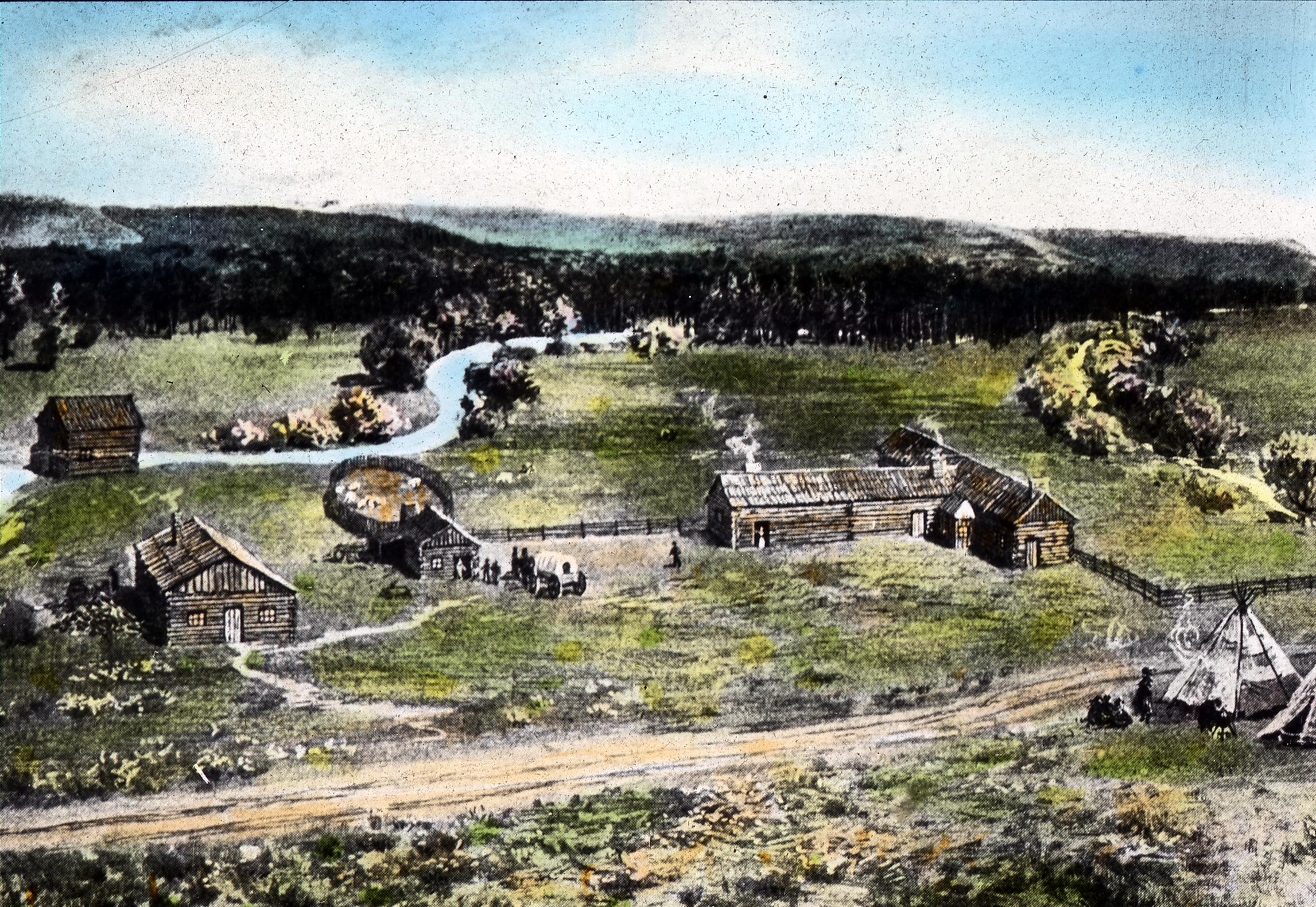
Old Mission, Waiilatpu

Walla Walla's history starts in 1806 when the Lewis and Clark Expedition encountered the Walawalałáma (Walla Walla people) near the mouth of Walla Walla River. Other inhabitants of the valley included the Liksiyu (Cayuse), Imatalamłáma (Umatilla), and Niimíipu (Nez Perce) indigenous peoples. In 1818, Fort Walla Walla (originally Fort Nez Percés), a fur trading outpost run by Hudson's Bay Company (HBC), was established and operated as an important stopping point in Oregon Country. Abandoned in 1855, it is now underwater behind the McNary Dam.

On October 16, 1836, after news of a Nez Perce (Note: Some sources say that Flathead (Bitterroot Salish) delegates were sent, but the Nez Perce tribe has claimed all four delegates as belonging to their tribes. It has been suggested that "Flathead" was being used to describe the Nez Perce appearance, rather than the tribe.) expedition to learn about Christianity and a deal was brokered between the Cayuse people for the use of the Waiilatpu region, Calvinist missionaries Marcus and Narcissa Whitman established the Whitman Mission. A deep distrust of the settlers was cultivated between the Cayuse and the settlers as the Whitmans struggled to convert the natives, failed to fulfill promises, and shifted their focus to whites passing through along the Oregon Trail. In 1847, following a deadly measles outbreak, and reports of the Whitmans poisoning the Cayuse, the Whitmans were warned to leave the area because of the Cayuse custom of killing medicine men whose patients died. They refused to leave, and were killed by the Cayuse, along with 12 others. The site was later designated as Whitman National Monument, a National Historic Site.

Catholic missionaries also arrived in the 1840s, and the Catholic ceremonies resonated with the tribe. On July 24, 1846, Pope Pius IX established the Diocese of Walla Walla. Augustin-Magloire Blanchet was appointed the first Bishop of Walla Walla, but fled shortly after the Whitman massacre. The Diocese of Walla Walla is now a titular see held by Witold Mroziewski, an auxiliary bishop of Brooklyn, New York.

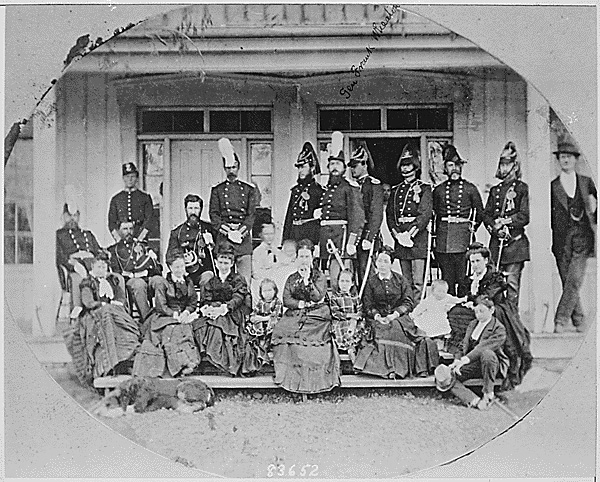
Fort Walla Walla, 1874

In 1855, the Walla Walla Treaty Council was held at Waiilatpu between the Washington Territorial Assembly and the tribal leaders of the surrounding area. Despite the indigenous people citing Tamanwit (natural law), the following year the natives agreed to surrender millions of acres of land for a native reservation and $150,000. The Umatilla Indian Reservation's boundaries eventually shrunk to less than 200,000 acres (81,000 ha).

=== Founding ===
The Walla Walla treaty remained unratified for four years, during which time the conflict between the natives and settlers was increasing due to frontiersmen encroaching on the promised reservation and the Walla Walla and Umatilla peoples' refusal to move to the Umatilla Indian Reservation. The United States Army established a presence in a series of military forts beginning in 1856. A community named "Steptoeville" grew around Fort Walla Walla, named for Lieutenant Colonel Edward Steptoe, and later his name was bestowed upon Steptoe, Washington. The fort has since been restored with a museum about the early settlers' lives.

Growth in the region was limited due to a ban on immigration to the area due to the constant warring with the natives from the Department of the Pacific's General John Ellis Wool, who was sympathetic to the natives. In 1858, the department was split, leaving Washington territory under the command of General William S. Harney, who lifted the ban on October 31, 1858. Thousands of pioneers swarmed to the area, creating a burgeoning farming and mining community.

On March 15, 1859, Walla Walla county held its first county commission and election in the community's first church, St. Patrick's Church, which still serves as the city's parish. Following the ratification of the Walla Walla treaty, the commission voted to name the settlement Walla Walla, on November 17, 1859 and the military carried out the forced displacement of the remaining natives, under the threat of hanging.

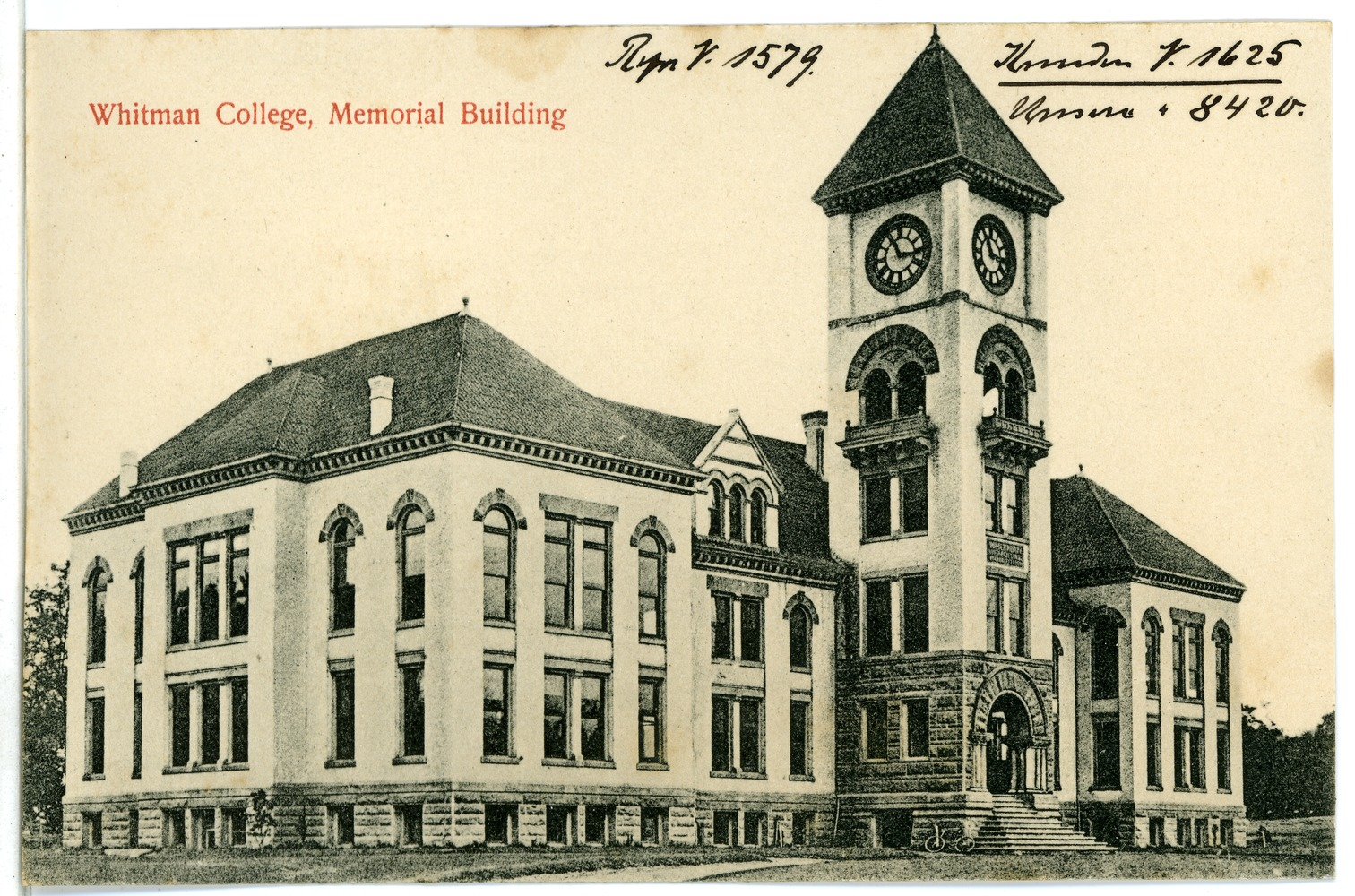
Whitman College, Memorial Building, 1906

On December 20, 1859, the first educational charter was granted to Whitman Seminary, a high school, which opened on October 15, 1866. In 1882, the institution's name was changed to Whitman College, and the legislature issued a new educational charter as a four-year private college.

The Mullan Road, the first wagon road to cross the Rocky Mountains into the Pacific Northwest, tied Walla Walla to more mining opportunities, and after gold was discovered in 1860, the area became the outfitting point for the Oro Fino, Idaho mines. The nearest part of the road followed the modern approximate path from Spokane to Walla Walla via Interstate 90, U.S. Route 195, and U.S. Route 12. The population swelled due to the gold rush, resulting in an unsuccessful proposal to Congress to split Walla Walla from Washington into its own territory.

=== Gold rush and growth ===
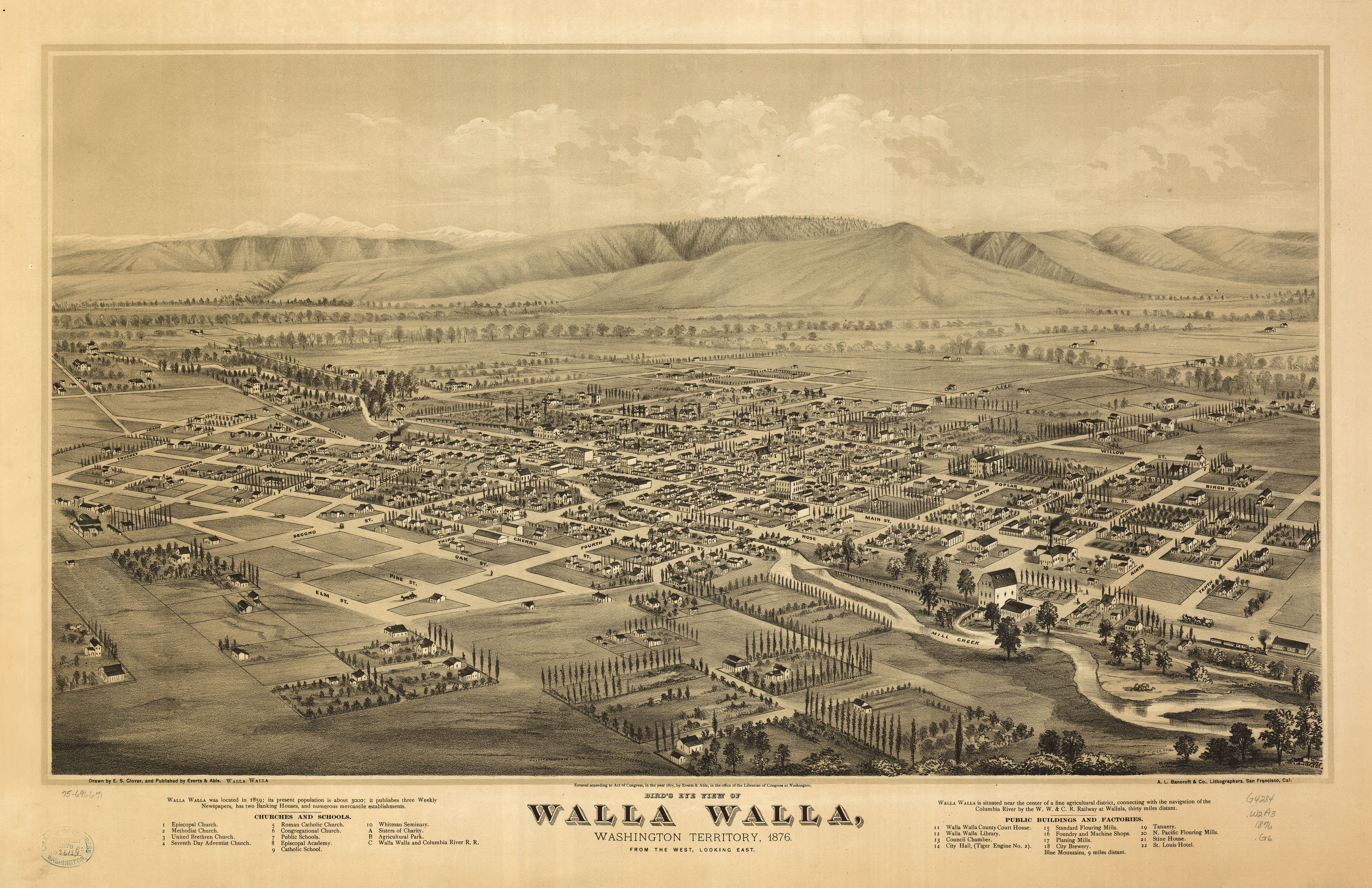
Bird's eye view of Walla Walla, Washington Territory, 1876

Walla Walla was incorporated on January 11, 1862. The first election was held on April 1, 1862, and Judge Elias Bean Whitman, Marcus Whitman's cousin, was elected as the city's first mayor. The population exploded over the following decade, increasing by 300%, making it the most populous city in the territory, slating it to be the capital until cities surpassed it again, after it was bypassed by the transcontinental rail lines in the 1880s.

During the 1860s, the city established its first businesses and community gathering spaces, a number of which served as the first in Pacific Northwest. The city's first newspaper was one of the first between Missouri and the Cascades, the Washington Statesman, was founded in 1861. The first bank, Baker Boyer Bank, was the first in the state, was founded in 1869 by one of the city's first council members, Dorsey Syng Baker and his brother-in-law John Franklin Boyer, and as of March 2022, still served as the oldest bank in state. The Pioneer Meat Market, run by partners John Dooley and William Kirkman, was opened during this time and remained there until they sold it to Christopher Ennis in 1882 and founded the Walla Walla Dressed Meat Company.

One of the first brick buildings in the city was also Walla Walla's first store, Schwabacher Brothers Store on Main street, which served as the city's grocer, builder supply, and clothes shop. Sigmond Schwabacher, one of the brothers, also served in the city's council. The city's first book store was opened in 1864, and an academic community formed around the city's book collection as the Calliopean Society and later incorporated as the Walla Walla Library Association. The city also had one of the region's first breweries, Emil Meyer's City Brewery, that also served as a bakery. Downtown also hosted a post office, several hotels, restaurants, a bathhouse and shaving saloon, a liquor store, a drugstore, and several manufactories.

During the gold rush, large populations of Chinese settlers arrived in the city from Portland, Oregon, creating a neighborhood referred to as "Chinatown". The Chinese settlers mainly worked in commerce, mining, and railroad contracts. After Mullan was unable to lobby the state to make Walla Walla a major railroad stop, and a fire in Chinatown destroyed most of the neighborhood, the immigrants left to find work elsewhere, including Eng Ah King, who was informally known as the "mayor of Chinatown" for revitalizing Seattle's Chinatown.

In 1886, while Washington was lobbying for statehood, local business man Levi Ankeny donated 160 acres of land to the city to serve as the site of a new prison. Legislators approved the site, and in 1887, the state began transferring prisoners to the Washington Territorial Prison from Saatco Prison, a privately owned facility that was shut down in 1888 because of its poor living conditions. The first inmate was a local, William Murphy, who was serving an 18-year sentence for manslaughter. There have been many prison escapes attempted in the prison's history. In 1887, the prison took in its first woman inmate, and had to improvise accommodations until a separate facility was built nearby. When Washington became a state in 1889, the facility officially became the Washington State Penitentiary, but inmates nicknamed it "The Hill", "The Joint", "The Walls", and "The Pen".

=== Agricultural center ===
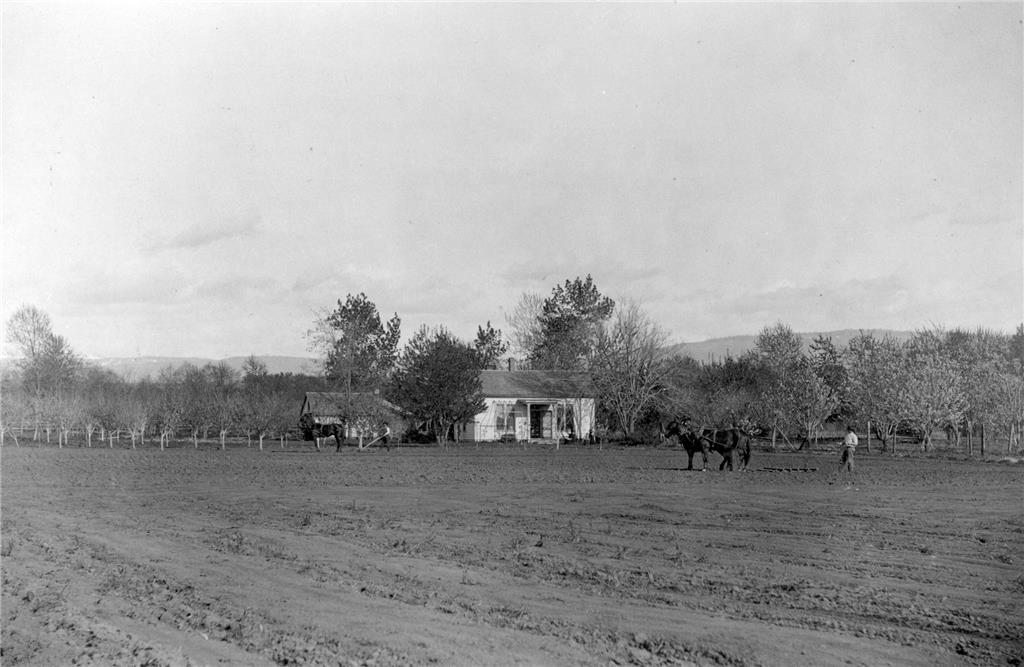
Fruit farm and vineyard, 1890s

As the gold rush died out, the city developed into an agricultural center referred to as the "cradle of Pacific Northwest history", and the "garden city", a popular source for onions, apples, peas, and wine grapes.

Italian settlers from Lonate Pozzolo and Calabria regions formed the core of the gardening industry, and settled in neighborhoods known as "Blalock" and the "South Ninth". One of the main contributions of the Italians to Walla Walla commerce was their vineyards, and soon after, wine tasting rooms, the first two opened in the 1880s by Frank Orselli and Pasquale Saturno. The Italian Walla Walla population was also responsible for growing Washington State's official vegetable, the Walla Walla sweet onion.

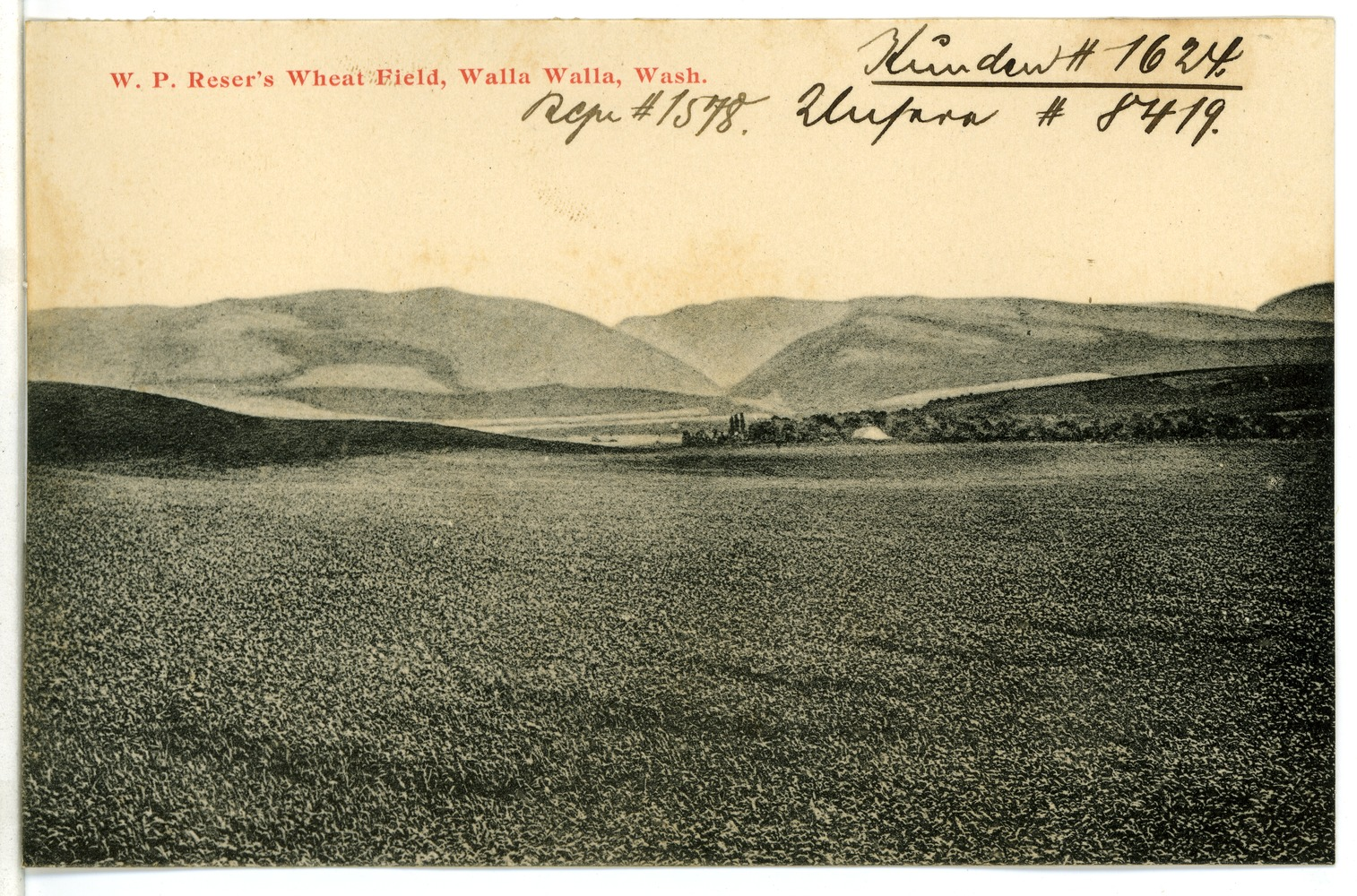
Wheat field, Walla Walla, 1906

It was the technique of dryland farming, though, that made Walla Walla the region's breadbasket known for its wheat exports. The cultivating of grains brought hundreds of Seventh-day Adventists (SDA) to the city, building Walla Walla College and the Walla Walla Sanitarium. The SDA population was followed by hundreds of Volga Germans, whose Old Lutheran and Mennonite religions were connected to SDA in Prussia. The immigrants had relied on dryland farming of wheat crops in Volgograd, Russia. The neighborhood built around the Russian-German immigrants is known as "Germantown" or "Russische Ecke (Russian Corner)" to locals, referring to the creek that runs through it as "Little Volga". The area around Walla Walla College eventually incorporated as its own city, College Place, Washington.

German immigrants also grew hops and the city was home to several breweries. By the 1890s, wine, beer, liquor, and tobacco taxes accounted for 90% of the city's revenue, but the alcohol industries died out with Prohibition in the United States.

As the city became dependent on its wheat production, merchants in the town financed a railroad to Wallula, Washington, to connect Walla Walla to the Columbia River, completed in 1875.

=== 20th century ===
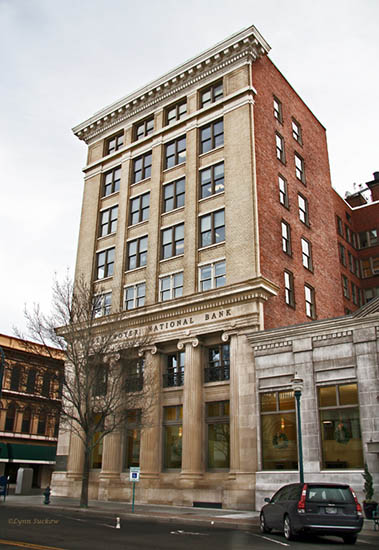
Baker Boyer Bank building, built in 1911

In 1911, Walla Walla adopted a mayor–council government referred to as a "commission" form of government. In 1954, after Sunnyside, Washington adopted another form of government, council–manager government, voted down a change to council-manager, but on November 4, 1959, the city's residents voted to adopt the government form.

Walla Walla's second movie theater, American Theater, opened in 1917 showing The Law of Compensation, a Selznick Pictures film starring Norma Talmadge. The theater later was sold and renamed to Liberty, and eventually became a department store around the 1930s. In 1990, became Walla Walla's first privately renovated building as a Bon-Macy's. Bon-Macy's parent company, Federated Department Stores, rebranded all of its subsidiaries to Macy's, which operated in the Liberty building until 2020.

In 1927, the Real Estate Improvement Company of Seattle invested $300,000 toward the construction of the Marcus Whitman Hotel. The 174-room hotel was designed by Sherwood D. Ford and opened in 1928. It fell into disrepair in the 1960s, until it was restored in 1999 and reopened in 2001. As of March 2022, the hotel was still open.

Mill Creek overflowed into Walla Walla and College Place on March 31, 1931, causing $1 million in damages. Community volunteers jury-rigged makeshift levees to divert water from buildings during the cleanup which cost roughly $100,000. The United States Army Corps of Engineers built the Mill Creek Dam and Bennington Lake in response to the disaster. The dam and lake were instrumental in preventing damage from flooding in 1964, 1996, and 2020.

During the Great Depression, a Canadian import duty cut off the main market for Walla Walla's fresh agriculture. John Grant Kelly, who owned the Walla Walla Union-Bulletin at the time, opened the area's first cannery, Walla Walla Canning Company. In 1939, Walla Walla produced roughly $5 million of the country's $30 million canned green pea industry, and TIME magazine referred to Kelly as the "Father of Peas". Kelly also owned Church Grape Juice Company, a concord grape farm in Kennewick, Washington. Workers went on strike for better wages in September 1949, and Kelly had two employees arrested for speaking to the Tri-City Herald. Church was one of four juice companies in the region to be charged with violations of the Sherman Antitrust Act of 1890 for price-fixing grapes. Welch's bought Church from Kelly in 1952.

In 1936, Walla Walla and surrounding areas were struck by the magnitude 6.1 State Line earthquake. Residents reported hearing a moderate rumbling immediately before the shock. There was significant damage in the area, and aftershocks were felt for several months following.

in the 1970s and 1980s, Leonetti Cellar, Woodward Canyon, L'Ecole 41, Waterbrook Winery and Seven Hills Winery pioneered a resurgence of Walla Walla's viticulture.

In 1997, Gary Johnson founded the first brewery in Walla Walla since prohibition, Mill Creek Brewpub.

=== 21st century ===
In 2001, Walla Walla was a Great American Main Street Award winner for the transformation and preservation of its once dilapidated main street. In July 2011, USA Today selected Walla Walla as the friendliest small city in the United States. Walla Walla was also named Friendliest Small Town in America the same year as part of Rand McNally's annual Best of the Road contest. In 2012 and 2013, Walla Walla was a runner-up in the best food category for the Best of the Road. Downtown Walla Walla was awarded a Great Places in America Great Neighborhood designation in 2012 by the American Planning Association.

In the 2010s, Walla Walla's brewery industry experienced a revival. The first hops farms since prohibition were planted in 2018, and in 2019, Washington State Department of Corrections announced a plan to bring a vineyard and hopyard to Washington State Penitentiary, along with agricultural science education to prepare inmates for careers in the field. The program would offer inmates state-wide minimum wages, a practice only legally enforced by state law at private institutions. The city hosted its first beer festival in February 2020.

In 2017, and annually, Walla Walla's mayor signed a proclamation making the third Saturday of September "Adam West Day", to honor the actor, who was born and raised in the city. In 2020, the event was cancelled due to the COVID-19 pandemic, but the organizers announced that the city approved the erection of a statue in West's honor and a GoFundMe fundraiser to cover the costs of the statue. The statue will be placed in Menlo Park on Alvarado Terrace, part of Historic Downtown Walla Walla.

== Etymology ==
Walla Walla is Nez Perce for "Place of Many Waters", because the original settlement was at the junction of the Snake and Columbia rivers.

Tourists to Walla Walla are often told that it is a "town so nice they named it twice". The slogan was coined by Al Jolson, who had visited the city in the early 1900s in The Keylor Grand Theater. He had also said the same of New York, New York. The quote referring to Walla Walla was in The Jolson Story, a musical about the entertainer's life.

Some locals and Walla Walla natives often refer to the city in text form with "W2".

== Geography and climate ==
Climate chart for Walla Walla

Walla Walla is located in the Walla Walla Valley, with the rolling Palouse hills to the north and the Blue Mountains to the east of town. Various creeks meander through town before combining to become the Walla Walla River, which drains into the Columbia River about 30 miles (50 km) west of town. The city lies in the rain shadow of the Cascade Mountains, so annual precipitation is fairly low.

According to the United States Census Bureau, the city has a total area of 12.84 square miles (33.26 km^{2}), of which 12.81 square miles (33.18 km^{2}) is land and 0.03 square miles (0.08 km^{2}) is water.

Walla Walla has a hot-summer Mediterranean climate according to the Köppen climate classification system (Köppen: Csa; Trewartha: Doak). It is one of the northernmost locations in North America to qualify as having such a climate. In contrast to most other locations having this climate type in North America, Walla Walla can experience fairly cold winter conditions, though they are still relatively mild for its latitude and inland location.

Climate data for Walla Walla, Washington (Walla Walla Regional Airport), 1991–2020 normals, extremes 1949–present
Month	Jan	Feb	Mar	Apr	May	Jun	Jul	Aug	Sep	Oct	Nov	Dec	Year
Record high °F (°C)	70 (21)	75 (24)	79 (26)	96 (36)	100 (38)	116 (47)	114 (46)	114 (46)	104 (40)	89 (32)	81 (27)	71 (22)	116 (47)
Mean maximum °F (°C)	61.3 (16.3)	62.0 (16.7)	69.8 (21.0)	78.1 (25.6)	88.9 (31.6)	97.0 (36.1)	104.2 (40.1)	102.3 (39.1)	92.5 (33.6)	79.0 (26.1)	66.6 (19.2)	61.0 (16.1)	105.7 (40.9)
Mean daily maximum °F (°C)	41.9 (5.5)	46.5 (8.1)	55.8 (13.2)	62.5 (16.9)	71.4 (21.9)	79.0 (26.1)	90.1 (32.3)	88.6 (31.4)	78.5 (25.8)	63.4 (17.4)	49.2 (9.6)	41.0 (5.0)	64.0 (17.8)
Daily mean °F (°C)	36.3 (2.4)	39.7 (4.3)	46.8 (8.2)	52.5 (11.4)	60.4 (15.8)	67.0 (19.4)	76.3 (24.6)	75.2 (24.0)	66.2 (19.0)	53.9 (12.2)	43.9 (6.6)	35.6 (2.0)	54.3 (12.4)
Mean daily minimum °F (°C)	30.7 (−0.7)	32.9 (0.5)	37.8 (3.2)	42.5 (5.8)	49.3 (9.6)	55.1 (12.8)	62.4 (16.9)	61.7 (16.5)	53.9 (12.2)	43.9 (6.6)	35.6 (2.0)	30.2 (−1.0)	44.7 (7.1)
Mean minimum °F (°C)	16.3 (−8.7)	20.2 (−6.6)	26.8 (−2.9)	32.3 (0.2)	37.9 (3.3)	45.4 (7.4)	51.4 (10.8)	50.6 (10.3)	41.8 (5.4)	30.1 (−1.1)	21.7 (−5.7)	15.4 (−9.2)	8.4 (−13.1)
Record low °F (°C)	−18 (−28)	−16 (−27)	4 (−16)	20 (−7)	26 (−3)	36 (2)	40 (4)	42 (6)	32 (0)	15 (−9)	−11 (−24)	−24 (−31)	−24 (−31)
Average precipitation inches (mm)	2.10 (53)	1.59 (40)	2.11 (54)	1.98 (50)	2.07 (53)	1.24 (31)	0.47 (12)	0.40 (10)	0.64 (16)	1.66 (42)	2.25 (57)	2.23 (57)	18.74 (476)
Average snowfall inches (cm)	1.0 (2.5)	2.2 (5.6)	0.2 (0.51)	0.0 (0.0)	0.0 (0.0)	0.0 (0.0)	0.0 (0.0)	0.0 (0.0)	0.0 (0.0)	0.1 (0.25)	0.3 (0.76)	2.7 (6.9)	6.5 (17)
Average precipitation days (≥ 0.01 in)	13.3	11.2	12.1	11.1	9.8	7.1	2.7	2.5	3.8	8.8	13.1	13.6	109.1
Average snowy days (≥ 0.1 in)	2.3	1.5	0.3	0.0	0.0	0.0	0.0	0.0	0.0	0.1	0.5	2.4	7.1
Mean monthly sunshine hours	50.5	83.4	173.8	221.7	288.5	326.3	384.5	344.4	268.8	199.2	67.8	40.3	2,449.2
Percentage possible sunshine	18	29	47	54	62	69	81	79	71	59	24	15	51
Source: NOAA (sun 1961–1987)

== Demographics ==
Historical population
Census	Pop.	Note	%±
1870	1,394		—
1880	3,588		157.4%
1890	4,709		31.2%
1900	10,049		113.4%
1910	19,364		92.7%
1920	15,503		−19.9%
1930	15,976		3.1%
1940	18,109		13.4%
1950	24,102		33.1%
1960	24,536		1.8%
1970	23,619		−3.7%
1980	25,618		8.5%
1990	26,478		3.4%
2000	29,686		12.1%
2010	31,731		6.9%
2020	34,060		7.3%
2024 (est.)	33,901		−0.5%
U.S. Decennial Census; 2020 Census

=== 2020 census ===
As of the 2020 census, Walla Walla had a population of 34,060. The median age was 38.3 years; 19.9% of residents were under the age of 18 and 19.2% of residents were 65 years of age or older. For every 100 females there were 107.2 males, and for every 100 females age 18 and over there were 108.8 males age 18 and over.

100.0% of residents lived in urban areas, while 0.0% lived in rural areas.

There were 12,601 households in Walla Walla, of which 27.6% had children under the age of 18 living in them. Of all households, 41.1% were married-couple households, 20.7% were households with a male householder and no spouse or partner present, and 30.5% were households with a female householder and no spouse or partner present. About 33.6% of all households were made up of individuals and 15.3% had someone living alone who was 65 years of age or older.

There were 13,571 housing units, of which 7.1% were vacant. The homeowner vacancy rate was 1.0% and the rental vacancy rate was 6.9%.

Racial composition as of the 2020 census
Race	Number	Percent
White	24,036	70.6%
Black or African American	795	2.3%
American Indian and Alaska Native	436	1.3%
Asian	621	1.8%
Native Hawaiian and Other Pacific Islander	65	0.2%
Some other race	3,878	11.4%
Two or more races	4,229	12.4%
Hispanic or Latino (of any race)	8,290	24.3%

=== 2010 census ===
As of the 2010 census, there were 31,731 people, 11,537 households, and 6,834 families residing in the city. The population density was 2,477.0 inhabitants per square mile (956.4/km^{2}). There were 12,514 housing units at an average density of 976.9 per square mile (377.2/km^{2}). The racial makeup of the city was 81.6% White, 2.7% African American, 1.3% Native American, 1.4% Asian, 0.3% Pacific Islander, 9.1% from other races, and 3.6% from two or more races. Hispanic or Latino residents of any race were 22.0% of the population.

There were 11,537 households, of which 30.4% had children under the age of 18 living with them, 42.6% were married couples living together, 12.0% had a female householder with no husband present, 4.7% had a male householder with no wife present, and 40.8% were other forms of households. 33.4% of all households were made up of individuals, and 14.2% had someone living alone who was 65 years of age or older. The average household size was 2.43 and the average family size was 3.10.

The median age in the city was 34.4 years. 22% of residents were under the age of 18; 14.5% were between the ages of 18 and 24; 26.2% were from 25 to 44; 23.1% were from 45 to 64; and 14% were 65 years of age or older. The gender makeup of the city was 51.9% male and 48.1% female.

== Economy ==
=== Agriculture ===
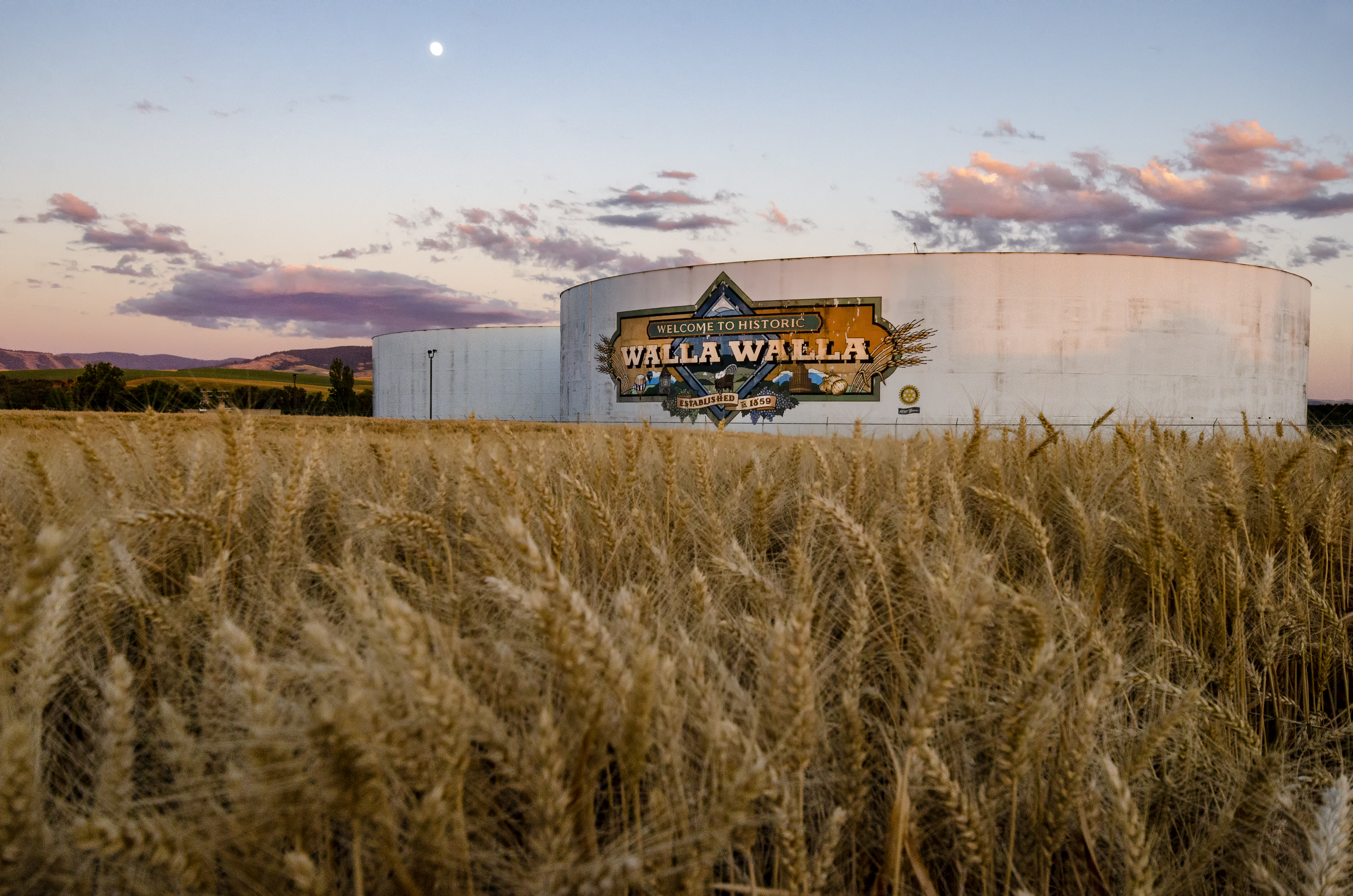
A wheat field in Walla Walla, Washington

Though wheat is still a significant crop, vineyards and wineries have become economically important over the last three decades. In summer 2020, there were over 120 wineries in the greater Walla Walla area. Following the wine boom, the town has developed several fine dining establishments and luxury hotels. The Marcus Whitman Hotel, originally opened in 1928, was renovated with original fixtures and furniture. It is the tallest building in the city, at 13 stories.

Walla Walla Farmers Market

The Walla Walla Sweet Onion and the Great Grape are a few crops with a rich tradition. Over a century ago on the Island of Corsica, off the west coast of Italy, a French soldier named Peter Pieri found an Italian sweet onion seed and brought it to the Walla Walla Valley. Impressed by the new onion's winter hardiness, Pieri, and the Italian immigrant farmers who comprised much of Walla Walla's gardening industry, harvested the seed.

The sweet onion developed over several generations through the process of selecting onions from each year's crop, targeting sweetness, size and round shape. The Walla Walla Sweet Onion is designated under federal law as a protected agricultural crop. In 2007 the Walla Walla Sweet Onion became Washington's official state vegetable. There is also a Walla Walla Sweet Onion Festival, held annually in July. Walla Walla Sweet Onions have low sulfur content (about half that of an ordinary yellow onion) and are 90 percent water.

Walla Walla currently has two farmers markets, both held from May until October. The first is located on the corner of 4th and Main, and is coordinated by the Downtown Walla Walla Foundation. The other is at the Walla Walla County Fairgrounds on S. Ninth Ave, run by the Walla Walla Valley Farmer's Market.

=== Wine industry ===
Walla Walla has experienced an expansion in its wine industry in recent decades, culminating in the area being named "Best Wine Region" in USA Today's Reader Choice Awards in both 2020 and 2021. Several local wineries have received top scores from wine publications such as Wine Spectator, The Wine Advocate and Wine and Spirits. Although most of the early recognition went to the wines made from Merlot and Cabernet, Syrah is fast becoming a star varietal in this appellation. Overall, there are more than 120 wineries in the Walla Walla area, which collectively generate over $100 million for the valley annually.

Walla Walla Community College offers an associate degree (AAAS) in winemaking and grape growing through its Center for Enology and Viticulture, which operates its own commercial winery, College Cellars.

One challenge to growing grapes in Walla Walla Valley is the risk of a killing freeze during the winter. On average these happen once every six or seven years; the penultimate occurrence (in 2004) destroyed about 75% of the wine grape crop in the valley. In November 2010 the valley was again hit with a killing frost, leading to a 28% decline in Cabernet Sauvignon production, a 20% decline in red grape production, and an overall decline in production of 11% (red and white varietals).

=== Corrections industry ===
The second-largest prison in Washington, after nearby Coyote Ridge Corrections Center in Connell, is the Washington State Penitentiary (WSP) located in Walla Walla, at 1313 North 13th. Originally opened in 1886, it now houses about 2,000 offenders. In addition, there are about 1000 staff members. In 2005, the financial benefit to the local economy was estimated to be about $55 million through salaries, medical services, utilities, and local purchases. In 2014, the penitentiary underwent an extensive expansion project to increase the prison capacity to 2,500 violent offenders and double the staff size.

Until October 11, 2018, Washington was a death penalty state, and occasional executions took place at the state penitentiary; the last execution took place on September 10, 2010. Washington was also one of the last two states to allow hanging as a choice when sentenced to death (the other being New Hampshire); there has not been a hanging since May 1994 (the default method of execution was changed to lethal injection in 1996). Washington was the last state with an active gallows. 80 executions were carried out at the prison between 1904 and 2010.

The most notable inmate has been Gary Ridgway, a serial killer known as the "Green River killer", who was still incarcerated there as of November 2021.

== Arts and culture ==
=== Fine and performing arts ===
The Walla Walla Valley boasts a number of fine and performing arts organizations and venues.

- The Walla Walla Valley Bands were formed in 1989 and currently boasts a Concert Band of more than 70 and two Jazz Ensembles. The group rehearses weekly on Tuesday nights at the Walla Walla Valley Adventist Academy in nearby College Place.
- The Walla Walla Symphony began in 1907 and performs six to eight concerts from October – May. Its primary performance venue is Cordiner Hall on the campus of Whitman College. Other performance venues include the Gesa Power House Theatre and Walla Walla University Church.
- The Walla Walla Chamber Music Festival is held twice a year and features guest musical ensembles playing classical chamber music in various small venues throughout town. The summer festival includes performances for almost the whole month of June. The winter festival is a small-scale version of the summer program, it is held in mid-January.
- Shakespeare Walla Walla is a non-profit organization that hosts a summer Shakespeare festival in Walla Walla. They often bring Shakespeare troupes from Seattle and elsewhere to perform about four plays per year. In the past this was done at the Fort Walla Walla Amphitheater, but more recently at the GESA Powerhouse Theatre.
- The GESA Powerhouse Theatre opened in 2011 in Walla Walla; it was originally the Walla Walla gas plant, hence its name. Its dimensions closely resemble the Blackfriars Theatre once used by William Shakespeare. The venue is used by Shakespeare Walla Walla as well as host to various concerts and other performing arts events throughout the year.
- The Little Theatre of Walla Walla began in 1944 and moved into its current building on Sumach St. in 1948 where it has performed various plays to this day.
- The Walla Walla Choral Society began in 1980 and performs a season of three or four concerts per year in various locations around the Walla Walla Valley.
- Fort Walla Walla Amphitheater is a disused open-air stage with bench seating on the grounds of the Fort Walla Walla Park, next to Fort Walla Walla Museum. It formerly hosted Shakespeare Walla Walla productions and the Walla Walla Community College Summer Musical.
- The Walla Walla Foundry was founded in 1980.

In addition, the area's three colleges—Whitman College, Walla Walla University and Walla Walla Community College as well as its largest public high school—Walla Walla High School—stage theater and music performances.

=== Sports ===
Walla Walla is home of the Walla Walla Sweets, a summer collegiate baseball team that plays in the West Coast League. The league comprises college players and prospects working towards a professional baseball career. Teams are located in British Columbia, Oregon, Washington and Alberta. Sweets home games have been played at Borleske Stadium in Walla Walla, since their first season in 2010. In only their second season the Sweets played in the WCL Championship game, ultimately losing to the Corvallis Knights. In 2013, the Sweets won their first North Division title with the second best win–loss record in the WCL. The Sweets lost their North Division playoff series to the Wenatchee Applesox that year.

Walla Walla Drag Strip is a 1/8 mile dragstrip west of the Walla Walla Regional Airport. The dragstrip is located on an old runway of the airport. Walla Walla is the location of Tour of Walla Walla, a four-stage road cycling race held annually in April. The races are held in Walla Walla and in the Palouse hills of nearby Waitsburg. The stages include two road races, a time trial, and a criterium race. The annual Walla Walla Marathon takes place in October and includes a full marathon, half-marathon, and 10k race. The full marathon is a Boston Marathon Qualifier. The race route winds through the streets of the city of Walla Walla and the country roads outside of town, often running past several of the region's many estate vineyards.

== Government ==
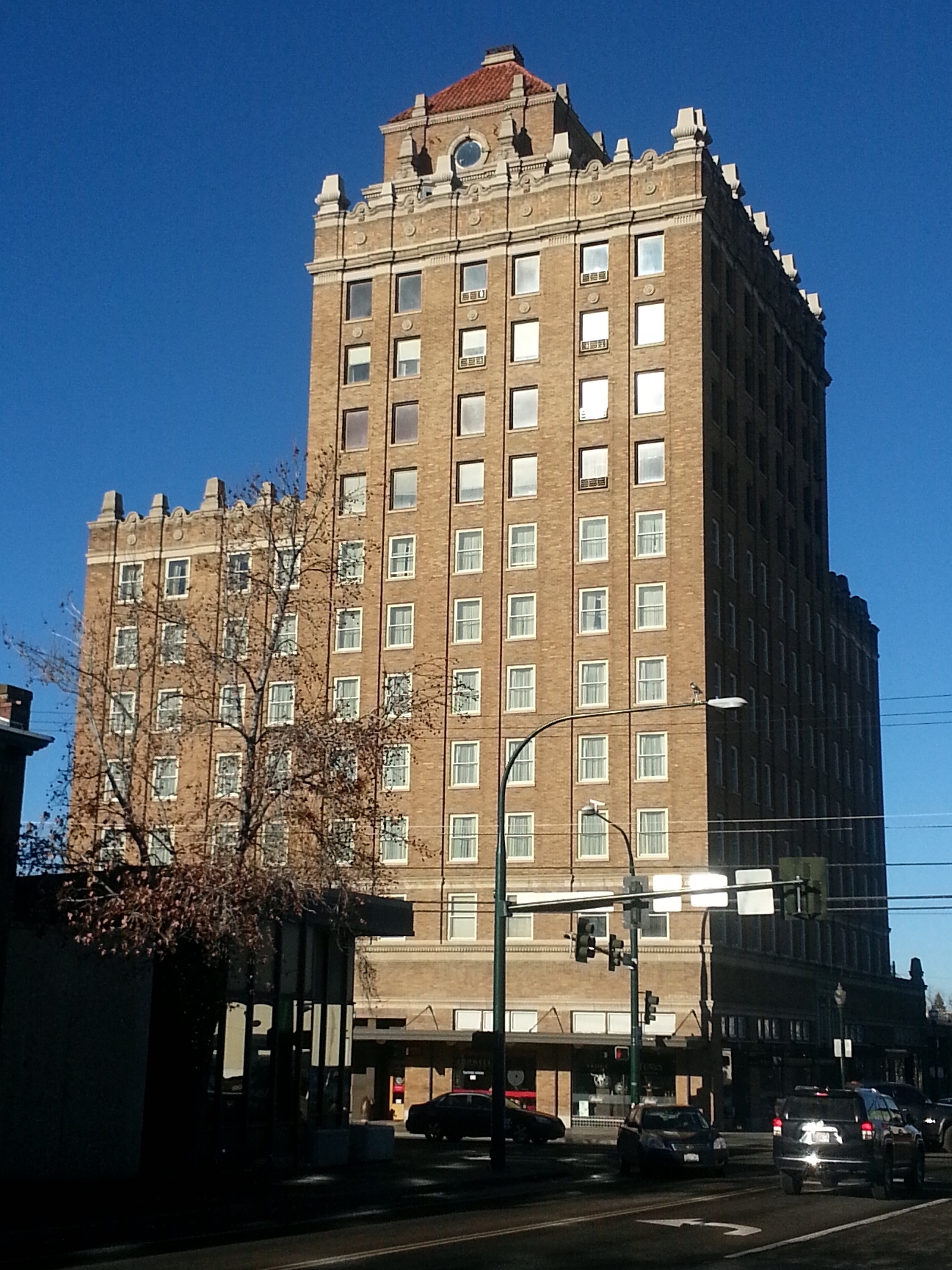
Marcus Whitman Hotel at Rose and Second in the "Great Neighborhood"

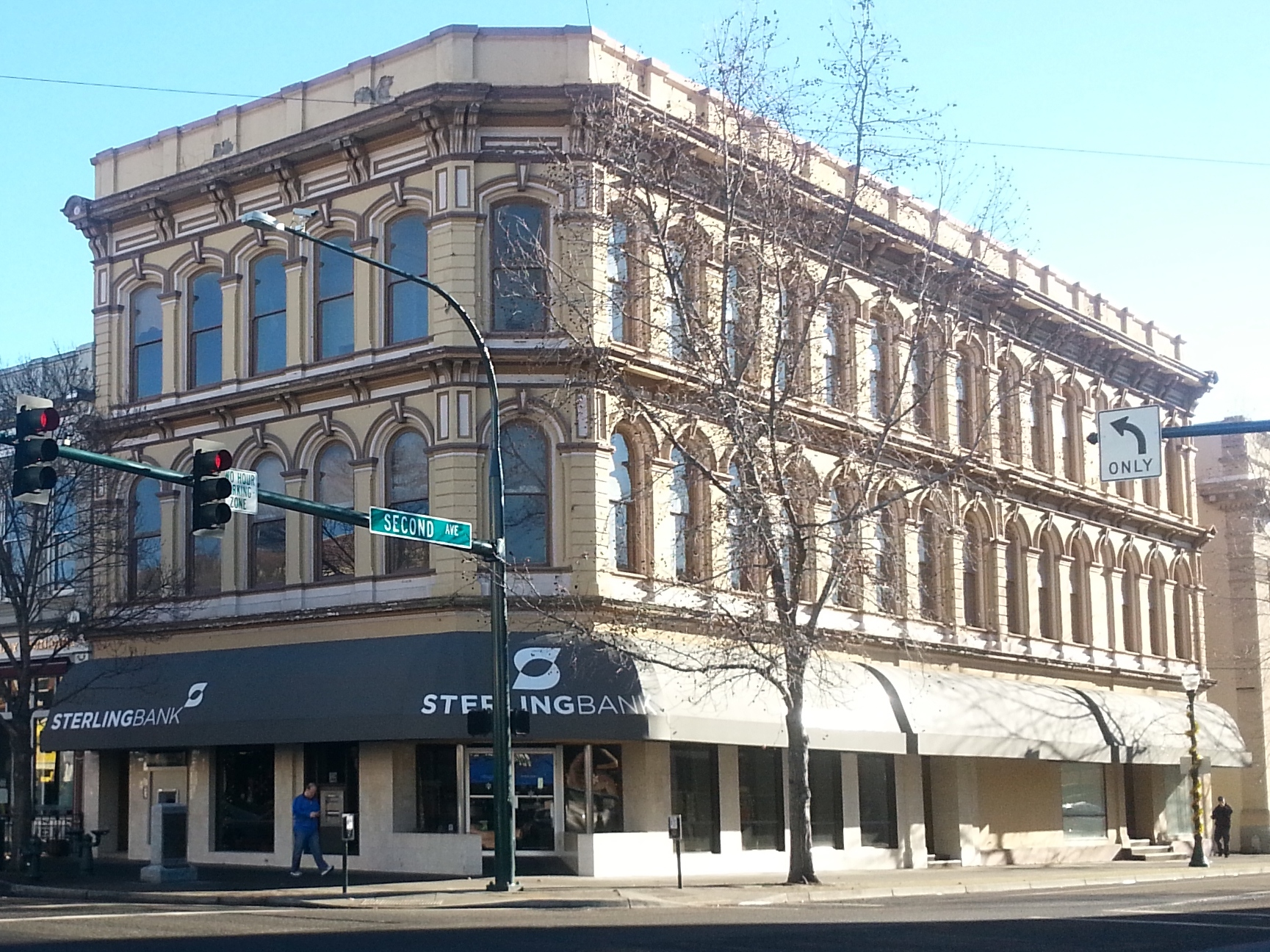
Sterling Bank in one of the renovated buildings in the "Great Neighborhood"

Walla Walla is a code city with a council–manager government. The city council serves as the legislative body and comprises seven members who are elected to four-year terms; three positions are at-large and four are from wards that the city is divided into. The mayor is selected by the city council from among its members and serves a two-year term; since 2026, the mayor has been at-large councilmember Gustavo Reyna. The city council also appoints a city manager who oversees day-to-day operations and administration of the city government.

== Education ==
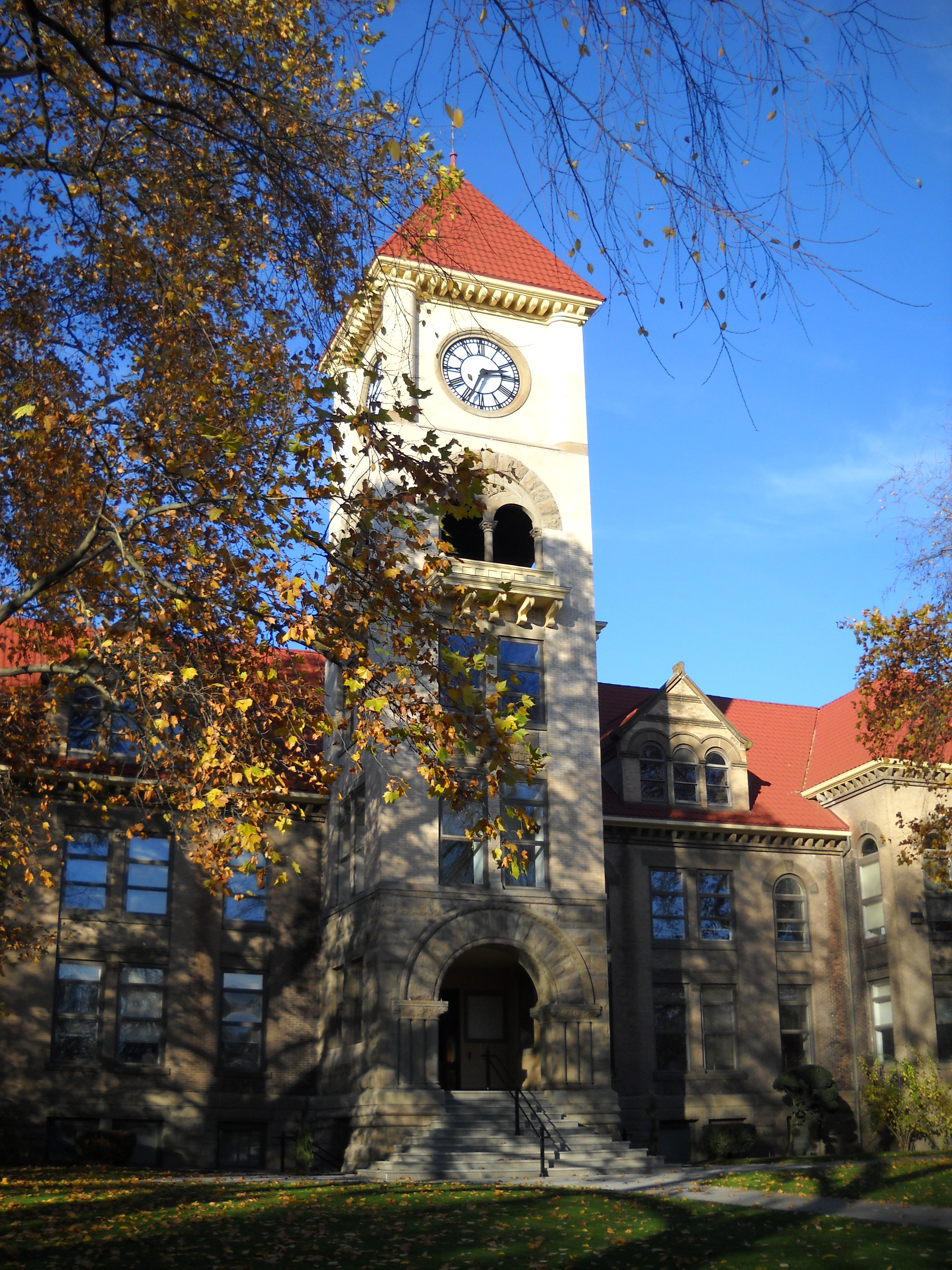
Whitman College Administration Building in fall 2010

Walla Walla Public Schools operates seven elementary schools (one is in Dixie, six of them are K-5 with one of these being PreK-5), two middle schools, one traditional high school (colloquially Wa-Hi), and two alternative high schools (Lincoln and Opportunity). There is also Homelink, an alternative K-8 education program which is a hybrid of homeschooling and public school programs. The district includes most of the city, excluding the extreme western portions of Walla Walla that are in the College Place School District.

There are several private Christian schools in the area. These include:

- The Walla Walla Catholic Schools (Assumption K-8 School and DeSales High School)
- Liberty Christian School, non-denominational
- Rogers Adventist School and Walla Walla Valley Academy, in nearby College Place, both of Seventh-day Adventist affiliation
- Saint Basil Academy of Classical Studies (K-8)

In addition to these, there are three colleges in the area:

- Walla Walla Community College, co-winner of the 2013 Aspen Prize for Community College Excellence
- Whitman College, an independent liberal arts college
- Walla Walla University, in nearby College Place, Washington, affiliated with the Seventh-day Adventist denomination

== Infrastructure ==
=== Transportation ===
The city lies along U.S. Route 12, a major east–west highway that crosses Washington state and connects the region to the Tri-Cities and Clarkston. Since 2003, the Washington State Department of Transportation has expanded U.S. Route 12 into a four-lane divided highway between Pasco and Walla Walla. The eighth section was completed in June 2023. The highway also acts as the main gateway to Interstates 82 and 84, which run to the west and south, respectively. State Route 125 runs through the city, north to State Route 124 in Prescott and south to Milton-Freewater, Oregon, becoming Oregon Highway 11 at the state line. Walla Walla is also served by Columbia-Walla Walla Railway, a shortline freight railroad that uses Union Pacific and Port of Columbia tracks between Wallula, Walla Walla, and Dayton.

Walla Walla and nearby College Place are served by Valley Transit, a local public transit bus service. The system has been fare-free since 2022. Kayak Public Transit, operated by the Confederated Tribes of the Umatilla Indian Reservation, has daily commuter service to Milton-Freewater and Pendleton. Travel Washington's intercity Grape Line travels between Walla Walla and Pasco with a schedule that runs three times a day. Walla Walla Regional Airport has commercial airline service to Seattle–Tacoma International Airport twice a day; a larger hub at Tri-Cities Airport in Pasco serves other destinations.

=== Healthcare ===
Walla Walla is served by two health care institutions: St. Mary Medical Center (part of the Catholic Providence Health System) and the Jonathan M. Wainwright Veteran's Affairs Medical Center on the grounds of the old Fort Walla Walla and World War II training facility.

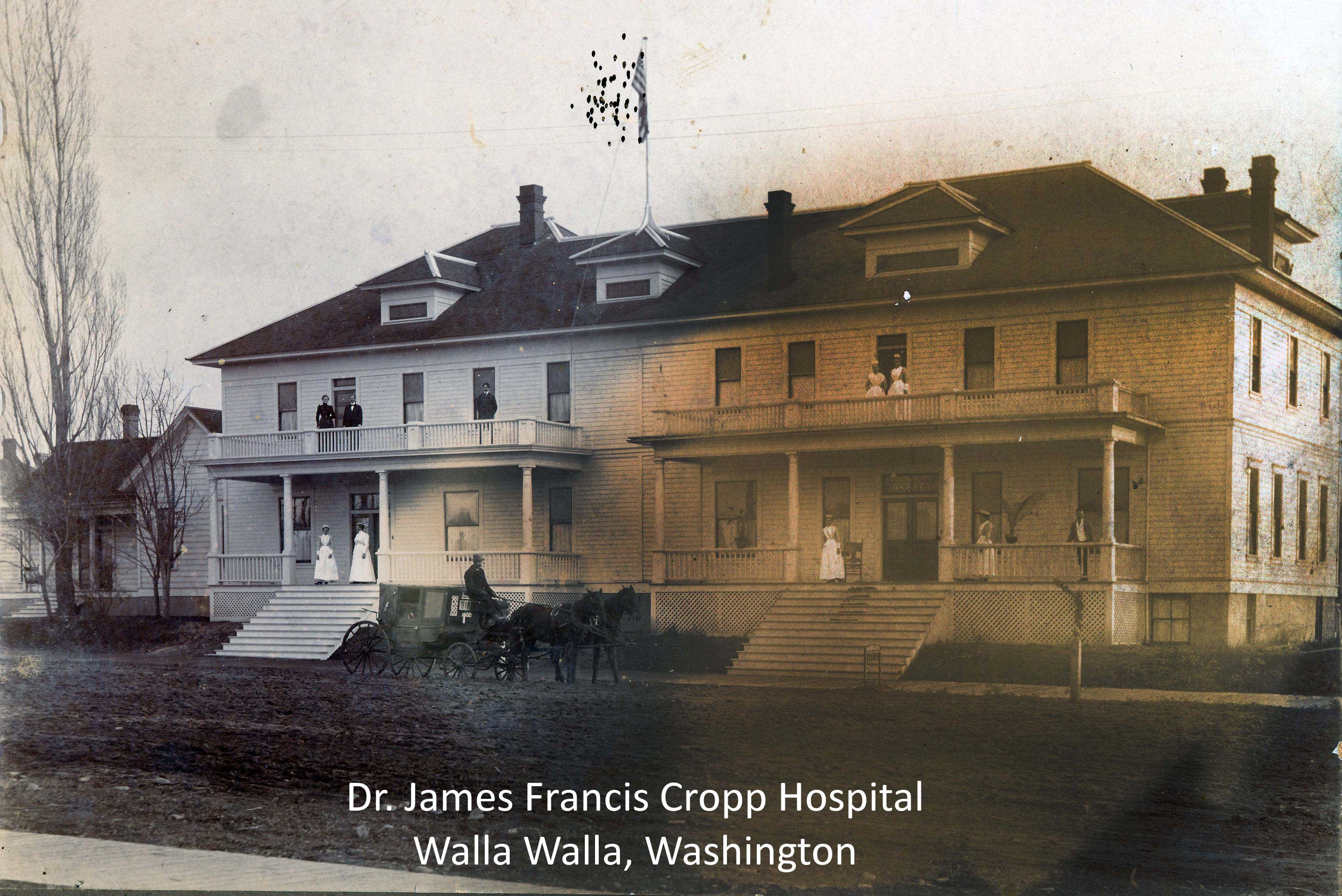
Walla Walla Hospital in 1890

Dr. James F. Cropp (1854–1933) was the promoter and founder of the Walla Walla Hospital built in 1890, which later became the Benveniueu Apartments, named for the old Cropp estate near Fredericksburg, VA. He was the physician and surgeon to the state penitentiary for six years and after the building of the Odd Fellows Home, he also became physician to that institution. Dr. Cropp shared offices for several years with another pioneer physician and philanthropist, Dr. N.G. Blalock. Dr. Cropp was the last Mayor of Walla Walla under the mayor-council system before the city was changed to a commission government. Dr. Cropp's original two-story mansion still exists at 403 E. Rose St. as of 2025 made from the Tenino, WA stone quarry. His family came to Washington in 1872, making it westward to American Falls, Idaho, driving a team of oxen. Dr. James Francis Cropp's brother, Wilber Fisk Cropp, was a Baker County, Oregon Commissioner (1908 Baker County Courthouse Cornerstone). Further biographical Dr. Cropp information, see Reference Number:

== In popular culture ==
Walla Walla is the location of the treasure in Cash and Carry, a short 1937 film starring The Three Stooges. In the Looney Tunes 1963 short Transylvania 6-5000, "Walla Walla, Washington" is a magic word that can transform Count Bloodcount. "Walla Walla" was also a nickname for the right-field wall at the Kingdome, when the Seattle Mariners played there.

== Sister cities ==
In 1972, Walla Walla established a sister city relationship with Sasayama (now named Tamba-Sasayama), Japan. The two cities have since named roads after their counterpart sister city. Walla Walla has also hosted exchange students from Tamba-Sasayama since 1994 for a two-week home-stay experience. Yearlong high school student exchanges between the cities have occurred several times in the past. Cultural and art exchanges involving music, dance, and various art mediums have also occurred. The Walla Walla Sister City Committee has been the recipient of the Washington State Sister City Association Peace Prize in 2011 and 2014 for their involvement in promoting peace, cultural understanding and friendship.

== Notable people ==
- Juan Alvarez, soccer player
- Burl Barer, broadcaster and author
- Drew Bledsoe, NFL quarterback
- Richard Arthur Bogle, businessman and rancher
- Walter Brattain, Nobel Prize winner and co-inventor of the transistor
- Robert Brode, physicist
- Wallace R. Brode, scientist
- Sally Buzbee, executive editor of the Washington Post and formerly of the Associated Press
- Robert Clodius, educator and university administrator
- Tonya Cooley, Real World Chicago housemate
- C. Curtis-Smith, composer and pianist
- Alex Deccio, politician, former member of Washington House of Representatives and Senate
- Evelyn Evelyn, baroque pop duo created by Amanda Palmer and Jason Webley
- Eddie Feigner, softball player
- Bert Hadley, actor and makeup artist
- Gladys Ingle, 4th licensed woman pilot in US, wing-walker display performer.
- Alan W. Jones, US Army major general
- Charly Martin, NFL player
- Walt Minnick, U.S. congressman
- Edward P. Morgan, television and newspaper journalist
- Mikha'il Na'ima, writer and philosopher
- David R. Nygren, physicist, inventor of the time projection chamber
- Eric O'Flaherty, MLB player
- Charles Potts, poet and publisher
- Don Roff, novelist, screenwriter, and filmmaker
- Cher Scarlett, software engineer and labor activist
- Hope Summers, actress
- Connor Trinneer, actor
- Jonathan Wainwright, U.S. general
- Ferris Webster, film editor
- Adam West, television and film actor
- Hamza Yusuf, Islamic scholar

== See also ==
- List of reduplicated place names
- Blue Mountain Mall
- 1936 State Line earthquake
