= Baker Boyer Bank =

Bank in Walla Walla, Washington

Baker Boyer National Bank

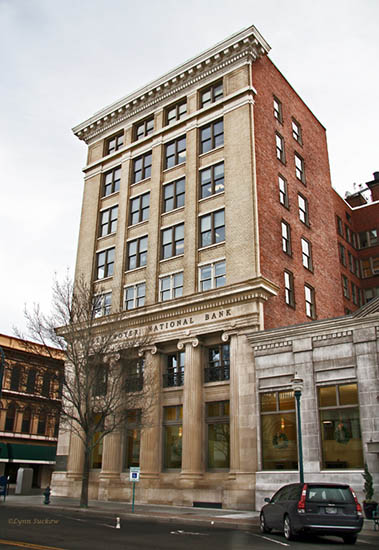
- Baker Boyer Bank main office in Walla Walla, Washington
- Company type: Public (OTC BB: BBBK.OB), family owned and operated
- Industry: Financial services
- Predecessor: Baker Boyer Bancorp
- Founded: Walla Walla, Washington, U.S. (November 10, 1869)
- Founder: Dr. D.S. Baker and John F. Boyer
- Headquarters: Walla Walla, Washington, U.S.
- Number of locations: 7 branches (2015)
- Area served: Southeastern Washington and northeastern Oregon
- Key people: Megan Clubb, Chair, and Mark Kajita, CEO
- Services: Banking; Wealth management
- Number of employees: 180
- Website: www.bakerboyer.com

Baker Boyer National Bank is a Walla Walla, Washington based financial institution. Founded in 1869, it is the first bank in what would become the State of Washington.

It was the first Walla Walla bank to open a branch office. Current bank CEO Mark Kajita is the third non-family president and CEO of the organization and was preceded by Baker Boyer's board chairman, Megan Clubb, a descendant of bank founder Dorsey S. Baker.

In 2010, the bank closed its branch in Weston, Oregon.

The bank building in Walla Walla, built c. 1910, was designed by the Beezer Brothers architectural office in Seattle. It is a seven-story office building with a colonnade of Ionic columns spanning the lower two floors at the front. This building was the first skyscraper in Walla Walla.
