= Jefferson Westside, Eugene, Oregon =

Neighborhood in Eugene

Coordinates: 44°02′46″N 123°06′31″W

Jefferson Westside is a neighborhood in Eugene, Oregon, United States.

== Overview ==
Jefferson Westside is a .912 square mile neighborhood bounded by Chambers, Lawrence and Willamette, 18th Avenue and 7th Avenue. In 2010 had a population of 5,750 people and was named the neighborhood of the year.

The neighborhood is a "biker's paradise and is the third most "walkable" neighborhood in Eugene.

== Area amenities ==
The largest attraction in the Jefferson Westside neighborhood is the fairgrounds, which is also known as the Lane Events Center.

Monroe Park is the major public park in the area which has a performance stage, restrooms, drinking fountains, a basketball court, and a playground.

== Organizations ==
Jefferson and Westside Residents for Healthy Neighborhoods (JWReHN) JWReHN ("Jay-Wren"), Chambers Area Families for Healthy Neighborhoods (CAFHN) CAFHN ("caffeine") organizations within the Jefferson Westside neighborhood, were formed to ensure that the neighborhood is represented in the city Council and to manage growth and ensure livability within the area.

The Residents for Responsible Rapid Transit (RRRT) was formed to understand impacts to the neighborhood with bus rapid transit. The Climate Leadership Initiative (CLI) was formed to better understand impacts of global warming and develop programs to better protect the environment.
