= Eugene Glass School =

Art school in Eugene, Oregon

Coordinates: 44.05356°N 123.13139°W

Eugene Glass School is an art school located in Eugene, Oregon featuring glass art workshops for off-hand, lampworked, and fused glass.
