= KWVA =

Student radio station at the University of Oregon

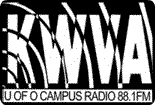
- Eugene, Oregon; United States
- Broadcast area: Eugene-Springfield area
- Frequency: 88.1 MHz
- Branding: U of O Campus Radio 88.1

Programming
- Format: Freeform

Ownership
- Owner: University of Oregon

History
- First air date: May 27, 1993
- Call sign meaning: K Willamette Valley Alternative

Technical information
- Licensing authority: FCC
- Facility ID: 3025
- Class: A
- ERP: 1,000 watts
- HAAT: 54 meters
- Transmitter coordinates: 44°04′56″N 123°06′37″W

Links
- Public license information: Public file; LMS
- Webcast: Listen live
- Website: kwva.uoregon.edu

KWVA (88.1 FM) is a college radio station broadcasting from the Erb Memorial Union on the University of Oregon campus in Eugene, Oregon, United States. Licensed to the University of Oregon, it serves the Eugene-Springfield metropolitan area and has a live online stream. KWVA primarily plays a varied mix of music, along with news/talk shows and live college sports broadcasts.

== Programming ==
Each Sunday, KWVA features Live Sessions from 4pm-6pm during which a band performs live on the air from KWVA. Past performances can be seen on the KWVA youtube channel or audio on the KWVA soundcloud page.

KWVA broadcasts various sports in the Eugene-Springfield area. In the fall, it broadcasts Oregon Soccer, Oregon Volleyball and Thurston High School Football. Also in the fall, KWVA also broadcasts Oregon Football and Bushnell University Volleyball. In the winter, KWVA broadcasts Bushnell Basketball, Thurston Basketball, South Eugene High School Basketball, Oregon Lacrosse and Oregon Women's Basketball. In the spring, KWVA is the flagship station for Oregon Softball, which brings in the most listeners of any of the station's sports broadcasts. KWVA also calls Oregon Acrobatics and Tumbling.

== History ==
The start of student radio at the University of Oregon began with the operation of KWAX, which was operated out of the UO Department of Speech. It served as an academic laboratory providing daily services for the campus and community from studios in Villard Hall. In the 1970s, KWAX affiliated with the Corporation for Public Broadcasting, hired a staff and affiliated with NPR. Two years later, the university cut its academic ties with the station and by the early 1980s there were no students involved at KWAX. KWAX moved off campus and turned into the classical music station that it continues to be today.

In the late 1980s, a group of students decided to start a new student radio station. Students Gary Rosenstein and James January spent months collecting the necessary 1,800 signatures to get the student government to bring the student station up for a vote. During this time KWAX was applying for a construction permit for a new facility broadcasting at 88.1FM on an existing antenna at Blanton Heights in South Eugene. January struck a deal with KWAX. KWAX would operate children's programming from 9 am – 2 pm and UO students would broadcast for the remainder of the day.

The new student station was to be called KRMA, for Real Music Alternative. Studio equipment was donated, thus reducing the start-up costs and allowing on other costs such as construction, production equipment and a microwave link to the Blanton Heights tower. Estimated cost was to be $25,000.

On April 27, 1990, following a student body vote, the Associated Students of the University of Oregon (ASUO) Senate granted funding for a new mixed format student radio station, a total of $25,861 to cover the costs of construction and first year of operation. The measure was passed by more than four to one and students anticipated tuning into the station when they returned to campus the next fall. Due to objections from the US Federal Communications Commission (FCC), namely interference due to antenna position, KWAX reconsidered its second service, thus allowing KRMA to move ahead independent of KWAX, with university approval. An amended application was submitted in April 1992 proposing a name change to KWVA and a relocation of the antenna to the roof of Prince Lucien Campbell Hall, the highest building on the University of Oregon campus. On May 27, 1993, at 1:32 pm, KWVA broadcast its first song, "Hey, Mr. DJ, I Thought You Said We Had A Deal" by They Might Be Giants.

January and Rosenstein graduated and in June 1992, Michael Lovelady became station manager. Then in the summer of 1993 Alyssa Jenson became Station Manager. A few months later, Jay Pierson became Station Manager and stayed in that position for several years. Pierson led KWVA through its formative years as a station. In 2006, KWVA transitioned away from ASUO oversight to EMU oversight and KWVA hired full-time professional station manager Charlotte Nisser. Nisser had been a student volunteer at KWVA while in undergraduate studies at the UO and similarly to Pierson, accepted the position while in grad school.

In February 2008, KWVA received FCC approval for a construction permit to relocate the KWVA transmitter from the top of Prince Lucien Campbell Hall to Goodpasture Island Road and increase signal strength from 500 watts to 1,000 watts. KWVA requested funding from the ASUO/EMU to pay for the one-time installation and equipment expense to make this upgrade and relocation. Funding was approved and installation was successful, upgrading KWVA with modern broadcasting capabilities and increasing its potential listenership to include all of Eugene/Springfield and surrounding areas.

On June 20, 2016, KWVA moved from the EMU Suite M-112 (a former women's restroom which served as the on-air studio) to the renovated EMU Basement Suite 45. A special on air program was compiled by then current and alumni volunteers and staff. From 8am-9:30am a Goodbye show was broadcast, followed by symbolic dead air from 9:30am-10am, and a return to the air with a Hello and New Beginnings show from 10am-noon. The same first song, 'Hey, Mr. DJ, I Thought You Said We Had A Deal' by They Might Be Giants, was broadcast upon return to the air. Staff and volunteers spent the day relocating the contents of Studio A (the women's restroom on-air studio) to the new radio station, most of the contents of the station (main office, equipment, student office) had been moved the week prior when professional moving help was provided by the EMU. The move to new space was part of an overall EMU renovation and new construction, coming in at $95 million for the entire building. The new radio facility was designed specifically for KWVA by General Manager Charlotte Nisser and KWVA Engineer Ali Abdul-Sater, with input from students and volunteers, and consultation with other stations across the country, over a several-year period. Suite 45 is about 3x the size of the original KWVA in Suite M-112.

For KWVA's 30th anniversary, in May 2023 KWVA hosted alumni on the air for over 30 hours of specialty programming. KWVA Alumni from all over the world participated in live and pre-recorded programming to celebrate the anniversary.

Following the COVID-19 pandemic, the sports volunteer base was down to eight volunteers to cover each of the sports. As of Spring 2024, KWVA Sports has over 40 members in their volunteer base and has added a more new broadcasts and coverage. KWVA continued to broadcast music throughout the pandemic, though DJs were not permitted in the studios, they produced shows remotely and managed to continue much of the regular broadcast programming.

== See also ==
- List of college radio stations in the United States
