= Outdoor High School =

School in Eugene, Oregon, United States

Coordinates: 44°1′55″N 123°2′59″W

Outdoor High School is an alternative high school located in Eugene, Oregon, United States. The school was created in 1997 by Northwest Youth Corps with the purpose of combining service learning field studies and outdoor recreation with a traditional classroom setting.

Outdoor High School is a fully accredited program that serves students from 9 school districts in Lane County, Oregon. It offers a traditional diploma. Outdoor High School is an AmeriCorps Program that employs on average five AmeriCorps members yearly. The student turnover rate is high due to dropouts and transfers to other schools. Students go on four camping trips per year, and have two field weeks consisting of either work or hands on learning projects in and around Lane County. There are six full-time administrative and teaching staff.
