= Friendly, Eugene, Oregon =

Coordinates: 44.033196°N 123.101265°W

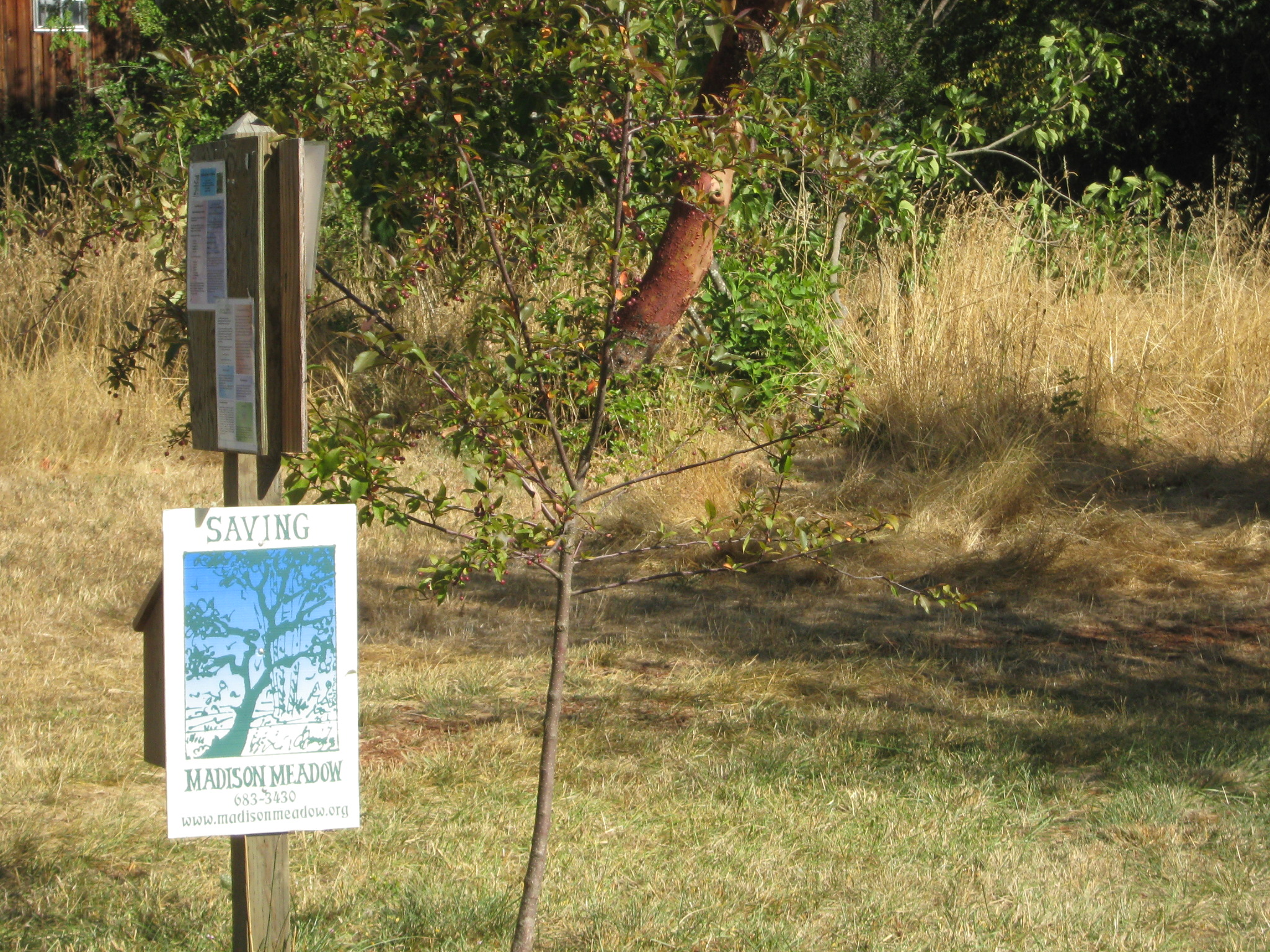
Madison Meadow in the Friendly neighborhood

Friendly is a neighborhood in south central Eugene, Oregon, United States. It is represented by the neighborhood association Friendly Area Neighbors.

The neighborhood is named after Friendly Street, which in turn derives its name from Sam Friendly, a 19th-century mayor of the city. The area is home to more than 7,000 residents, and includes Civic Stadium, Westmoreland Park, Madison Meadow, and the western half of Amazon Park. The neighborhood directly adjoins Eugene's downtown area.
