= Wellsprings Friends School =

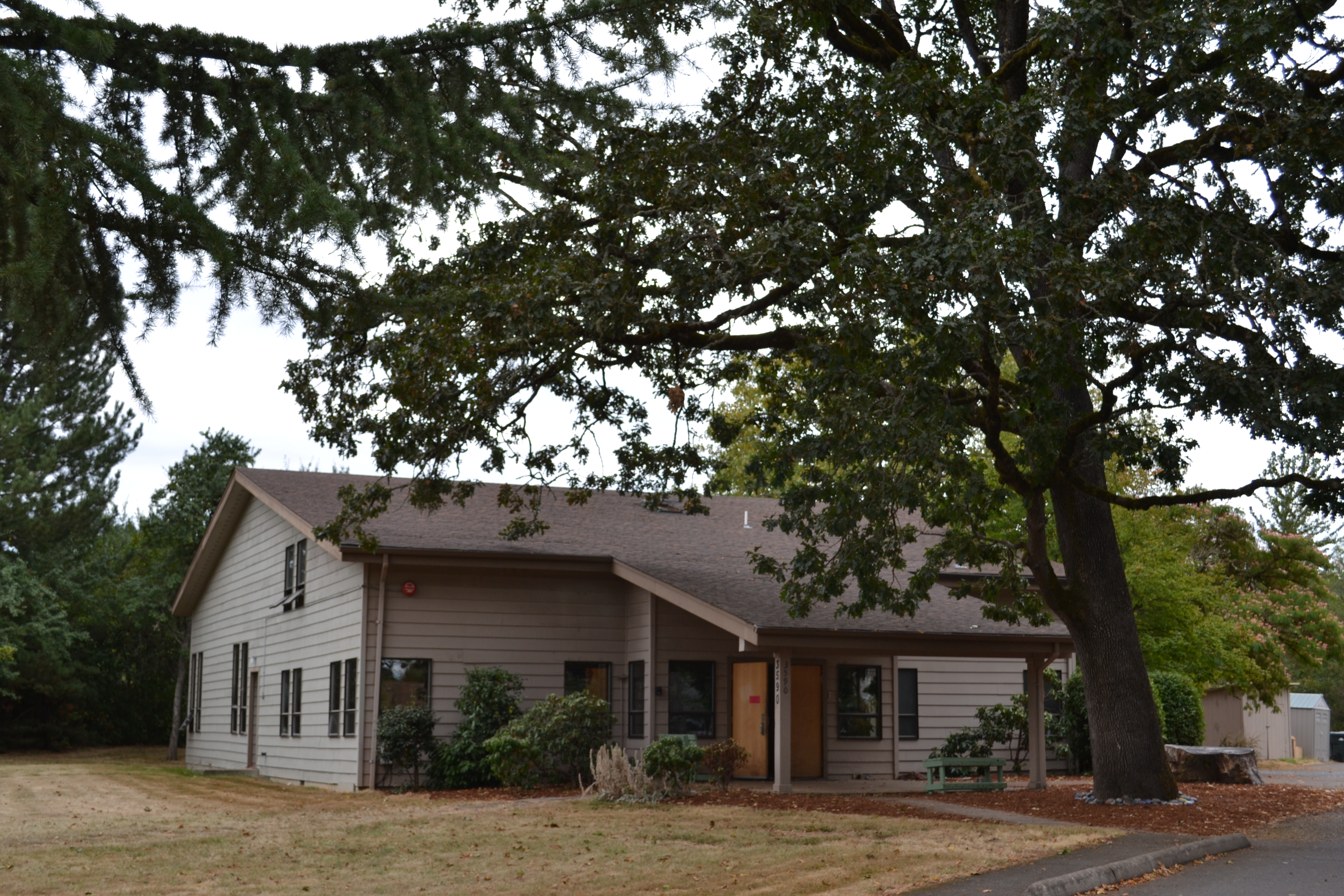

Location
- 3590 W 18th Avenue; Eugene, (Lane County), Oregon 97402; United States; 44.040055°N 123.147324°W

Information
- Type: Private
- Opened: 1996
- Grades: 9-12
- Enrollment: 60
- Accreditation: NAAS
- Website: wellspringsfriends.org

Wellsprings Friends School is a private non-profit alternative high school in Eugene, Oregon, United States. It was founded in 1994 by members of the Eugene Friends Meeting, a local Quaker church. It serves a maximum of 65 students each year in grades 9-12.

== Academics ==
Wellsprings is accredited through the Northwest Association of Accredited Schools.
