= Hendricks Park =

Park in Eugene, Oregon, U.S.

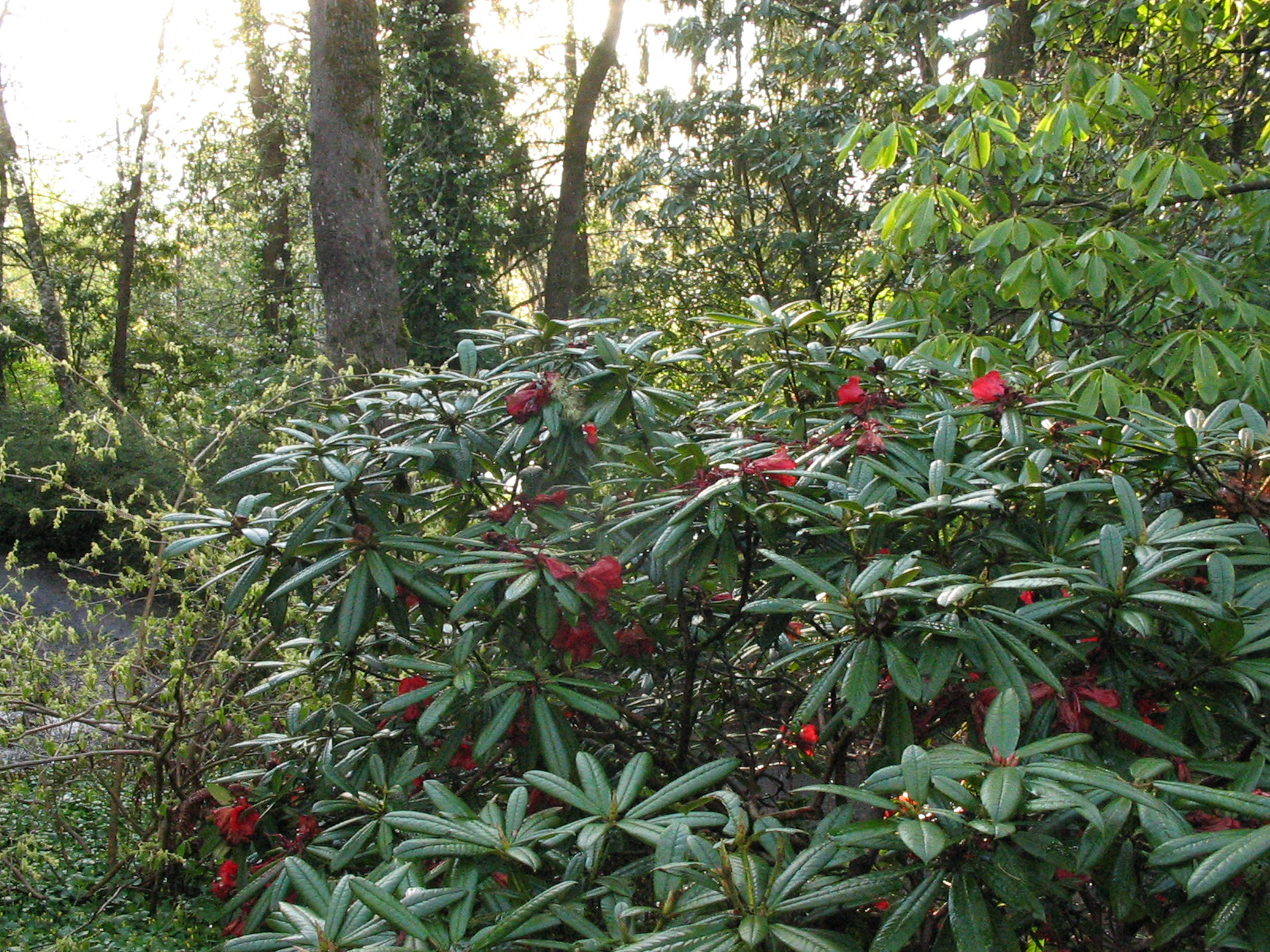
- Interactive map of Hendricks Park
- Type: municipal
- Location: Eugene, Oregon; United States
- Coordinates: 44.035°N 123.058°W
- Area: 78 acres (32 ha)
- Operator: City of Eugene
- Open: 6:00am – 11:00pm
- Status: open

Hendricks Park is the oldest city park in Eugene, Oregon, United States. The 78-acre (320,000 m^{2}) park is a little over a mile away from the University of Oregon campus, and contains mature forest, a 12-acre (4.9 ha) rhododendron garden, and a native plant garden. The park is laced with trails suitable for hiking, jogging, and birding.

== History ==
The park was created in 1906 by the City of Eugene. Former Eugene mayor and president of the First National bank Thomas G. Hendricks and his wife, Martha A. Hendricks, donated 47 acres. The city purchased an adjacent 31 acres from Colonel Smith.

In 1997, the city of Eugene responded to neighbors' concerns of falling trees by felling potentially hazardous trees on the park's eastern boundary. When other nearby residents and park lovers objected, the city stopped removing trees and formed a committee to study the issue. As a result of the committee's work, City Councilor Laurie Swanson-Gribscov was able to persuade the council to commit up to $50,000 for a long-range management plan for Hendricks Park's trees and forest.

In 2000, the city council enacted the Hendricks Park Forest Management Plan. With its implementation, park staff have worked in partnership with the Friends of Hendricks Park and other community volunteers to help achieve a healthy, resilient, and sustainable forest.

== Friends of Hendricks Park ==
Friends of Hendricks Park (FoHP) is a 501(c)(3) non-profit organization founded in 2001 that is devoted to the stewardship and restoration of Hendricks Park. Currently the organization has about 300 members who contribute to FoHP through organizing and participating in volunteer programs, maintaining partnerships with the City of Eugene's Parks & Open Space department, and leading educational tours and lectures.

Their accomplishments include funding volunteer coordination programs, installing new swings, establishing 4 endowment funds, and helping in a variety of plant life conservation and preservation efforts in the park.

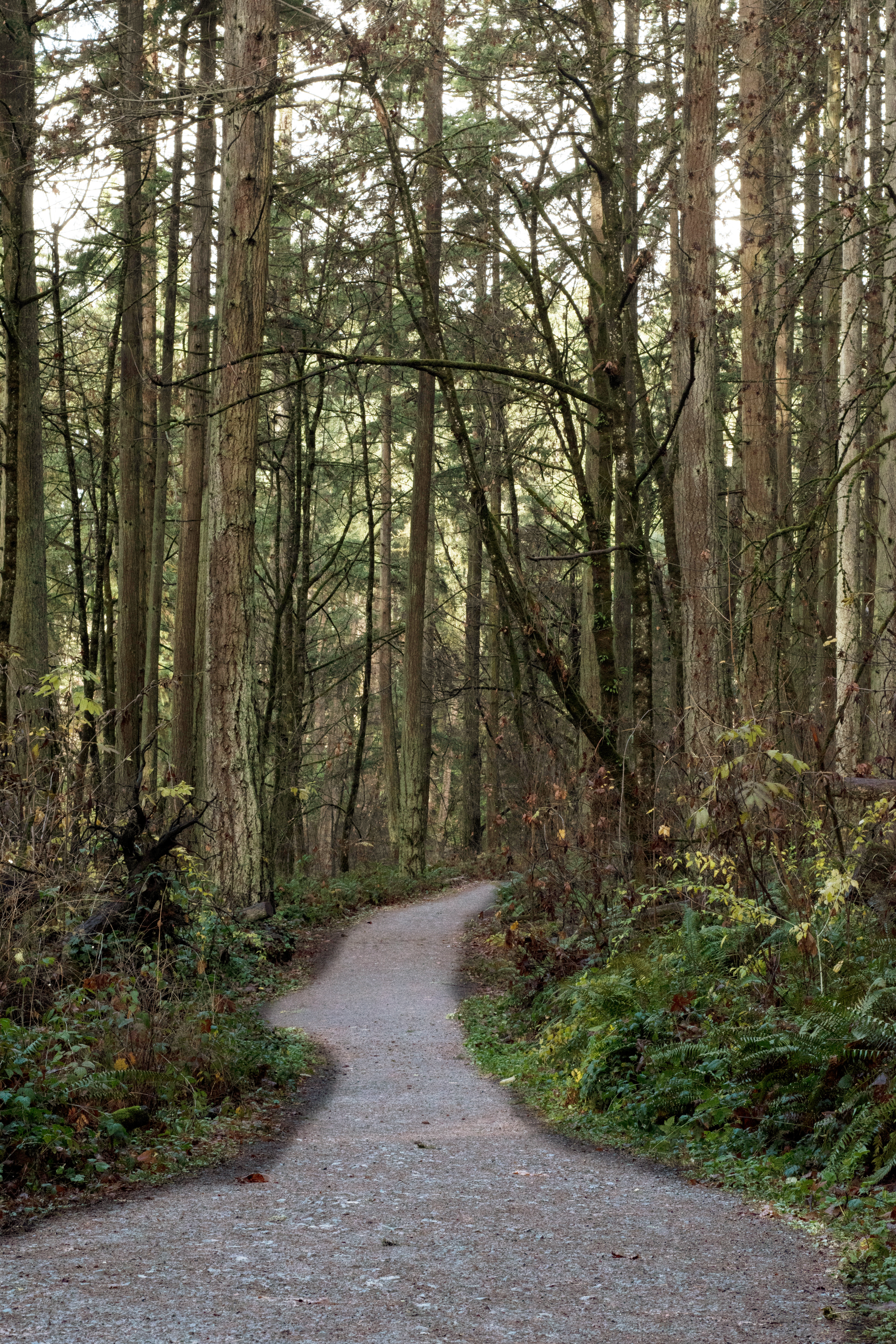

== See also ==
- List of botanical gardens in the United States
