= Eugene, Oregon =

City in Oregon, United States

- City
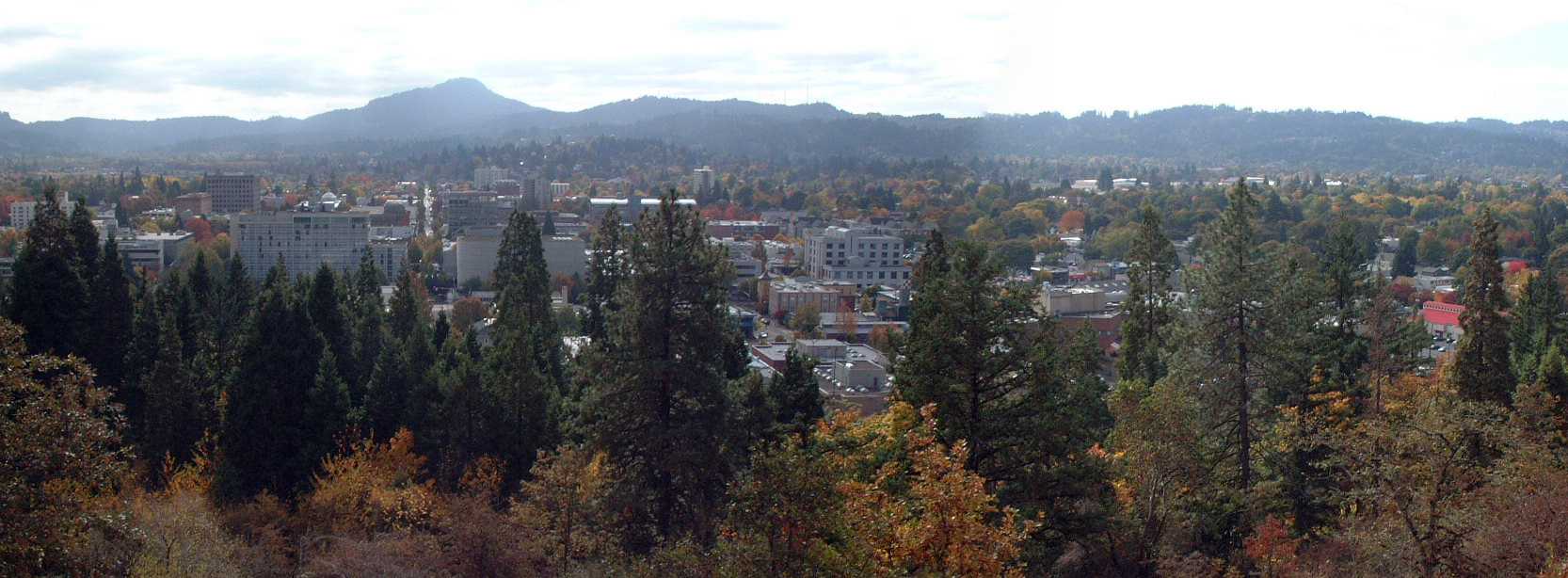
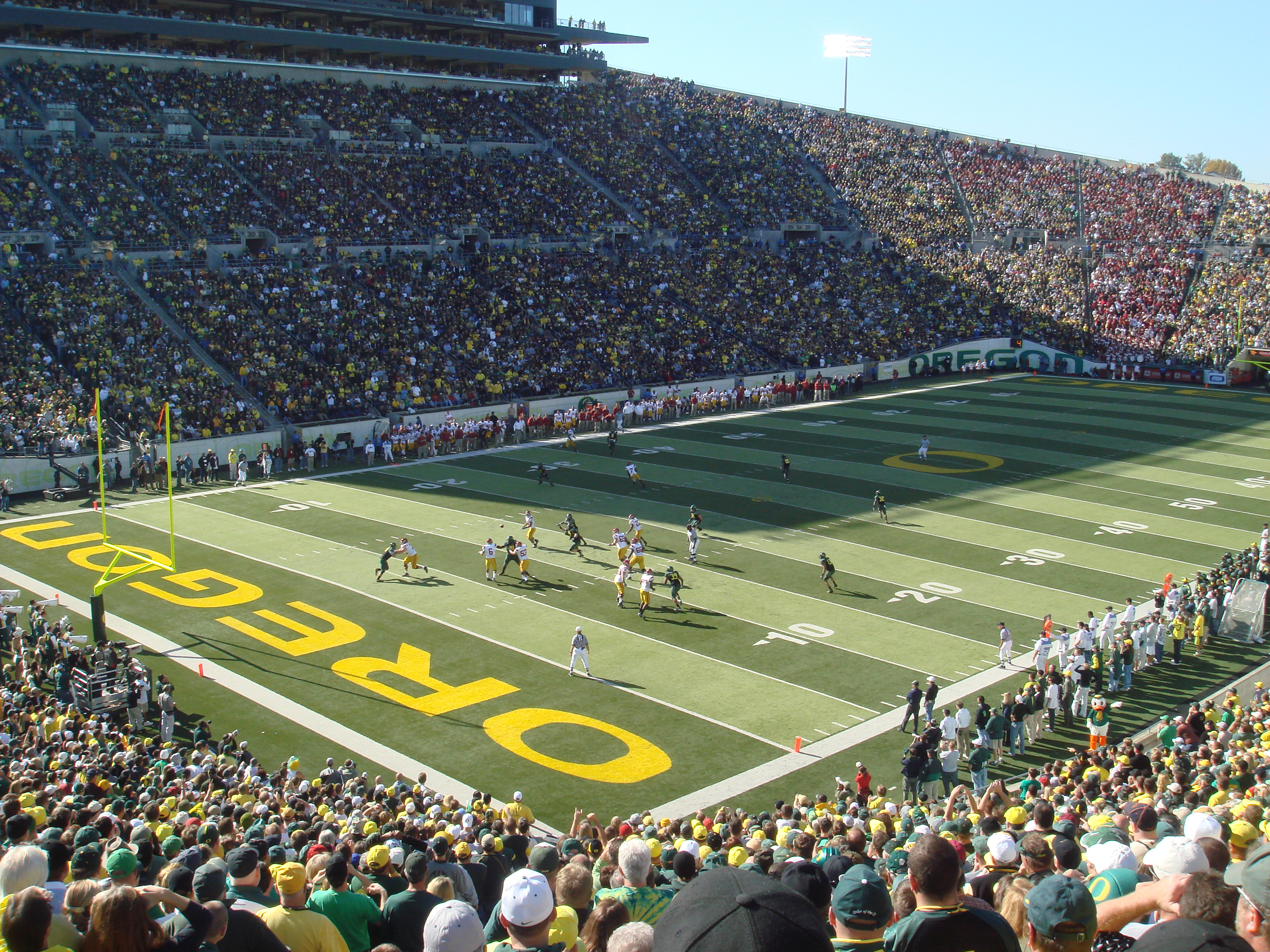
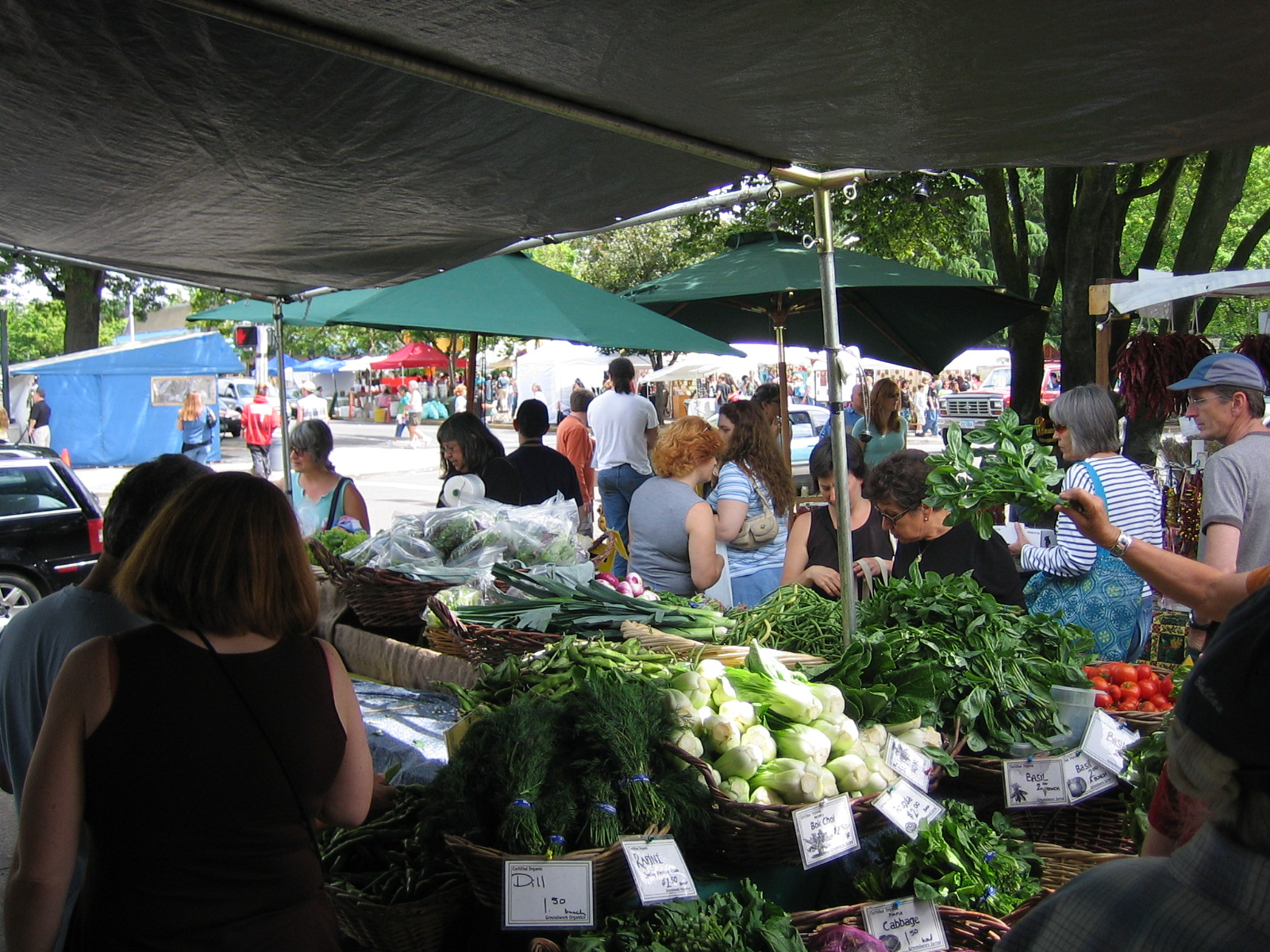
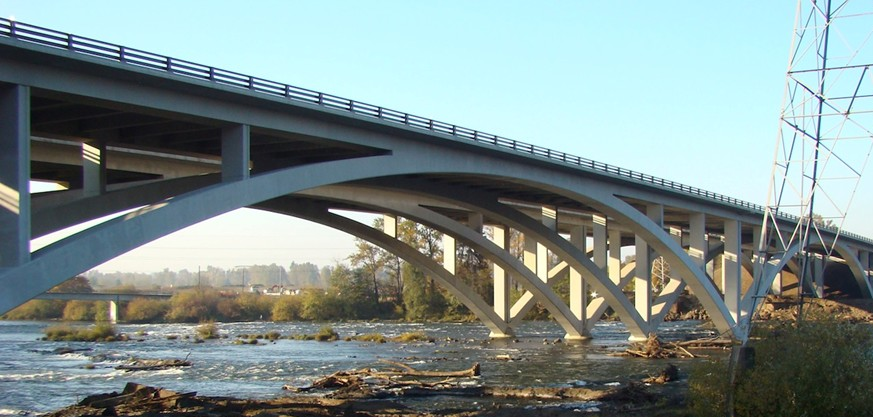
- Eugene from Skinner Butte Autzen Stadium Lane County Farmers Market Whilamut Passage Bridge

- Seal
- Nicknames: Emerald Valley, The Emerald City, Track Town USA
- Motto(s): A Great City for the Arts and Outdoors
- Interactive map of Eugene, Oregon
- Location within Oregon Location within the United States
- Coordinates: 44°3′8″N 123°5′33″W
- Country: United States
- State: Oregon
- County: Lane
- Founded: 1846
- Incorporated: October 17, 1862
- Founder: Eugene Skinner
- Named for: Eugene Skinner

Government
  - Type: Council–manager
  - Mayor: Kaarin Knudson (D)
  - City manager: Sarah Medary

Area
  - City: 44.29 sq mi (114.70 km^{2})
  - Land: 44.22 sq mi (114.52 km^{2})
  - Water: 0.069 sq mi (0.18 km^{2})
- Elevation: 413 ft (126 m)

Population (2020)
  - City: 176,654
  - Rank: US: 148th
  - Density: 3,995/sq mi (1,542.5/km^{2})
  - Urban: 270,179 (US: 151st)
  - Urban density: 3,677/sq mi (1,419.6/km^{2})
  - Metro: 382,971 (US: 146th)
- Demonym(s): Eugenean; Eugenian; Eugenite

GDP
  - Metro: $22.551 billion (2023)
- Time zone: UTC−08:00 (PST)
  - Summer (DST): UTC−07:00 (PDT)
- ZIP Codes: 97401–97405, 97408, 97440
- Area codes: 458 and 541
- FIPS code: 41-23850
- Website: www.eugene-or.gov

Eugene (/juːˈdʒiːn/ yoo-JEEN) is a city in and the county seat of Lane County, Oregon, United States. It is located at the southern end of the Willamette Valley, near the confluence of the McKenzie and Willamette rivers, about 50 miles (80 km) east of the Oregon Coast and approximately 110 miles (180 km) south of Portland.

The second-most populous city in Oregon, Eugene had a population of 176,654 as of the 2020 United States census and it covers a city area of 44.21 sq mi (114.5 km^{2}). The Eugene-Springfield metropolitan statistical area is the second-largest in Oregon after Portland. In 2022, Eugene's population was estimated to have reached 179,887.

Eugene is home to the University of Oregon, Bushnell University, and Lane Community College. The city is noted for its natural environment, recreational opportunities (especially bicycling, hiking trails, running/jogging, rafting, and kayaking), and focus on the arts, along with its history of civil unrest, riots, and green activism. Eugene's official motto is "A Great City for the Arts and Outdoors". It is also referred to as the "Emerald City" and as "Track Town, USA". The Nike Corporation had its beginnings in Eugene. In July 2022, the city hosted the 18th World Athletics Championship.

== History ==
=== Indigenous history ===
The first people to settle in the Eugene area were the Chifin band of the Kalapuyans, also written Calapooia or Calapooya. They made "seasonal rounds", moving around the countryside to collect and preserve local foods, including acorns, the bulbs of the wapato and camas plants, and berries. They stored these foods in their permanent winter village. When crop activities waned, they returned to their winter villages and took up hunting, fishing, and trading. They were known as the Chifin Kalapuyans and called the Eugene area where they lived "Chifin", sometimes recorded as "Chafin" or "Chiffin".

Other Kalapuyan tribes occupied villages that are also now within Eugene city limits. Pee-you or Mohawk Calapooians, Winefelly or Pleasant Hill Calapooians, and the Lungtum or Long Tom. They were close-neighbors to the Chifin, intermarried, and were political allies. Some authorities suggest the Brownsville Kalapuyans (Calapooia Kalapuyans) were related to the Pee-you. It is likely that since the Santiam had an alliance with the Brownsville Kalapuyans that the Santiam influence also went as far at Eugene.

According to archeological evidence, the ancestors of the Kalapuyans may have been in Eugene for as long as 10,000 years. In the 1800s their traditional way of life faced significant changes due to devastating epidemics and settlement, first by French fur traders and later by an overwhelming number of European settlers. Some sources also stated that their number started to decline in the nineteenth century due to diseases such as Small pox and Malaria.

=== Settlement and impact ===
French fur traders had settled seasonally in the Willamette Valley by the beginning of the 19th century. Their settlements were concentrated in the "French Prairie" community in Northern Marion County but may have extended south to the Eugene area. Having already developed relationships with Native communities through intermarriage and trade, they negotiated for land from the Kalapuyans. By 1828 to 1830 they and their Native wives began year-round occupation of the land, raising crops and tending animals. In this process, the mixed race families began to impact Native access to land, food supply, and traditional materials for trade and religious practices.

In July 1830, "intermittent fever" struck the lower Columbia region and a year later, the Willamette Valley. Natives traced the arrival of the disease, then new to the Pacific Northwest, to the USS Owyhee, captained by John Dominis. "Intermittent fever" is thought by researchers now to be malaria. According to Robert T. Boyd, an anthropologist at Portland State University, the first three years of the epidemic, "probably constitute the single most important epidemiological event in the recorded history of what would eventually become the state of Oregon". In his book The Coming of the Spirit Pestilence Boyd reports there was a 92% population loss for the Kalapuyans between 1830 and 1841. This catastrophic event shattered the social fabric of Kalapuyan society and altered the demographic balance in the Valley. This balance was further altered over the next few years by the arrival of Anglo-American settlers, beginning in 1840 with 13 people and growing steadily each year until within 20 years more than 11,000 European American settlers, including Eugene Skinner, had arrived.

As the demographic pressure from the settlers grew, the remaining Kalapuyans were forcibly removed to Indian reservations. Though some Natives avoided transfer into the reservation, most were moved to the Grand Ronde reservation in 1856. Strict racial segregation was enforced and mixed race people, known as Métis in French, had to make a choice between the reservation and Anglo-American society. Native Americans could not leave the reservation without traveling papers and white people could not enter the reservation.

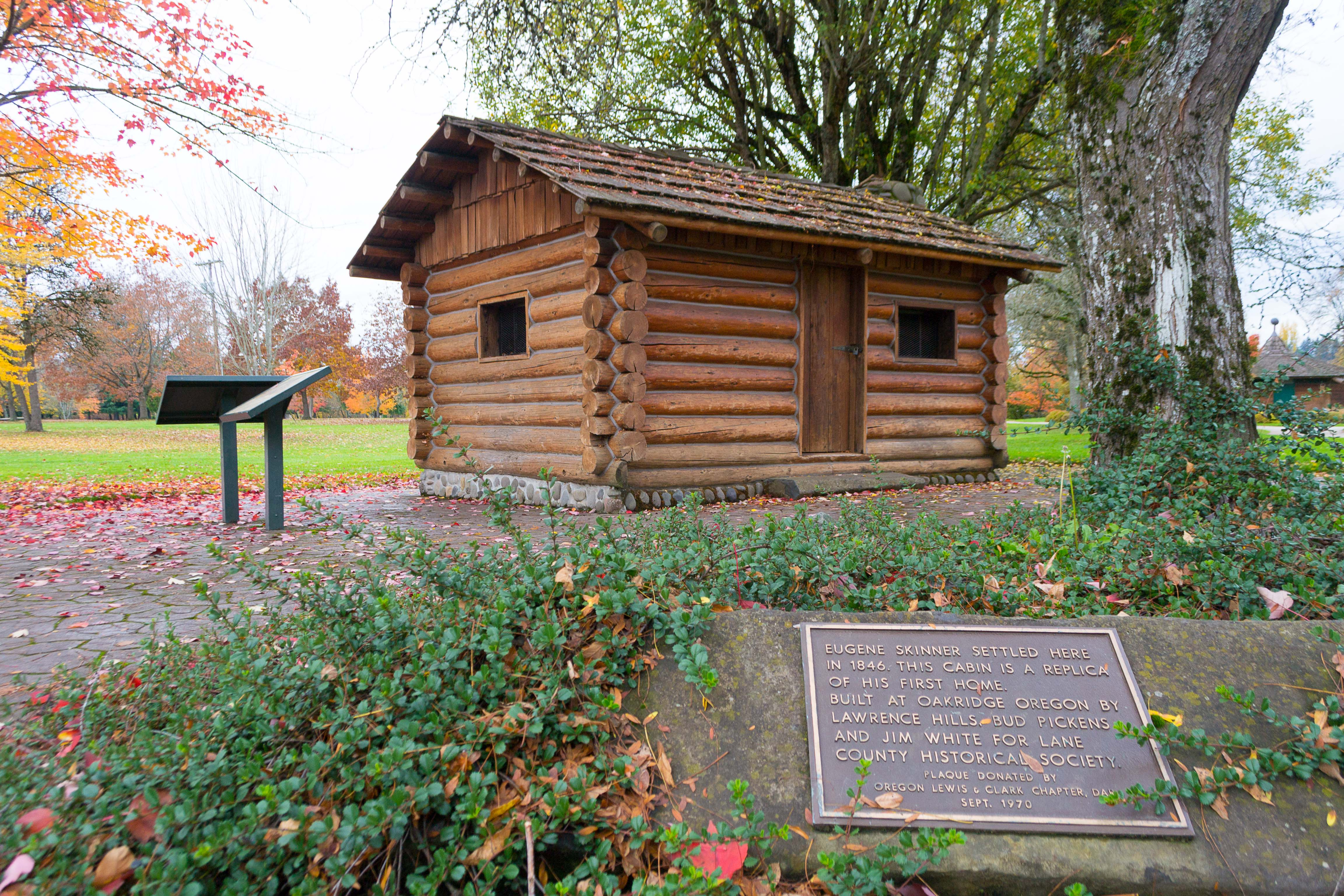
Replica of Skinner's original cabin

Eugene Franklin Skinner, after whom Eugene is named, arrived in the Willamette Valley in 1846 with 1,200 other settlers that year. Advised by the Kalapuyans to build on high ground to avoid flooding, he erected the first pioneer cabin on south or west slope of what the Kalapuyans called Ya-po-ah. The "isolated hill" is now known as Skinner's Butte. The cabin was used as a trading post and was registered as an official post office on January 8, 1850.

At this time the settlement was known by settlers as Skinner's Mudhole. It was relocated in 1853 and named Eugene City in 1853. Formally incorporated as a city in 1862, it was renamed to Eugene in 1889. Skinner ran a ferry service across the Willamette River where the Ferry Street Bridge now stands.

=== Educational institutions ===
The first major educational institution in the area was Columbia College, founded a few years earlier than the University of Oregon. It fell victim to two major fires in four years, and after the second fire, the college decided not to rebuild again. The part of south Eugene known as College Hill was the former location of Columbia College. There is no college there today.

The town raised the initial funding to start a public university, which later became the University of Oregon, with the hope of turning the small town into a center of learning. In 1872, the Legislative Assembly passed a bill creating the University of Oregon as a state institution. Eugene bested the nearby town of Albany in the competition for the state university. In 1873, community member J.H.D. Henderson donated the hilltop land for the campus, overlooking the city. The university first opened in 1876 with the regents electing the first faculty and naming John Wesley Johnson as president. The first students registered on October 16, 1876. The first building was completed in 1877; it was named Deady Hall in honor of the first Board of Regents President and community leader Judge Matthew P. Deady.

Other universities in Eugene include Bushnell University and New Hope Christian College.

=== Twentieth century ===
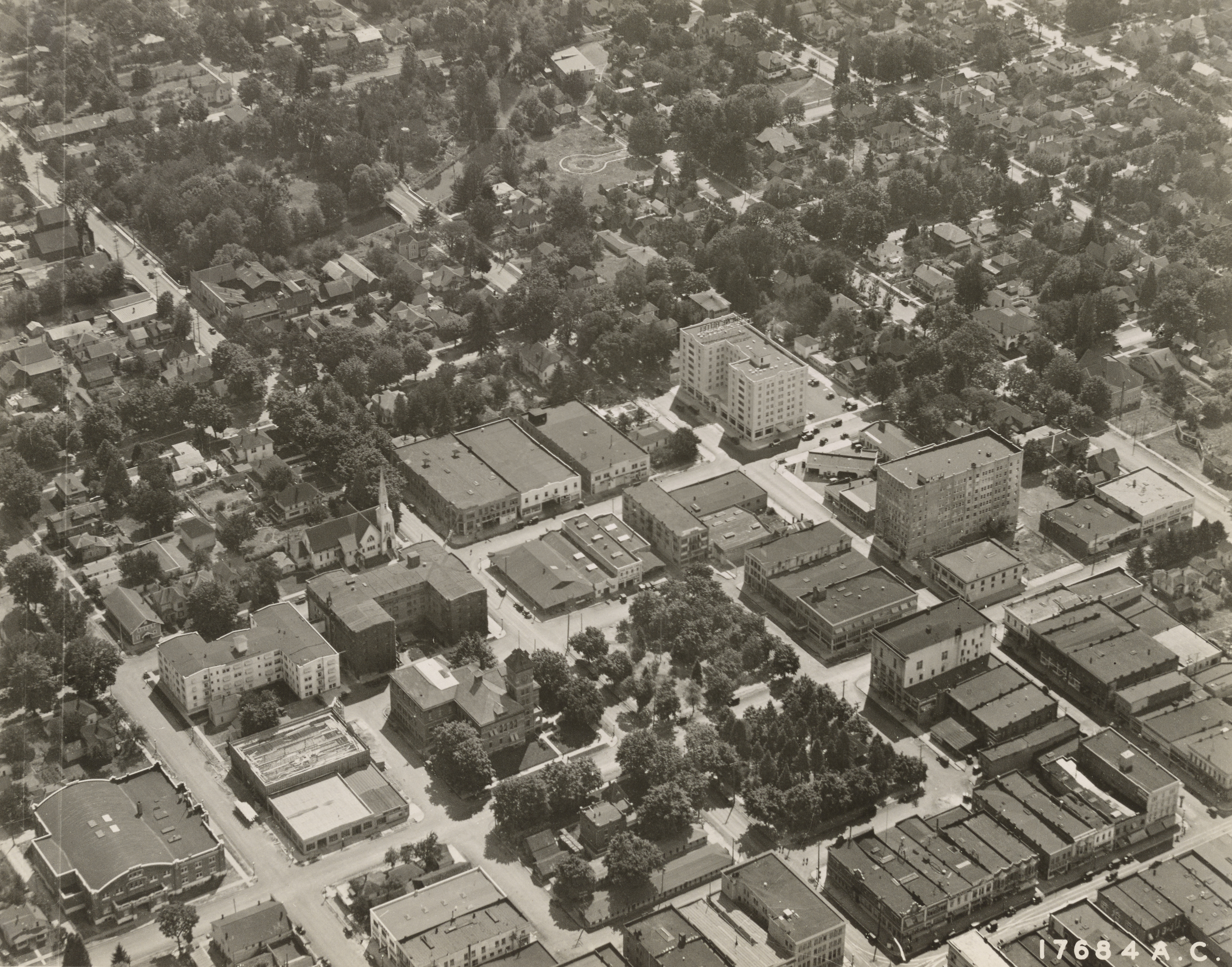
Downtown Eugene in 1925

Eugene grew rapidly throughout most of the twentieth century, with the exception being the early 1980s when a downturn in the timber industry caused high unemployment. By 1985, the industry had recovered and Eugene began to attract more high-tech industries, earning it the moniker the "Emerald Shire". In 2012, Eugene and the surrounding metro area was dubbed the Silicon shire.

The first Nike shoe was used in 1972 during the US Olympic trials held in Eugene.

=== Activism ===
The 1970s saw an increase in community activism. Local activists stopped a proposed freeway and lobbied for the construction of the Washington Jefferson Park beneath the Washington-Jefferson Street Bridge. Community Councils soon began to form as a result of these efforts. A notable impact of the turn to community-organized politics came with Eugene Local Measure 51, a ballot measure in 1978 that repealed a gay rights ordinance approved by the Eugene City Council in 1977 that prohibited discrimination by sexual orientation. Eugene is also home to Beyond Toxics, a nonprofit environmental justice organization founded in 2000.

One hotspot for protest activity since the 1990s has been the Whiteaker district, located in the northwest of downtown Eugene. The Whiteaker is primarily a working-class neighborhood that has become a cultural hub, center of community and activism and home to alternative artists. It saw an increase of activity in the 1990s after many young people drawn to Eugene's political climate relocated there. Animal rights groups have had a heavy presence in the Whiteaker, and several vegan restaurants are located there. According to David Samuels, the Animal Liberation Front and the Earth Liberation Front have had an underground presence in the neighborhood. The neighborhood is home to a number of communal apartment buildings, which are often organized by anarchist or environmentalist groups. Local activists have also produced independent films and started art galleries, community gardens, and independent media outlets. Copwatch, Food Not Bombs, and Critical Mass are also active in the neighborhood.

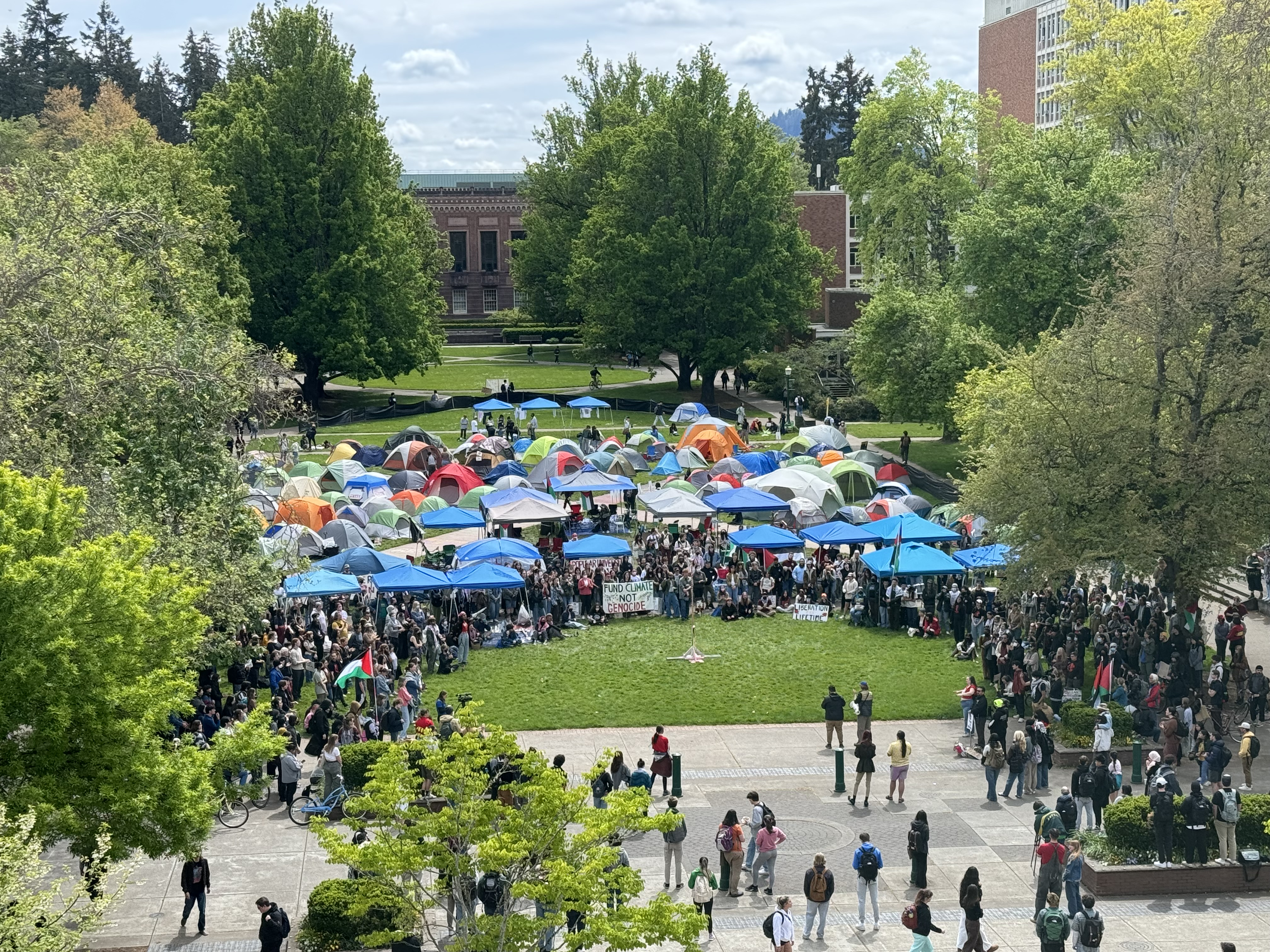
The University of Oregon encampment on May 1, 2024

The 21st century has seen continued environmental and social justice activism. In 2011, the Occupy Eugene protests from October to December occurred in connection with the Occupy Wall Street movement, and these local protests included around 2000 participants. In 2020, George Floyd protests occurred in May and June, including peaceful demonstrations and riots. These protests in connection with the nationwide 2020 George Floyd protests resulted in increased consciousness towards Eugene's black history and race issues and resulted in the renaming of University Hall and the toppling of the Pioneer and Pioneer mother statues at the University of Oregon. In 2023 and 2024, activist groups held several demonstrations related to the Israel-Palestine conflict across the city, including marches with hundreds of participants, the April 15, 2024, I-5 protest which blocked southbound traffic for hours and led to the largest mass arrests in Eugene activist history, and the 2024 University of Oregon pro-Palestinian campus occupation as part of the 2024 pro-Palestinian protests on college campuses.

== Geography ==
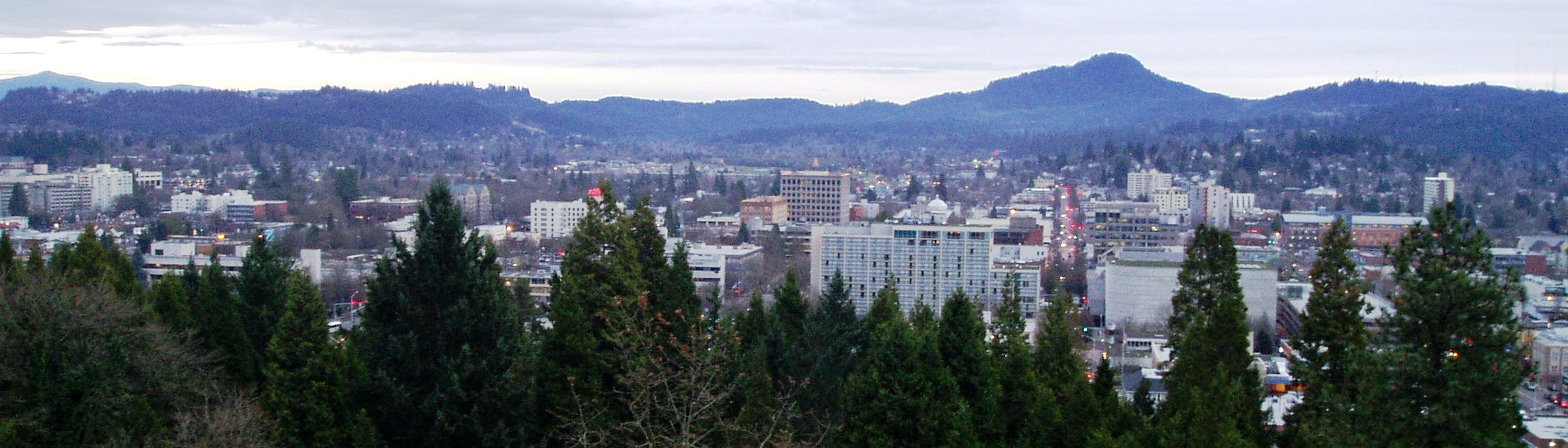
Spencer Butte can be seen from much of the city.

According to the United States Census Bureau, the city has a total area of 43.74 square miles (113.29 km^{2}), of which 43.72 square miles (113.23 km^{2}) is land and 0.02 square miles (0.05 km^{2}) is water. Eugene is at an elevation of 426 feet (130 m).

To the north of downtown are Gillespie Butte and Skinner Butte. Northeast of the city are the Coburg Hills. Spencer Butte is a prominent landmark south of the city. Mount Pisgah is southeast of Eugene and includes the Mount Pisgah Arboretum and the Howard Buford Recreation Area, a Lane County Park. Eugene is surrounded by foothills and forests to the south, east, and west, while to the north the land levels out into the Willamette Valley and consists of mostly farmland.

The Willamette and McKenzie Rivers run through Eugene and its neighboring city, Springfield. Another important stream is Amazon Creek, whose headwaters are near Spencer Butte. The creek discharges into the Long Tom River north Fern Ridge Reservoir, maintained for winter flood control by the Army Corps of Engineers. The Eugene Yacht Club hosts a sailing school and sailing regattas at Fern Ridge during summer months.

=== Neighborhoods ===
Eugene has 23 neighborhoods:

- Bethel
- Amazon
- Cal Young
- Churchill
- Downtown
- Fairmount
- Far West
- Friendly
- Goodpasture Island
- Harlow
- Industrial Corridor
- Jefferson Westside
- Laurel Hill
- Northeast
- River Road
- Santa Clara
- Southeast
- South University
- Southwest Hills
- Trainsong
- West Eugene
- West University
- Whiteaker

The River Road and Santa Clara communities, which make up the northwestern part of the city, are neighborhoods within the urban growth boundary of Eugene. However, they are mostly outside of the city limits.

=== Climate ===
Like the rest of the Willamette Valley, Eugene lies in the Marine West Coast climate zone, with Mediterranean characteristics. Under the Köppen climate classification scheme, Eugene has a warm-summer Mediterranean climate (Köppen: Csb). Temperatures can vary from cool to warm, with warm, dry summers and cool, wet winters. Spring and fall are also moist seasons, with light rain falling for long periods. The average rainfall is 40.83 inches (1,040 mm), with the wettest "rain year" being from July 1973 to June 1974 with 75.59 inches (1,920.0 mm) and the driest from July 2000 to June 2001 with 20.40 inches (518.2 mm). Measurements taken by NOAA over the past four decades have indicated a significant decline in average annual precipitation. From 1981 to 2010 inclusive, the reported annual average precipitation was 46.1 inches (1,170 mm), but for the thirty-year period ending in 2020, the annual average had declined 5.27 inches (134 mm), to 40.83 inches (1,040 mm). The figures from the second half of that period, or 2006 to 2020 inclusive, pointed to a further decline of more than 4 inches (102 mm), down to an annual average of 36.58 inches (929 mm).

Winter snowfall does occur, but it is sporadic and rarely accumulates in large amounts: the normal seasonal amount is 4.9 inches (12 cm), but the median is zero. The record snowfall was 41.7 inches (106 cm) of accumulation due to a pineapple express on January 25–29, 1969. Ice storms, like snowfall, are rare, but occur sporadically.

The hottest months are July and August, with a normal monthly mean temperature of 67.8 to 67.9 °F (19.9 to 19.9 °C), with an average of 16 days per year reaching 90 °F (32 °C). The coolest month is December, with a mean temperature of 40.6 °F (4.8 °C), and there are 52 mornings per year with a low at or below freezing, and 2 afternoons with highs not exceeding the freezing mark. The coldest daytime high of the year averages 32 °F (0 °C), reaching the freezing point.

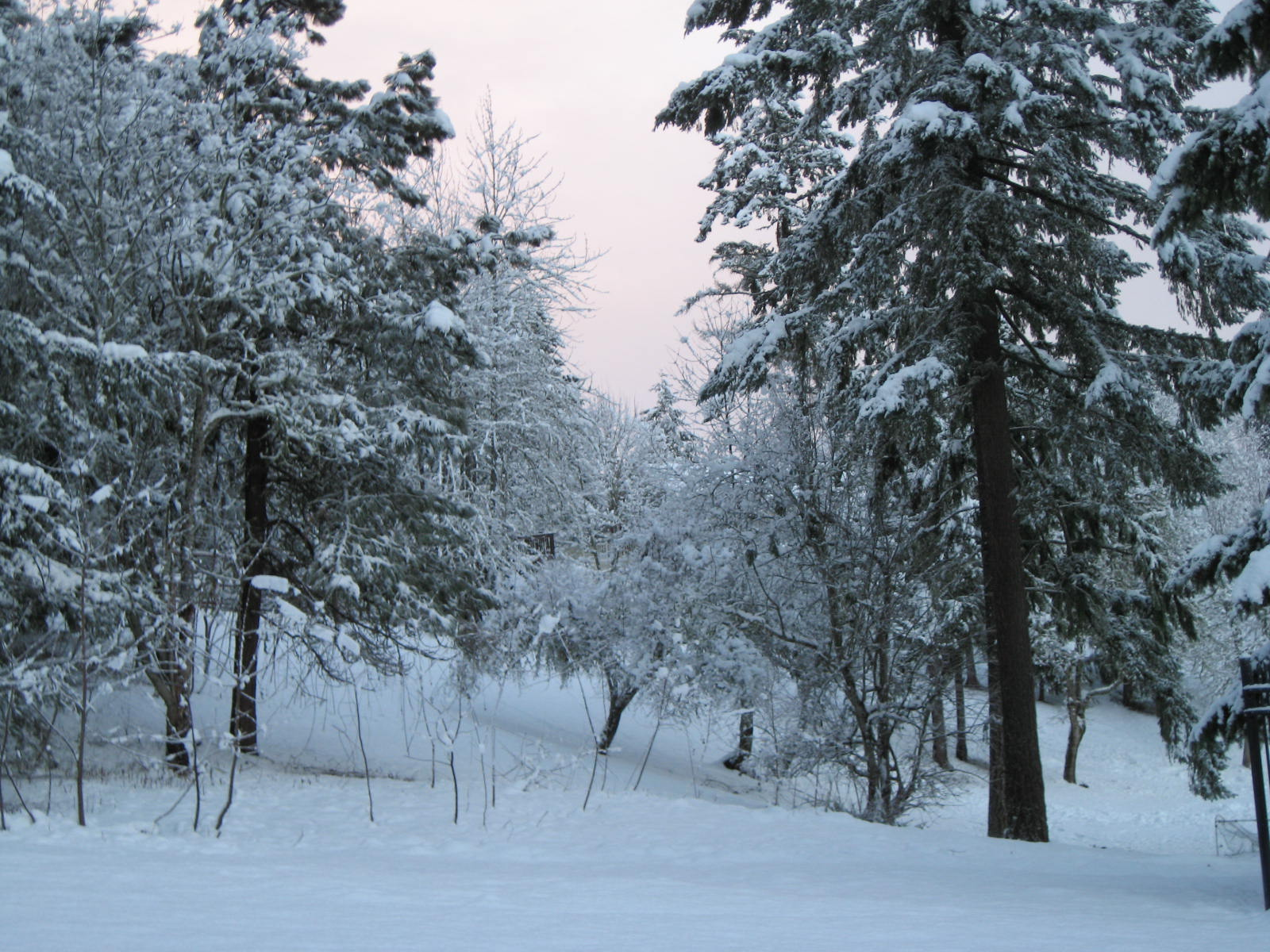
The result of rare heavy snow in January 2008

Eugene's average annual temperature is 53.1 °F (11.7 °C), and annual precipitation at 40.83 inches (1,040 mm). Eugene is slightly cooler on average than Portland. Despite being located about 100 miles (160 km) south and at an only slightly higher elevation, Eugene has a more continental climate than Portland, less subject to the maritime air that blows inland from the Pacific Ocean via the Columbia River. Eugene's normal annual mean minimum is 41.9 °F (5.5 °C), compared to 46.2 °F (7.9 °C) in Portland; in August, the gap in the normal mean minimum widens to 51.1 and 58.0 °F (10.6 and 14.4 °C) for Eugene and Portland, respectively. Eugene's warmest night annually averages a modest 62 °F (17 °C). Average winter temperatures (and summer high temperatures) are similar for the two cities.

Extreme temperatures range from −12 °F (−24 °C), recorded on December 8, 1972, to 111 °F (44 °C) on June 27, 2021; the record cold daily maximum is 19 °F (−7 °C), recorded on December 13, 1919, while, conversely, the record warm daily minimum is 71 °F (22 °C) on July 22, 2006.

Climate data for Eugene Airport, Oregon (1991–2020 normals, (Note: Mean monthly maxima and minima (i.e. the highest and lowest temperature readings during an entire month or year) calculated based on data at said location from 1991 to 2020.) snow & sun 1981–2010, extremes 1892–present)
Month	Jan	Feb	Mar	Apr	May	Jun	Jul	Aug	Sep	Oct	Nov	Dec	Year
Record high °F (°C)	69 (21)	78 (26)	80 (27)	89 (32)	95 (35)	111 (44)	106 (41)	108 (42)	103 (39)	94 (34)	76 (24)	68 (20)	111 (44)
Mean maximum °F (°C)	60.2 (15.7)	61.9 (16.6)	69.8 (21.0)	76.3 (24.6)	83.4 (28.6)	89.7 (32.1)	97.6 (36.4)	97.8 (36.6)	92.2 (33.4)	78.5 (25.8)	65.8 (18.8)	59.1 (15.1)	100.6 (38.1)
Mean daily maximum °F (°C)	48.1 (8.9)	51.5 (10.8)	56.6 (13.7)	61.3 (16.3)	68.1 (20.1)	74.2 (23.4)	84.0 (28.9)	84.3 (29.1)	78.0 (25.6)	64.9 (18.3)	53.2 (11.8)	46.8 (8.2)	64.3 (17.9)
Daily mean °F (°C)	41.4 (5.2)	43.3 (6.3)	46.9 (8.3)	50.7 (10.4)	56.1 (13.4)	60.9 (16.1)	67.8 (19.9)	67.9 (19.9)	62.9 (17.2)	53.4 (11.9)	45.5 (7.5)	40.6 (4.8)	53.1 (11.7)
Mean daily minimum °F (°C)	34.7 (1.5)	35.0 (1.7)	37.2 (2.9)	40.0 (4.4)	44.0 (6.7)	47.6 (8.7)	51.7 (10.9)	51.5 (10.8)	47.8 (8.8)	41.8 (5.4)	37.7 (3.2)	34.3 (1.3)	41.9 (5.5)
Mean minimum °F (°C)	22.7 (−5.2)	24.6 (−4.1)	28.5 (−1.9)	31.8 (−0.1)	34.5 (1.4)	38.3 (3.5)	44.3 (6.8)	43.3 (6.3)	38.5 (3.6)	29.2 (−1.6)	24.9 (−3.9)	21.9 (−5.6)	17.1 (−8.3)
Record low °F (°C)	−4 (−20)	−3 (−19)	18 (−8)	25 (−4)	28 (−2)	32 (0)	39 (4)	35 (2)	30 (−1)	17 (−8)	12 (−11)	−10 (−23)	−10 (−23)
Average precipitation inches (mm)	6.05 (154)	4.67 (119)	4.64 (118)	3.32 (84)	2.46 (62)	1.23 (31)	0.32 (8.1)	0.39 (9.9)	1.39 (35)	3.17 (81)	5.98 (152)	7.21 (183)	40.83 (1,037)
Average snowfall inches (cm)	1.3 (3.3)	4.3 (11)	0.0 (0.0)	0.0 (0.0)	0.0 (0.0)	0.0 (0.0)	0.0 (0.0)	0.0 (0.0)	0.0 (0.0)	0.0 (0.0)	0.0 (0.0)	1.5 (3.8)	7.1 (18.1)
Average precipitation days (≥ 0.01 in)	17.9	15.5	17.6	15.5	11.9	7.9	2.6	2.8	5.9	11.9	17.5	18.7	145.7
Average snowy days (≥ 0.1 in)	0.6	1.2	0.1	0.0	0.0	0.0	0.0	0.0	0.0	0.0	0.0	0.5	2.4
Mean monthly sunshine hours	133.3	115.8	167.4	201.0	254.2	270.0	337.9	341.0	276.0	167.4	138.0	130.2	2,532.2
Average ultraviolet index	2	2	3	3	4	5	6	5	4	3	2	2	3
Source 1: NOAA
Source 2: Weather Atlas (UV)

==== Air quality and allergies ====
Eugene is downwind of Willamette Valley grass seed farms. The combination of summer grass pollen and the confining shape of the hills around Eugene make it "the area of the highest grass pollen counts in the USA (>1,500 pollen grains/m^{3} of air)." These high pollen counts have led to difficulties for some track athletes who compete in Eugene. In the Olympic trials in 1972, "Jim Ryun won the 1,500 after being flown in by helicopter because he was allergic to Eugene's grass seed pollen." Further, six-time Olympian Maria Mutola abandoned Eugene as a training area "in part to avoid allergies".

== Demographics ==
Historical population
Census	Pop.	Note	%±
1860	1,183		—
1870	861		−27.2%
1880	1,117		29.7%
1890	2,177		94.9%
1900	3,236		48.6%
1910	9,009		178.4%
1920	10,593		17.6%
1930	18,901		78.4%
1940	20,838		10.2%
1950	35,879		72.2%
1960	50,977		42.1%
1970	79,028		55.0%
1980	105,664		33.7%
1990	112,669		6.6%
2000	137,893		22.4%
2010	156,185		13.3%
2020	176,654		13.1%
2022 (est.)	179,887		1.8%

=== Racial and ethnic composition ===
Eugene, Oregon – Racial and ethnic composition Note: the US Census treats Hispanic/Latino as an ethnic category. This table excludes Latinos from the racial categories and assigns them to a separate category. Hispanics/Latinos may be of any race.
Race / Ethnicity (NH = Non-Hispanic)	Pop 2000	Pop 2010	Pop 2020	% 2000	% 2010	% 2020
White alone (NH)	118,563	128,031	132,159	85.98%	81.97%	74.81%
Black or African American alone (NH)	1,644	1,955	2,935	1.19%	1.25%	1.66%
Native American or Alaska Native alone (NH)	1,115	1,267	1,351	0.81%	0.81%	0.76%
Asian alone (NH)	4,872	6,205	7,083	3.53%	3.97%	4.01%
Pacific Islander alone (NH)	284	341	516	0.21%	0.22%	0.29%
Other race alone (NH)	315	308	1,157	0.23%	0.20%	0.65%
Mixed Race or Multi-Racial (NH)	4,257	5,878	12,724	3.09%	3.76%	7.20%
Hispanic or Latino (any race)	6,843	12,200	18,729	4.96%	7.81%	10.60%
Total	137,893	156,185	176,654	100.00%	100.00%	100.00%

=== 2020 census ===
As of the 2020 census, Eugene had a population of 176,654. The median age was 36.6 years. 16.6% of residents were under the age of 18 and 18.1% of residents were 65 years of age or older. For every 100 females there were 95.9 males, and for every 100 females age 18 and over there were 94.3 males age 18 and over.

100.0% of residents lived in urban areas, while <0.1% lived in rural areas.

There were 73,534 households in Eugene, of which 22.6% had children under the age of 18 living in them. Of all households, 36.3% were married-couple households, 22.4% were households with a male householder and no spouse or partner present, and 31.4% were households with a female householder and no spouse or partner present. About 33.5% of all households were made up of individuals and 13.8% had someone living alone who was 65 years of age or older. There were 77,395 housing units, of which 5.0% were vacant. Among occupied housing units, 48.4% were owner-occupied and 51.6% were renter-occupied. The homeowner vacancy rate was 0.9% and the rental vacancy rate was 4.7%.

Racial composition as of the 2020 census
Race	Number	Percent
White	137,514	77.8%
Black or African American	3,112	1.8%
American Indian and Alaska Native	2,038	1.2%
Asian	7,207	4.1%
Native Hawaiian and Other Pacific Islander	543	0.3%
Some other race	7,261	4.1%
Two or more races	18,979	10.7%
Hispanic or Latino (of any race)	18,729	10.6%

=== 2010 census ===
According to the 2010 census, Eugene's population was 156,185. The population density was 3,572.2 people per square mile. There were 69,951 housing units at an average density of 1,600 per square mile. Those age 18 and over accounted for 81.8% of the total population.

The racial makeup of the city was 85.8% White, 4.0% Asian, 1.4% Black or African American, 1.0% Native American, 0.2% Pacific Islander, and 4.7% from other races.

Hispanics and Latinos of any race accounted for 7.8% of the total population. Of the non-Hispanics, 82% were White, 1.3% Black or African American, 0.8% Native American, 4% Asian, 0.2% Pacific Islander, 0.2% some other race alone, and 3.4% were of two or more races.

Females represented 51.1% of the total population, and males represented 48.9%. The median age in the city was 33.8 years.

=== 2000 census ===
The census of 2000 showed there were 137,893 people, 58,110 households, and 31,321 families residing in the city of Eugene. The population density was 3,404.8 people per square mile (1,314.6 people/km^{2}). There were 61,444 housing units at an average density of 1,516.4 per square mile (585.5/km^{2}). The racial makeup of the city was 88.15% White, down from 99.5% in 1950, 3.57% Asian, 1.25% Black or African American, 0.93% Native American, 0.21% Pacific Islander, 2.18% from other races, and 3.72% from two or more races. 4.96% of the population were Hispanic or Latino of any race.

There were 58,110 households, of which 25.8% had children under the age of 18 living with them, 40.6% were married couples living together, 9.7% had a female householder with no husband present, and 46.1% were non-families. 31.7% of all households were made up of individuals, and 9.4% had someone living alone who was 65 years of age or older. The average household size was 2.27 and the average family size was 2.87. In the city, the population was 20.3% under the age of 18, 17.3% from 18 to 24, 28.5% from 25 to 44, 21.8% from 45 to 64, and 12.1% who were 65 years of age or older. The median age was 33 years. For every 100 females, there were 96.0 males. For every 100 females age 18 and over, there were 94.0 males. The median income for a household in the city was $35,850, and the median income for a family was $48,527. Males had a median income of $35,549 versus $26,721 for females. The per capita income for the city was $21,315. About 8.7% of families and 17.1% of the population were below the poverty line, including 14.8% of those under age 18 and 7.1% of those age 65 or over.

== Economy ==
Eugene's largest employers are PeaceHealth Medical Group, the University of Oregon, and the Eugene School District. Eugene's largest industries are wood products manufacturing and recreational vehicle manufacturing.

Corporate headquarters for the employee-owned Bi-Mart corporation and family-owned supermarket Market of Choice remain in Eugene.

Many multinational businesses were launched in Eugene. Some of the most famous include Nike, Taco Time, and Broderbund Software.

The footwear repair product Shoe Goo is manufactured by Eclectic Products, based in Eugene.

Run Gum, an energy gum created for runners, also began its life in Eugene. Run Gum was created by track athlete Nick Symmonds and track and field coach Sam Lapray in 2014.

Burley Design LLC produces bicycle trailers and was founded in Eugene by Alan Scholz out of a Saturday Market business in 1978. Eugene is also the birthplace and home of Bike Friday bicycle manufacturer Green Gear Cycling.

Organically Grown Company, the largest distributor of organic fruits and vegetables in the northwest, started in Eugene in 1978 as a non-profit co-op for organic farmers. Notable local food processors, many of which manufacture certified organic products, include Golden Temple (Yogi Tea), Merry Hempsters, Springfield Creamery (Nancy's Yogurt), and Mountain Rose Herbs.

Until July 2008, Hynix Semiconductor America had operated a large semiconductor plant in west Eugene. In late September 2009, Uni-Chem of South Korea announced its intention to purchase the Hynix site for solar cell manufacturing. However, this deal fell through and as of late 2012, is no longer planned. In 2015, semiconductor manufacturer Broadcom purchased the plant with plans to upgrade and reopen it. The company abandoned these plans and put it up for sale in November 2016.

Luckey's Club Cigar Store is one of the oldest bars in Oregon. Tad Luckey Sr. purchased it in 1911, making it one of the oldest businesses in Eugene. The "Club Cigar," as it was called in the late 19th century, was, for many years, a men-only salon. It survived both the Great Depression and Prohibition, partly because Eugene was a "dry town" before the end of Prohibition.

The city has over 25 breweries, offers a variety of dining options with a local focus; the city is surrounded by wineries. The most notable fungi here is the truffle; Eugene hosts the annual Oregon Truffle Festival in January.

=== Top employers ===
According to Eugene's 2017 Comprehensive Annual Financial Report, the city's top employers are:

#	Employer	Number of employees
1	PeaceHealth Medical Group	5,808
2	University of Oregon	5,549
3	Eugene School District 4J	2,553
4	U.S. Government	1,750
5	Lane Community College	1,650
6	Springfield School District	1,610
7	State of Oregon	1,594
8	Lane County	1,567
9	City of Eugene	1,417
10	McKenzie-Willamette Medical Center	898

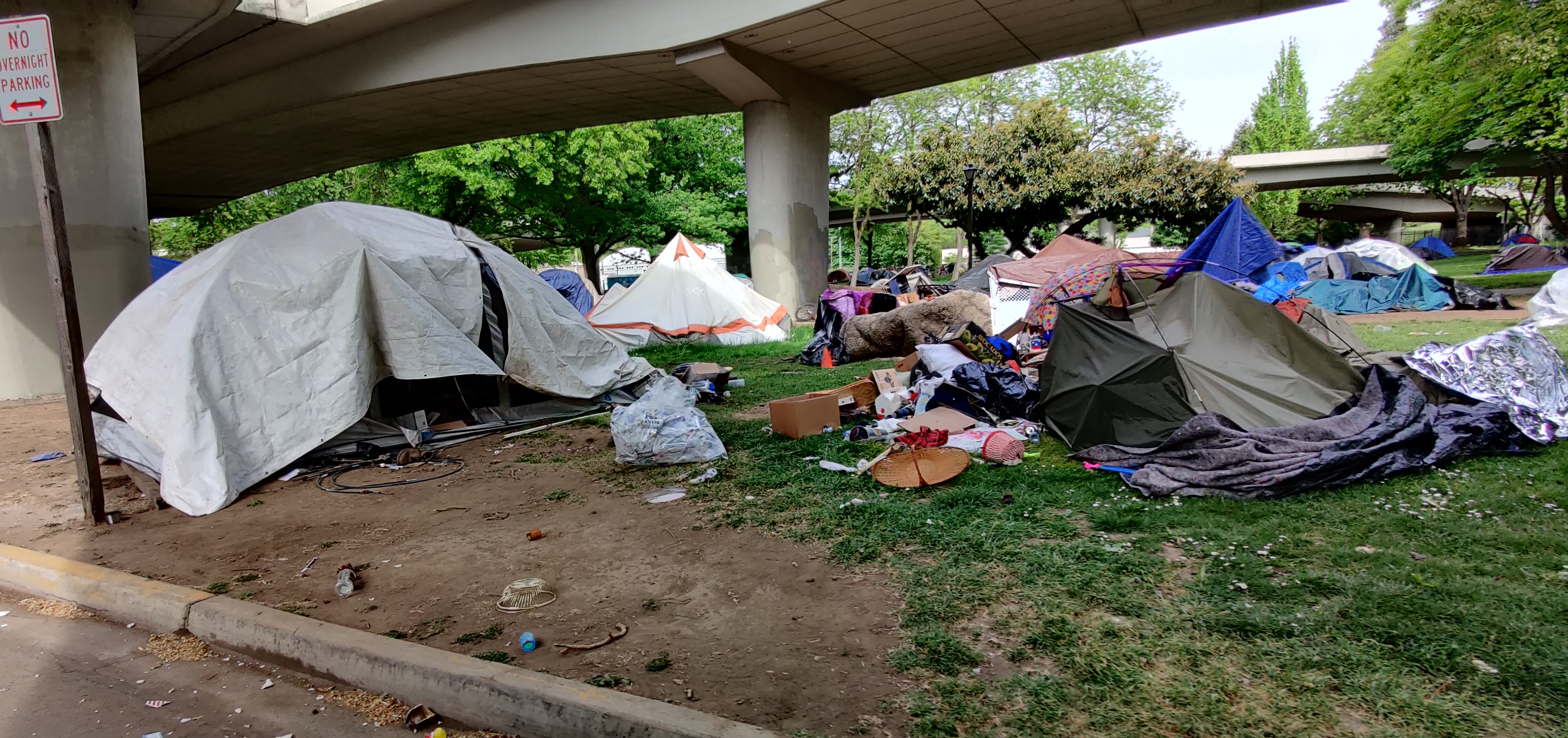
Homeless camp in Eugene, Oregon

=== Homelessness ===
Eugene has a growing homelessness problem, with the highest number of homeless people per capita of any city in the country. During the COVID-19 pandemic, the city experienced a controversy over its continuing policy of homeless removal, despite CDC guidelines to not engage in homeless removal.

== Arts and culture ==
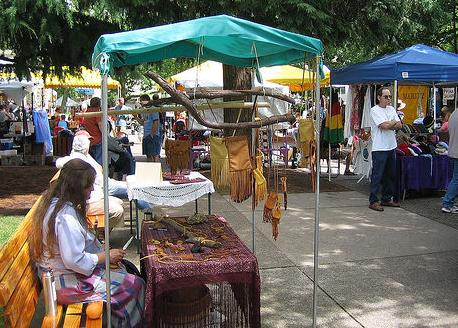
A vendor's craft booth at the Eugene Saturday Market

Eugene is known for its countercultural lifestyle and hippy aesthetic. Beginning in the 1960s, the ideas and viewpoints espoused by area native Ken Kesey became established as the seminal elements of the city's social tapestry. The Merry Prankster, as Kesey was known, is best known as the author of One Flew Over the Cuckoo's Nest and Sometimes a Great Notion. He was also the de facto leader of the Merry Pranksters in Tom Wolfe's biography:The Electric Kool-Aid Acid Test.

In 2005, the city council unanimously approved a new slogan for the city: "World's Greatest City for the Arts & Outdoors". While Eugene has a vibrant arts community for a city its size, and is well situated near many outdoor opportunities, this slogan was frequently criticized by locals as embarrassing and ludicrous. In early 2010, the slogan was changed to "A Great City for the Arts & Outdoors."

Eugene's Saturday Market, open every Saturday from April through November, was founded in 1970 as the first "Saturday Market" in the United States. It is adjacent to the Lane County Farmer's Market in downtown Eugene. All vendors must create or grow all their own products. The market reappears as the "Holiday Market" between Thanksgiving and New Year's in the Lane County Events Center at the fairgrounds.

=== Community ===
Eugene is noted for its "community inventiveness." Many U.S. trends in community development originated in Eugene. The University of Oregon's participatory planning process, known as The Oregon Experiment, was the result of student protests in the early 1970s. The book of the same name is a major document in modern enlightenment thinking in planning and architectural circles. The process, still used by the university in modified form, was created by Christopher Alexander, whose works also directly inspired the creation of the Wiki. Some research for the book A Pattern Language, which inspired the Design Patterns movement and Extreme Programming, was done by Alexander in Eugene. Not coincidentally, those engineering movements also had origins here. Decades after its publication, A Pattern Language is still one of the best-selling books on urban design.

In the 1970s, Eugene was packed with cooperative and community projects. It still has small natural food stores in many neighborhoods, some of the oldest student cooperatives in the country, and alternative schools have been part of the school district since 1971. Growers Market, a volunteer-run food-buying cooperative located near the Amtrak depot, was also founded in 1971. It is possible to see Eugene's non-profit tendencies in much newer projects, such as Square One Villages and the Center for Appropriate Transport. In 2006, an initiative began to create a tenant-run development process for downtown Eugene.

In the fall of 2003, neighbors noticed that "an unassuming two-acre remnant orchard tucked into the Friendly Area Neighborhood" had been put up for sale by its owner, a resident of New York City. Learning that a prospective buyer had plans to build several houses on the property, they formed a non-profit organization called Madison Meadow in June 2004 in order to buy the property and "preserve it as undeveloped space in perpetuity." In 2007 their effort was named Third Best Community Effort by the Eugene Weekly, and by the end of 2008 they had raised enough money to buy the property.

The City of Eugene has an active neighborhood program. Several neighborhoods are known for their green activism. Friendly Neighborhood has a highly popular neighborhood garden established on the right of way of a street never built. There are a number of community gardens on public property. Amazon Neighborhood has a former church turned into a community center. Whiteaker hosts a housing co-op that dates from the early 1970s that has re-purposed both their parking lots into food production and play space. An unusual eco-village with natural building techniques and large shared garden can be found in Jefferson Westside neighborhood. A several block area in the River Road Neighborhood is known as a permaculture hotspot with an increasing number of suburban homes trading grass for garden, installing rain water catchment systems, food producing landscapes and solar retrofits. Several sites have planted gardens by removing driveways. Citizen volunteers are working with the City of Eugene to restore a 65-tree filbert grove on public property. There are deepening social and economic networks in the neighborhood.

=== Annual cultural events ===
- Asian Celebration, presented by the Asian Council of Eugene and Springfield, takes place in late July at Alton Baker Park. The festival was changed to an outdoor venue after the start of the COVID-19 pandemic.
- The KLCC Microbrew Festival is held in February at the Lane County Fairgrounds. It provides participants with an introduction to a large range of microbrewery and craft beers, which play an important role in Pacific Northwest culture and the economy.
- Mount Pisgah Arboretum, which resides at the base of Mount Pisgah, holds a Wildflower Festival in May and a Mushroom Festival and Plant Sale in October.
- Oregon Festival of American Music, or OFAM is held annually in the early summer.
- The Oregon Bach Festival is a major international festival in July, hosted by the University of Oregon.
- The nonprofit Oregon Country Fair takes place in July in nearby Veneta.
- The Lane County Fair occurs in July at the Lane County Fairgrounds.
- The annual Eugene/Springfield Pride Festival was started in 1993, and is part of LGBT culture in Eugene.
- Eugene Celebration is a three-day block party that usually takes place in the downtown area in August or September. The SLUG Queen coronation in August, a pageant with a campy spin, crowns a new SLUG Queen who "rains" over the Eugene Celebration Parade and is an unofficial ambassador of Eugene.

=== Museums ===
Eugene museums include the University of Oregon's Jordan Schnitzer Museum of Art and Museum of Natural and Cultural History, the Oregon Air and Space Museum, Lane County History Museum, Maude Kerns Art Center, Shelton McMurphey Johnson House, and the Eugene Science Center.

=== Performing arts ===
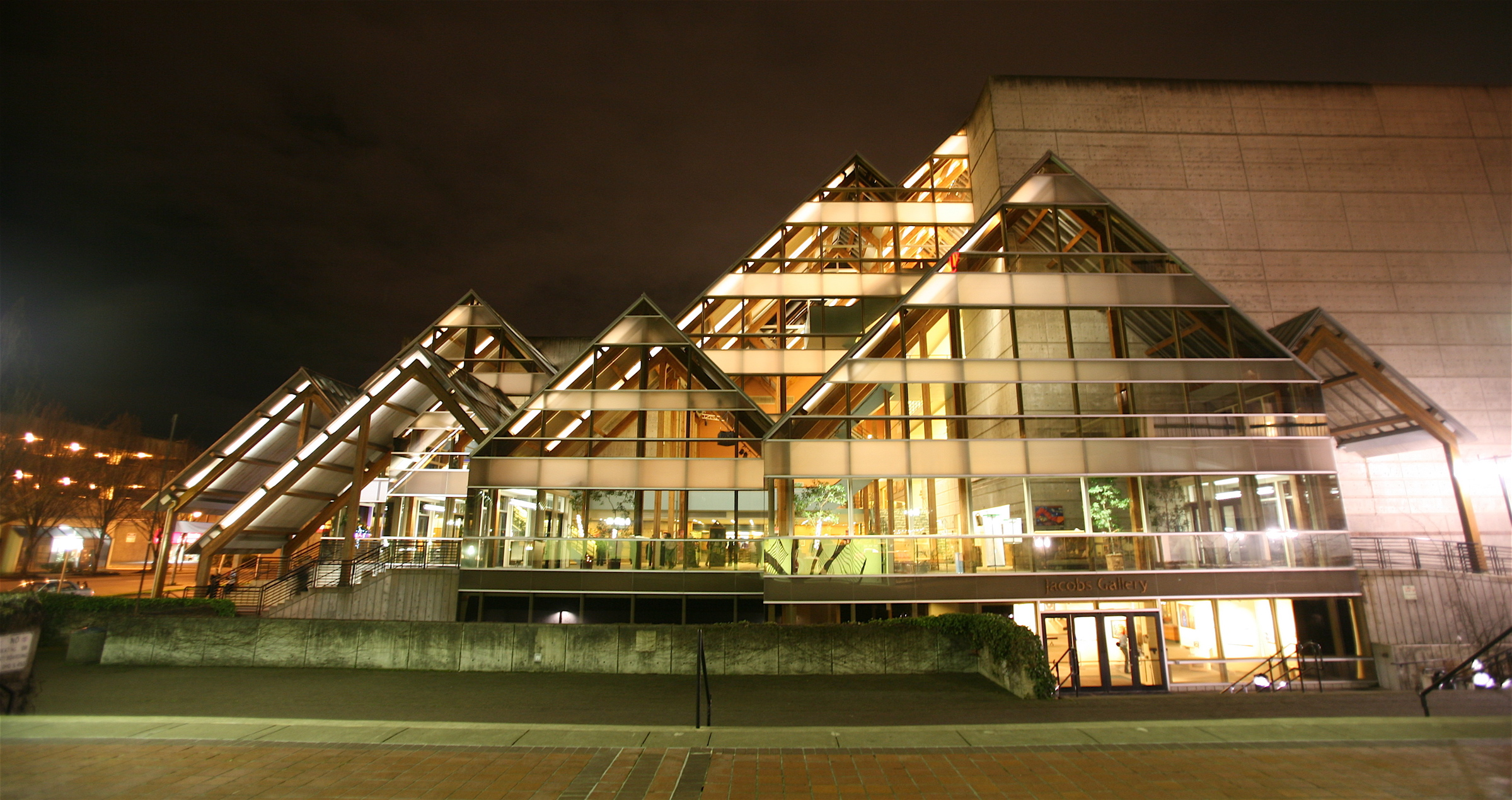
The Hult Center for the Performing Arts

Eugene is home to numerous cultural organizations, including the Eugene Symphony (whose previous music directors include Marin Alsop, Giancarlo Guerrero, and Miguel Harth-Bedoya); the Eugene Ballet, a professional full-time touring company; the Eugene Opera, the Eugene Concert Choir, the Bushnell University Community Choir, the Oregon Mozart Players, the Oregon Bach Festival, the Oregon Children's Choir, the Eugene-Springfield Youth Orchestras, Ballet Fantastique and Oregon Festival of American Music. Principal performing arts venues include the Hult Center for the Performing Arts, The John G. Shedd Institute for the Arts ("The Shedd"), the McDonald Theatre, and W.O.W. Hall.

The University of Oregon School of Music and Dance also attracts world class performers and teaching artists throughout the year, many of whom perform at Beall Concert Hall. The university campus also frequently hosts performances at Matthew Knight Arena and the Erb Memorial Union ballroom.

A number of live theater groups are based in Eugene, including Free Shakespeare in the Park, Oregon Contemporary Theatre, The Very Little Theatre, Actors Cabaret, LCC Theatre, Rose Children's Theatre, and University Theatre. Each has its own performance venue.

==== Music ====
Because of its status as a college town, Eugene has been home to many music genres, musicians and bands, ranging from electronic dance music such as dubstep and drum and bass to garage rock, hip-hop, folk and heavy metal. Eugene also has growing reggae and street-performing bluegrass and jug band scenes. Multi-genre act the Cherry Poppin' Daddies became a prominent figure in Eugene's music scene and became the house band at Eugene's W.O.W. Hall. In the late 1990s, their contributions to the swing revival movement propelled them to national stardom. Rock band Floater originated in Eugene as did the Robert Cray blues band. Doom metal band YOB is among the leaders of the Eugene heavy music scene.

Eugene is home to "Classical Gas" composer and two-time Grammy award winner Mason Williams who spent his years as a youth living between his parents in Oakridge, Oregon and Oklahoma. Mason Williams puts on a yearly Christmas show at the Hult center for performing arts with a full orchestra produced by author, audio engineer and University of Oregon professor Don Latarski.

Dick Hyman, noted jazz pianist and musical director for many of Woody Allen's films, designs and hosts the annual Now Hear This! jazz festival at the Oregon Festival of American Music (OFAM). OFAM and the Hult Center routinely draw major jazz talent for concerts.

Eugene is also home to a large Zimbabwean music community, home to the Kutsinhira Cultural Arts Center "dedicated to the music and people of Zimbabwe". It was founded in 1990.

The city of Eugene is mentioned in the Johnny Cash song "Lumberjack".

=== Visual arts ===
Eugene's visual arts community is supported by over 20 private art galleries and several organizations, including Maude Kerns Art Center, Lane Arts Council, DIVA (the Downtown Initiative for the Visual Arts) and the Eugene Glass School.

In 2015 installations from a group of Eugene-based artists known as Light At Play were showcased in several events around the world as part of the International Year of Light, including displays at the Smithsonian and the National Academy of Sciences.

=== Film ===
The Eugene area has been used as a filming location for several Hollywood films, most famously for 1978's National Lampoon's Animal House, which was also filmed in nearby Cottage Grove. John Belushi had the idea for the film The Blues Brothers during filming of Animal House when he happened to meet Curtis Salgado at what was then the Eugene Hotel.

Getting Straight, starring Elliott Gould and Candice Bergen, was filmed at Lane Community College in 1969. As the campus was still under construction at the time, the "occupation scenes" were easier to shoot.

The "Chicken Salad on Toast" scene in the 1970 Jack Nicholson movie Five Easy Pieces was filmed at the Denny's restaurant at the southern I-5 freeway interchange near Glenwood. Nicholson directed the 1971 film Drive, He Said in Eugene.

How to Beat the High Cost of Living, starring Jane Curtin, Jessica Lange and Susan Saint James, was filmed in Eugene in the fall of 1979. Locations visible in the film include Valley River Center (which is a driving force in the plot), Skinner Butte and Ya-Po-Ah Terrace, the Willamette River and River Road Hardware.

Several track and field movies have used Eugene as a setting and/or a filming location. Personal Best, starring Mariel Hemingway, was filmed in Eugene in 1982. The film centered on a group of women who are trying to qualify for the Olympic track and field team. Two track and field movies about the life of Steve Prefontaine, Prefontaine and Without Limits, were released within a year of each other in 1997–1998. Kenny Moore, Eugene-trained Olympic runner and co-star in Prefontaine, co-wrote the screenplay for Without Limits. Prefontaine was filmed in Washington because the Without Limits production bought out Hayward Field for the summer to prevent its competition from shooting there. Kenny Moore also wrote a biography of Bill Bowerman, played in Without Limits by Donald Sutherland back in Eugene 20 years after he had appeared in Animal House. Moore had also had a role in Personal Best.

Stealing Time, a 2003 independent film, was partially filmed in Eugene. When the film premiered in June 2001 at the Seattle International Film Festival, it was titled Rennie's Landing after a popular bar near the University of Oregon campus. The title was changed for its DVD release.

The 2006 film Zerophilia was partly filmed in Eugene.

The 2016 film Tracktown was about a distance runner training for the Olympics was filmed in Eugene.

=== Religion ===
Religious institutions of higher learning in Eugene include Bushnell University and New Hope Christian College. Bushnell University (formerly Northwest Christian University), founded in 1895, has ties with the Christian Church (Disciples of Christ). New Hope Christian College (formerly Eugene Bible College) originated with the Bible Standard Conference in 1915, which joined with Open Bible Evangelistic Association to create Open Bible Standard Churches in 1932. Eugene Bible College was started from this movement by Fred Hornshuh in 1925.

There are two Eastern Orthodox Church parishes in Eugene: St John the Wonderworker Orthodox Christian Church in the Historic Whiteaker Neighborhood and Saint George Greek Orthodox Church.

There are six Roman Catholic parishes in Eugene as well: St. Mary Catholic Church, St. Jude Catholic Church, St. Mark Catholic Church, St. Peter Catholic Church, St. Paul Catholic Church, and St. Thomas More Catholic Church.

Eugene also has a Ukrainian Catholic Church named Nativity of the Mother of God.

There is a mainline Protestant contingency in the city as well—such as the largest of the Lutheran Churches, Central Lutheran near the U of O Campus and the Episcopal Church of the Resurrection.

The Eugene area has a sizeable LDS Church presence, with three stakes, consisting of 23 congregations (wards and branches). The Church of Jesus Christ announced plans in April 2020 to build a temple in Eugene.

The greater Eugene-Springfield area also has a Jehovah's Witnesses presence with five Kingdom Halls, several having multiple congregations in one Kingdom Hall.

The Reconstructionist Temple Beth Israel is Eugene's largest Jewish congregation. It was also, for many decades, Eugene's only synagogue, until Orthodox members broke away in 1992 and formed "Congregation Ahavas Torah".

Eugene has a community of some 140 Sikhs, who have established a Sikh temple.

Eugene has a Baháʼí Faith center.

The 340-member congregation of the Unitarian Universalist Church in Eugene (UUCE) purchased the former Eugene Scottish Rite Temple in May 2010, renovated it, and began services there in September 2012.

Saraha Nyingma Buddhist Temple in Eugene opened in 2012 in the former site of the Unitarian Universalist Church.

The First Congregational Church is a large progressive Christian Church with a long history of justice focused ministries and a very active membership. In 2019, the congregation coordinated with the Connections Program of the St. Vincent DePaul organization to provide transitional homes for two homeless families which were on the church's property. Through support and training life-skills and a more stable housing situation, these families were then able to make their way into independent living.

== Sports ==
Eugene markets itself as "Track Town USA". There are close links between the University of Oregon's successful track & field program, the Oregon Track Club, and Nike, Inc, who were founded by University of Oregon track athlete Phil Knight and his coach, Bill Bowerman.

Eugene's miles of running trails, through its unusually large park system, are among the most extensive in the U.S. Notable trails include Pre's Trail in Alton Baker Park, Rexius Trail, the Adidas Oregon Trail, and the Ridgeline Trail. There is also an extensive network of trails along the Willamette River that reaches into neighboring Springfield, as well as along Amazon Creek in the southern and western parts of town.

Jogging was introduced to the U.S. through Eugene, brought from New Zealand by Bill Bowerman, who wrote the best-selling book "Jogging", and coached the champion University of Oregon track and cross country teams. During Bowerman's tenure, his "Men of Oregon" won 24 individual NCAA titles, including titles in 15 out of the 19 events contested. During Bowerman's 24 years at Oregon, his track teams finished in the top ten at the NCAA championships 16 times, including four team titles (1962, '64, '65, '70), and two second-place trophies. His teams also posted a dual meet record of 114–20.

Bowerman also invented the waffle sole for running shoes in Eugene, and with Oregon alumnus Phil Knight founded shoe giant Nike. The city has dozens of running clubs. The climate is cool and temperate, good both for jogging and record-setting. Eugene is home to the University of Oregon's Hayward Field track, which hosts numerous collegiate and amateur track and field meets throughout the year, most notably the Prefontaine Classic. Hayward Field was host to the 2004 AAU Junior Olympic Games, the 1989 World Masters Athletics Championships, the track and field events of the 1998 World Masters Games, the 2006 Pacific-10 track and field championships, the 1971, 1975, 1986, 1993, 1999, 2001, 2009, and 2011 USA Track & Field Outdoor Championships and the 1972, 1976, 1980, 2008, 2012, and 2016 U.S. Olympic trials. Eugene was the host of the delayed 2021 World Athletics Championships. The city bid for the 2019 event but lost narrowly to Doha, Qatar.

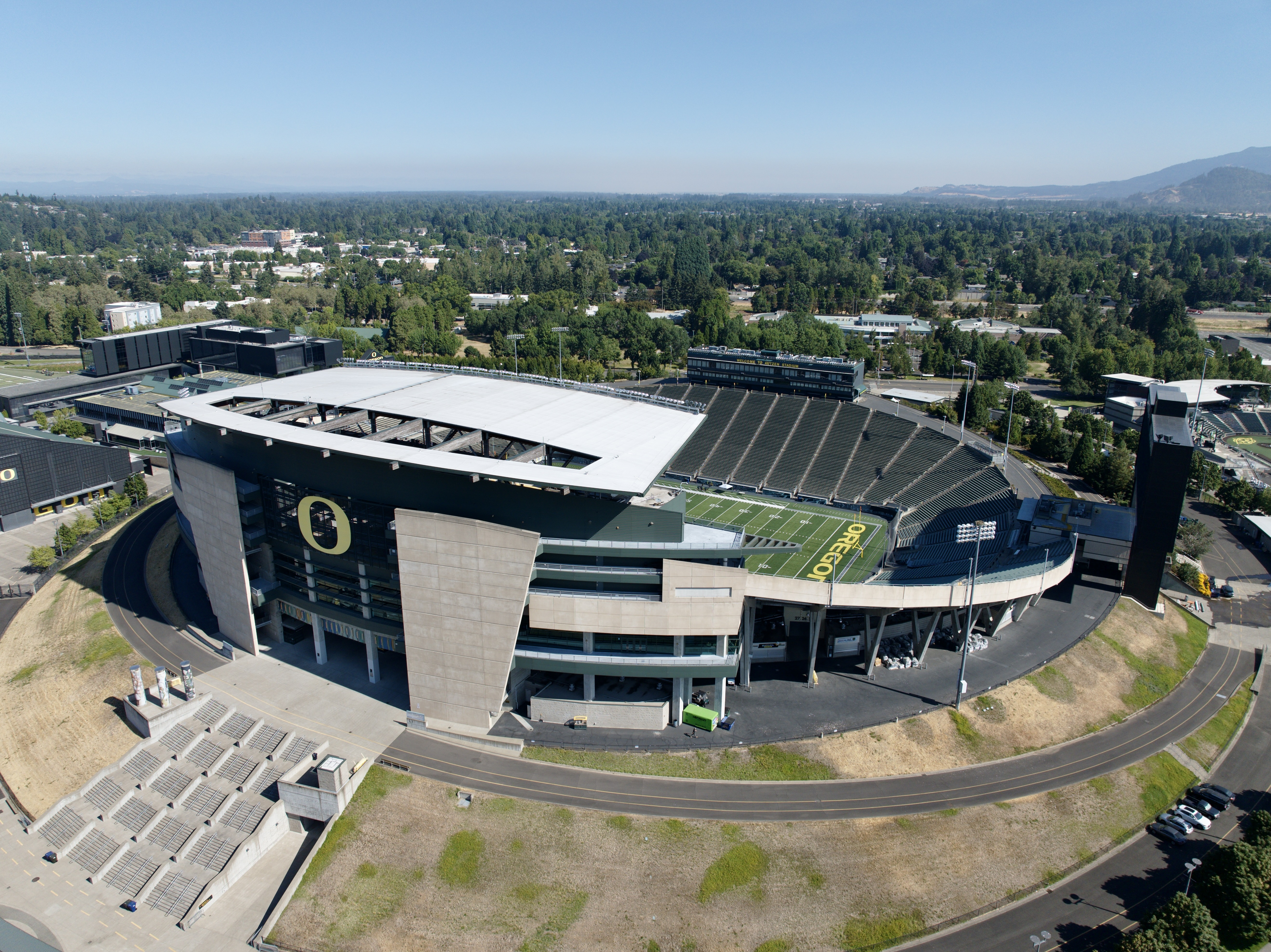
Eugene's Autzen Stadium

Eugene's Oregon Ducks are part of the Big Ten Conference. American football is especially popular, with intense rivalries between the Ducks and both the Oregon State University Beavers and the University of Washington Huskies. Autzen Stadium is home to Duck football, with a seating capacity of 54,000 but has had over 60,000 with standing room only. The basketball arena, McArthur Court, was built in 1926. The arena was replaced by the Matthew Knight Arena in late 2010.

The Nationwide Tour's golfing event Oregon Classic takes place at Shadow Hills Country Club, just north of Eugene. The event has been played every year since 1998, except in 2001 when it was slated to begin the day after the 9/11 terrorist attacks. The top 20 players from the Nationwide Tour are promoted to the PGA Tour for the following year.

Eugene is also home to the Eugene Emeralds, a short-season Class A minor-league baseball team. The "Ems" play their home games in PK Park, also the home of the University of Oregon baseball team. The Eugene Jr. Generals, a Tier III Junior "A" ice hockey team belonging to the Northern Pacific Hockey League (NPHL) consisting of 8 teams throughout Oregon and Washington, plays at the Lane County Ice Center. Lane United FC, a soccer club that participates in the Northwest Division of USL League Two, was founded in 2013 and plays its home games at Civic Park.

The following table lists some sports clubs in Eugene and their usual home venue:

Club	Sport	Founded	League	Venue
University of Oregon Ducks	Football, Basketball, Track and Field, Softball, Volleyball, Golf, Tennis, Baseball, Lacrosse, Ice hockey, Soccer, Ultimate	1876	National Collegiate Athletic Association: Big Ten Conference	Autzen Stadium, Matthew Knight Arena, PK Park, Hayward Field
Bushnell University Beacons	Baseball, Basketball, Beach Volleyball, Cross Country, Distance Track, Golf, Soccer, Softball, Volleyball	1895	National Association of Intercollegiate Athletics, Cascade Collegiate Conference	Morse Event Center
New Hope Christian College Deacons	Basketball, Soccer, Volleyball	1925		Rexius Event Center
Eugene Emeralds	Baseball	1955	Northwest League	PK Park
Lane Community College Titans	Basketball, Cross Country, Track and Field, Soccer, Baseball	1965	Northwest Athletic Association of Community Colleges	Lane Community College
Eugene Gentlemen	Rugby	1973	Pacific Northwest Rugby Football Union	
Eugene Chargers	Basketball	2006	International Basketball League	Morse Event Center
Eugene Generals	Ice hockey	2005	Junior A Tier III-League Hockey: Northern Pacific Hockey League	Lane County Ice Center
Lane United FC	Soccer	2013	USL League Two	Civic Park

== Parks and recreation ==
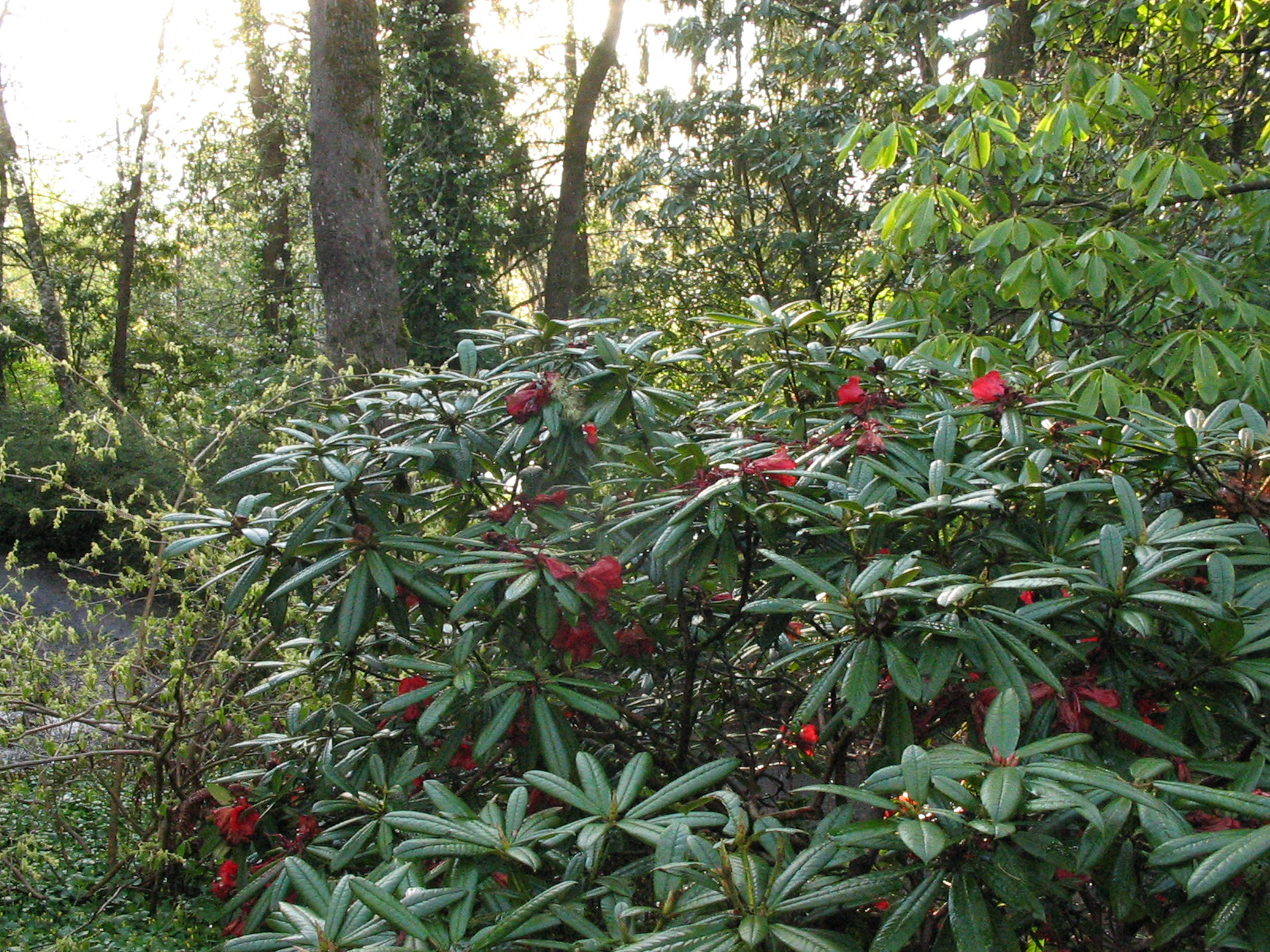
Hendricks Park

Spencer Butte Park at the southern edge of town provides access to Spencer Butte, a dominant feature of Eugene's skyline. Hendricks Park, situated on a knoll to the east of downtown, is known for its rhododendron garden and nearby memorial to Steve Prefontaine, known as Pre's Rock, where the legendary University of Oregon runner was killed in an auto accident. Alton Baker Park, next to the Willamette River, contains Pre's Trail. Also next to the Willamette are Skinner Butte Park and the Owen Memorial Rose Garden, which contains more than 4,500 roses of over 400 varieties, as well as the 150-year-old Black Tartarian Cherry tree, an Oregon Heritage Tree.

The city of Eugene maintains an urban forest. The University of Oregon campus is an arboretum, with over 500 species of trees. The city operates and maintains scenic hiking trails that pass through and across the ridges of a cluster of hills in the southern portion of the city, on the fringe of residential neighborhoods. Some trails allow biking, and others are for hikers and runners only.

The nearest ski resort, Willamette Pass, is an hour from Eugene by car. On the way, along Oregon Route 58, are several reservoirs and lakes, the Oakridge mountain bike trails, hot springs, and waterfalls within Willamette National Forest. Eugene residents also frequent the Hoodoo and Mount Bachelor ski resorts. The Three Sisters Wilderness, the Oregon Dunes National Recreation Area, and Smith Rock are just a short drive away.

== Government ==
In 1944, Eugene adopted a council–manager form of government, replacing the day-to-day management of city affairs by the part-time mayor and volunteer city council with a full-time professional city manager. The subsequent history of Eugene city government has largely been one of the dynamics—often contentious—between the city manager, the mayor and city council.

According to statute, all Eugene and Lane County elections are officially non-partisan, with a primary containing all candidates in May. If a candidate gets more than 50% of the vote in the primary, they win the election outright, otherwise the top two candidates face off in a November runoff. This allows candidates to win seats during the lower-turnout primary election.

The mayor of Eugene is Kaarin Knudson, who took office in January 2025. Recent mayors include Edwin Cone (1958–69), Les Anderson (1969–77) Gus Keller (1977–84), Brian Obie (1985–88), Jeff Miller (1989–92), Ruth Bascom (1993–96), Jim Torrey (1997–2004), Kitty Piercy (2005–2017), and Lucy Vinis (2017–25).

=== Eugene City Council ===
Mayor: Kaarin Knudson

- Ward 1 – Eliza Kashinsky
- Ward 2 – Matt Keating
- Ward 3 – Alan Zelenka
- Ward 4 – Jennifer Yeh
- Ward 5 – Mike Clark
- Ward 6 – Greg Evans
- Ward 7 – Lyndsie Leech
- Ward 8 – Randy Groves

=== Public safety ===
The Eugene Police Department is the city's law enforcement and public safety agency. The Lane County Sheriff's Office also has its headquarters in Eugene.

The University of Oregon is served by the University of Oregon Police Department, and Eugene Police Department also has a police station in the West University District near campus. Lane Community College is served by the Lane Community College Public Safety Department. The Oregon State Police have a presence in the rural areas and highways around the Eugene metro area. The LTD downtown station, and the EmX lines are patrolled by LTD Transit Officers. Since 1989 the mental health crisis intervention non-governmental agency CAHOOTS has responded to Eugene's mental health 911 calls.

Eugene-Springfield Fire Department is the agency responsible for emergency medical services, fire suppression, HAZMAT operations and water/Confined spaces rescues in the combined Eugene-Springfield metropolitan area.

Eugene used to have an ordinance which prohibited car horn usage for non-driving purposes. After several residents were cited for this offense during the anti-Gulf War demonstrations in January 1991, the city was taken to court and in 1992 the Oregon Court of Appeals overturned the ordinance, finding it unconstitutionally vague. Eugene City Hall was abandoned in 2012 for reasons of structural integrity, energy efficiency, and obsolete size. The building was subsequently dismantled in 2014-15. A building previously owned by the Eugene Water and Electric Board (EWEB) was purchased and moved into by the city in 2024, with the grand opening of the new Eugene City Hall taking place on July 18, 2024.

The City of Eugene and Eugene Police Department signed a contract with surveillance camera company Flock Safety in 2024, with camera installation beginning in May 2025. The deployment drew criticism from the American Civil Liberties Union (ACLU) and community members, leading to the formation of Eyes Off Eugene, a local activist group dedicated to researching the cameras and their vulnerabilities. The group presented their findings at Eugene city council meetings, eventually leading to the city cancelling their contract with Flock Safety in December 2025.

=== Politics ===
Being the largest city by far in Lane County, Eugene's voters almost always decide the county's partisan tilt. While Eugene has historically been a counter-culture-heavy and left-leaning college town, the county's partisan leanings have intensified in recent decades, mirroring the general polarization of Oregon voters along urban (pro-Democratic) and rural (pro-Republican) lines.

Lane County voted for Bernie Sanders over eventual 2016 nominee Hillary Clinton by 60.6-38.1%, and Eugene offered Sanders an even larger share of its vote.

== Education ==
=== Tertiary education ===
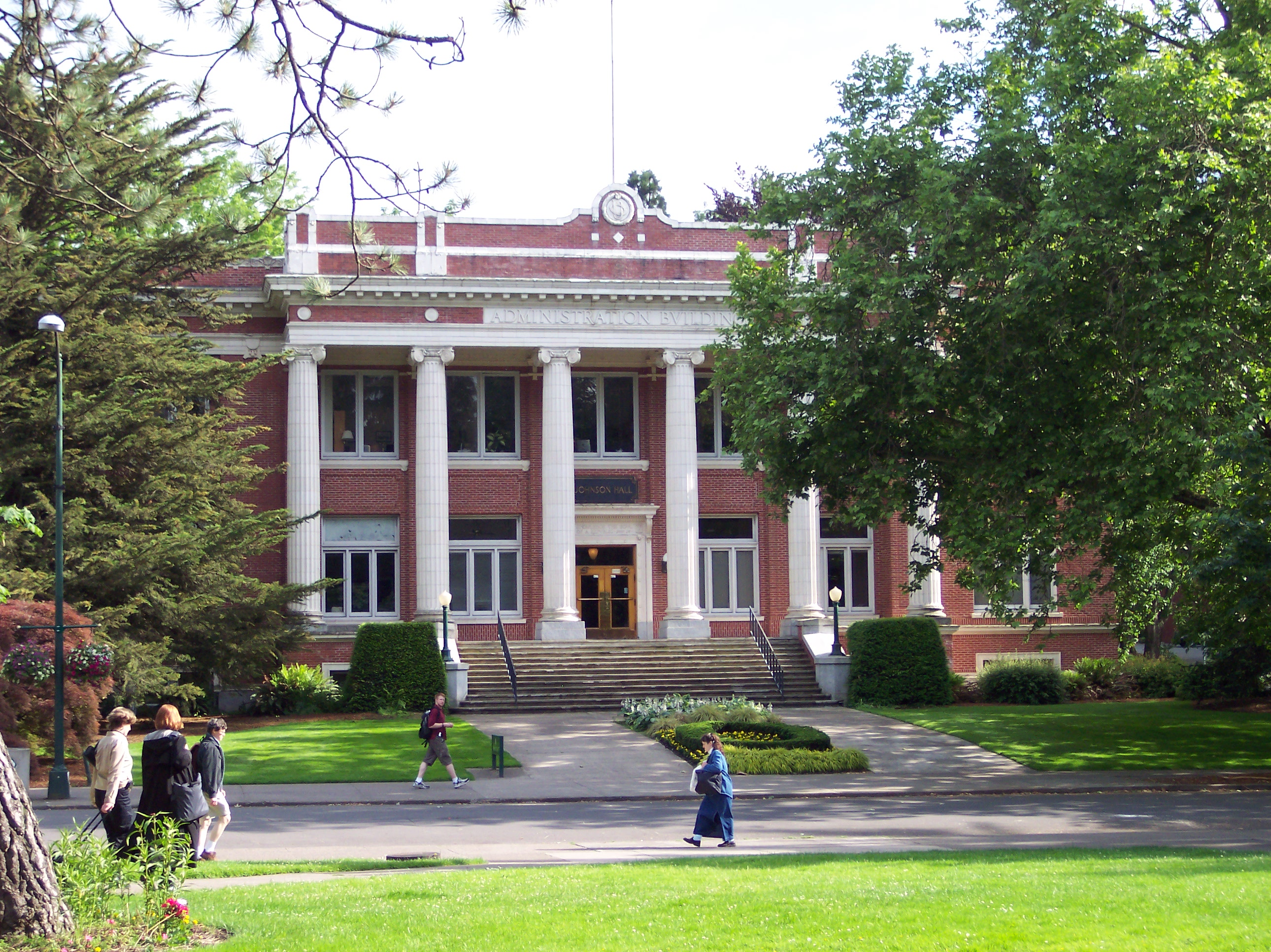
Johnson Hall, University of Oregon

Eugene is home to the University of Oregon. Other institutions of higher learning include Bushnell University, Lane Community College, New Hope Christian College, Gutenberg College, and Pacific University's Eugene campus.

All of Lane County is in the Lane Community College district.

=== Schools ===
The Eugene School District covers around 85% of the Eugene city limits. The remainder of Eugene's northwestern neighborhoods are in the Bethel School District.

The Eugene School District includes four full-service high schools (Churchill, North Eugene, Sheldon, and South Eugene) and many alternative education programs, such as international schools and charter schools. Foreign language immersion programs in the district are available in Spanish, French, Chinese, and Japanese.

The Bethel School District serves children in the Bethel neighborhood on the northwest edge of Eugene. The district is home to the traditional Willamette High School and the alternative Kalapuya High School. There are 11 schools in this district.

Eugene also has several private schools, including the Eugene Waldorf School, the Outdoor High School, Eugene Montessori, Far Horizon Montessori, Eugene Sudbury School, Wellsprings Friends School, Oak Hill School, and The Little French School.

Parochial schools in Eugene include Marist Catholic High School, O'Hara Catholic Elementary School, Eugene Christian School, and St. Paul Parish School.

=== Libraries ===
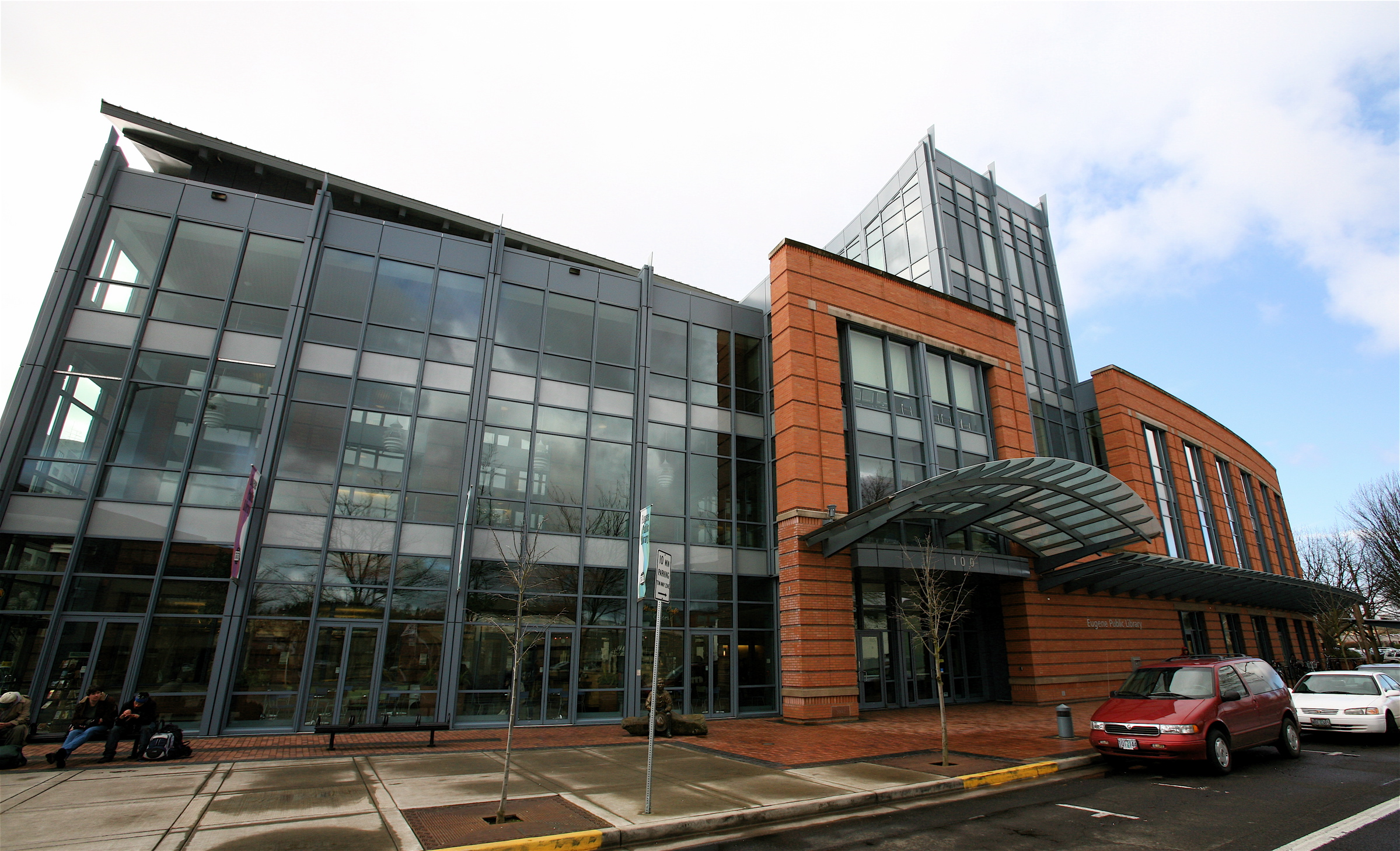
The Eugene Public Library

The largest library in Oregon is the University of Oregon's Knight Library, with collections totaling more than 3 million volumes and over 100,000 audio and video items. The Eugene Public Library moved into a new, larger building downtown in 2002. The four-story library is an increase from 38,000 to 130,000 square feet (3,500 to 12,100 m^{2}). There are also two branches of the Eugene Public Library, the Sheldon Branch Library in the neighborhood of Cal Young/Sheldon, and the Bethel Branch Library, in the neighborhood of Bethel. Eugene also has the Lane County Law Library.

== Media ==
=== Print ===
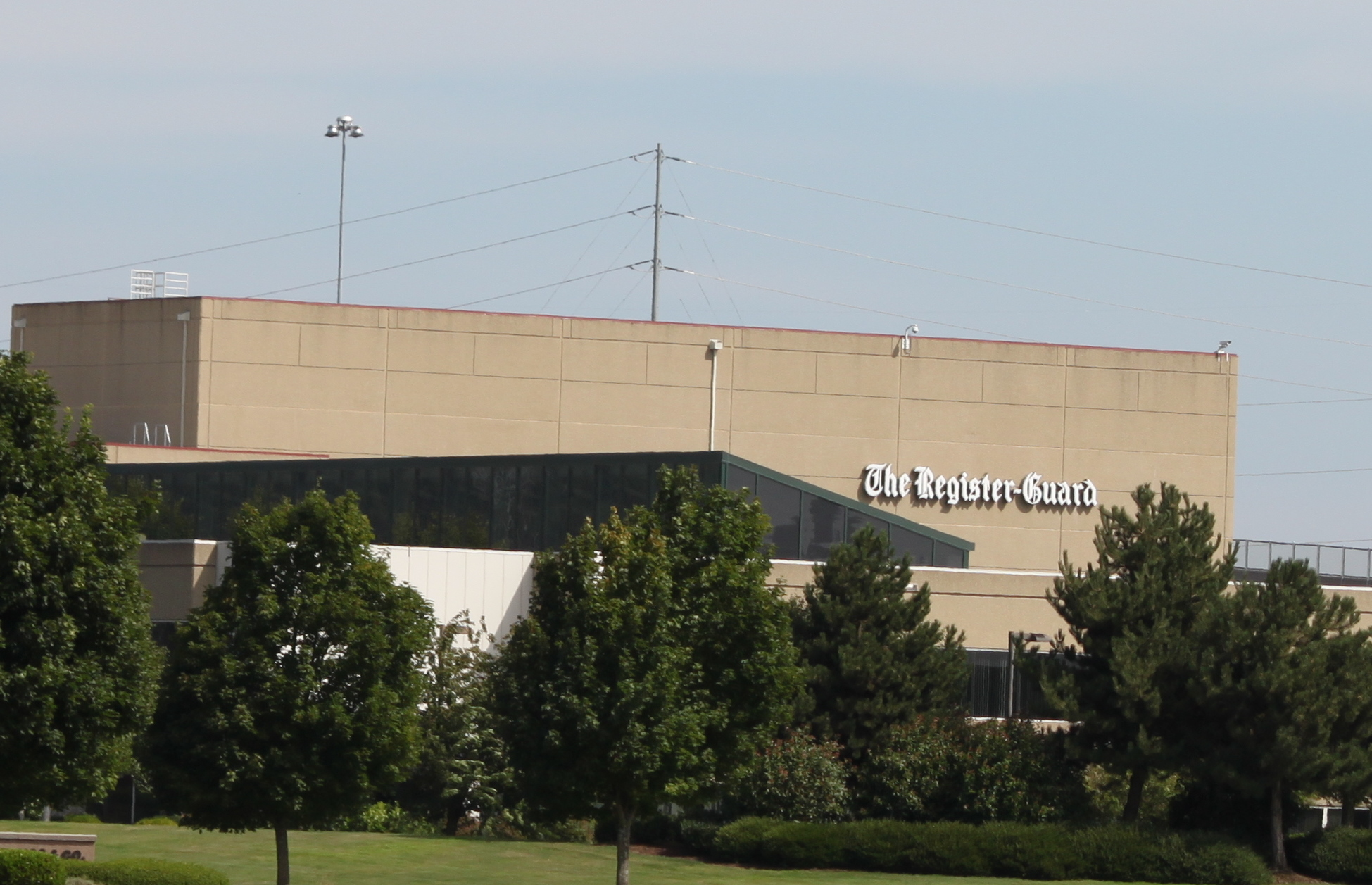
The Register-Guard building

The largest newspaper serving the area is The Register-Guard, a daily newspaper with a circulation of about 70,000, published independently by the Baker family of Eugene until 2018, before being acquired by GateHouse Media, (now owned by Gannett Company). Other newspapers serving the area include the Eugene Weekly, the Emerald, the student-run independent newspaper at the University of Oregon, now published on Mondays and Thursdays;The Torch, the student-run newspaper at Lane Community College, the Ignite, the newspaper at New Hope Christian College and The Beacon Bolt, the student-run newspaper at Bushnell University. Eugene Magazine, Lifestyle Quarterly, Eugene Living, and Sustainable Home and Garden magazines also serve the area. Adelante Latino is a Spanish language newspaper in Eugene that serves all of Lane County.

=== Television ===
Local television stations include KMTR (NBC/The CW), KVAL (CBS), KLSR-TV (Fox), KEVU-CD, KEZI (ABC), KEPB (PBS), and KTVC (independent).

- KEZI (channel 9) (ABC)
- KVAL (channel 13) (CBS)
- KMTR (channel 16) (NBC/The CW)
- KEVU-CD (channel 23)
- KEPB (channel 28) (PBS)
- KLSR (channel 34) (Fox)
- KTVC (channel 36) (independent)
- KHWB-LD (channel 38) (TBN)

=== Radio ===
The local NPR affiliates are KOPB and KLCC. Radio station KRVM-AM is an affiliate of Jefferson Public Radio, based at Southern Oregon University. The Pacifica Radio affiliate is the University of Oregon student-run radio station, KWVA. Additionally, the community supports two other radio stations: KWAX (classical) and KRVM-FM (alternative).

AM stations

- KOAC 550 Corvallis – NPR News/Talk (Oregon Public Broadcasting)
- KUGN 590 Eugene – NEWS/TALK (Cumulus)
- KXOR 660 Junction City – Spanish Religious (Zion Media)
- KKNX 840 Eugene – Classic Hits (Mielke Broadcasting)
- KORE 1050 Springfield – FOX Sports Radio
- KPNW 1120 Eugene – NEWS/TALK (Bicoastal Media)
- KRVM 1280 Eugene – NPR News/Talk (Eugene School District) (JPR affiliate)
- KNND 1400 Cottage Grove – Classic Country (Reiten Communications Inc)
- KEED 1450 Eugene – Classic Country (Mielke Broadcasting)
- KOPB 1600 Eugene – NPR News/Talk (Oregon Public Broadcasting)

FM stations

- KWVA 88.1 Eugene – Freeform (University of Oregon)
- KPIJ 88.5 Junction City – Christian (Calvary Satellite Network) (Calvary Chapel)
- KQFE 88.9 Springfield – Christian (Family Radio)
- KLCC 89.7 Eugene – NPR News/Talk/Jazz (Lane Community College)
- KWAX 91.1 Eugene – Classical (University of Oregon)
- KRVM 91.9 Eugene – Adult Album Alternative (AAA) (Eugene School District)
- KKNU 93.3 Springfield – Country (McKenzie River Broadcasting)
- KMGE 94.5 Eugene – Adult Contemporary (McKenzie River Broadcasting)
- KUJZ 95.3 Creswell – Sports (Cumulus)
- KZEL 96.1 Eugene – Classic Rock (Cumulus)
- KEPW-LP 97.3 Eugene - PeaceWorks Community Radio (Eugene PeaceWorks)
- KEQB 97.7 Coburg - Regional Mexican (McKenzie River Broadcasting)
- KODZ 99.1 Eugene – '90s/'00s Hits (Bicoastal Media)
- KRKT 99.9 Albany – Country (Bicoastal Media)
- KMME 100.5 Cottage Grove – Catholic Program (Catholic Radio Northwest)
- KFLY 101.5 Corvallis - Country (Bicoastal Media)
- KEHK 102.3 Brownsville – Hot Adult Contemporary (Cumulus)
- KNRQ 103.7 Harrisburg – Alternative Rock (Cumulus)
- KDUK 104.7 Florence – Top 40 (CHR) (Bicoastal Media)
- KEUG 105.5 Veneta – Adult Hits (McKenzie River Broadcasting)
- KLOO 106.3 Corvallis – Classic Rock (Bicoastal Media)
- KLVU 107.1 Sweet Home – Contemporary Christian Music (K-LOVE) Educational Media Foundation
- KHPE 107.9 Albany – Contemporary Christian Music (Extra Mile Media)

== Infrastructure ==
=== Transportation ===
==== Bus ====
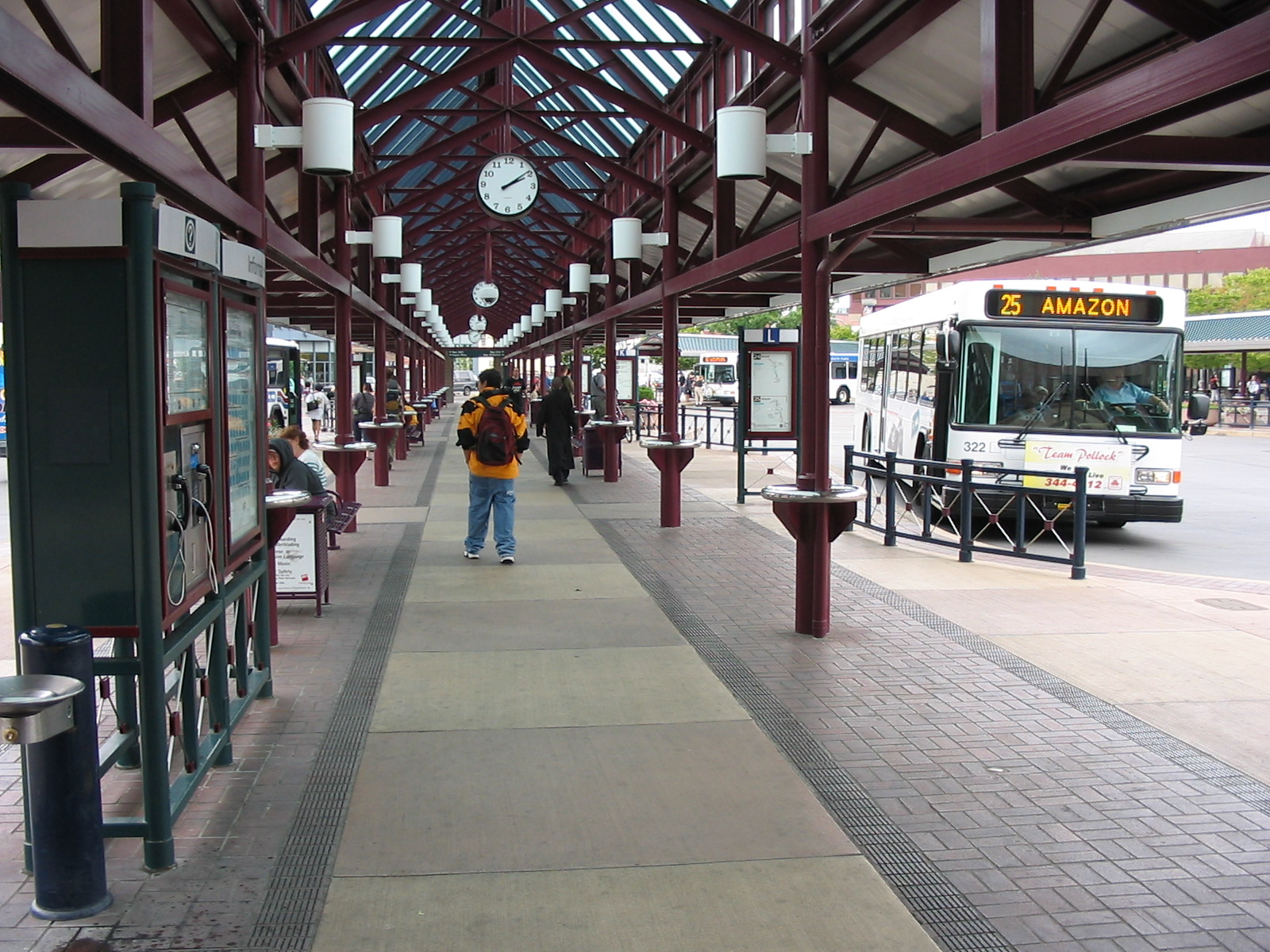
Lane Transit District's Eugene Station

Lane Transit District (LTD), a public transportation agency formed in 1970, covers 240 square miles (620 km^{2}) of Lane County, including Creswell, Cottage Grove, Junction City, Veneta, and Blue River. Operating more than 90 buses during peak hours, LTD carries riders on 3.7 million trips every year. LTD also operates a bus rapid transit line that runs between Eugene and Springfield—Emerald Express (EmX)—much of which runs in its own lane, with stations providing for off-board fare payment. LTD's main terminus in Eugene is at the Eugene Station. LTD also offers paratransit.

Greyhound Lines provides service between Los Angeles and Portland on the I-5 corridor. Pacific Crest Bus Lines provide scheduled intercity services to Bend, Medford, and Florence.

==== Cycling ====
Cycling is popular in Eugene and many people commute via bicycle. Summertime events and festivals frequently have valet bicycle parking corrals that are often filled to capacity by three hundred or more bikes. Many people commute to work by bicycle every month of the year. PeaceHealth Rides, a bike share system formerly operated by Uber subsidiary JUMP, and currently operated by non-profit Cascadia Mobility, offers 300 city-owned bicycles available to the public for a small fee. Bike trails take commuting and recreational bikers along the Willamette River past a scenic rose garden, along Amazon Creek, through the downtown, and through the University of Oregon campus. Eugene is close to many popular mountain bike trails, and Disciples of Dirt is the local mountain bike club that organizes group rides and promotes trail stewardship.

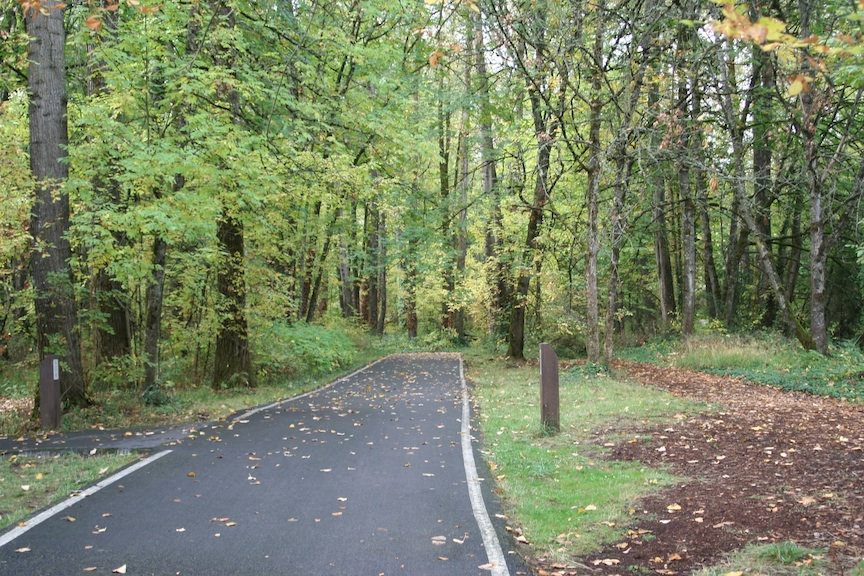
The North Bank Bike Path is a popular trail for cyclists.

In 2009, the League of American Bicyclists cited Eugene as 1 of 10 "Gold-level" cities in the U.S. because of its "remarkable commitments to bicycling." In 2010, Bicycling magazine named Eugene the 5th most bike-friendly city in America. The U.S. Census Bureau's annual American Community Survey reported that Eugene had a bicycle commuting mode share of 7.3% in 2011, the fifth highest percentage nationwide among U.S. cities with 65,000 people or more, and 13 times higher than the national average of 0.56%.

==== Rail ====
The 1908 Amtrak depot downtown was restored in 2004; it is the southern terminus for two daily runs of the Amtrak Cascades, and a stop along the route in each direction for the daily Coast Starlight.

==== Air travel ====
Air travel is served by the Eugene Airport, also known as Mahlon Sweet Field, which is the fifth largest airport in the Pacific Northwest and second largest airport in Oregon. The Eugene Metro area also has numerous private airports. The Eugene Metro area also has several heliports, such as the Sacred Heart Medical Center Heliport and Mahlon Sweet Field Heliport, and many single helipads.

==== Highways ====
Highways traveling within and through Eugene include:

- Interstate 5: Interstate 5 forms much of the eastern city limit, acting as an effective, though unofficial boundary between Eugene and Springfield. To the north, I-5 leads to the Willamette Valley and Portland. To the south, I-5 leads to Roseburg, Medford, and the southwestern portion of the state. In full, Interstate 5 continues north to the Canada–US border at Blaine, Washington and Vancouver, British Columbia and extends south to the Mexico–US border at Tijuana and San Diego.
- Officer Chris Kilcullen Memorial Highway: Oregon Route 126 is routed along the Eugene-Springfield Highway, a limited-access freeway. The Eugene portion of this highway begins at an interchange with Interstate 5 and ends two miles (3.2 km) west at a freeway terminus. This portion of Oregon Route 126 is also signed Interstate 105, a spur route of Interstate 5. Oregon Route 126 continues west, a portion shared with Oregon Route 99, and continues west to Florence. Eastward, Oregon Route 126 crosses the Cascades and leads to central and eastern Oregon.
- Randy Papé Beltline: Beltline is a limited-access freeway which runs along the northern and western edges of incorporated Eugene.
- Delta Highway: The Delta Highway forms a connector of less than 2 miles (3.2 km) between Interstate 105 and Beltline Highway.
- Oregon Route 99: Oregon Route 99 forks off Interstate 5 south of Eugene, and forms a major surface artery in Eugene. It continues north into the Willamette valley, parallel to I-5. It is sometimes called the "scenic route" since it has a great view of the Coast Range and also stretches through many scenic farmlands of the Willamette Valley.

=== Utilities ===
Eugene is the home of Oregon's largest publicly owned water and power utility, the Eugene Water & Electric Board (EWEB). EWEB got its start in the first decade of the 20th century, after an epidemic of typhoid found in the groundwater supply. The City of Eugene condemned Eugene's private water utility and began treating river water (first the Willamette; later the McKenzie) for domestic use. EWEB got into the electric business when power was needed for the water pumps. Excess electricity generated by the EWEB's hydropower plants was used for street lighting.

Natural gas service is provided by NW Natural.

Wastewater treatment services are provided by the Metropolitan Wastewater Management Commission, a partnership between the Cities of Eugene and Springfield and Lane County.

=== Healthcare ===
Two hospitals serve the Eugene-Springfield area. McKenzie-Willamette Medical Center and Sacred Heart Medical Center at RiverBend are in Springfield. Oregon Medical Group, a primary care based multi-specialty group, operates several clinics in Eugene, as does PeaceHealth Medical Group. White Bird Clinic provides a broad range of health and human services, including low-cost clinics. The Volunteers in Medicine & Occupy Medical clinics provide free medical and mental care to low-income adults without health insurance.

Eugene is one of the few municipalities in the US that does not fluoridate its water supply.

== Sister cities ==
Eugene has four sister cities:

- Irkutsk, Russia (suspended in 2022)
- Jinju, South Korea
- Kakegawa, Japan
- Kathmandu, Nepal

== See also ==
- Equal Vote Coalition
