= Southeast, Eugene, Oregon =

Neighborhood of Eugene, Oregon, United States

Coordinates: 44°00′52″N 123°04′18″W

Southeast is the southernmost neighborhood of Eugene, Oregon, United States. As defined by the City of Eugene, this neighborhood:

...encompasses that area bounded by the intersection of Willamette Street and 29th Avenue, east on 29th Avenue to Amazon Parkway, south to East 30th Avenue and the Eugene city limits to the east. From there the boundary follows the city limits to the south. From there the boundary follows the city limits west to the western city limits and thence north until the city limits meet 40th Avenue. From that point the boundary follows 40th Avenue east to an unnamed street, north upon that street to 39th Avenue, east along 39th Avenue to Willamette Street and north on Willamette to 29th Avenue.

== Geography ==
This diverse area includes schools, businesses, low income housing, old and new developments, and affluent homes. It also includes substantial natural resources, including most of the remaining upland wildlife habitat in the City of Eugene. The area has a textured terrain complemented by gentle hillside neighborhoods, views of Spencer Butte, and picturesque, woodsy settings. First growth, old growth, and established second growth forest, steep slopes, vital headwaters and upland wetlands, resident threatened plants and animals, historical landslides and one or more documented faults add to the special character of the local landscape.

Recognizing several unique aspects of the neighborhood, the City of Eugene has established special policies and goals for planning and development, through the South Hills Study (1974, adopted as a refinement plan to the regional Metro Plan) and other documents.

== Southeast Neighbors ==
Southeast Neighbors is the official local neighborhood association representing the Southeast Neighborhood in Eugene, Oregon. Southeast Neighbors is formally recognized by the City of Eugene and the Neighborhood Leaders Council (NLC). Historically active and politically involved, the Southeast Eugene neighborhood includes more than 13,000 residents in some 6,000 households, or roughly 8% of the city of Eugene.

Southeast Neighbors works together with neighbors, community organizations, schools, local government, care centers, and local businesses to improve the neighborhood. The Board of Directors consists of the President and Vice President and eight (8) additional directors. Directors are elected at the Annual Meeting in May. The neighborhood board has included a wide range of community leaders and volunteers. Kevin Matthews served as board president from 2000 to 2013. Heather Sielicki was elected in May 2013.

The neighborhood has been represented on the Eugene City Council by Ward 2 City Councilor Betty Taylor since 1996.

=== Organizational Goals ===
Current organizational goals include the communication of neighborhood issues and activities through printed and electronic communication, face-to-face public meetings and forums, and social events, facilitating open lines of communication with neighbors, city government and our elected representatives, and improving quality of life by developing a sense of neighborhood pride and advocacy.

== See also ==
- Spencer Butte
