= Alton Baker Park =

Park in Oregon, United States

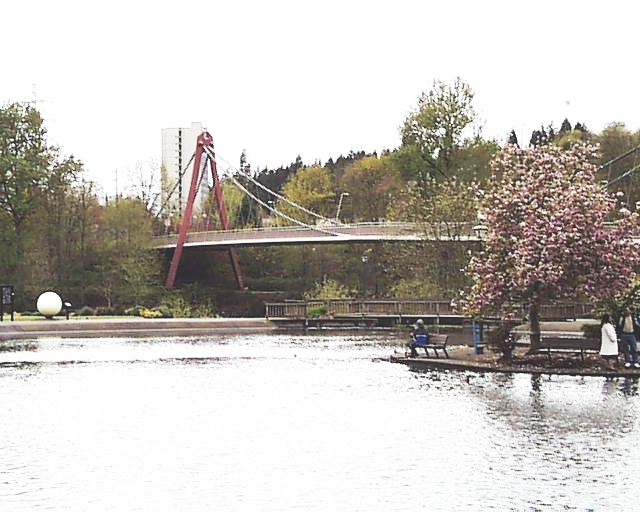
- View across the duck pond with scale model Sun to the left, Willamette River, Peter DeFazio Bridge, Ya-Po-Ah Terrace and Skinner Butte in background
- Interactive map of Alton Baker Park
- Location: Eugene, Oregon, Oregon
- Coordinates: 44°03′22″N 123°04′41″W
- Status: Open all year

Alton Baker Park is located in Eugene, Oregon, United States, near Autzen Stadium. In June 1967, it was dedicated to Alton F. Baker Sr., the eleventh owner (60 years after it was founded) of Eugene's The Guard newspaper (later The Register-Guard). It features duck ponds, bicycle trails, a dog park and a disc golf course, and directly touches the Ferry Street Bridge across the Willamette River.

Other amenities include the Cuthbert Amphitheater, a venue for outdoor musical and drama performances. The amphitheater is named for Fred Cuthbert, the park's designer.

== Whilamut Natural Area ==
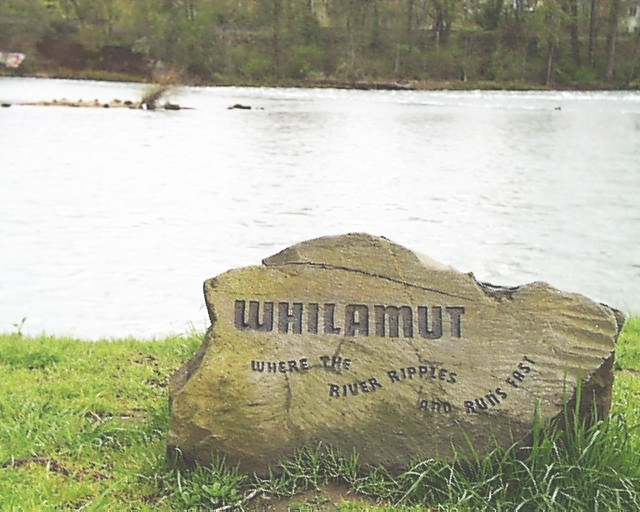
One of the boulders engraved with Kalapuyan words along the paths of east Alton Baker Park, this one is next to the Willamette River: "Whilamut" "Where the river ripples and runs fast"

The less developed, eastern part of Alton Baker Park is known as the Wilhamut Natural Area and links to Springfield's Eastgate Woodlands via bicycle paths and open space. "Wilhamut" is a Kalapuya word that means "where the river ripples and runs fast". A ceremony to rename the former East Alton Baker Park took place on September 7, 2002 and included a traditional Kalapuya naming ceremony.

== Nobel Peace Park ==
In April, 2013, the Nobel Peace Laureate Project opened a one-acre parcel inside Alton Baker Park to celebrate the United States recipients of the Nobel Peace Prize. The park within a park is the first Nobel Peace Park in the United States.

The prize recipients honored in the park are

1. Theodore Roosevelt, 1905
2. Elihu Root, 1912
3. Woodrow Wilson, 1919
4. Charles G. Dawes, 1925
5. Frank B. Kellogg, 1929
6. Jane Addams, 1931
7. Nicholas Murray Butler, 1931
8. Cordell Hull, 1945
9. Emily Greene Balch, 1946
10. John Raleigh Mott, 1946
11. American Friends Service Committee, 1947
12. Ralph Bunche, 1950
13. George Catlett Marshall, 1953
14. Linus Carl Pauling, 1962
15. Martin Luther King Jr., 1964
16. Norman E. Borlaug, 1970
17. Henry Kissinger, 1973
18. International Physicians for the Prevention of Nuclear War, 1985
19. Elie Wiesel, 1986
20. Jody Williams, 1997
21. International Campaign to Ban Landmines, 1997
22. Jimmy Carter, 2002
23. Al Gore, 2007
24. Barack Obama, 2009

== See also ==
- Gillespie Butte
- Hendricks Park
- Park Blocks (Eugene, Oregon)
- Pre's Trail
- Skinner Butte
- Spencer Butte
- Washington Jefferson Park
