= Eugene Mall =

- Location: Eugene, Oregon, United States
- Coordinates: 44.048817°N 123.092753°W
- Opened: February 13, 1971
- Closed: September 18, 2001
- Manager: Public space: Eugene Public Works; Eugene Downtown Association; Eugene Downtown Commission; Privately owned retail and office space
- Owner: Public space: Eugene, Oregon
- Architect: Mitchell, McArthur, Garner, O'Kane Associates
- Parking: Initially metered, then 2200 free spaces

The Eugene Mall was a car-free zone in the heart of Eugene, Oregon, United States, designed to encourage pedestrian access to shopping and entertainment areas. Dedicated on February 13, 1971, the mall opened amid three days of fanfare and dreams of a revitalized downtown. Conflict over the scope and use of the mall began immediately and continued for 30 years until the last remaining parts of the mall were opened to automobile traffic. At that time, former Eugene mayor Ruth Bascom commented that the city's dreams for a bright future just hadn't worked. Many residents, however, shared the much-earlier view of a former downtown merchant, that Eugene had sustained more damage from the mall than it would have from a natural disaster.

== History ==
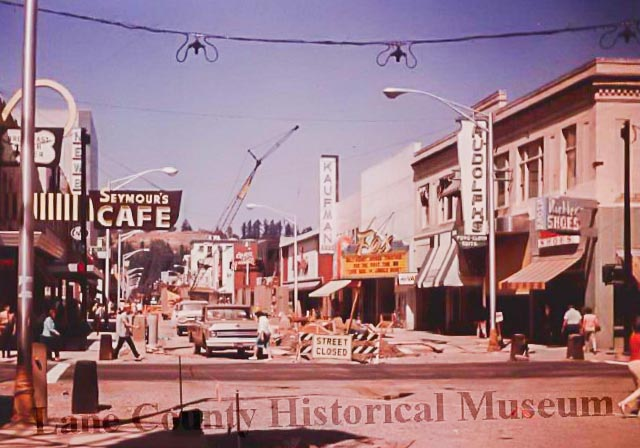
Eugene Mall construction in 1970. The view is from 10th Avenue looking north down Willamette Street. Image courtesy of the Lane County Historical Museum

The Post–World War II economic expansion created a gradual exodus from city core areas in the United States, and federally funded urban renewal projects empowered communities to demolish historic downtown areas and build new, modern structures. With dramatic increases in automobile purchases accompanied by a post-WWII decline in public transportation, many communities accepted urban renewal financing to demolish buildings and install much-needed parking areas.

As climate-controlled, suburban shopping centers became common in the 1960s, communities began to explore ways of drawing retail and entertainment business back into downtown areas. An experimental method of encouraging business was a downtown mall. One researcher found that approximately 200 pedestrian malls were constructed in the United States by the close of the 20th century, although only 15 remained in 2013.

=== An Early prediction of the Eugene Mall ===
In 1963, a Lane County planning director predicted that by 1980, residents of Eugene would live in an age of push-button automation where hands-free cars would speed them into the city core, and they could park in multi-story structures and be whisked on moving sidewalks to an extensive, plastic-covered shoppers' mall.

But the idea of the Eugene Mall had been considered by civic leaders prior to the 1960s. In 1945, for example, Fred Cuthbert proposed closing Willamette Street to cars in order to create a landscaped pedestrian oasis in the center of town, and he suggested parking along the perimeter. As part of the Eugene Centennial Celebration in 1959, a section of Broadway from Oak Street to Charnelton Street was closed to motor traffic, and pedestrians were delighted.

By 1968 the city council was discussing a federally funded urban renewal project to build the Eugene Mall.

=== University of Oregon east campus ===
Community leaders in 1961 had responded to demands for more student housing at the University of Oregon with a project known as the East Campus Urban Renewal. The project demolished historic homes east of the university and constructed large residence complexes surrounded by a landscaped campus that opened in 1965. Some reasoned that if a mall environment could work on a college campus, it would surely work in the downtown business district.

=== Valley River Center ===
Discussions about the need for a downtown mall intensified when Valley River Center (VRC) opened in 1969. The new shopping center was a modern, climate controlled environment with anchor stores and upscale retail and food outlets. And the VRC offered 4000 free parking spaces.

Eugene inventoried its downtown holdings and found four major department stores, 170 to 200 retail outlets, and an estimated 500 firms including banks and professional offices. Most of the 3000 public parking spaces were metered.

=== Groundbreaking for the Eugene Mall ===
Civic leaders determined that the time for a downtown mall had arrived, and construction began May 2, 1970, almost exactly nine months after the opening of Valley River Center.

== Geography and amenities ==
The mall's north–south axis extended on Willamette Street from roughly Eighth Avenue to Eleventh Avenue, with automobile traffic crossing the mall at Tenth Avenue. City bus traffic parked along Tenth Avenue, creating a downtown transfer station. Broadway, a street named in lieu of Ninth Avenue, formed the mall's east–west axis from Charnelton Street to Oak Street.

The mall included five restrooms, two playground areas, and three water features. Largest of the water features was a cement fountain and water pools at the intersection of Willamette and Broadway. Seating areas were stationed at various locations on the mall.

Later, approximately three more blocks were included in the mall, expanding along Olive Street from Eighth Avenue to Tenth Avenue. Covered walkways were placed in alleys within the mall area.

== Economic and social climate ==
The Eugene Mall opened at a time of economic uncertainty and limited consumer confidence. Inflation briefly had risen above six percent. Wage and price controls would be in effect on August 15, 1971. But most troublesome to urban retail centers, corporate retailers were no longer investing in large, stand-alone department stores. Increasingly, corporate emphasis was on vacating downtown areas and moving to suburban shopping centers. Tax incentives allowing accelerated depreciation favored construction of enclosed, suburban malls over freestanding retail outlets.

Social activism had existed in Eugene prior to the mall's opening, and it had both a loyal following and an infrastructure. When Eugene acquired a large, landscaped, outdoor public-use venue with convenient public transportation, it seemed in fulfillment of deeply held social needs that were not dependent upon retail sales. People angry about the Vietnam War gathered on the mall. The mall was an ongoing location for counter-cultural activity. Retail customers experienced unhappiness at the widening generation gap. When Springfield Creamery owner Chuck Kesey, brother of author Ken Kesey, brought the Grateful Dead to the Oregon Renaissance Faire to play a benefit concert for the creamery in 1972, the Eugene Mall seemed like a good waiting room for the next concert. That concert did not occur until 1982.

== Immediate difficulties ==
At the June 16, 1971, Eugene City Council meeting, the council adopted an ordinance enforcing seven pages of rules prohibiting some behaviors at the mall. The mall had been open only four months, but in that time it had become a place for young people to "hang out." They lounged on the lawns, climbed on the main plaza fountain, and waded in fountain pools. The council tabled an ordinance requiring parental consent before purchase of toxic glue, although community leaders expressed concern about the dangers of glue sniffing. The presence of a transient, non-customer population on the mall would be a frequent challenge for merchants.

Some older merchants operating downtown were displaced by the mall. In referring to what he called "the problem of older people," the chairman of the Eugene Renewal Agency expressed sadness that the elderly would like to have "hung on" but couldn't.

Almost from the beginning, city leaders had tried to regulate public use of the mall with permits and fees required for organized activities. At times, the regulations escalated tensions between city government and citizens trying to enjoy the mall, although the city was not able to devise an effective method of resolving tensions.

The mall burdened existing city infrastructure, and in 1972 the city began a street-widening project around the mall's perimeter. The extra traffic lanes were necessary to absorb cars which had been diverted from streets within the mall area. Street lighting was inadequate, and in that year the city installed 19 bright lights 60-feet high in order to double the first-year light levels.

== Parking ==
Parking fees had been listed as a major deterrent to downtown shopping on the Eugene Mall. In 1973 the city created a free parking zone around the mall that included 2200 spaces with no time limits. Effects on retail sales from the free parking zone may have been marginal, and the plan further limited city revenue. Bates found that concerns over parking at pedestrian malls are much more important in the United States than in Europe.

== Shift away from retail ==
Economic conditions in the 1970s had not favored downtown retailers, but urban renewal efforts and tax incentives had benefited the builders of professional and government offices on streets adjacent to the mall. Oak Street, for example, had become the new Main Street. One developer envisioned Eugene as the headquarters of financial institutions, and his view of retail was, "good riddance."

== End of the Eugene Mall ==
In 1984, the city council voted to demolish a portion of the mall on Willamette Street from Tenth Avenue to Eleventh Avenue and return the street to automobile traffic for the first time in 15 years. Business owners celebrated and hailed a new beginning for downtown Eugene.

As early as 1983, civic leaders had discussed confining the mall to a three-block, climate controlled area, but in 1985 plans for the indoor downtown mall were rejected.

Voters reopened Olive Street to motorized traffic in 1992, and in 1995 Willamette Street was reopened.

By 2001, a three-block section of Broadway was all that remained of the Eugene Mall, and voters were asked to remove it. In a special election September 18, 2001, Eugene residents approved by 67 percent a plan to reopen the final section of the mall to motor traffic.

Since its beginning, the mall had been blamed for the flight of business from downtown. The mall had not been able to attract housing for urban professionals and had not offered a sustainable nightlife, yet it had always been home to transients and panhandlers. Community leaders could not develop the mall. Potential customers did not enjoy the mall and rarely had reason to go there. But the explanations about the failure of the Eugene Mall were not sufficient to address why some businesses and government offices could not survive downtown.

After the mall's removal, exodus from downtown continued. In 2006, the federal courthouse fled downtown and opened in a new building only blocks away. In 2012, the downtown urgent care clinic and medical office building closed and was demolished. Student housing opened on that site in 2013. Also in 2012, the Eugene Police Department moved out of downtown when City Hall was abandoned.

== See also ==
- Portland Transit Mall
