= Ya Po Ah Terrace =

Apartment building in Eugene, Oregon

Ya-Po-Ah Terrace
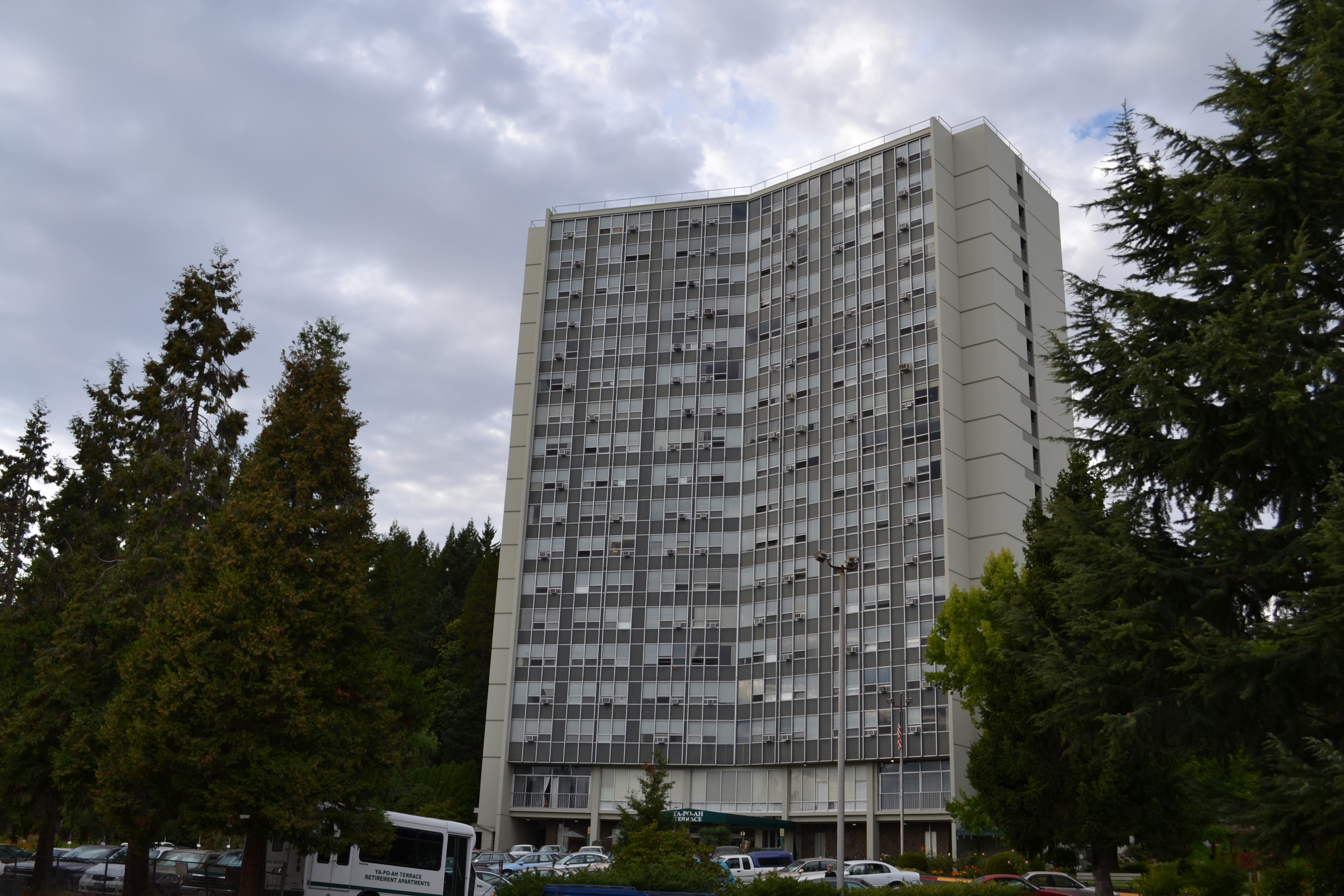
- Interactive map of the Ya-Po-Ah Terrace area

General information
- Type: Apartments
- Location: 350 Pearl Street, Eugene, Oregon, United States
- Coordinates: 44°03′22″N 123°05′26″W
- Completed: 1968
- Opening: 1968

Height
- Roof: 212 feet (65 m)

Technical details
- Floor count: 18

Ya-Po-Ah Terrace (nickname The High Place), is the tallest building in Eugene, Oregon at 212 feet (65 m) and the tallest building in Oregon outside of Portland. It is a controversial high-rise apartment building for senior citizens erected in 1968 at the foot of Skinner Butte.

== History ==
"Ya Po Ah" means very high place in the language of the Kalapuya Indians who inhabited the Willamette Valley prior to the arrival of the Euro-American settlers. Ya Po Ah was the name used by the tribe for what is now called Skinner Butte, in honor of Eugene Franklin Skinner, the founder of Eugene City. He built his first log cabin on the western slopes of the butte to avoid the frequent floods of the Willamette River to the north, per the advice of the Kalapuya.

The building is an 18-story, 222-unit apartment building located on the southern slopes of Skinner Butte, overlooking downtown Eugene. Ya Po Ah also houses a performance hall, library, salon, and convenience stores. Constructed in 1968, public outcry over the building's size led to laws being passed soon after, limiting the height and stories of buildings in Eugene. This was a measure taken to preserve, among other things, the views of nearby mountains. It remains the tallest building in Eugene.

Up until the end of the 1990s these building restrictions limited density and upward growth as the city's population grew, forcing urban sprawl outward, which was then limited by the current Urban growth boundary. Only within the last decade has Eugene begun to amend some of these measures to promote denser growth within the city's core.

A major renovation project that included a redesign of the facade was performed in the summer of 2019.
