= Statue of Eugene Skinner =

Bronze sculpture in Eugene, Oregon,

Eugene Skinner
- The sculpture in 2015
- Artist: Jim Carpenter
- Type: Sculpture
- Medium: Bronze
- Subject: Eugene Skinner
- Location: Eugene, Oregon, United States; 44.04871°N 123.09460°W

Eugene Skinner is an outdoor bronze sculpture of the founder of the city named after him, installed outside the Eugene Public Library in Eugene, Oregon, in the United States. The life-sized statue was created by local artist Jim Carpenter, who estimated Skinner's height to be around five feet, four inches, based on the distance between the butt and trigger of the rifle which appeared in photographs of the pioneer. Skinner is depicted sitting with a hat in his hand; the sculpture rests on a basalt block, quarried from Skinner Butte. Carpenter has said of the statue:

I kind of thought that the big, standing, fist-in-the-air hero kind of thing was maybe a little too much. This is more modest. He is sitting there holding his hat and looking off in the direction of Skinner Butte. There is some public art that is not accessible or not very friendly. It seems to get ignored or walked past or spray-painted. I thought this would be a nice scale for kids. They could sit down next to him.

== Reception ==
The Register-Guard's Bob Keefer said, "With its informal sitting pose, that statue has a certain anti-heroic quality."

== See also ==
- 2002 in art
