= Eugene Marathon =

Marathon in Eugene, Oregon

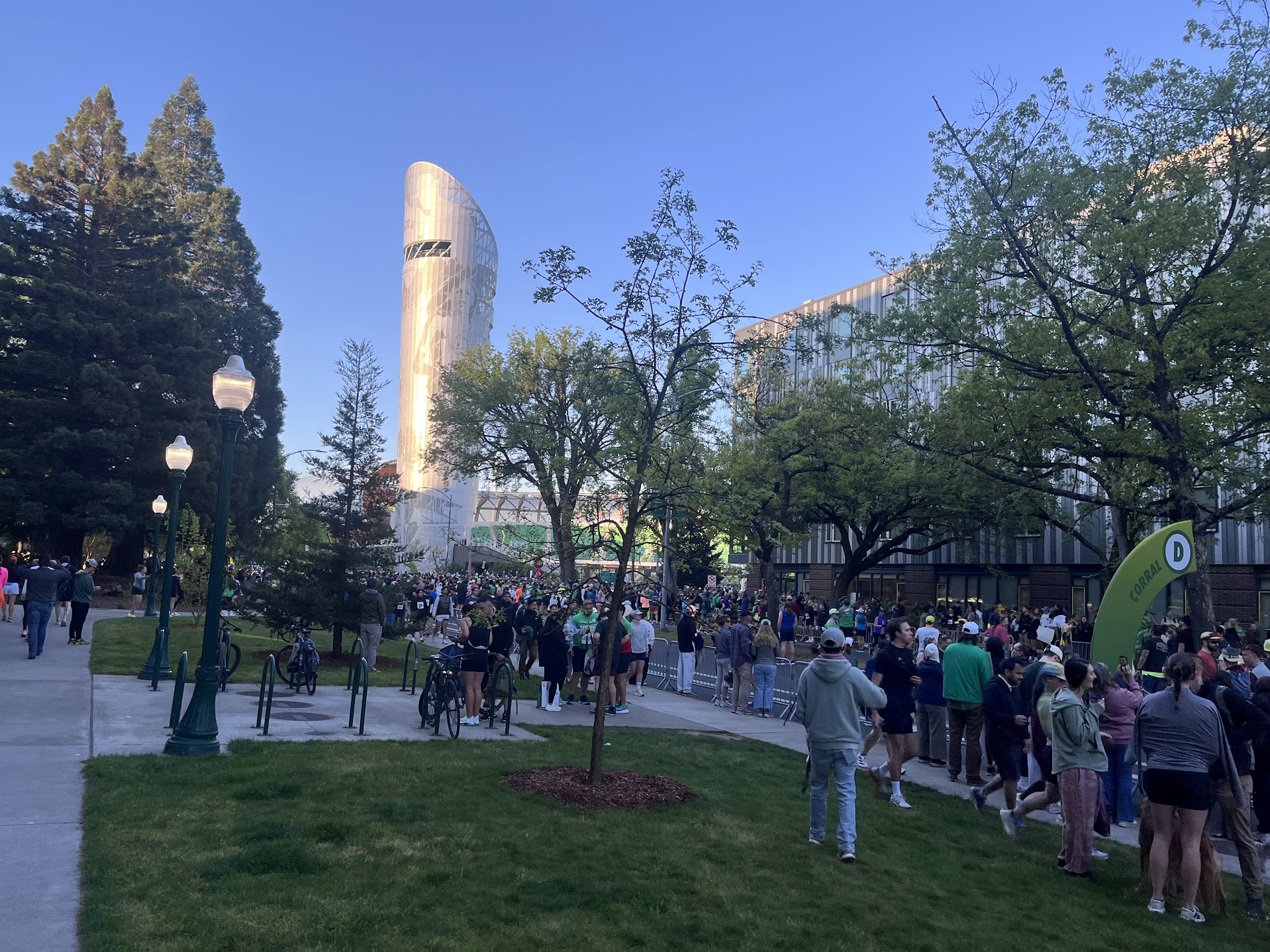
Starting line at the 2026 marathon

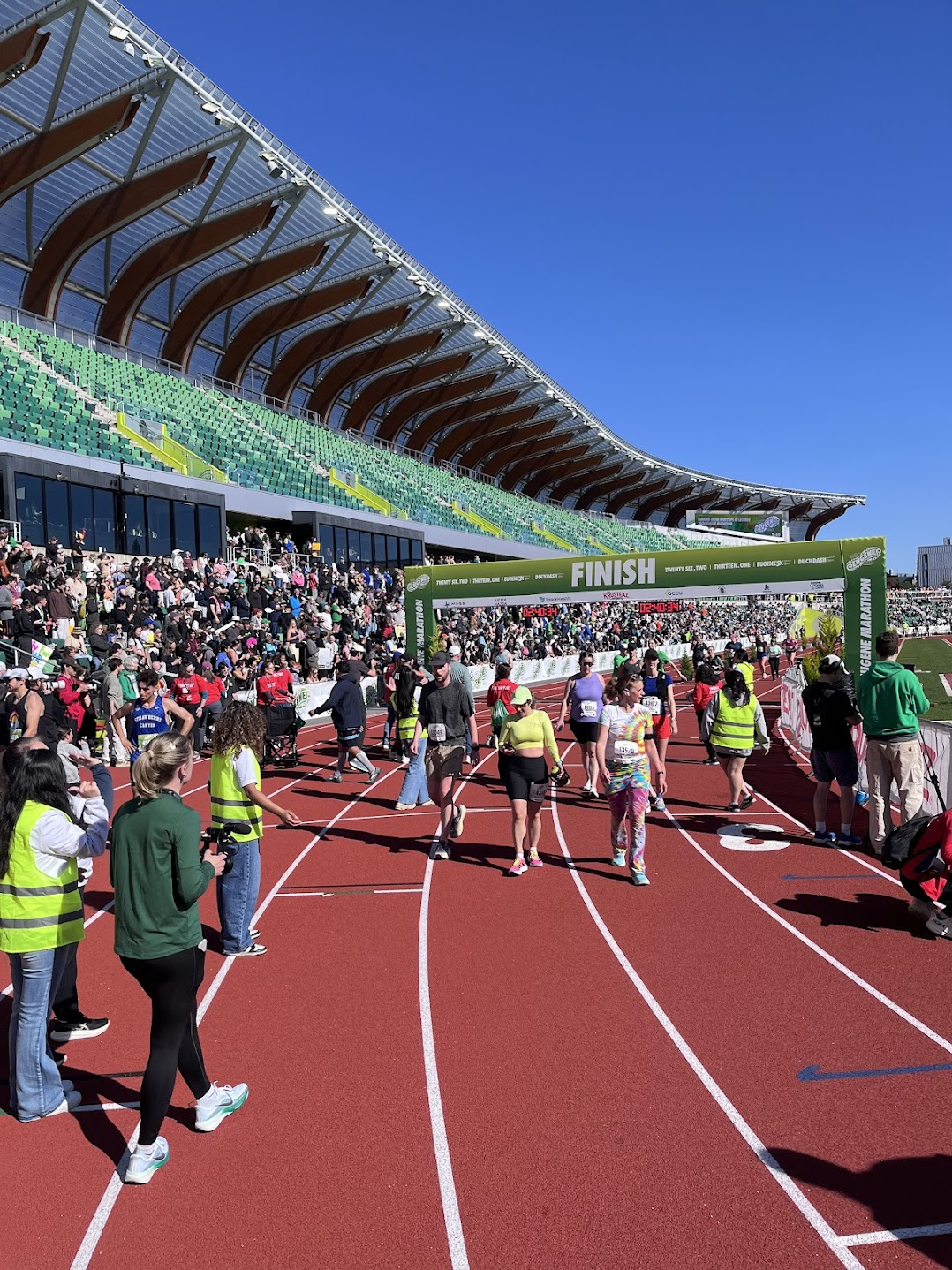
Finish line at the 2026 marathon

The Eugene Marathon, is a marathon established in 2007, which takes place in Eugene, Oregon. The main event is accompanied by a half marathon, 5K and kids run. The marathon is certified by the USATF, and is a qualifying event for both the Boston Marathon and the United States Olympic Trials. The event features live music performed along the marathon and half-marathon routes, and at the finish as well.

The tagline for the event is "Running in the Footsteps of Legends" in honor of the Eugene area's history in the sport, as well as the University of Oregon's tradition of producing great runners.

== History ==
The marathon, established in 2007, was the first major marathon to be held in Eugene since 1984, when the last Nike OTC Marathon was staged. Nearly 5000 entrants participated in the inaugural 2007 marathon events, which featured about thirty elite athletes, many of whom were shooting for qualifying marks for the US Olympic Trials, which were held in New York City in November.

The Eugene area regularly hosts track and field championship events, which in the past have included several National Collegiate Athletic Association track championships and US Olympic Marathon Trials in 1972, 1976 and 1980. In 2021, Eugene will be the first city in the United States to host the International Association of Athletics Federation's 2021 World Championships in Athletics, which is billed as the world's largest sporting event in 2021.

The 2020 edition of the race was cancelled due to the coronavirus pandemic, with registrants having the option of transferring their registration to 2021 or 2022 for free. The 2021 race was held virtually due to the pandemic.

== Course ==
The Eugene Marathon has been certified by USA Track and Field, the sport's governing body in the United States, at 26.2-mile (42.2 km).

The course is laid out primarily on city streets and bike paths along the Willamette River, following many of the roads and trails used by Oregon's significant runners, such as Steve Prefontaine, Alberto Salazar, Bill McChesney and Mary Decker Slaney.

The Eugene Marathon begins in front of Hayward Field on the University of Oregon campus. Hayward Field was under construction in preparation for the IAAF's 2021 World Championships in Athletics, so the Eugene Marathon began instead at Autzen Stadium between 2019 and 2021. Runners cross the Willamette River and go through downtown and the campus area, then down past South Eugene High School and through Amazon Park. They continue into the edge of the South Hills, then turn back north and eventually get on the riverfront trail system. From here they make a loop that travels through the River Road neighborhood and then across the Owosso Drive footbridge to the Delta Ponds area, Alton Baker Park, and eventually east to Springfield before circling back to finish at Autzen Stadium.

The marathon is a Boston Marathon and US Olympic Marathon Trials qualifier event, and its certification allows record breaking performances to qualify as new world records.

== Community impact ==
Proceeds from the event benefit various community causes such as CASA of Lane County, American Cancer Society, the Lane County food bank, Pre's Trail, and others.

== Winners ==
Course record

Ed.	Date	Male	Time	Female	Time	Refs.
19th	2026	Jackson Siddall	2:15:03	Amanda Martin	2:34:24	
18th	2025	Bradley Hodkinson	2:19:43	Anna Kenig-Ziesler	2:36:53	
17th	2024	Matthew Hernandez	2:22:30	Kate Landau	2:40:52	
16th	2023	Clint McKelvey	2:16:34	Sara Lopez	2:33:48	
15th	2022	Tyler Morse	2:20:29	Carrie Dimoff	2:43:51	
14th	2021	Brian Reid	2:24:04	Chelsea Warren	2:48:40	
	2020	cancelled due to the coronavirus pandemic				
13th	2019	Kyle King	2:18:04	Jennifer Bigham	2:41:37	
12th	2018	Teklu Deneke	2:22:12	Kate Landau	2:35:44	
11th	2017	Steve DeKoker	2:29:46	Hiruni Wijayaratne	2:43:31	
10th	2016	Carlos Trujillo	2:18:54	Camelia Mayfield	2:47:45	
9th	2015	Craig Leon	2:21:33	Catherine Watkins	2:42:35	
8th	2014	Jacob Chemtai	2:16:07	Degefa Biruktayit Eshetu	2:33:15	
7th	2013	David Laney	2:22:34	Jaymee Marty	2:48:50	
6th	2012	Michael Wisniewski	2:20:41	Allison Howard	2:53:07	
5th	2011	Justin Ricks	2:22:05	Katie Blackett	2:44:14	
4th	2010	Craig Leon	2:23:15	Midori Sperandeo	2:44:21	
3rd	2009	Matt Hooley	2:18:38	Emily Enstice	2:58:36	
2nd	2008	Matthew Norminton	2:22:04	Erin Kaspar	2:52:52	
1st	2007	James Nielsen	2:21:01	Meredith Lambert	2:44:39	

== Leadership ==
- Founder/Principal: Richard Maher and Andy Heily
- Executive Race Director: Courtney Heily
- Race Director: Ian Dobson
- Director of Event Operations: Becky Radliff
- Marketing and Content Coordinator: Jon Marx
