= O (gesture) =

Gesture used predominantly at the University of Oregon

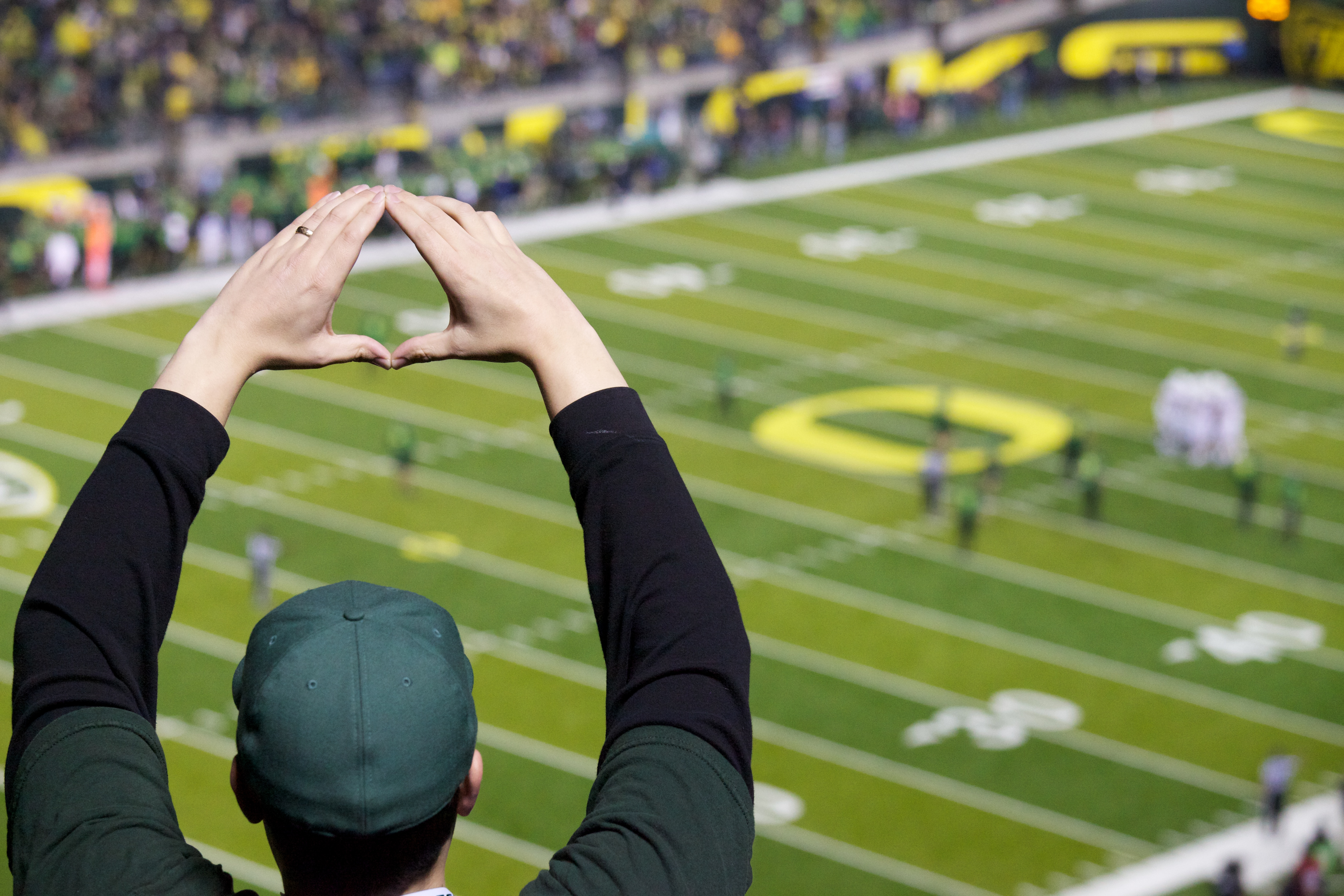
A fan "throwing the O" at an Oregon Ducks football game in 2011

The "O" is a gesture used predominantly at the University of Oregon (UO) in Eugene, Oregon, United States, and especially at events in which the school's athletic teams, the Oregon Ducks, are taking part. The gesture is used to show support for the team or university, and is formed by an individual matching up the fingertips of each hand after making the letter "C" with both hands. First used by University of Oregon band directors as a cue to indicate the song to be played, it gained its current meaning after a photograph of quarterback Joey Harrington appeared on the front page of The Oregonian making the "O" sign with his hands.

== Origin ==
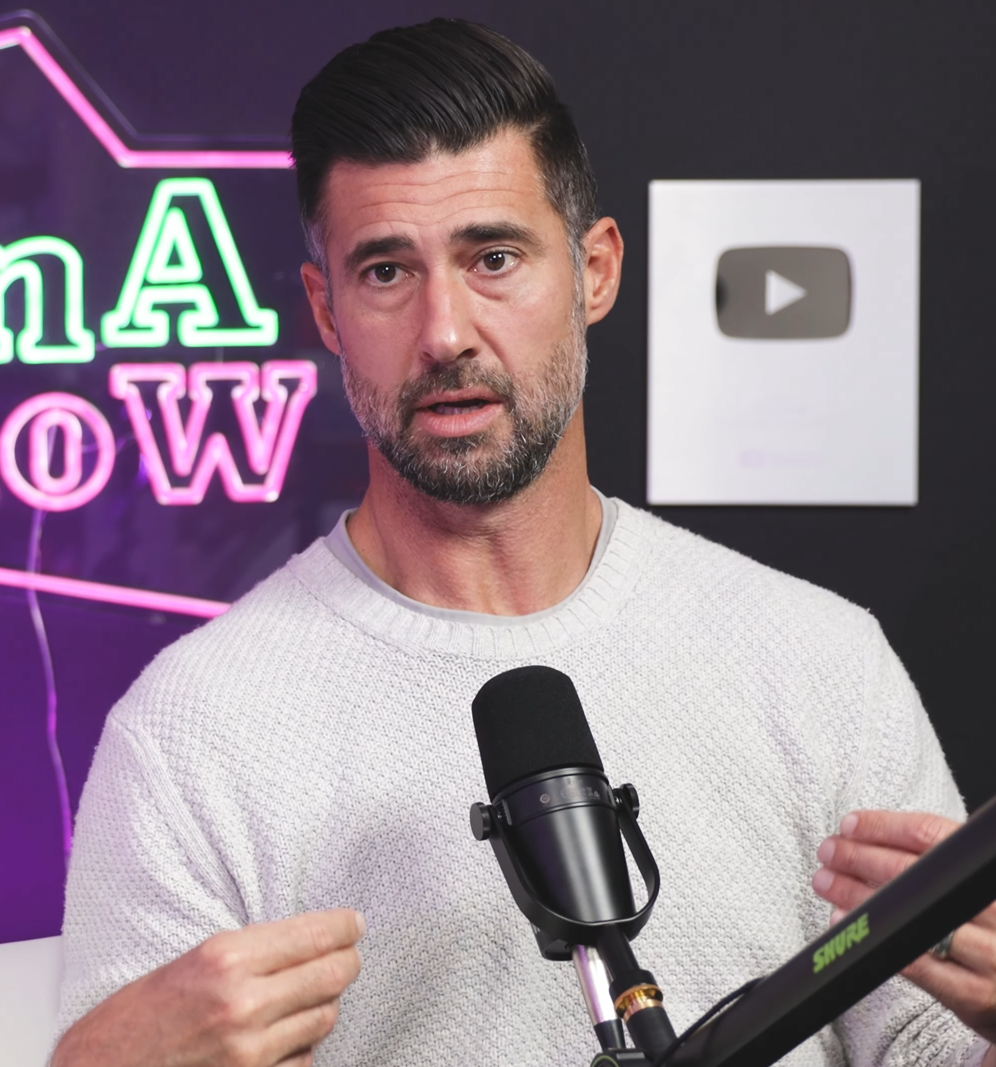
The "O" gesture was popularized by Oregon Ducks football quarterback Joey Harrington, who was photographed displaying it on the front page of The Oregonian in 2001

The gesture was first used by University of Oregon band directors, who relied on visual cues to direct the ensemble due to crowd noise. Steven Paul, who served as band director from 1983 to 1989, used the sign to prompt musicians to begin performing the fight song "Mighty Oregon". It was one of several gestures used by Paul and subsequent band directors, including Todd Zimbelman, who served as the band director from 1999 to 2005. It became popularized after a photograph of quarterback Joey Harrington making the "O" appeared on the front page of The Oregonian one day following the Civil War game in 2001. Harrington had made the gesture at the band, hoping to hear the fight song one more time. In 2014, Harrington recalled:

We're walking back up the tunnel and through my career I'd noticed that the band director made that 'O' symbol with his hands to signal to the band that he wanted them to play the fight song. The crowd is loud, so you can't yell, 'Play the fight song!' so instead, he'd come up with the 'O' symbol and he'd give the symbol and the band would play the song... I'm walking toward the tunnel for the last time and I had one of those nostalgic moments. I wanted to hear the fight song one more time... I made the 'O' signal. I wanted to hear it one more time... Did I invent the 'O'? No. Was I the first player to use it in that fashion? Yes. But it's not for the purposes that everyone does it today.

The moment was photographed by Bruce Ely, photographer at The Oregonian, and Thomas Boyd, who worked for the Eugene Register-Guard at the time. Ely recalled, "I remember calling editors and telling them it would be a cool picture for the front page. It took off from there. I think Tom and I are the only two people that happened to be in position."

Harrington displayed the gesture again at the Fiesta Bowl.

== Adoption ==
Fans continued displaying the "O" at sporting events following the 2001 game. Nike gloves and other merchandise have been produced showing the symbol. According to John Canzano, sports writer for The Oregonian, the gesture has become "a universal non-verbal rally cry for the university".

The Winter 2014 edition of the Oregon Quarterly includes a photograph of Lady Gaga "throwing the O" with a UO alumna.

== Controversy ==
As Oregon players began to use the gesture on the field after a good play, Fox Sports rules analyst Mike Pereira, a former NFL and college football official, indicated that he thought the use of the sign bordered on unsportsmanlike conduct, which could lead to a 15-yard penalty. Pereira later clarified his comments, indicating that the sign should be allowed, as long as it was not "prolonged" or "directed at an opponent."

Teachers in an American Sign Language class at Oregon have cautioned that, since the gesture often ends up being improperly formed, it ends up having more of the spade-like shape of the sign for "vagina" rather than the letter "O". Former Ducks player LaMichael James, who took the class, avoided making the sign for fear of being misinterpreted.

== See also ==
- Big "O", a hillside letter representing the University of Oregon, located at Skinner Butte in Eugene, Oregon
