= Louis Renninger =

- Born: August 25, 1841; Liverpool, Ohio
- Died: November 17, 1908 (aged 67); Oregon
- Burial place: Eugene Pioneer Cemetery
- Military career
- Allegiance: United States of America; Union
- Branch: Union Army
- Rank: Corporal
- Units: Company H, 37th Ohio Volunteer Infantry Regiment
- Conflicts: American Civil War; *Battle of Vicksburg
- Awards: Medal of Honor

Louis Renninger (August 25, 1841 - November 17, 1908) was a Union soldier who received the Medal of Honor for gallantry in the American Civil War.

On May 22, 1863, Renninger was one of 150 Union soldiers who volunteered to lead an assault on the Confederate heights at the Battle of Vicksburg, Mississippi. The plan was for the volunteer storming party to build a bridge across a moat and plant scaling ladders against the enemy embankment in advance of the main attack.

The volunteers knew the odds were against survival and the mission was called a "forlorn hope" in nineteenth century vernacular. Only single men were accepted as volunteers and even then, twice as many men as needed came forward and were turned away. The assault began in the early morning following a naval bombardment and it was a failure.

The Union soldiers came under enemy fire immediately and were pinned down in the ditch they were to cross. Despite repeated attacks by the main Union body under the command of General Grant, the men of the forlorn hope were unable to retreat until nightfall. Of the 150 men in the storming party, two-thirds were killed. Corporal Louis Renninger of Company H, 37th Ohio Volunteer Infantry was one of the survivors and for his gallantry, he was awarded the Medal of Honor in 1894. As a result of his injuries, he was transferred to the Veteran Reserve Corps, and discharged in October 1864.

Heading to Oregon after the war, Renninger and his wife Elizabeth had a family farm in the Mohawk Valley of Lane County, Oregon. He is buried in the Eugene Pioneer Cemetery.

== Medal of Honor citation ==
Rank and organization: Corporal, Company H, 37th Ohio Infantry. Place and date: At Vicksburg, Miss., 22 May 1863. Entered service at: ------. Birth: Liverpool, Ohio. Date of issue: 15 August 1894.

Citation:

Gallantry in the charge of the "volunteer storming party."

== See also ==
- List of Medal of Honor recipients
- List of American Civil War Medal of Honor recipients: Q–S
