= Eugene Pioneer Cemetery =

- U.S. National Register of Historic Places
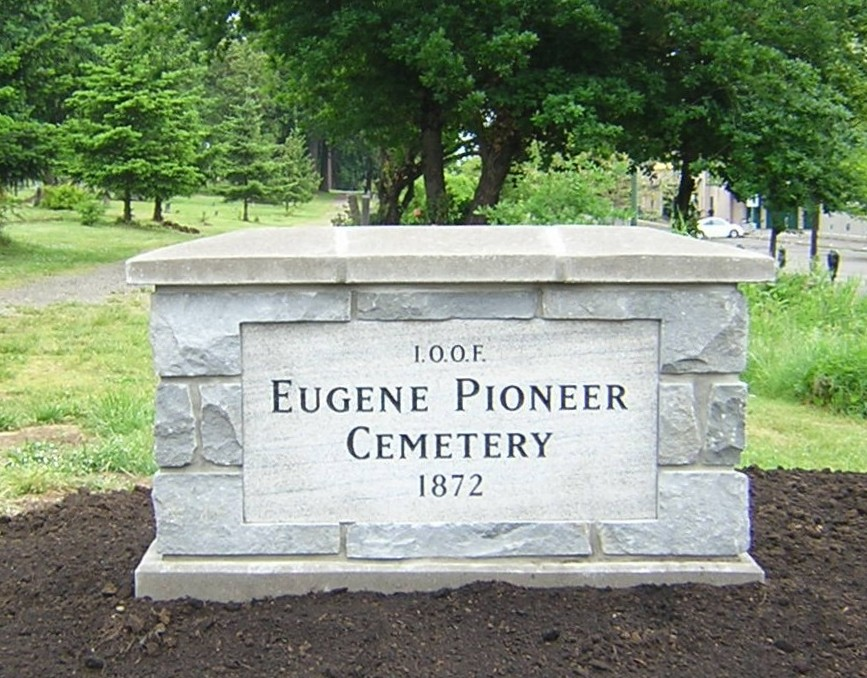
- Eugene Pioneer Cemetery sign
- Location: 18th Ave and University St; Eugene, Oregon
- Coordinates: 44°2′29″N 123°4′34″W
- Built: 1872
- NRHP reference No.: 97000850
- Added to NRHP: August 1, 1997

Eugene Pioneer Cemetery (also Pioneer Memorial Cemetery and Independent Order of Odd Fellows (I.O.O.F.) Cemetery) is a pioneer cemetery in Eugene, Oregon, United States. It is one of the three oldest cemeteries in Eugene. It is the largest in both acreage and burials encompassing 16 acres (65,000 m^{2}) with approximately 5,000 burials.

== History ==
The cemetery was founded in 1872 by the Spencer Butte Lodge No. 9 of the Independent Order of Odd Fellows. The cemetery is located adjacent to the campus of the University of Oregon but is not affiliated with the college. It is situated across University Street from McArthur Court and is behind the Knight Library. In at least three sessions of the Oregon State Legislature, bills were introduced which would have allowed the University of Oregon to condemn the property, remove graves, and build on the land; the last attempt was in January 1963 with the submission of studies presented to the University of Oregon by the Springfield architecture firm of Lutes and Amundson. All of the legislative bills died in committee. The cemetery was added to the National Register of Historic Places in 1997.

Notable burials in the cemetery include Louis Renninger, who was awarded the Medal of Honor in the American Civil War. Renninger is one of one hundred and forty-five Civil War veterans buried in the cemetery. There is also a section for Spanish–American War veterans and there are many veterans from World War I and World War II.

== G.A.R. burial plot ==
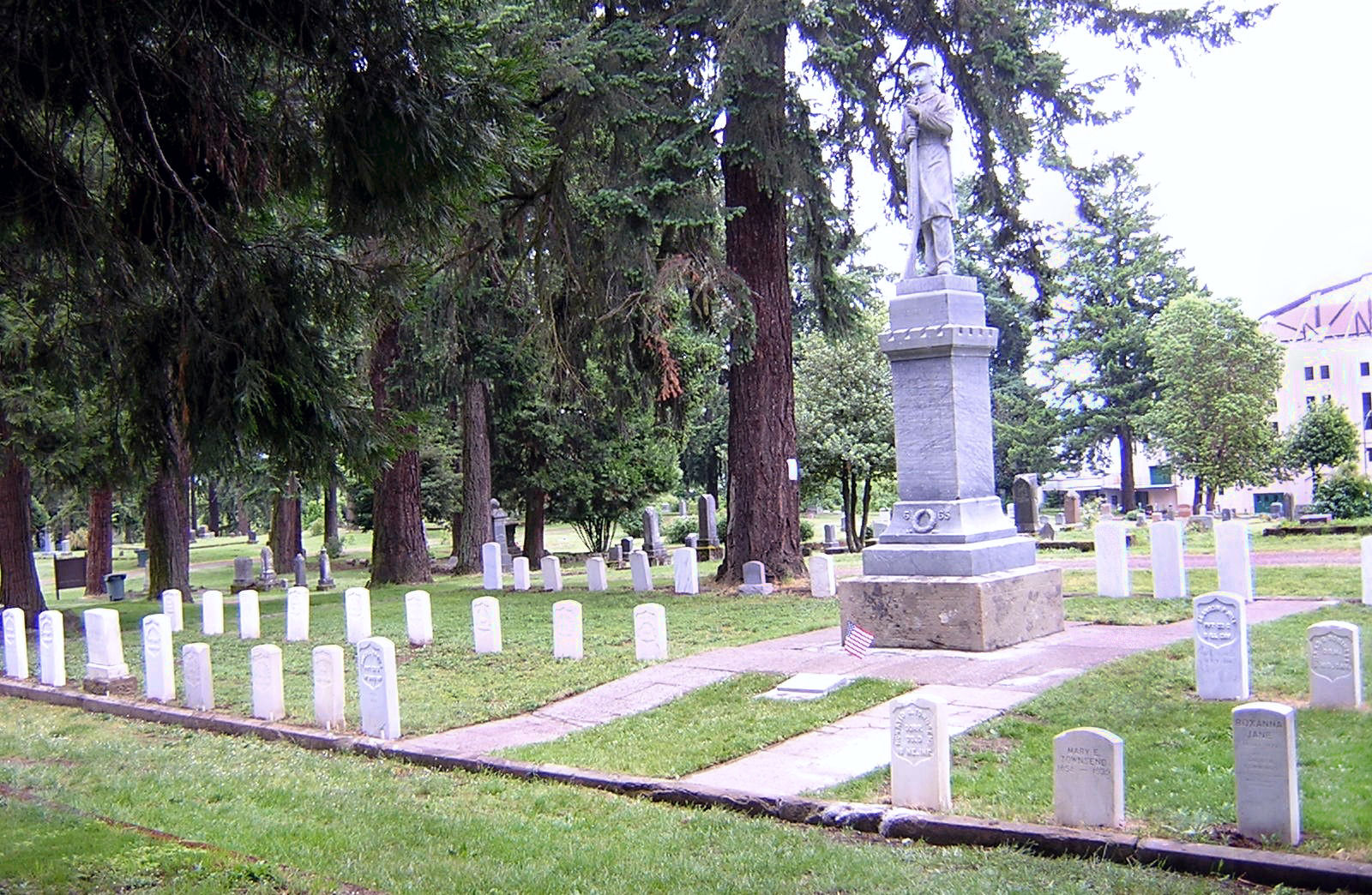
G.A.R. plot at Eugene Pioneer Cemetery

The "signature" of the Eugene Pioneer Cemetery is the Grand Army of the Republic burial plot located near the center of the cemetery. The plot was purchased in 1887 by the Gen. John W. Geary post of the Eugene G.A.R. There are fifty-seven known graves in the plot including fifty-one Civil War veterans and six women and children. In the center of the plot stands a twenty-five-foot statue of a Union soldier. In 1903, Union veteran John Covell's estate, valued at $2,500, specified that a monument be placed at the G.A.R. plot where he was laid to rest. The bequest was challenged in court by Covell's relatives, but a Eugene judge ruled in favor of the G.A.R. The statue was carved in Vermont and shipped by rail to Eugene. The 8-short-ton (7 t) statue was brought to the cemetery by an eight horse team and raised by block and tackle. In December 2001, vandals broke the head of the statue off and pulverized it. Local artist David Miller was commissioned to sculpt a replacement. An 800-pound block of blue marble was obtained from the same Vermont quarry where the original statue was carved one hundred years before. The new head was installed in February 2003 and dedicated that Memorial Day.

In 2007 the G.A.R. plot underwent a major restoration by the Col. Edward D. Baker camp of the Sons of Union Veterans of the Civil War.

== Notable burials ==
- James Henry Dickey Henderson (1810–1885), U.S. Representative from Oregon
- Harrison R. Kincaid (1836–1920), Oregon Secretary of State
- Louis Renninger (1841–1908), Medal of Honor recipient in the Civil War
- David M. Risdon (1821–1905), pioneer lawyer, judge, member of Oregon Territorial Legislature
- Joshua J. Walton (1838–1909), pioneer lawyer, judge, regent of the University of Oregon
