= David M. Risdon =

David Matteson Risdon (June 3, 1821 – 1905) was an American lawyer, judge, and politician of the Oregon Territory of the United States. He platted Eugene City in 1851 with Eugene Skinner. He served in the House of the 3rd Oregon Territorial Legislative Session in 1851.

== Early life ==
Risdon was born on June 3, 1821, in Fairfield, Vermont. In 1845, Risdon traveled to Stark County, Illinois, where he taught school for one season. He then studied law in Peoria under H. O. Merriman. He was admitted to practice law in the courts of Illinois in 1849 and moved to Toulon.

In spring 1850, he traveled west to Weaverville, California to participate in the California gold rush. After achieving success he sailed to Portland, Oregon, arriving in December 1850. He later traveled south to what became Lane County.

== Oregon Territory ==
Risdon came to what is now Eugene in 1851, as the second pioneer in the Eugene area after Skinner. He hired Hilyard Shaw to build his house, which was the first within Eugene's city limits. After serving as the first representative from Lane County in the territorial legislature, he moved to Irving in 1853, returning to Eugene City in 1857. On October 8, 1853, he married Pauline Wright.

== University of Oregon ==
In 1872, he was one of founders of the Union University Association, which worked to establish a public university in Eugene and helped raise funds to build the University of Oregon's first building, Deady Hall (now University Hall).

== Washington Territory ==
Risdon moved to Whitman County, Washington Territory, in 1877 returning to Eugene in 1880.

== Later life ==
Risdon moved to Lewiston, Idaho in 1896. He died in Lewiston in 1905 and is buried in Eugene Pioneer Cemetery, where one of the lanes is named for him.

== See also ==
- List of members of the Oregon Territorial Legislature
