= Big "O" =

- U.S. National Register of Historic Places
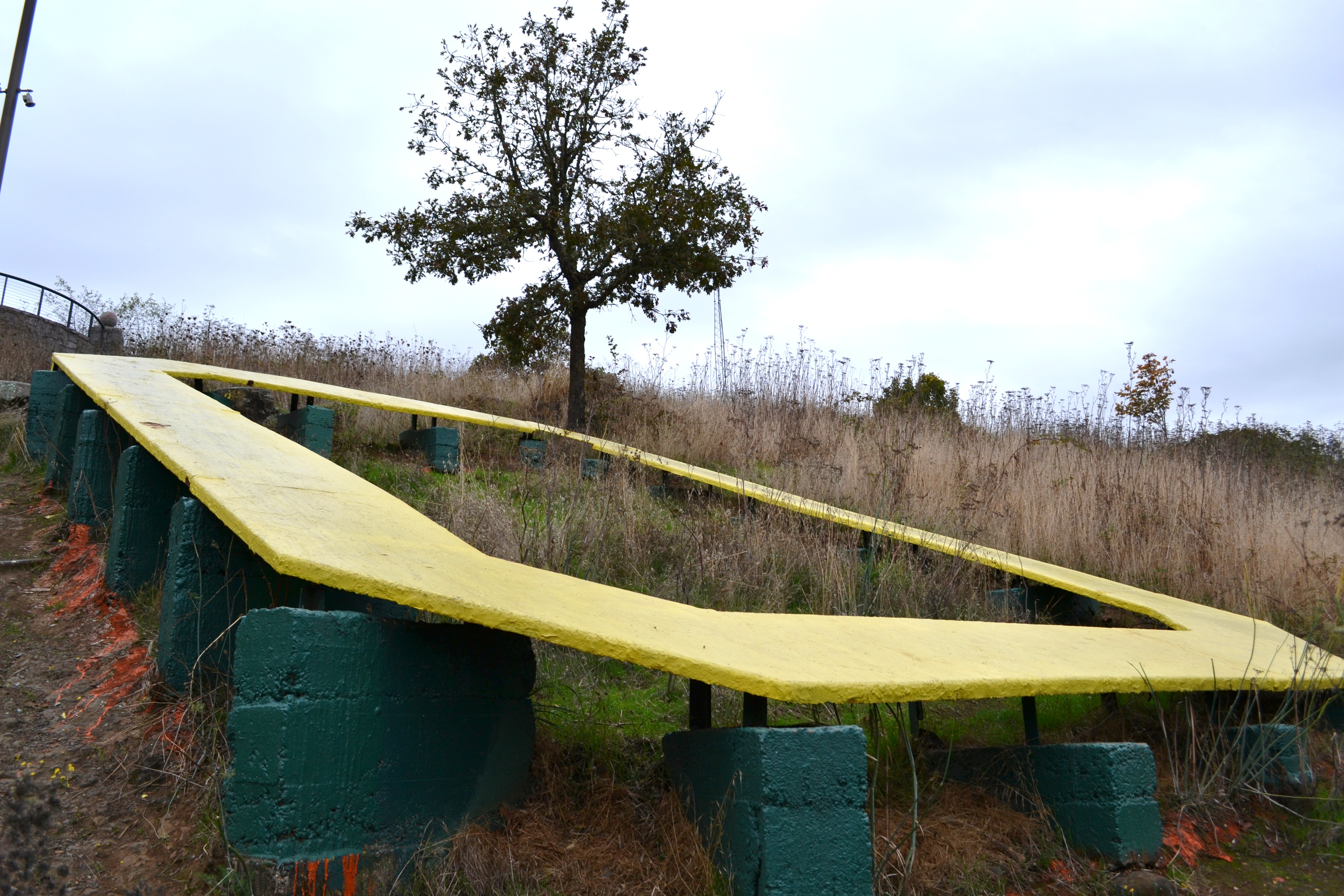
- The Big "O"
- Location: Skinner Butte; Eugene, Oregon
- Coordinates: 44.0577°N 123.0927°W
- Built: 1958
- NRHP reference No.: 10000800
- Added to NRHP: September 23, 2010

The Big "O" is a hillside letter representing the University of Oregon, located at Skinner Butte in Eugene, Oregon. Built in 1958, the sign was added to the National Register of Historic Places on September 23, 2010. Every year, members of the university community hike up the butte to give the sign a fresh coat of paint.

== See also ==
- National Register of Historic Places listings in Lane County, Oregon
- O (gesture)
