= Ferry Street Bridge (Eugene, Oregon) =

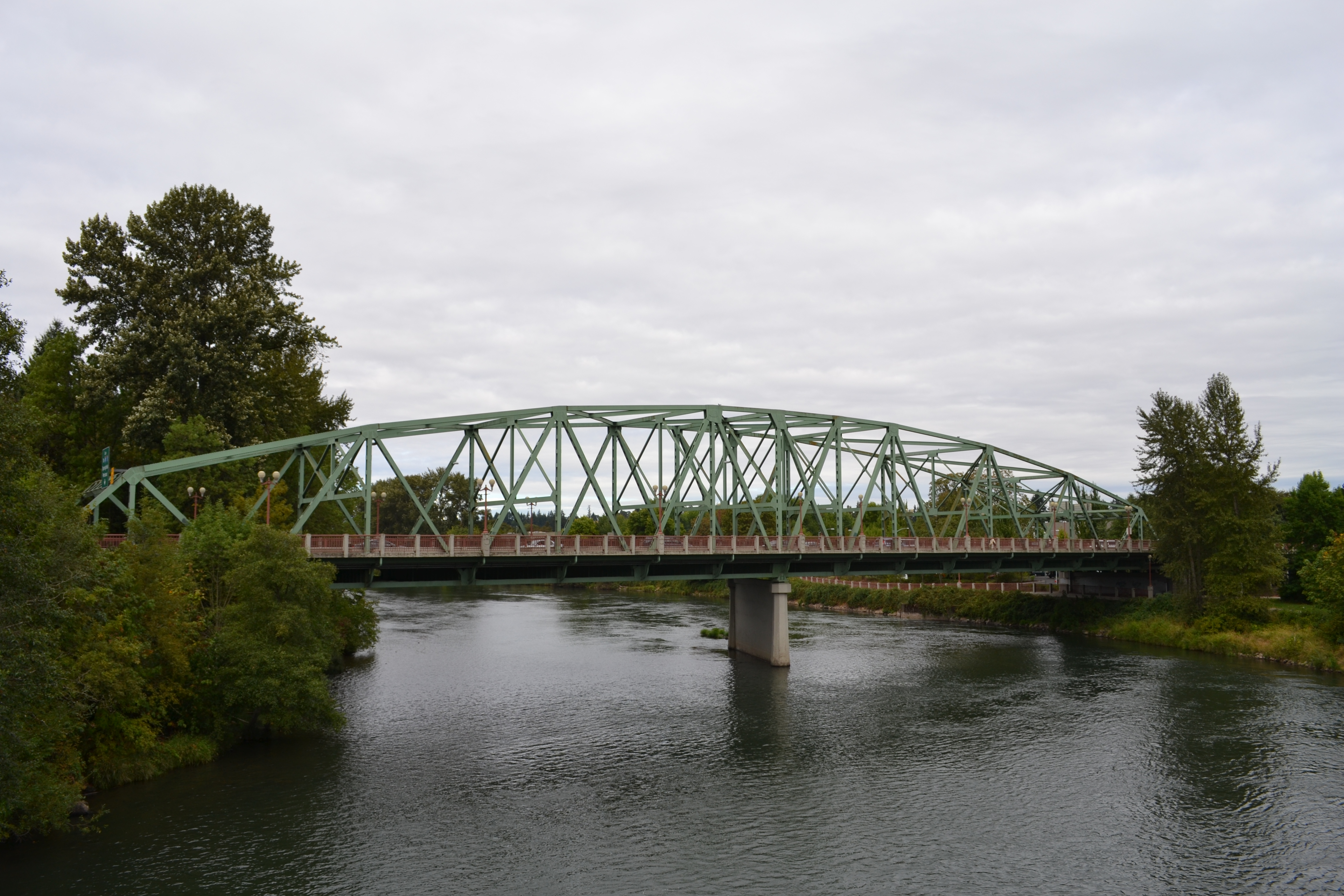
- Coordinates: 44.0579°N 123.0840°W
- Carries: Four lanes of Coburg Road
- Crosses: Willamette River
- Locale: Eugene, Oregon
- Official name: Ferry Street Bridge

Characteristics
- Total length: 800 feet (240 m)

History
- Opened: 1950

The Ferry Street Bridge is a bridge that spans the Willamette River in Eugene, Oregon, United States. It is located near downtown Eugene, where the city's founder Eugene Skinner once operated a ferry service. The bridge is at Willamette river mile 182.2, and is a block west of the north terminus of the actual Ferry Street. The neighborhood immediately north of the Willamette River near the bridge is often called the "Ferry Street Bridge area."

Ferry Street Bridge carries Coburg Road in four lanes which connects the small city of Coburg to central Eugene. The bridge is approximately 800 feet (240 m) long, though the river width is only 300 feet (91 m) here, Club Road passes under the Ferry Street Bridge on the north shore along with a bike path; another bike path passes under the bridge on the south shore where it enters the east end of Campbell Park.

The bridge is on the shortest motor vehicle route between the University of Oregon main campus and Autzen Stadium.

The Peter DeFazio Bridge is located approximately 350 feet (110 m) upstream.
