= Pre's Trail =

Trail near Eugene, Oregon

Coordinates: 44.051°N 123.065°W

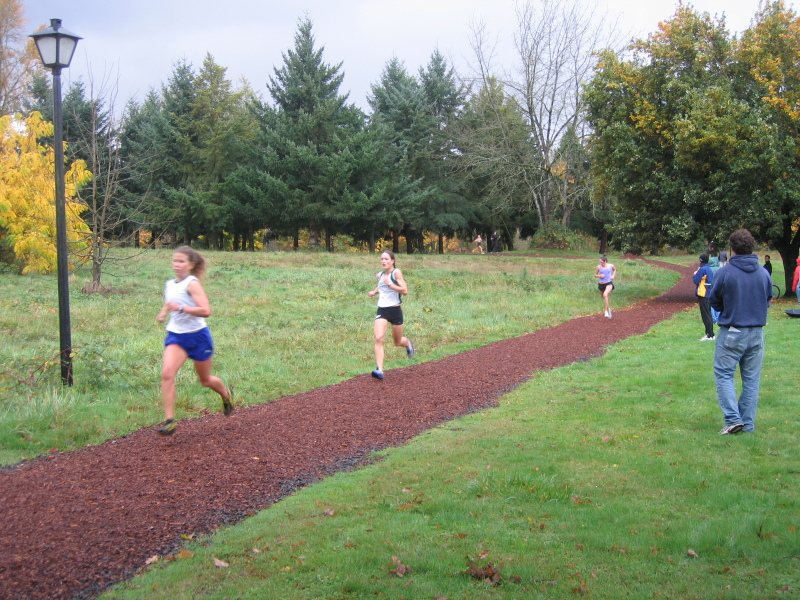
- Pre's Trail during a cross country race in 2005
- Length: 4.07 mi (6.55 km)
- Trailheads: Eugene, Oregon
- Use: Running, walking
- Season: Year round

Pre's Trail, located on the north side of the Willamette River in Eugene, Oregon, United States, popularly referred to as "Track Town USA", is a four-mile-long running and walking trail named after heralded University of Oregon athlete Steve Prefontaine. The woodchip-and-bark trail features riparian scenery, including grasslands, duck ponds, and woods, as well as guide signs with trail maps at each of three primary trailheads. Near downtown Eugene, in Alton Baker Park, Pre's Trail is part of an extensive network of running trails in and around the university town and neighboring Springfield.

== History ==
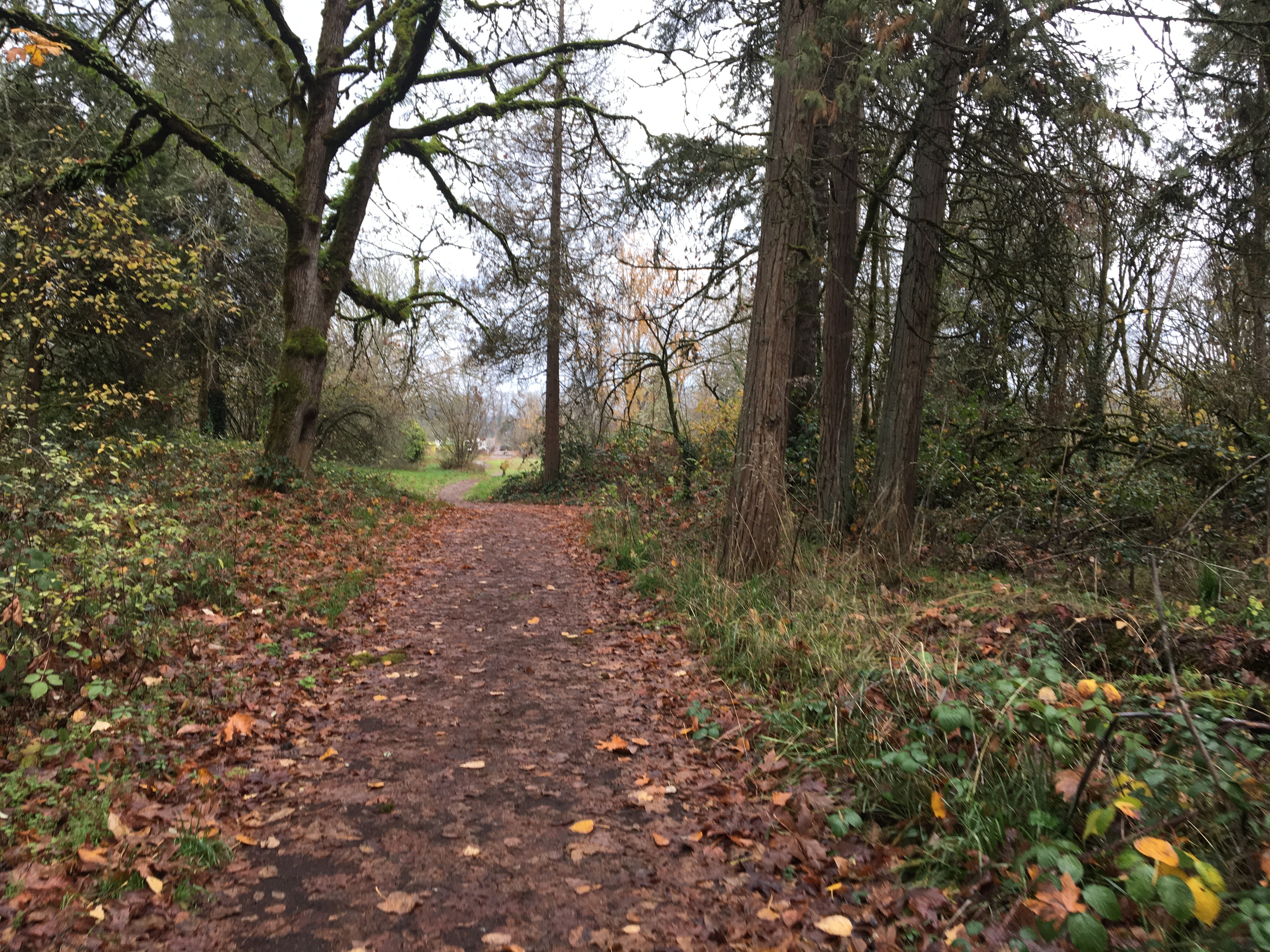
Pre's Trail during the fall

Steve Prefontaine, or "Pre," was impressed with the style and terrain of European cross country running courses while competing overseas. Upon return from Europe, he suggested to local officials about building a running trail through Eugene's Alton Baker Park. Lane County worked with the Oregon Track Club and University of Oregon track coach Bill Bowerman to design and build Pre's Trail. Within four months of Pre's death in an auto accident in 1975, the new trail served as venue to a memorial race of approximately five hundred participants in his honor.

Situated to the north of, and across the Willamette River from, the University of Oregon, Pre's Trail is enjoyed by a variety of recreational users in Eugene's urban core. The venue is often the site of cross country competitions staged by local schools, including Sheldon High (which trains on the trail throughout their Cross Country season), colleges and running clubs. Additionally, a significant portion of the Eugene Marathon is on Pre's Trail.

A significant portion of Pre's Trail is located on the site of the Day Island Landfill Environmental Cleanup Site. Used as a dump from 1963 - 1974, the site is classified by the Oregon Department of Environmental Quality (DEQ) as a "suspect site requiring further investigation." Contamination has been documented by the DEQ in ground and surface water in adjacent waterways although no timeline has been created for clean up.

A chemical disposal area is located southeast of the radio station well. The Oregon DEQ website provides more detailed information about this hazardous site here.

== Route ==
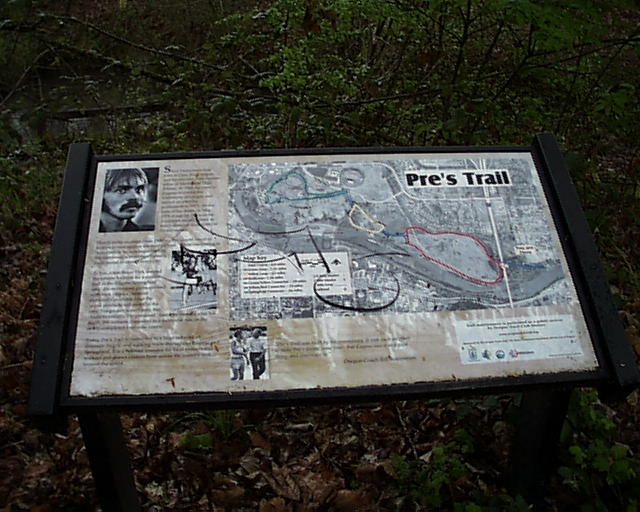
Interpretive sign and map of Pre's Trail in eastern part of Alton Baker Park

Pre's Trail undulates mildly on a typically flat river isle, and features large sections entirely covered by wood chips, with some single track dirt trail, gravel sections, and a short swath of asphalt on the Big Loop.

There are three main loops, with interlinking paths:

- Southeast (Big Loop), 1.66 miles (2.67 km)
- Center (Parcourse Loop), .65 miles
- Northwest (Bottom Loop), 1.06

=== Access ===
Pre's Trail is located off Martin Luther King Jr. Boulevard, near Autzen Stadium.

Pre's trail lies within Alton Baker Park, and is accessible from parking lots at three trailhead entrances at each of the three main loops. There are two footbridges, providing access from the University of Oregon campus, located just across the Willamette River. From campus, the Center Loop can be accessed via the Frohnmayer Footbridge (south of Autzen Stadium, half a block north of Franklin and Agate Streets), and to the southeastern Big Loop via the Knickerbocker Footbridge (near Franklin and Riverview Streets).

== See also ==
- Prefontaine Classic
