= Mighty Oregon =

Fight song for University of Oregon

"Mighty Oregon" is the fight song for the University of Oregon. Written in 1915 and officially known as "The Mighty Oregon March," music was written by Albert John Perfect with words by journalism student DeWitt Gilbert. Perfect led the Eugene Municipal Band in the first performance of the song on January 7, 1916.

For the song's most popular section, Perfect fashioned a new melody to fit into the harmony from "It's a Long Way to Tipperary", a hit 1912 World War I march. The catchy popularity of the harmony was not lost on Perfect, a man well-educated in music theory, who originally subtitled the song "The Tipperary of the West." Over the years there have been several changes to the lyrics and, today, the middle stanza is generally the only one sung and it is done so using more modern lyrics than the original.

The song is played during all home football and basketball games as well as from speakers atop the Erb Memorial Union (the school's student union) weekdays at noon and 6 p.m. In addition, it is played from atop the EMU on Commencement Day.

The song is used as the fight song for several high schools: Aberdeen High School, Bellevue West High School, Cane Bay High School, Canyon View High School, Cleveland High School, North Canyon High School, North Douglas High School, Gainesville High School (Virginia), and Okeechobee High School.

"Mighty Oregon" was also the fight song of Elkhart Memorial High School, which closed when it merged with Elkhart Central High School, and was the fight song for Frankfurt American High School, which closed in 1995 when US forces left Frankfurt, Germany.

== Lyrics ==
Oregon, our Alma Mater
We will guard thee on and on
Fellows gather 'round and cheer her
Chant her glory, Oregon!
Roar the praises of her warriors
Sing the story, Oregon
On to victory urge the heroes
Of our Mighty Oregon!

Go! Ducks! Go!
Fight! Ducks! Fight!
Go!
Fight!
Win! Ducks! Win!

Oregon, our Alma Mater
We will guard thee on and on
Fellows gather 'round and cheer her
Chant her glory, Oregon!
Roar the praises of her warriors
Sing the story, Oregon
On to victory urge the heroes
Of our Mighty Oregon!

== See also ==
- O (gesture)
