= Frederick Alexander Cuthbert =

American architect

Frederick A. Cuthbert
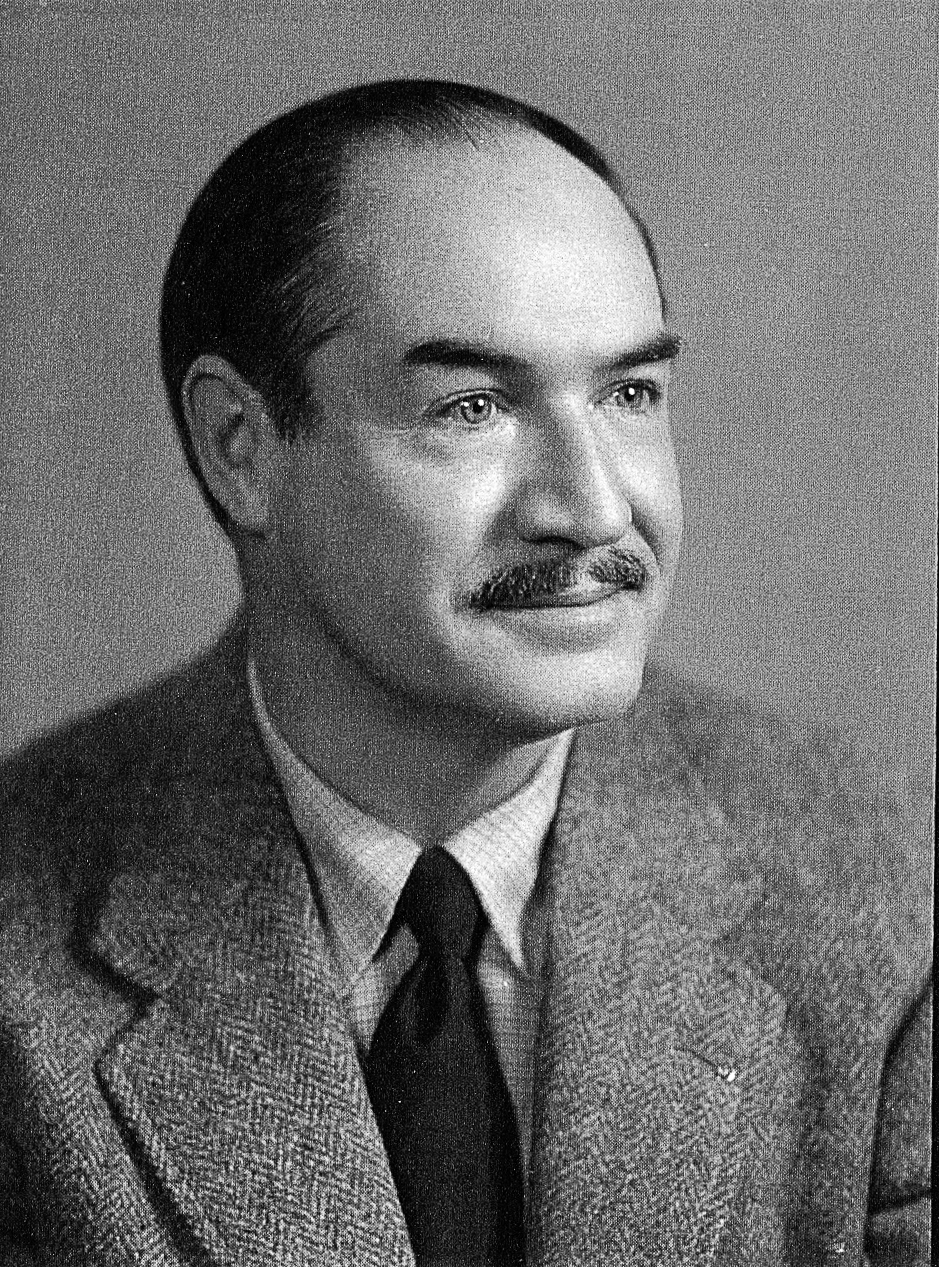
- Fred Cuthbert at the University of Oregon
- Born: May 7, 1902; Essex, Ontario, Canada
- Died: September 14, 1978 (aged 76); Lane County, Oregon, US
- Education: University of Michigan
- Occupation: Architect

Frederick Alexander Cuthbert (May 7, 1902 – September 14, 1978) was an American landscape architect who worked primarily in the U.S. state of Oregon.

== Biography ==
He was born in Essex, Ontario, Canada where his father was a Baptist minister. In 1908, the family moved to Muskegon, Michigan. Cuthbert graduated from the University of Michigan in 1928 with a Masters of Landscape Design and began teaching at Oregon Agricultural College. He was hired by the University of Oregon as the landscape architect in 1932, and when the landscape program was transferred to the University of Oregon, Cuthbert founded the Department of Landscape Architecture in 1934. Later he became Dean of the School of Architecture and Allied Arts.

Cuthbert's designs influenced many landscapes at the University of Oregon. Two of Cuthbert's landscapes, the Memorial Quadrangle and the Women's Memorial Quadrangle, are listed on the National Register of Historic Places. Cuthbert directed the construction of Dad's Gates, designed by H. Abbott Lawrence, which is also listed on the NRHP.

Off campus, his work was central to community landscapes, including the Eugene Mall, Corvallis High School, and the Oregon State Capitol in Salem.

The Marie and Arthur Berger Scholarship, established in 1972, is awarded to architecture students at the University of Oregon and honors Cuthbert, Marie Berger’s instructor at Oregon Agricultural College. The Cuthbert Amphitheater at Eugene's Alton Baker Park is named in honor of Cuthbert, the park's designer.
