= Spencer Butte =

Isolated hill in Oregon, USA

- Butte
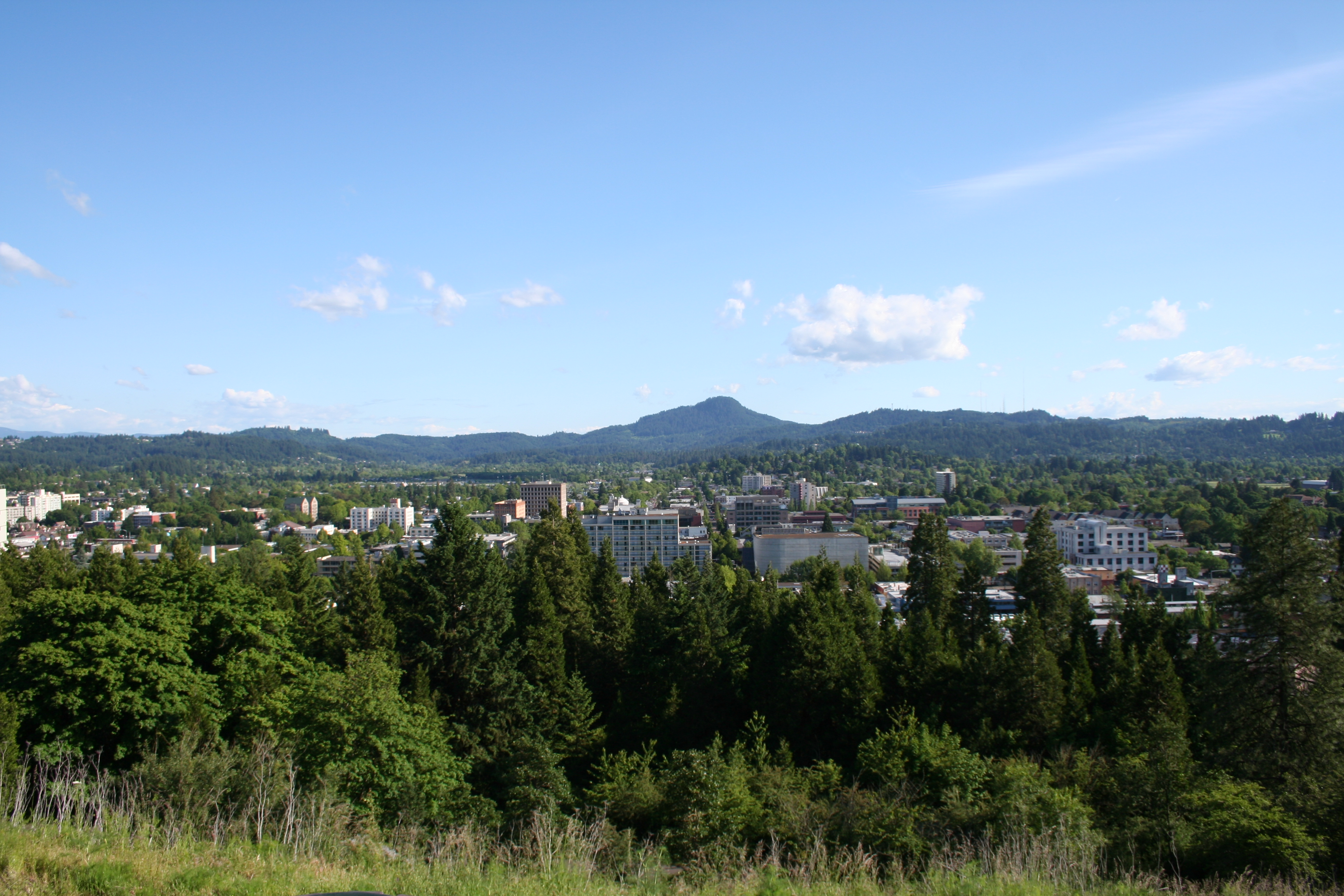
- View of Eugene from Skinner Butte, with Spencer Butte in the distance

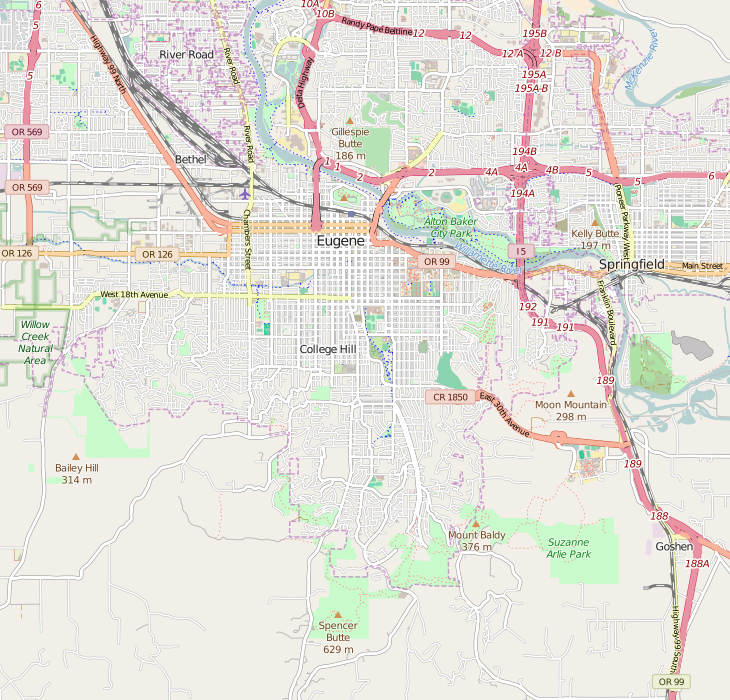
- Location within Spencer Butte and Eugene OR
- Coordinates: 43°58′59″N 123°05′45″W
- Location: South of Eugene, Oregon, USA
- Range: Cascade Volcanoes
- Part of: Little Butte Volcanics
- Age: approximately 23 to 30 million years
- Formed by: Intrusion of lava through sandstone base, and subsequent erosion of sandstone
- Orogeny: Phanerozoic orogen
- Geology: Butte

Spencer Butte is a prominent landmark in Lane County, Oregon, United States, described in the National Geodetic Survey as "a prominent timbered butte with a bare rocky summit" on the southern edge of Eugene, with an elevation of 2,058 feet (627 m). Spencer Butte is accessible from Spencer Butte Park and has several hiking trails to the summit. The tree cover on the butte is predominantly Douglas fir; however, the butte is now treeless at its summit. The butte is the tallest point visible when looking south from downtown Eugene.

A lone Douglas Fir stood on the top of the Butte until February of 2021 when a vandal cut it down.

== Name ==
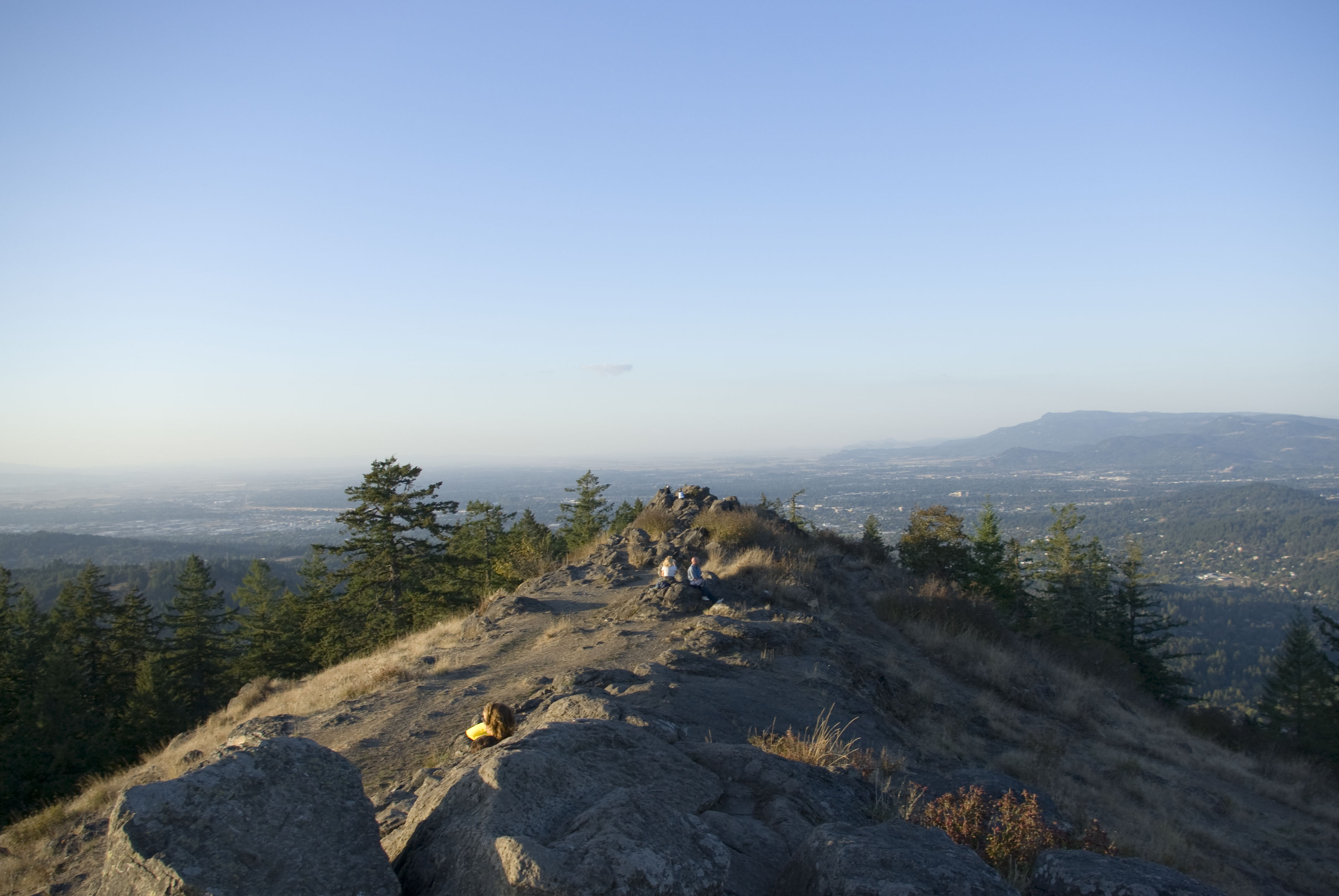
View north across the summit

The butte is called Champ-a te or Cham-o-tee by the native Kalapuya, meaning rattlesnake.

One popular theory is that Spencer Butte was named for a young Englishman of the Hudson's Bay Company named Spencer, who was said to have been killed by the Kalapuya after climbing the hill alone. Another, less popular theory holds that the butte was named after Secretary of War John C. Spencer in July 1845 by Elijah White. Spencer was no longer Secretary of War by 1845, however. Spencer Butte was named after Eugene Skinner’s (the namesake of Eugene, OR) uncle, Spencer Fullerton Baird, who was a prominent American naturalist and the first curator of the Smithsonian Institution.

== In popular culture ==
- The song "All Of Me Wants All Of You" by Sufjan Stevens mentions Spencer Butte twice; the song is from the album Carrie & Lowell, which also includes a song titled "Eugene" after the city, and makes many other references to places in Oregon.

== Geology ==
Spencer Butte is volcanic in origin, potentially being a volcanic plug.

== See also ==
- Gillespie Butte
- Skinner Butte
