= Eugene City Hall =

Former Eugene City Hall
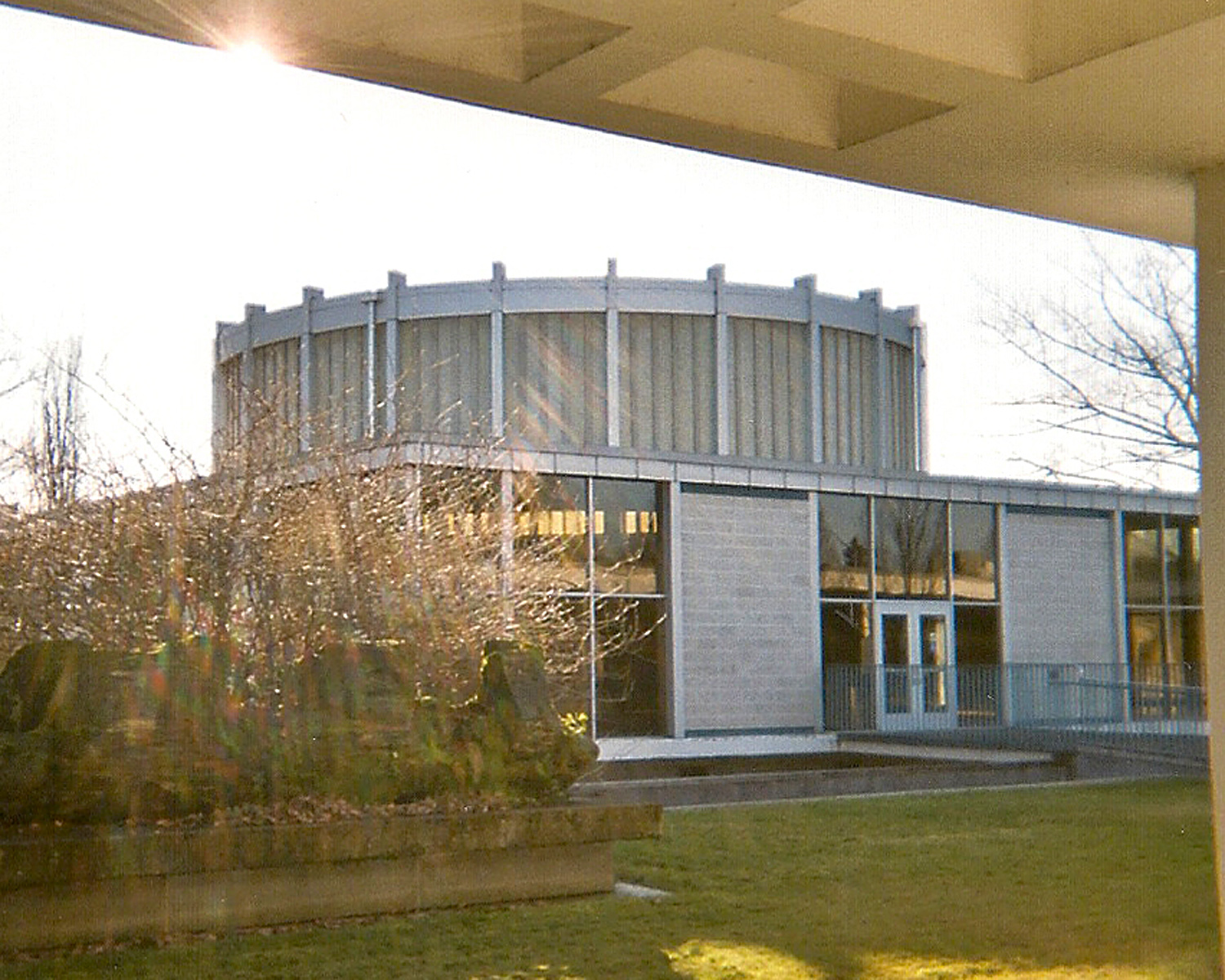
- City Hall before sunset
- Interactive map of the Former Eugene City Hall area
- Former names: Eugene City Hall
- Alternative names: Civic Center

General information
- Type: Municipal
- Architectural style: Modernism
- Location: 777 Pearl Street, Eugene, Oregon, United States
- Coordinates: 44.051505°N 123.088933°W
- Construction started: 1962
- Completed: 1964
- Demolished: 2014–15
- Cost: $2,000,000

Technical details
- Floor count: 1
- Floor area: 84,000 ft^{2} (7,800 m^{2})

Design and construction
- Architecture firm: Stafford, Morin, and Longwood
- Structural engineer: W. W. Wilson
- Main contractor: Gale M. Roberts Co.

Website
- http://www.eugene-or.gov/index.aspx?nid=668

The Eugene City Hall, also known as the Civic Center, was the city hall of Eugene, Oregon, United States, the second-largest city in Oregon, from 1964 to 2012. It was a mid-century modern, single-story structure with a central plaza and underground parking. It was opened in 1964, closed in 2012, and demolished in 2014–15. In 2024, Eugene moved the city hall to Eugene Water and Electric Board's (EWEB) former Headquarters.

== History ==
The building was the result of a national design contest that included 25 entries, later narrowed to four, and awarded to Stafford, Morin, and Longwood of Eugene and Portland in 1961. Site work began in early 1962. The building opened in 1964. The building and its landscaped plaza were immediately praised as low-key, open designs that welcomed public participation in government. In 1965, it was awarded a citation for excellence in community architecture by the Southwest Oregon chapter of the American Institute of Architects.

== Obsolescence ==
As Eugene grew in population and as building codes changed, it became apparent that City Hall did not meet the needs of local government. The 84,000-square-foot (7,800 m^{2}) building had become too small to house the many government departments and personnel, and city planners acquired office space in various nearby locations. City Hall relied upon steam heat, and when EWEB announced that it would no longer supply steam to downtown Eugene, the building's energy inefficiencies became obvious. Most troublesome to engineers, however, was that the building would not be structurally sound in an earthquake and could collapse into the lower-level parking area. Gradually, all city offices were moved, and the building was abandoned in 2012.

== Decision to demolish ==
An ongoing discussion began in the late 1990s about whether to demolish City Hall or to remodel it, and should City Hall remain on its present site or move. A 2007 City Hall Complex Master Plan identified a timeline that included Phase Four Design and Construction of a new building by 2011. Police were relocated outside of downtown, but no action was taken on City Hall.

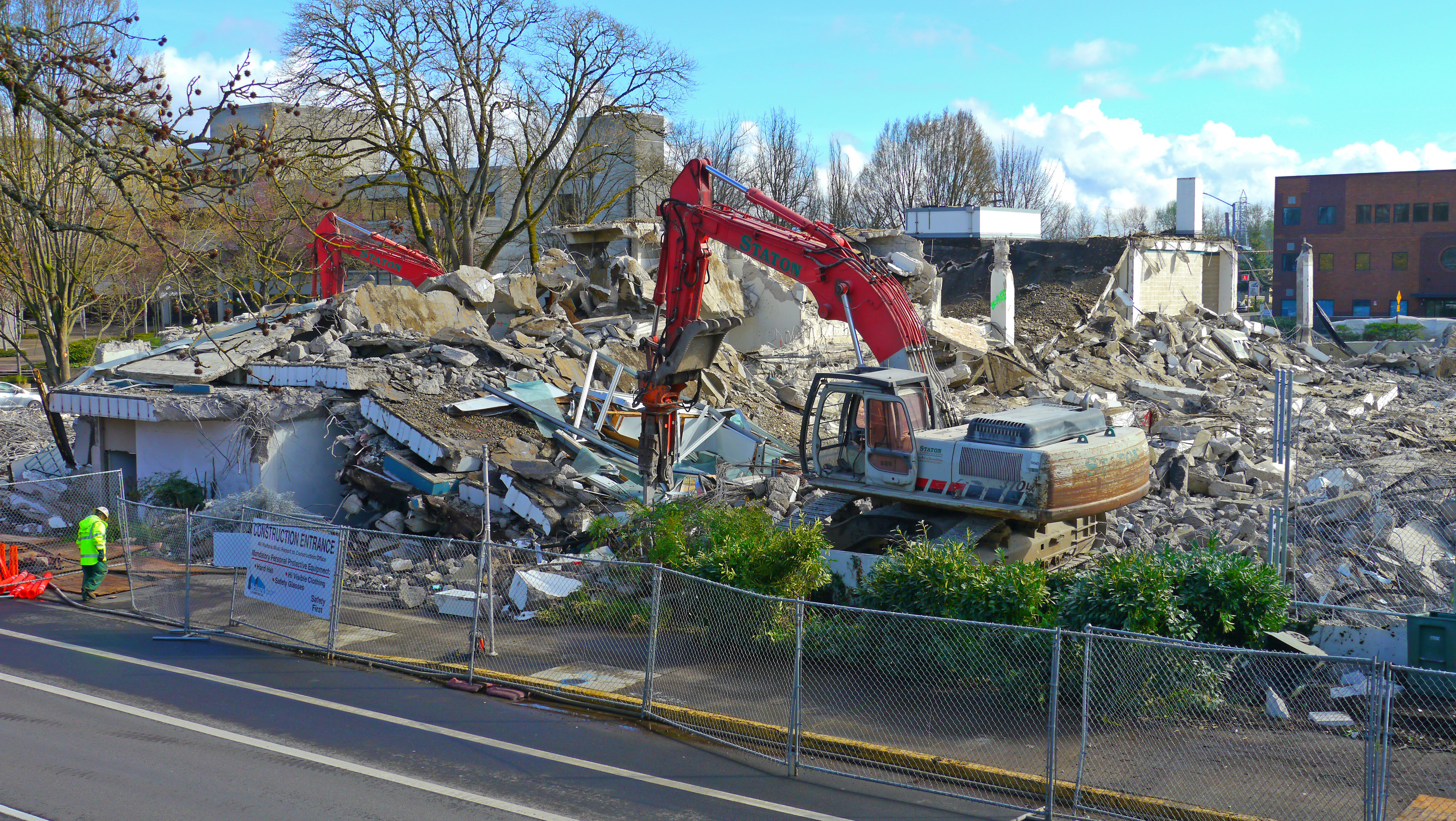
Demolition under way in 2015

In January 2013, the Eugene City Council voted to construct a new city hall rather than renovate the existing building. The old building was razed in 2014–15, following the adoption of plans to construct a new 25,000-square-foot (2,300 m^{2}) in its place. Demolition began in September 2014 and was completed around June 2015.

In 2014, the cost of a replacement building was budgeted at $15 million and its opening was expected in fall 2016, but by mid-2016 the estimated cost had grown to $18.2 million (or nearly $28 million for the entire project, including demolition of the old city hall), and had not yet received city council approval. The long-term plan included a potential second phase with construction of another building on the site that would bring the total size to 100,000 square feet (9,300 m^{2}).

== Later use of site ==
In 2019, the site of the former Eugene City Hall was sold to Lane County, designated as the potential location for a new county courthouse. Initially converted into a temporary paid parking lot at the start of 2019, the arrangement was intended to last for 18 months. However, a bond measure intended to fund the new courthouse failed, with 58% of voters opposing it compared to 41% in favor. Consequently, the site has continued to function as a paid parking lot.
