= Gillespie Butte =

Hill in Eugene, Oregon, U.S.

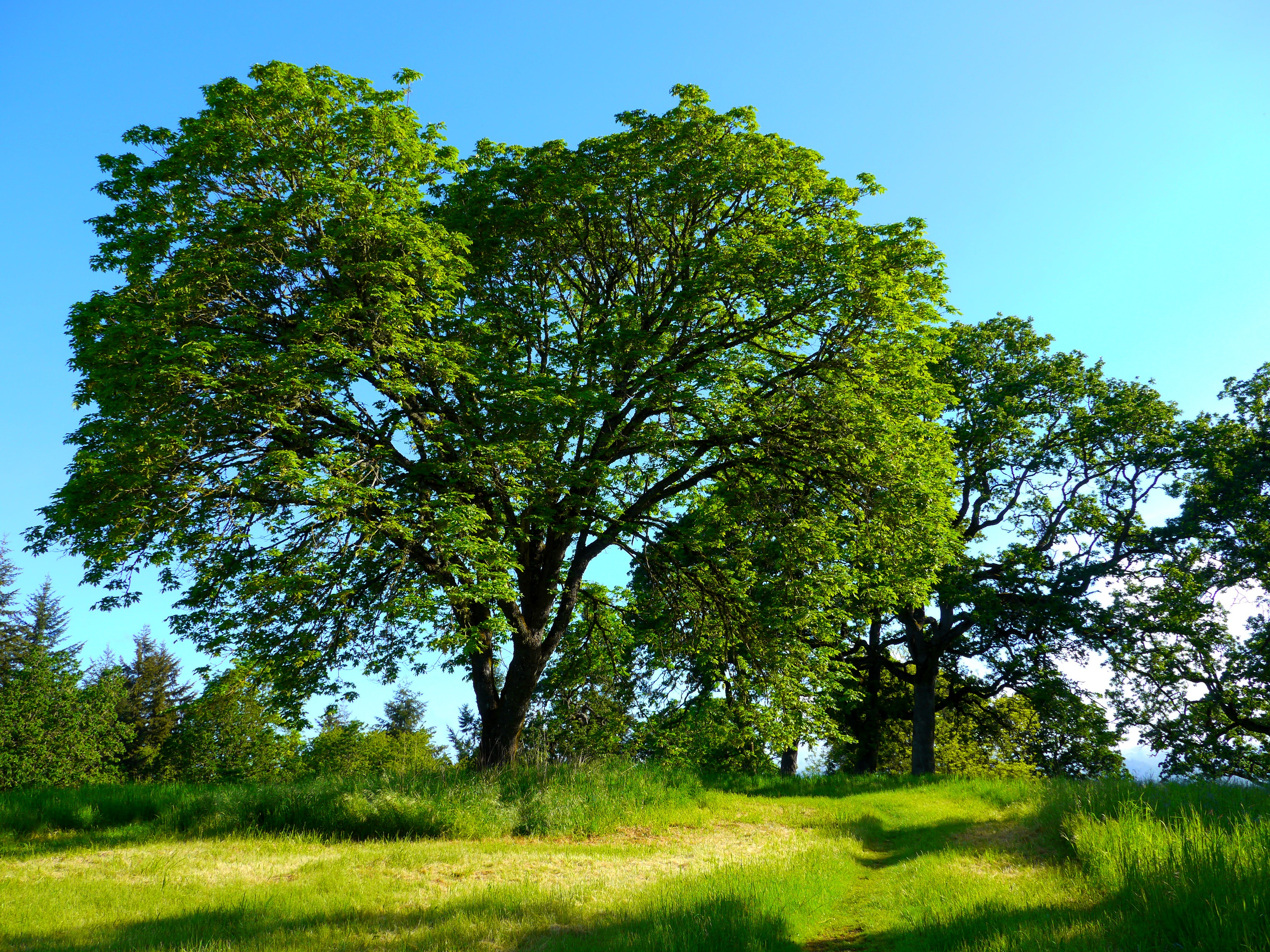
- Atop Gillespie Butte

Highest point
- Coordinates: 44.0719°N 123.09282°W

Geography
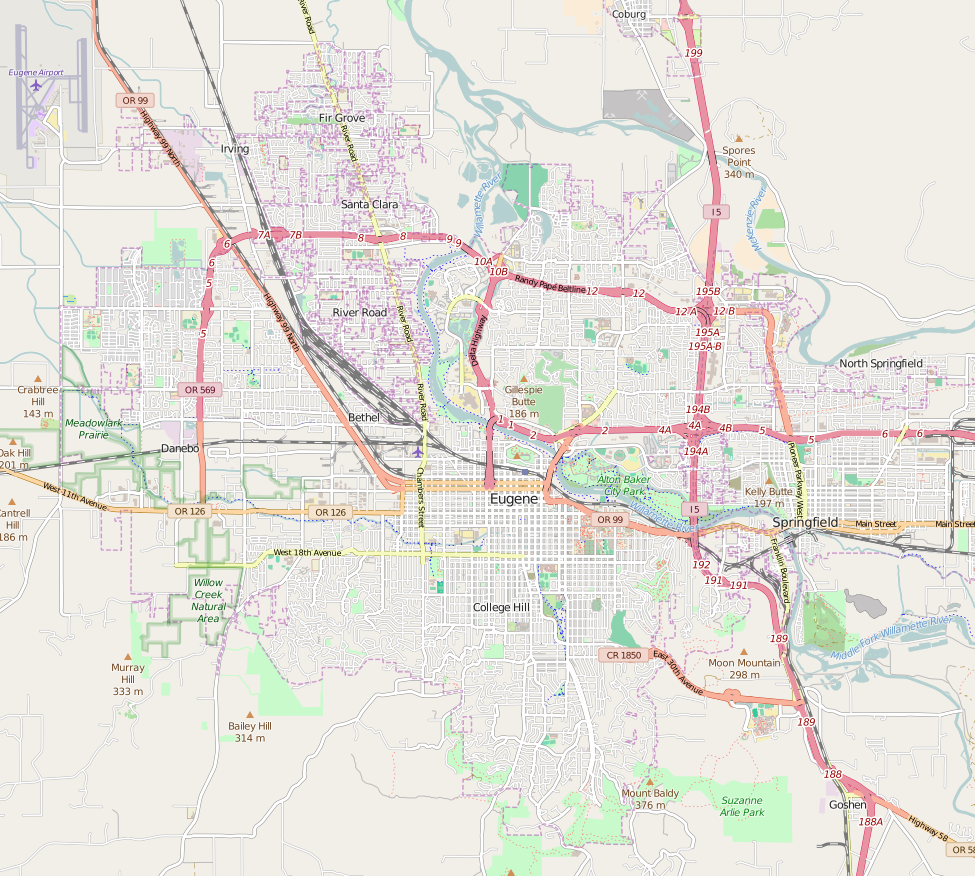
- Location within Eugene OR Location within Oregon

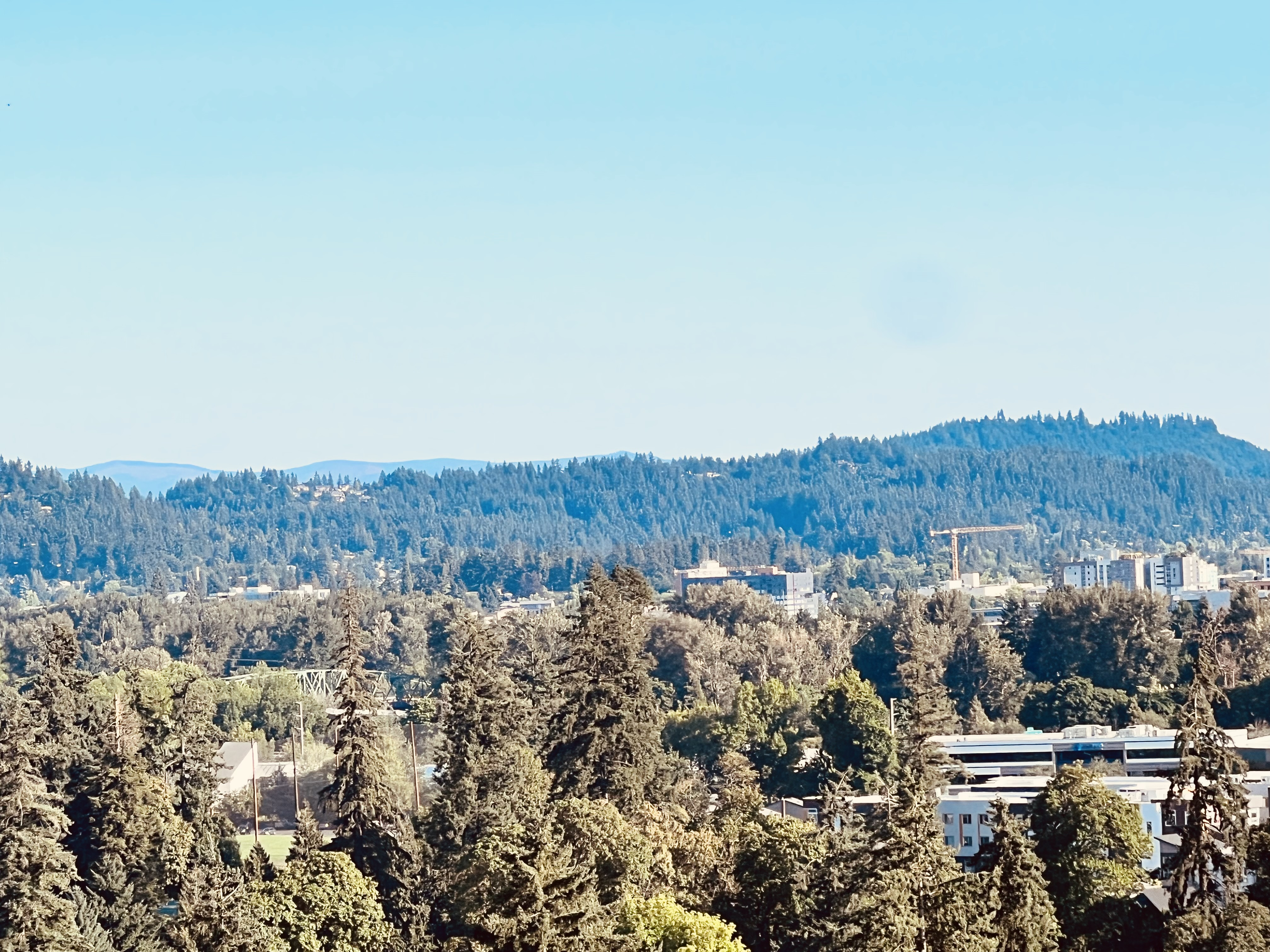
View from Gillespie Butte

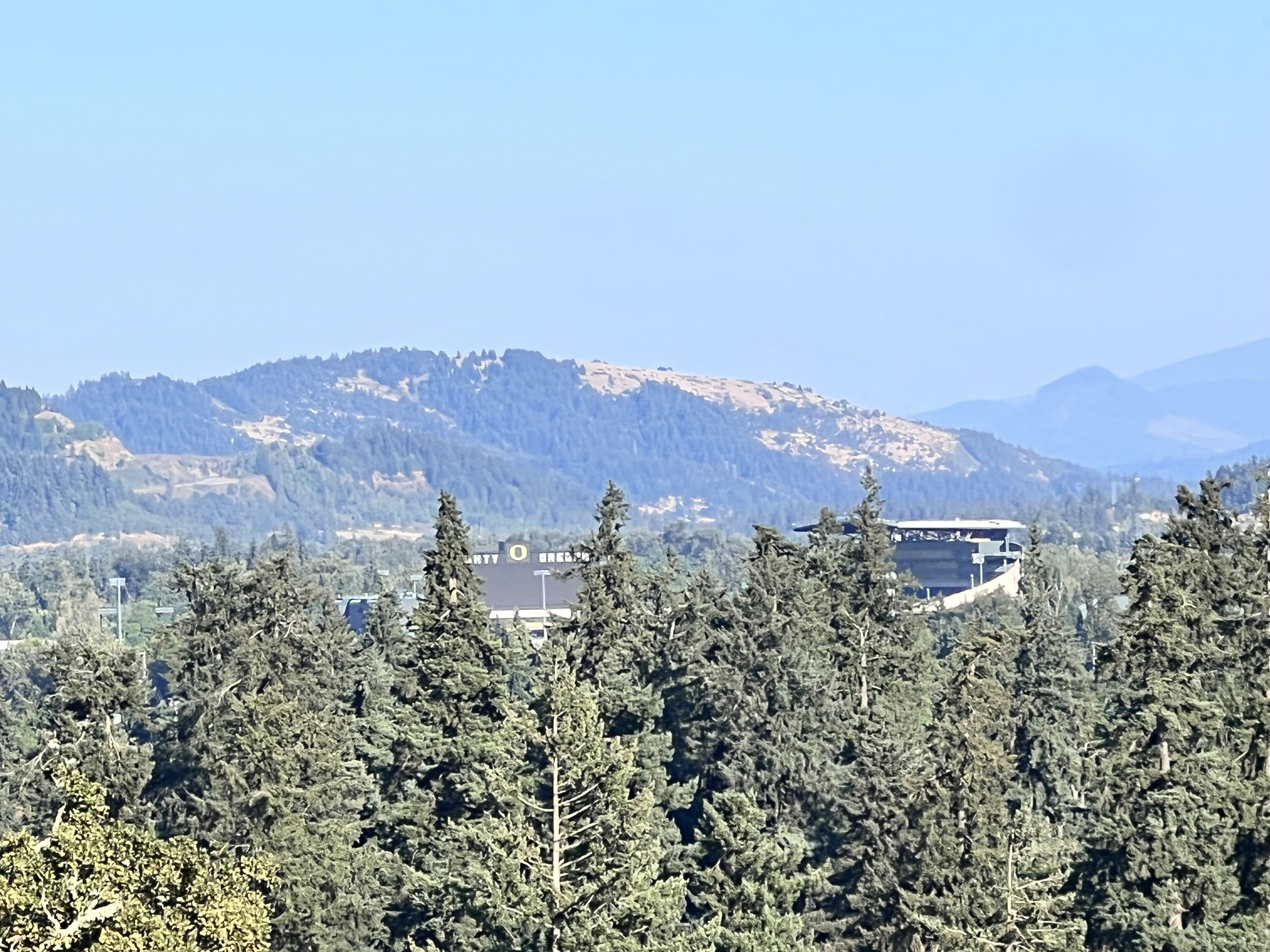
Autzen Stadium visible through the trees

Gillespie Butte is a hill in Eugene, Oregon, in the United States. Gillespie Butte is located in Lane County, Oregon, in the western part of the country. The butte is 610 feet (186 m) above sea level, or 210 feet (64 m) above the surrounding terrain. It is about 1.3 miles (2.1 km) wide at its base.

The butte is full of oak trees and offers views of the city from all directions, including of Autzen Stadium and downtown Eugene.

The butte was named for the Reverend Jacob Gillespie, who came to Oregon from Missouri in 1851, and who took up land near the butte. He was virtually founder of the Cumberland Presbyterian church in Eugene, and held a slave in Oregon, despite the formal prohibition of slavery in the territory (and, after 1859, state). His two daughters married William and Thomas Goodpasture.

The terrain around Gillespie Butte is flat to the northwest, but hilly to the southeast. The highest point in the area is Coburg Ridge, at 2,250 feet (686 m) above sea level, 6 miles (9.8 km) northeast of Gillespie Butte. It is located within the city limits of Eugene, the center of which is 1.4 miles (2.3 km) south of Gillespie Butte. The area around Gillespie Butte is almost entirely residential, with several housing developments on the butte itself. It is on the primarily suburban north side of Eugene, within the boundaries of the Cal Young Neighborhood Association, not far from the Valley River Center mall and the Eugene Country Club golf course.

The climate is Mediterranean. The average temperature is 12 °C. The warmest month is July, at 24 °C, and the coldest is January, at 2 °C. The average rainfall is 1,641 mm per year. The wettest month is March, at 242 mm of rain, and the driest is July, at 9 mm.

The butte is home to a city park, spanning 5.07 acres. It is also home to a cemetery.

== See also ==
- Skinner Butte
- Spencer Butte
