= Skinner Butte =

Hill in Oregon, U.S.

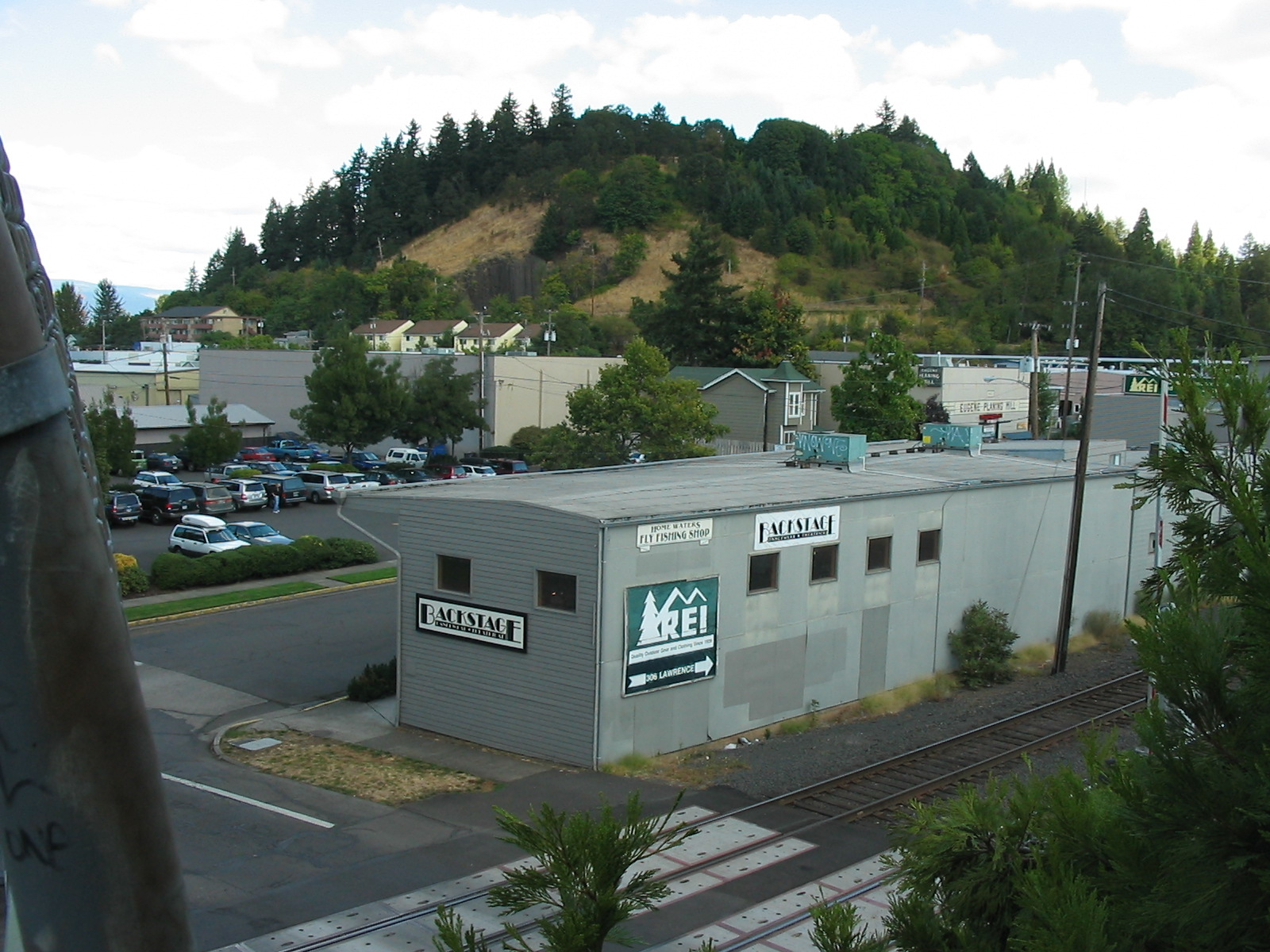
- Skinner Butte from the west in 2006

Highest point
- Coordinates: 44.05861°N 123.09306°W

Geography
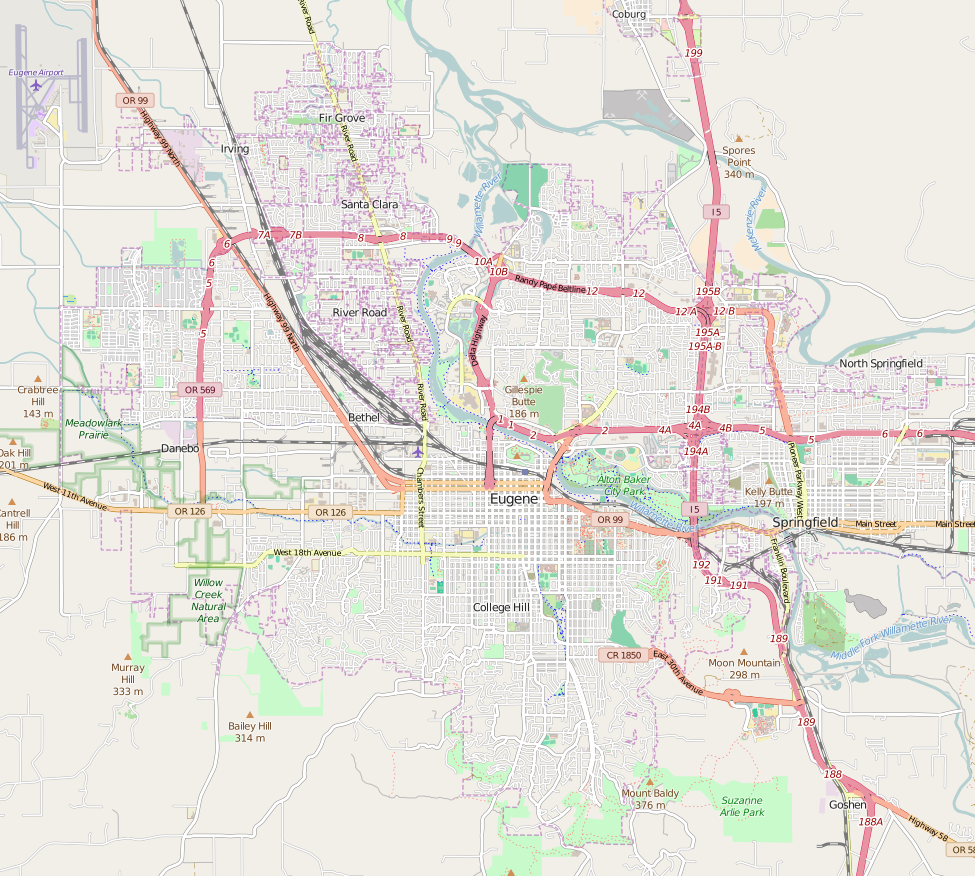
- Location within Eugene OR Location within Oregon

Skinner Butte (often mistakenly called Skinner's Butte) is a prominent hill on the north edge of downtown Eugene, Oregon, United States, near the Willamette River. A local landmark, it honors city founder Eugene Skinner and is the site of the city's Skinner Butte Park.

The butte once displayed the burned letters "KKK" in the 1920s and more recently a controversial cross or war memorial. The cross was replaced several times, but wasn't permanently removed until 1997. One of the objections to the cross was its perceived association with Ku Klux Klan (Eugene grew to be a recognized national stronghold for the KKK through the 1950s.)

== Description ==
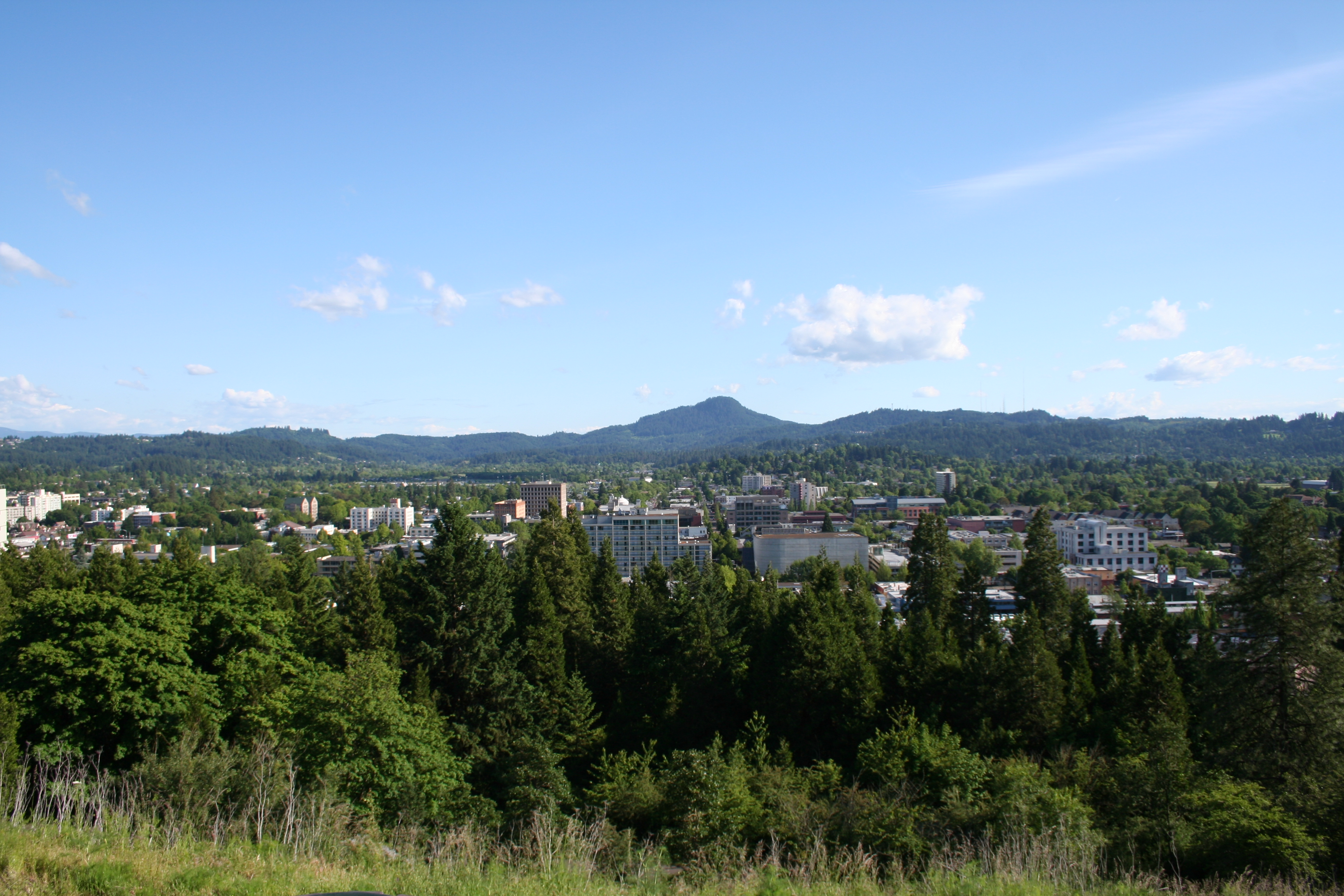
The view of downtown Eugene from the top of Skinner Butte

The elevation at the top of Skinner Butte is 682 feet (208 m) above sea level, approximately 200 feet (60 m) above the surrounding city. A winding road leads to the summit, which provides a comprehensive view of the city. The public park features hiking trails and open lawns.

The butte is also the location of a giant "O" emblem (representing the University of Oregon) visible from the air and the city. Less visible is the "Big E" for Eugene High School (renamed South Eugene High School in 1957). These emblems were erected in the early 20th century.

The "O" was formerly lit before the Civil War football game against Oregon State. In 2010, the Big "O" was added to the National Register of Historic Places. A small reservoir is located on public land on the east flank of the butte below the summit.

== History ==
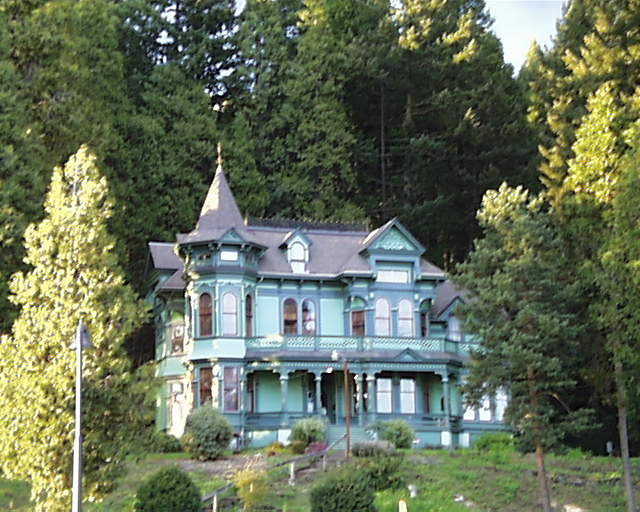
Shelton-McMurphey House

The butte was known as "Ya-Po-Ah" in the language of the Kalapuya, who inhabited the Willamette Valley before the arrival of Euro-American settlers in the 19th century. In 1846, Eugene Skinner, an American settler who had arrived in the valley after traveling overland to California, erected a cabin near the butte on the advice of the Kalupuya, who warned him about floods on the Willamette. Skinner's cabin became the basis for his Donation Land Claim. The site of the cabin is commemorated today by a marker on the hillside. A replica of the cabin has been located in various places in the park over the years.

Skinner Butte Park was dedicated in 1914. According to the Register-Guard, "at one point, the park...included a car camp, a zoo and, during the Depression, a Civilian Conservation Corps regional camp."

The park is a popular site for rockclimbing (on "The Columns" the site of a former basalt quarry on the west side of the butte that operated from the 1890s through the 1930s) and birding, among other recreational activities. In July 2006, the City of Eugene opened a new playground, RiverPlay Discovery Village Playground, in the park.

The butte is also the site of the Shelton-McMurphey-Johnson House, a Queen Anne Victorian residence built in 1880 by a family that once owned the entire butte. Before trees grew up and obscured it, the house was known as the "Castle on the Hill". It was added to the National Register of Historic Places in 1984. The name "Ya-Po-Ah" lives on in "Ya-Po-Ah Terrace", a controversial high-rise retirement home built at the foot of the butte in 1968.

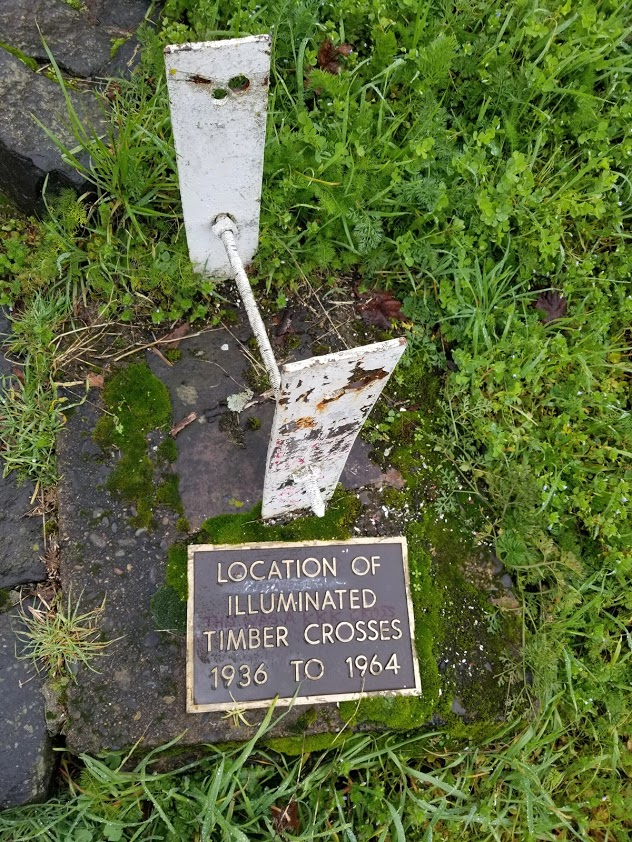
A marker indicates the location of illuminated crosses between 1936 and 1964

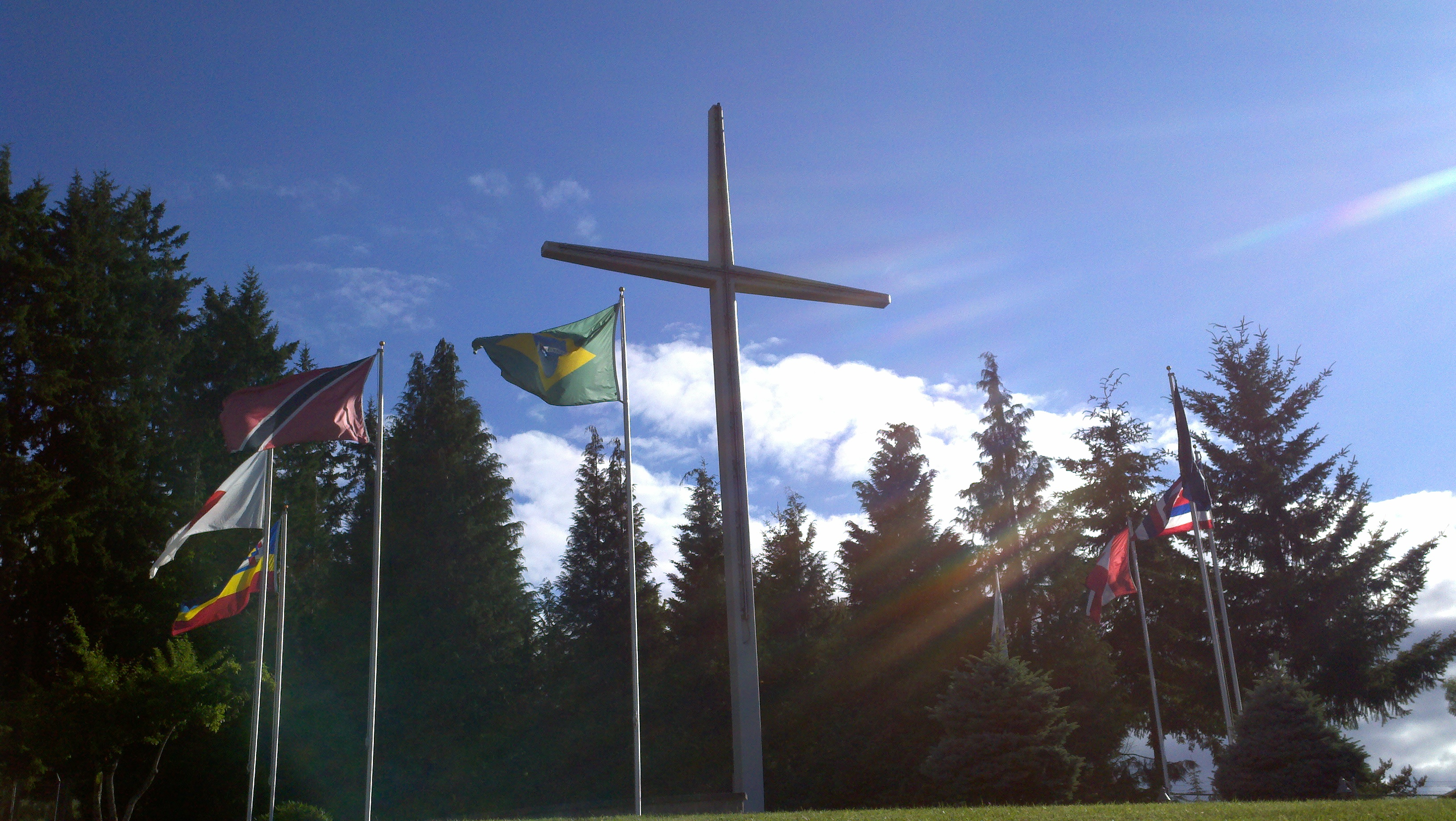
The Skinner Butte Cross at New Hope Christian College (formerly Eugene Bible College)

=== Cross controversy ===
A concrete cross was installed on Skinner Butte in late November 1964.

From the opinion of the 9th Federal Circuit Court, the official history of this controversy is as follows:

The City of Eugene ("City") maintains a public park on and around Skinner's Butte [sic], a hill cresting immediately north of the City's downtown business district. The land was donated to the City and has been maintained as a public park for many years. From the late 1930s to 1964, private individuals erected a succession of wooden crosses in the park, one replacing another as they deteriorated. In 1964, private individuals erected the cross at issue in this litigation. It is a fifty-one-foot (16 m) concrete Latin cross with neon inset tubing, and it is located at the crest of Skinner's Butte [sic]. The parties who erected the cross did not seek the City's permission to do so beforehand; however, they subsequently applied for and received from the City a building permit and an electrical permit.

Since 1970, the City has illuminated the cross for seven days during the Christmas season, five days during the Thanksgiving season, and on Memorial Day, Independence Day, and Veterans Day.

The cross has been the subject of litigation since the time it was erected. In 1969, the Oregon Supreme Court held that the cross violated both the federal and the Oregon Constitutions because it was erected with a religious purpose and created the inference of official endorsement of Christianity. Lowe v. City of Eugene, 463 P.2d 360, 362-63 (Or. 1969), cert. denied, 397 U.S. 1042, rehearing denied, 398 U.S. 944 (1970). Soon after, the City held a charter amendment election, and on May 26, 1970, the voters, by a wide margin, approved an amendment to the City Charter designating the cross a war memorial. Pursuant to that amendment, the cross was deeded to the City as a gift, and a bronze plaque was placed at the foot of the cross dedicating it as a memorial to war veterans. The Eugene City Charter provides that the "concrete cross on the south slope of the butte shall remain at that location and in that form as property of the city and is hereby dedicated as a memorial to the veterans of all wars in which the United States has participated."

As a result of the 9th Federal Circuit's ruling in August 1996, the cross was removed on June 12, 1997, and reinstalled twelve days later at Eugene Bible College in west Eugene, south of Churchill High School. Former congressman Charlie Porter, a Eugene attorney, advocated for the removal of the cross. A flagpole flying an American flag was erected in its place on the butte.

== See also ==
- Gillespie Butte
- Spencer Butte
