= Eugene Skinner =

American pioneer

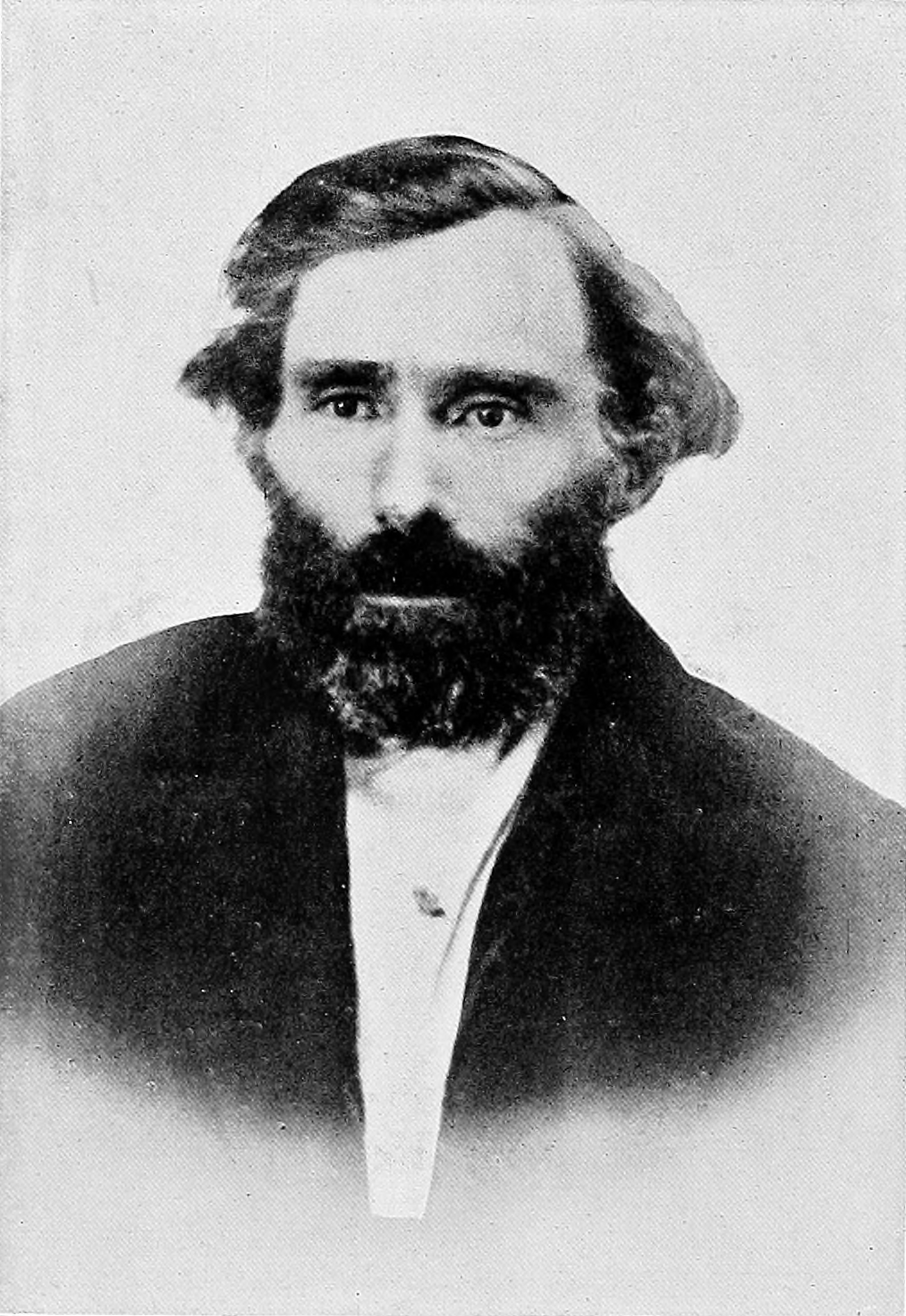
- Born: Eugene Franklin Skinner; September 13, 1809; Essex, New York
- Died: December 15, 1864 (aged 55); Eugene, Oregon
- Resting place: Masonic Cemetery in Eugene
- Occupations: sheriff, ferry operator, farmer, lawyer
- Known for: founder of the city of Eugene, Oregon (1851)
- Spouse: Mary Cook (m. 1839)
- Children: 4 daughters: Mary, Leonora, Phoebe, and Amelia; 1 son: St John

Eugene Franklin Skinner (September 13, 1809 – December 15, 1864) was an early American settler in Oregon and the founder of the city of Eugene, Oregon, which is named after him.

Skinner was born in Essex, New York. His father was Major John Joseph Skinner and his brother was St John Skinner, assistant postmaster under President Andrew Johnson. His mother died while Skinner was young. At age 14, Skinner moved with his family to Green County, Wisconsin. As an adult, Skinner lived in Plattsburgh, New York briefly before settling in Hennepin, Illinois as county sheriff. He married Mary Cook on November 28, 1839.

In May 1845, he and his wife Mary Cook Skinner traveled overland to California, wintering at Sutter's Fort. In 1846, the Skinners headed north to the Oregon Country, joining the party of Elijah Bristow in exploring the Willamette Valley south of present-day Lane County, Oregon. Skinner took a claim downriver of Bristow's claim, and was advised by the local Kalapuya Indian tribe to build high up due to floods. Following this advice, he built his first cabin on the hill now known as Skinner Butte.

The Skinners farmed and raised a family of five children: four daughters (Mary, Leonora, Phoebe, and Amelia) and one son, St John. Skinner operated a ferry service across the Willamette River. Historian Robert Clark suggests that Skinner deliberately chose the land he claimed because it was the best location for a local ferry monopoly. After Oregon was organized as a US territory in 1849, Skinner became the local postmaster.

In 1851, Skinner and local judge David Matteson Risdon laid out the town of Eugene City (shortened to "Eugene" in 1889). Skinner donated a portion of his property for county buildings, and took up practicing law, serving as a county clerk and trustee for Eugene City.

Skinner took ill after trying to save his cattle during a flood in 1861, and suffered ill health for the last few years of his life before dying in Eugene on December 15, 1864. He was buried in the Masonic Cemetery in Eugene.

== See also ==
- Statue of Eugene Skinner, installed outside the Eugene Public Library
