= KRVM =

KRVM may refer to:

- KRVM (AM), a radio station (1280 AM) licensed to Eugene, Oregon, United States
- KRVM-FM, a radio station (91.9 FM) licensed to Eugene, Oregon, United States
