= Eugene International High School =

- Eugene, Oregon; United States

Information
- Type: Secondary School
- Established: 1984
- Grades: 9-12
- Website: ihs.4j.lane.edu

Eugene International High School is a high school located in Eugene, Oregon, United States. Part of the Eugene School District, it is an alternative school in international studies located at its three host schools: South Eugene High School, Sheldon High School, and Churchill High School. Students are given a global perspective in the course of study and are required to take a foreign language. Its instruction meets requirements for the International Baccalaureate Program, however it does not require students to pursue the full diploma program. The subjects covered by the school include literature, history, geography, social studies, and health, while math, science, foreign language, physical education, and electives are covered by its host schools. Immersion programs are available at all 3 campuses in French, Chinese, and Spanish, respectively.

== Location ==
Eugene International High School is hosted by three traditional high schools in the area:

- Sheldon High School 44.08145°N 123.07258°W
- South Eugene High School 44.0388°N 123.087°W
- Churchill High School 44.03929°N 123.15017°W
