= Willamette High School =

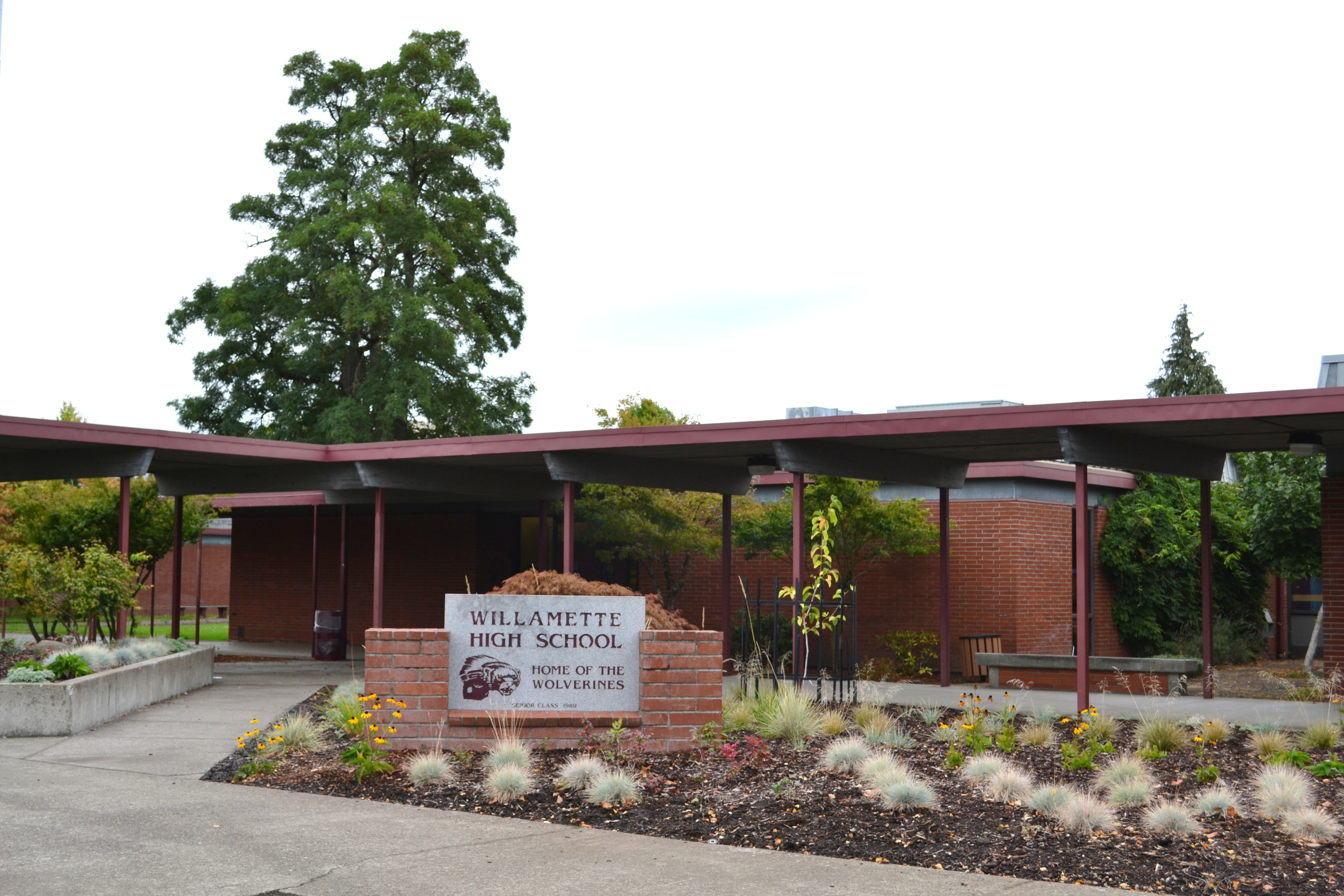

Location
- 1801 Echo Hollow Road; Eugene, Oregon, (Lane County) 97402; United States
- Coordinates: 44.0821°N 123.1672°W

Information
- Type: Public
- Motto: Velocius quam Amicorum Natare
- Opened: 1949
- School district: Bethel School District
- Principal: Alyssa Dodds
- Grades: 9-12
- Enrollment: 1,435 (2016-17)
- Colors: Maroon, White, and Black
- Athletics conference: OSAA 6A-7 Southwest Conference
- Mascot: Wolverine
- Team name: Wolverines
- Website: Willamatte Homepage

Willamette High School, or "Wil-Hi", is located in the Bethel-Danebo area of west Eugene, Oregon, United States. It is one of two high schools in the Bethel School District along with Kalapuya High School.

== History ==
Willamette High School first opened to students on September 26, 1949. The opening of Bethel School District's only comprehensive high school was the culmination of a process that began on April 9, 1948. On this date, the rural Lane County, Oregon communities of Bethel, Clear Lake, Danebo and Irving passed a measure to consolidate and build the high school. A 50-acre (200,000 m^{2}) school site was purchased on May 17, 1948. Funding was provided by bond levies passed on May 11, 1948, and October 20, 1948. Willamette was an early candidate for interior filming location in Grease. In November 2012, Bethel voters approved a $10 million science wing. In 2022 a new $3 million CTE building was approved for classes like graphic design, photography and kitchen type classes to take place.

== Academics ==
In 2008, 79% of the school's seniors received a high school diploma. Of 316 students, 251 graduated, 37 dropped out, five received a modified diploma, and 23 were still in high school in 2009.

In 2022, 88% of the school's seniors had a high school diploma. Out of 359 students, 319 graduated, and 40 dropped out.

In 2025, Willamette High School increased its graduation rate from 89.9% to 91.6%, which was the highest graduation record yet. (https://willamette.bethel.k12.or.us/index.php?pageID=smartSiteFeed&psqFeed=true&articleID=70766439)

Willamette High School offers two Advanced Placement (AP) classes and opportunities for college credit through Lane Community College. The school also offers limited night school classes for students and district patrons for credit recovery.

== Athletics ==
Willamette High School athletic teams compete in the OSAA 6A-7 Southwest Conference (excluding football, which competes in 5A-SD2). The athletic director is Bill Wagner and the Bookkeeper/Accountant is Laura Canaday.

State Championships:

- Boys Track and Field: 1985
- Boys Cross Country: 1957, 1958
- Cheerleading: 1985, 1989, 1992, 1996, 2000
- Girls Basketball: 2007, 2009, 2013, 2014

=== Wolverine Stadium ===
Willamette's Wolverine Stadium was completely rebuilt after being burned down on August 2, 2003. The new stadium includes an artificial turf field.

== Notable alumni ==
- Brandon Beemer, 1998, actor and model, The Bold and the Beautiful
- Mickey Loomis, 1974, general manager of the New Orleans Saints
- Quintin Mikell, 1999, football player, Philadelphia Eagles
- Curtis Salgado, 1971, blues musician, who inspired John Belushi to form the Blues Brothers
