= Bethel, Eugene, Oregon =

Coordinates: 44.078707°N 123.171844°W

Bethel, also commonly referred to as Bethel-Danebo, is a neighborhood of west Eugene, Oregon, United States. The neighborhood boundaries are Oregon Route 99 on the east, the former Southern Pacific Coos Bay Line on the south, Green Hill Road on the west and Clear Lake Road on the north.

The neighborhood combines the names of two historic communities. The original location of Bethel is now within the Trainsong neighborhood.

Bethel School District is separate from the main Eugene school district.

== See also ==
- Irving, Eugene, Oregon
- Malabon, Oregon
