= KMKR =

KMKR may refer to:

- KMKR-LP, a low-power radio station (99.9 FM) licensed to serve Tucson, Arizona, United States
- KWRZ, a radio station (92.3 FM) licensed to serve Canyonville, Oregon, United States, which held the call sign KMKR from 2006 to 2013
- KAVE, a radio station (88.5 FM) licensed to serve Oakridge, Oregon, which held the call sign KMKR from 2004 to 2006
