= Winston Churchill High School (Eugene, Oregon) =

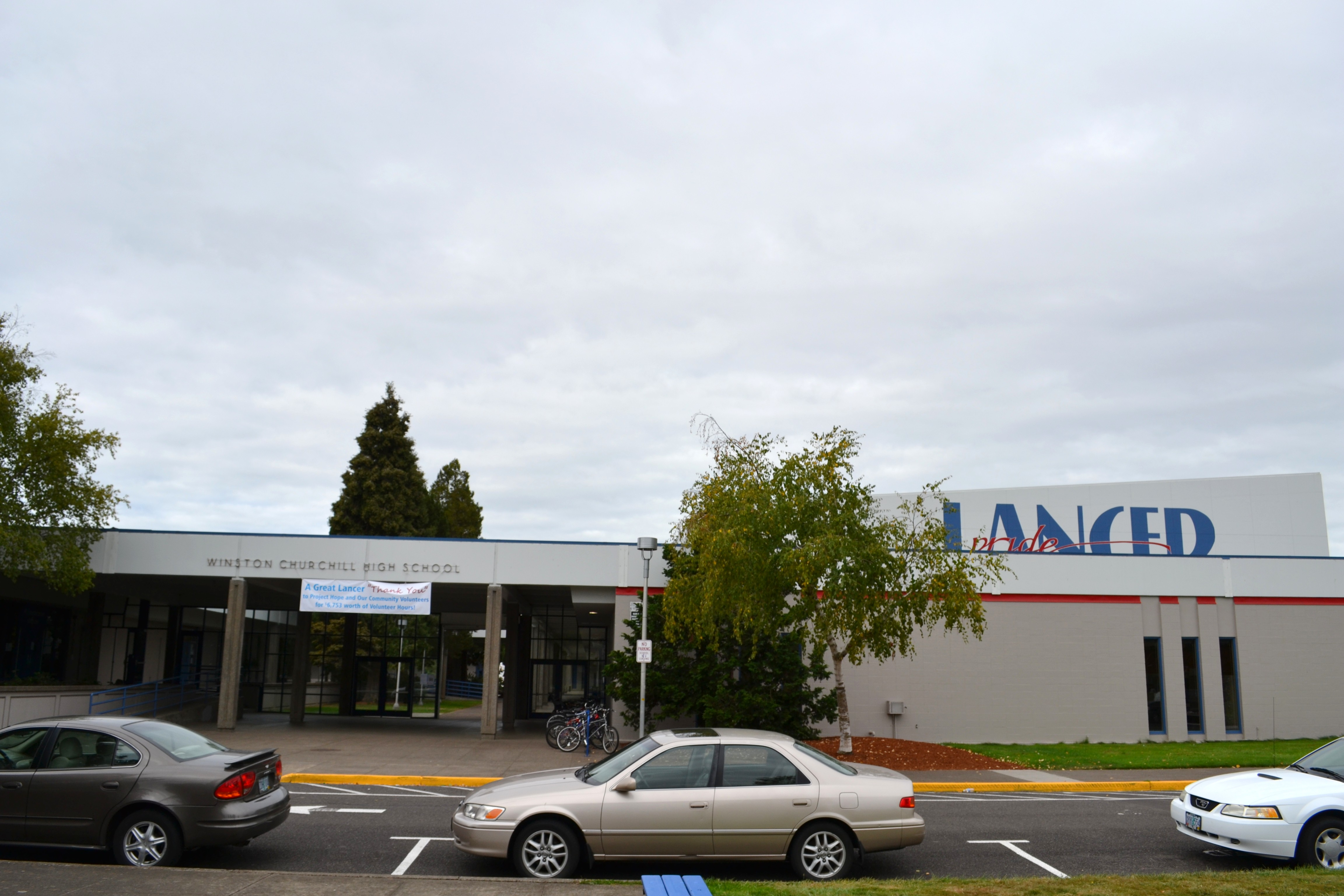

Location
- 1850 Bailey Hill Road; Eugene, Lane County, Oregon 97405; 44°02′21″N 123°09′01″W

Information
- Type: Public
- Motto: Lancer Pride
- Opened: 1966
- School district: Eugene School District
- Principal: Kevin Rodemack
- Teaching staff: 52.23 (FTE)
- Grades: 9–12
- Enrollment: 1,031 (2024–25)
- Student to teacher ratio: 19.74
- Colors: Red, white, & blue
- Athletics conference: OSAA Midwestern League 5A-4
- Team name: Lancers
- Website: www.chs.lane.edu

Winston Churchill High School, also known as Churchill High School, is a public high school located in Eugene, Oregon, United States. The school was named after Winston Churchill.

== Academics ==
In 2023, 81.7% of the school's seniors received their high school diploma. Of 279 students, 228 graduated, 34 dropped out, 1 received a modified diploma, and 4 remained in high school for the following academic year.

== Rachel Carson Center ==
The Center for Natural Resources offers another alternative to the traditional high school curriculum. Students enrolled in this program spend a portion of their time at the Rachel Carson Center and the rest of their time at their home high school. The center provides students with experience, knowledge, and skills that relate to the natural environment.

== Sports ==
=== State championships ===
- Football: 1977 (tie)
- Softball: 1980, 1981, 1982, 1983, 1985, 1986, 1987, 1991, 1992, 2016
- Boys Basketball: 1995, 2001
- Boys Tennis: 2007, 2008
- Boys Soccer: 2008
- Boys Track: 2001, 2002
- Girls Track: 1971, 1983, 1987
- Girls Volleyball: 1974
- Cheerleading: 2001, 2003 (co-ed), 2026
- Dance: 2008
- Baseball: 2017
- Boys Swimming: 2020
- Girls Swimming: 2022

== Notable alumni ==
- Margaret Bailes — Olympic gold medalist, 4×100 meters (1968)
- Evan Dunham - retired professional mixed martial artist, competed in the UFC's Lightweight Division
- Jordan Kent — Football player, Seattle Seahawks, St. Louis Rams
- Tim Euhus — Football player, Buffalo Bills, Pittsburgh Steelers, Arizona Cardinals
- Stanley G. Love — Astronaut
- 3 members of the band Kaddisfly (class of 1999)
- Brad Lamm — Author and Interventionist, Founder of Breathe Life Healing Centers
- Terry Lee, former first baseman for the Cincinnati Reds
- Eric A. Stillwell - Producer and writer
- David Vobora — Football player, St. Louis Rams
- Jenny Wade — Actress
- Anthony Wynn - Author and playwright
- Steve Greatwood - Oregon Football Player & Offensive Line Coach

== Student media ==
=== Radio ===
Churchill is one of the local high schools contributing to KRVM (AM) and KRVM (FM), a public access radio station which includes student involvement.

== Child development center ==
Churchill hosts an educational preschool program for children aged 2½ to five years old. The state licensed program also provides an opportunity for the high school students to gain credit and experience working with the children. This program does not appear to exist anymore.

== 2013 Officer Involved Shooting ==
On November 20, 2013, Eugene Police Department Officer Aaron Johns conducted a traffic stop near Winston Churchill High School. The individual being stopped, Christopher Koziatek, fled from the traffic stop on foot onto the campus of the High School whilst armed with a handgun. Officer Johns ordered a lockdown for Churchill High School and nearby Kennedy Middle School before catching up to Koziatek, where a struggle ensued, before Officer Johns shot Koziatek, who was declared deceased on scene.
