= Bethel School District =

Bethel School District may refer to:

- Bethel School District (Oregon)
- Bethel School District (Vermont)
- Bethel School District (Washington)

== See also ==
- Lower Kuskokwim School District - The school district for Bethel, Alaska
