= River Road, Oregon =

- Census-designated place
- Location within Oregon Location within the United States
- Coordinates: 44°04′52″N 123°07′35″W
- Country: United States
- State: Oregon
- County: Lane

Area
  - Total: 1.82 sq mi (4.71 km^{2})
  - Land: 1.82 sq mi (4.71 km^{2})
  - Water: 0 sq mi (0.00 km^{2})
- Elevation: 397 ft (121 m)

Population (2020)
  - Total: 8,732
  - Density: 4,804.8/sq mi (1,855.16/km^{2})
- Time zone: UTC-8 (Pacific (PST))
  - Summer (DST): UTC-7 (PDT)
- ZIP Code: 97404 (Eugene)
- Area codes: 541/458
- FIPS code: 41-62300
- GNIS feature ID: 2812881

River Road is a census-designated place (CDP) and neighborhood in Eugene. Located in Lane County, Oregon, United States. It was first listed as a CDP prior to the 2020 census. As of the 2020 census, River Road had a population of 8,732.

The CDP is in north-central Lane County, on the northwest side of Eugene. It extends from the junction of River Road and the Northwest Expressway in the south to Oregon Route 569, the Randy Papé Beltline, in the north. River Road and the Northwest Expressway form the eastern and western boundaries of the CDP, respectively. Numerous outlying areas belonging to the city of Eugene are scattered throughout the CDP, which is otherwise unincorporated.

== Demographics ==
Historical population
Census	Pop.	Note	%±
2020	8,732		—
U.S. Decennial Census

== Education ==
The River Road CDP is mostly in the Eugene School District, with a portion in Bethel School District 52.

Lane County is in the Lane Community College district.
