= Oregon Route 132 =

State highway in Lane County, Oregon, US

Oregon Route 132
- Delta Highway
- Oregon Route 132 highlighted in red

Route information
- Maintained by ODOT
- Length: 1.6 mi (2.6 km)
- Existed: October 27, 1964–present

Major junctions
- South end: I-105 / OR 126 in Eugene
- North end: OR 569 in Eugene

Location
- Country: United States
- State: Oregon
- Counties: Lane

Highway system
- Oregon Highways; Interstate; US; State; Named; Scenic
← OR 131	→ OR 138

Oregon Route 132 (OR 132), also known as Delta Highway is a short limited-access freeway in Eugene, Oregon, United States, linking downtown Eugene with Beltline Highway.

== Route description ==
OR 132 begins at an interchange with Interstate 105 (I-105) and OR 126 on the north bank of the Willamette River, opposite Downtown Eugene. It travels north and intersects Valley River Drive, which serves the Valley River Center and a nearby retail district that includes several car dealerships. The highway crosses under a cable-stayed pedestrian bridge and travels northeast through the Delta Ponds, a wetland area and city park surrounded by housing. OR 132 intersects Goodpasture Island Road and continues north to an interchange with the Randy Papé Beltline Highway (OR 569), which encircles the north and west of Eugene and provides connections to I-5. The freeway ends at the Randy Papé Beltline Highway, but the road continues as a two-lane surface street named North Delta Road.

== History ==
OR 132 opened on October 27, 1964 as Delta Highway and is named for the nearby McKenzie-Willamette delta. The lowest construction bid for the project, submitted by the R. A. Heintz Company, was withdrawn due to an accounting error, resulting in a dispute between the county government and the contractor, who was later awarded the bid in a second round.

Under a 2017 bill passed by the state legislature, the Oregon Transportation Commission negotiated a jurisdictional transfer with Lane County for the Delta Highway that was finalized in 2019. On January 23, 2020, the commission approved the designation of OR 132 for the corridor. The transfer was planned ahead of state-funded improvements to the highway's northern interchange at OR 569.

== Exit list ==
The entire route is in Eugene, Lane County. All exits are unnumbered.

mi	km	Destinations	Notes
0.0	0.0	I-105 / OR 126 to I-5 / OR 99 – Downtown Eugene, Fairgrounds, Springfield	Southern terminus
0.4	0.64	Willagillespie Road – Valley River Center	
1.3	2.1	Goodpasture Island Road	
1.6	2.6	OR 569 (Randy Papé Beltline) to I-5 – Eugene Airport	Northern terminus
1.000 mi = 1.609 km; 1.000 km = 0.621 mi
