= KAVE =

Simulcast of KRVM-FM
- Oakridge, Oregon; United States
- Frequency: 88.5 MHz

Programming
- Format: Variety

Ownership
- Owner: Eugene School District 4J; (Lane County School District No. 4J)

History
- First air date: February 23, 2004 (as KMKR)
- Former call signs: KMKR (2004–2006)

Technical information
- Licensing authority: FCC
- Facility ID: 132574
- Class: A
- ERP: 400 watts
- HAAT: −392 meters (−1,286 ft)
- Transmitter coordinates: 43°44′26.4″N 122°26′54.1″W

Links
- Public license information: Public file; LMS
- Webcast: Listen Live
- Website: krvm.org

KAVE (88.5 FM) is a radio station rebroadcasting the variety format of KRVM-FM in Eugene, Oregon, serving the community of Oakridge, Oregon, United States. The station is owned and licensed by Lane County School District 4J.

== History ==
The station went on the air as KMKR on February 23, 2004. On November 15, 2006, the station changed its call sign to KAVE.
