= Fern Ridge-Tribune News =

Newspaper published in Junction City, Oregon

- Type: Weekly newspaper
- Format: Broadsheet
- Founder: Archie Root
- Publisher: Pam Petersdorf
- Founded: 1961 (as West Lane News)
- Language: English
- Ceased publication: 2022
- Headquarters: 225 W 6th St; Junction City, OR 97448; United States
- OCLC number: 727067833
- Website: Website

The Fern Ridge-Tribune News was a weekly newspaper published in Junction City, Oregon, United States on Wednesdays. The paper served Junction City and the tri-county area of Benton, Linn, and Lane counties, including the communities of Monroe, Harrisburg, and Santa Clara. It was founded in 1961 as the West Lane News and ceased in 2022.

== History ==
In 1961, Archie Root started the West Lane News in Lane County, Oregon. The paper was edited in Eugene, printed in Florence and published in Veneta. Previously Root worked as a rug salesman until he bought a $25 mimeograph machine, quit his job and then started publishing the newspaper. After three issues he met Anant Chavan, a 25-year-old graduate student from India who was pursuing a master's degree in journalism at the University of Oregon. Root made a deal with Chavan to work as the paper's editor in exchange for free room and board. After a year the paper had 700 paying subscribers. At that time Chavan was engaged to Root's daughter.

In 1972, Archie and Esther Root sold the News to Duncan and Jane McDonald, but the paper's founder continued to write his weekly column "Archie Dear." In 1976, the McDonalds sold the paper to Joe and Louise Cannon. A year later the couple launched the Tri-County News in Junction City.

In 1996, former Chicago Tribune reporter Ed Hawley bought the two papers, and the Benton Bulletin in Philomath, which he later closed in May 1998 after 22 years in business. At the time it was losing $4,000 a month. Hawley was arrested in September 1999 and charged with a felony for sexually abusing a 17-year-old boy. Hawley pled guilty in March. A month later a fire damaged the newspaper's office. The fire's cause was arson. Hawley was sentenced to 5 years in prison. His brother and the former owner Joe Cannon kept the paper going until a buyer was found.

In the wake of the scandal, advertisers dropped and circulation declined. Thousands of dollars' worth of equipment including printers, computers, records was lost in the fire. At the time the paper had a dozen employees and a 4,000 circulation. By July 1999, the paper was sold to Mike and Sandy Thoele. Mike Thoele was a former reporter at The Register-Guard and author of "Fire Line: Summer Battles of the West." Mike and Sandy Thoele published the West Lane News and Tri-County News for nine years. Shortly after buying the paper, the couple were given a kitten which they named Scoop and let live in their office as the paper's mascot.

Andrew Polin bought both papers from the couple in April 2008, but closed them in December 2009 due to financial woes. To replace them, two different owners launched The Tribune News in Junction City and the Fern Ridge Review in Veneta. The two titles were purchased in 2013 by Pam Petersdorf, who previously worked for years at the West Lane News starting in 1972. She merged the papers in July 2021 to form the Fern Ridge-Tribune News. The publication was suspended following Petersdorf's death on Nov. 14, 2022.
