= Kameron Canaday =

American football player (born 1993)

No. 86, 57
- Position: Long snapper

Personal information
- Born: August 20, 1993 (age 33); Eugene, Oregon, U.S.
- Listed height: 6 ft 4 in (1.93 m)
- Listed weight: 245 lb (111 kg)

Career information
- High school: Sheldon (Eugene)
- College: Portland State (2012–2015)
- NFL draft: 2016: undrafted

Career history
- Arizona Cardinals (2016); Pittsburgh Steelers (2017–2020); Chicago Bears (2022)*
- * Offseason or practice squad member only

Awards and highlights
- Third-team All-American (2015)

Career NFL statistics
- Games played: 67
- Stats at Pro Football Reference

Kameron Canaday (born August 20, 1993) is an American former professional football player who was a long snapper for the Arizona Cardinals and Pittsburgh Steelers of the National Football League (NFL). He played college football for the Portland State Vikings and signed with the Cardinals as an undrafted free agent in 2016.

== Early life ==
Canaday played high school football at Sheldon High School in Eugene, Oregon, where he was a long snapper and defensive lineman. He earned First-team All-Southwest League honors as a defensive lineman. He was rated one of the best long snappers in the country by Rubio Long Snapping. He helped the team advance to the OSAA Class 6A state championship his senior year in 2011, where they lost to Lake Oswego High School. He was also on the Sheldon High team that won the OSAA Class 6A state championship his sophomore year in 2009. He played basketball in high school as well.

== College career ==
Canaday was a four-year starter at long snapper for the Portland State Vikings of Portland State University from 2012 to 2015. He missed the first five games of his freshman season in 2012 while waiting for the NCAA to declare him eligible. He then started the final six games of the season and recorded one special teams tackle. He played in eleven games, all starts, for the Vikings in 2013 and missed one game due to injury. He appeared in 12 games, all starts, for the team in 2014 and made two special teams tackles. Prior to the 2015 season, he was named a preseason First-team All-American by Stats Inc., and was also named to the College Sporting News Preseason Fabulous 50 All-America Team. He played in all 12 games his senior year in 2015 and was named an FCS Third-team All-American. He also had a fumble recovery on a muffed punt in 2015. Canaday played in 41 games during his college career.

== Professional career ==
Pre-draft measurables
Height	Weight	40-yard dash	10-yard split	20-yard split	20-yard shuttle	Vertical jump	Broad jump	Bench press
6 ft 4 in (1.93 m)	237 lb (108 kg)	5.16 s	1.83 s	2.91 s	4.63 s	33 in (0.84 m)	9 ft 5 in (2.87 m)	12 reps
All values from Portland State Pro Day

=== Arizona Cardinals ===
Canaday signed with the Arizona Cardinals on May 2, 2016 after going undrafted in the 2016 NFL draft. He won the Cardinals' long snapper job after a competition with fellow rookie Danny Dillon. Canaday played in three games for the team before being released on September 27, 2016. His release came two days after he botched a snap that was returned for a touchdown in a game against the Buffalo Bills. He also had a low snap on a potential game-tying field goal with under a minute to play in the Cardinals 23–21 loss in Week 1 to the New England Patriots.

=== Pittsburgh Steelers ===
On February 21, 2017, Canaday was signed by the Pittsburgh Steelers. He was released by the Steelers on May 5, 2017. He was re-signed on May 30, 2017. He was brought in to compete with rookie Colin Holba for the vacant long snapper position that was held by Greg Warren for 11 seasons. Canaday was named the Steelers' long snapper to begin the regular season.

On March 18, 2020, Canaday re-signed with the Steelers on a two-year contract.

On August 31, 2021, Canady was released after losing the starting job to Christian Kuntz.

=== Chicago Bears ===
On January 3, 2023, Canaday was signed to the practice squad of the Chicago Bears.

== Personal life ==
Canaday's father played college football at Western Oregon as a long snapper and defensive lineman.
