= Kalapuya High School =

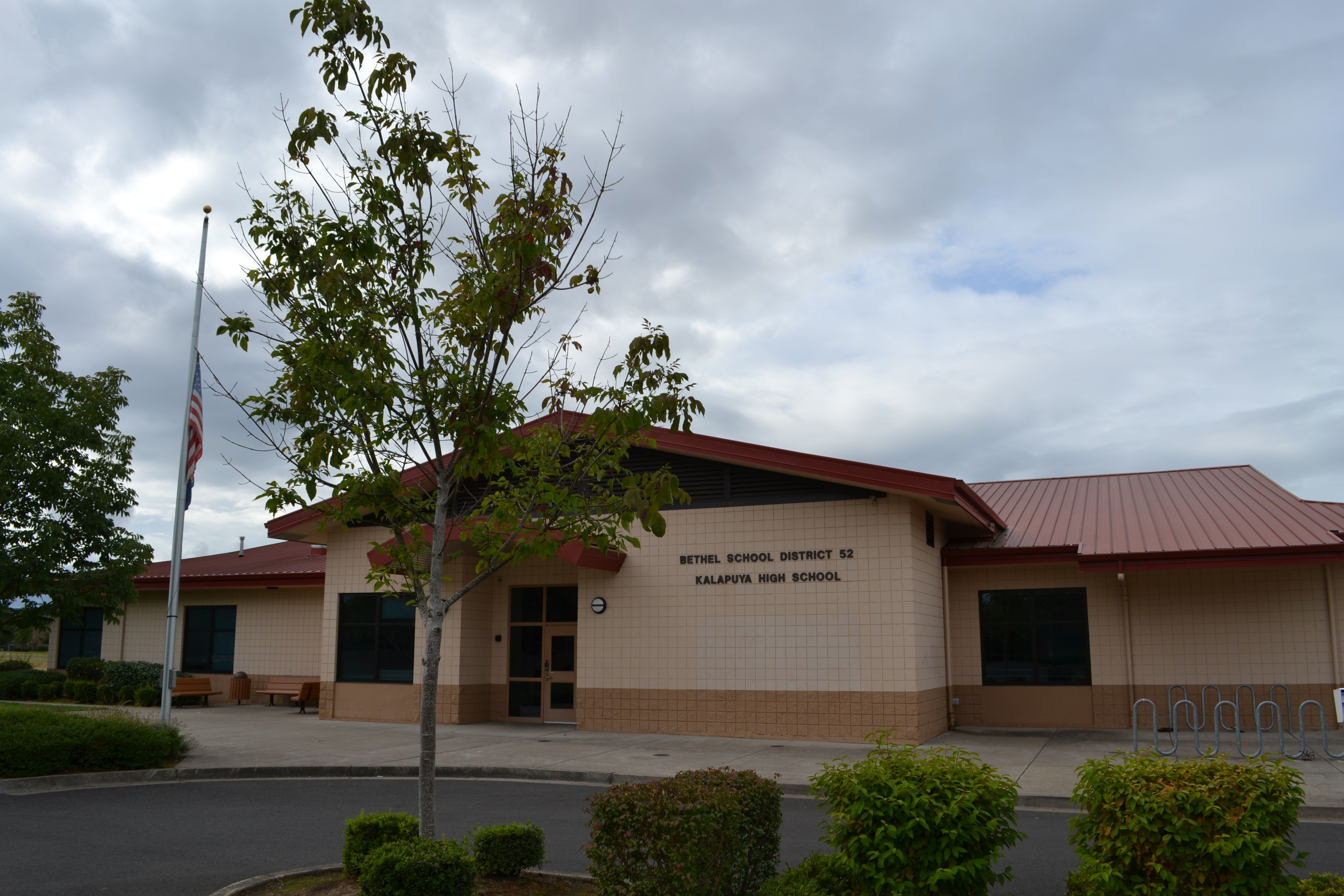

Location
- 1200 N Terry Street; Eugene, (Lane County), Oregon 97402; United States; 44.071155°N 123.190298°W

Information
- Type: Public alternative
- Opened: 2003
- School district: Bethel School District
- Principal: Stefan Aumack
- Teaching staff: 8.00 (FTE)
- Grades: 10-12
- Enrollment: 102 (2023-2024)
- Student to teacher ratio: 12.75
- Website: Kalapuya High School

Kalapuya High School is a public high school in Eugene, Oregon, United States. It was established in an innovative model to provide an alternative to students who were not succeeding in a traditional high school environment, usually drawing from Willamette High School.

== History ==
Kalapuya opened in the fall of 2002. It serves grades 10-12 and operates in one large room, allowing the staff to observe all the students who are grouped into cohorts. Kalapuya was opened at the same time and on shared land with Prairie Mountain School, a K-8 school in the Bethel School District. KHS has had two principals: Fred Crisman 2002–2011, and Stefan Aumack 2011–present.

== Academics ==
Students typically arrive at Kalapuya severely credit deficient, having not been successful in a traditional high school setting. Some students had completely dropped out before enrolling at Kalapuya. But the small cohorts and individualized attention, engaging programs, required professional internships and college credit courses, and devoted staff have helped more KHS students graduate with a high school diploma. In 2008, 4% of the school's seniors received a high school diploma. By 2016, the graduation rate among students with four years of high school had jumped to 32%, a remarkable figure given students' challenging academic standing upon entering KHS and the fact that Kalapuya does not hand out cheap or giveaway credits. The five-year completion rate had climbed to 65% by 2016.

== Bethel Farm ==
Principal Stefan Aumack proposed the development of the Bethel Farm on open and unused land between Kalapuya and Prairie Mountain School. With district support, generous donations, and grant funding the Farm broke ground in spring 2016. It now features a barn with rooftop solar panels, hoop house, instructional raised garden beds, demonstration solar panels, a composting area, and is run by a Farm Manager. In partnership with the Eugene Water and Electric Board, the Farm is also an emergency water station site. Taking advantage of the Farm's existing well, EWEB has installed a larger pump that will be supplemented with a back-up generator in case of an electric outage. The site will be able to deliver water to the Bethel community during an emergency.

== See also ==
- Kalapuya people
