= Oregon Route 569 =

State highway in Lane County, Oregon, US

Oregon Route 569
- Beltline Highway or Randy Papé Beltline
- Route 569 highlighted in red

Route information
- Maintained by ODOT
- Length: 11.20 mi (18.02 km)
- Existed: 2007–present

Major junctions
- West end: OR 126 in Eugene
- East end: Gateway Street in Springfield

Location
- Country: United States
- State: Oregon
- County: Lane

Highway system
- Oregon Highways; Interstate; US; State; Named; Scenic
← OR 551	→ US 730

Oregon Route 569, also known as the Randy Papé Beltline, is an Oregon state highway serving as an outer quarter-loop in Eugene and Springfield. OR 569 comprises part of the Beltline Highway No. 69 (see Oregon highways and routes). It is 11.2 miles (18.0 km) long and runs east–west. OR 569 is not a complete beltway, though it was originally proposed as such.

In March 2010, the Oregon Transportation Commission voted to rename the highway from Beltline to Randy Papé Beltway, which was met with opposition.

== Route description ==
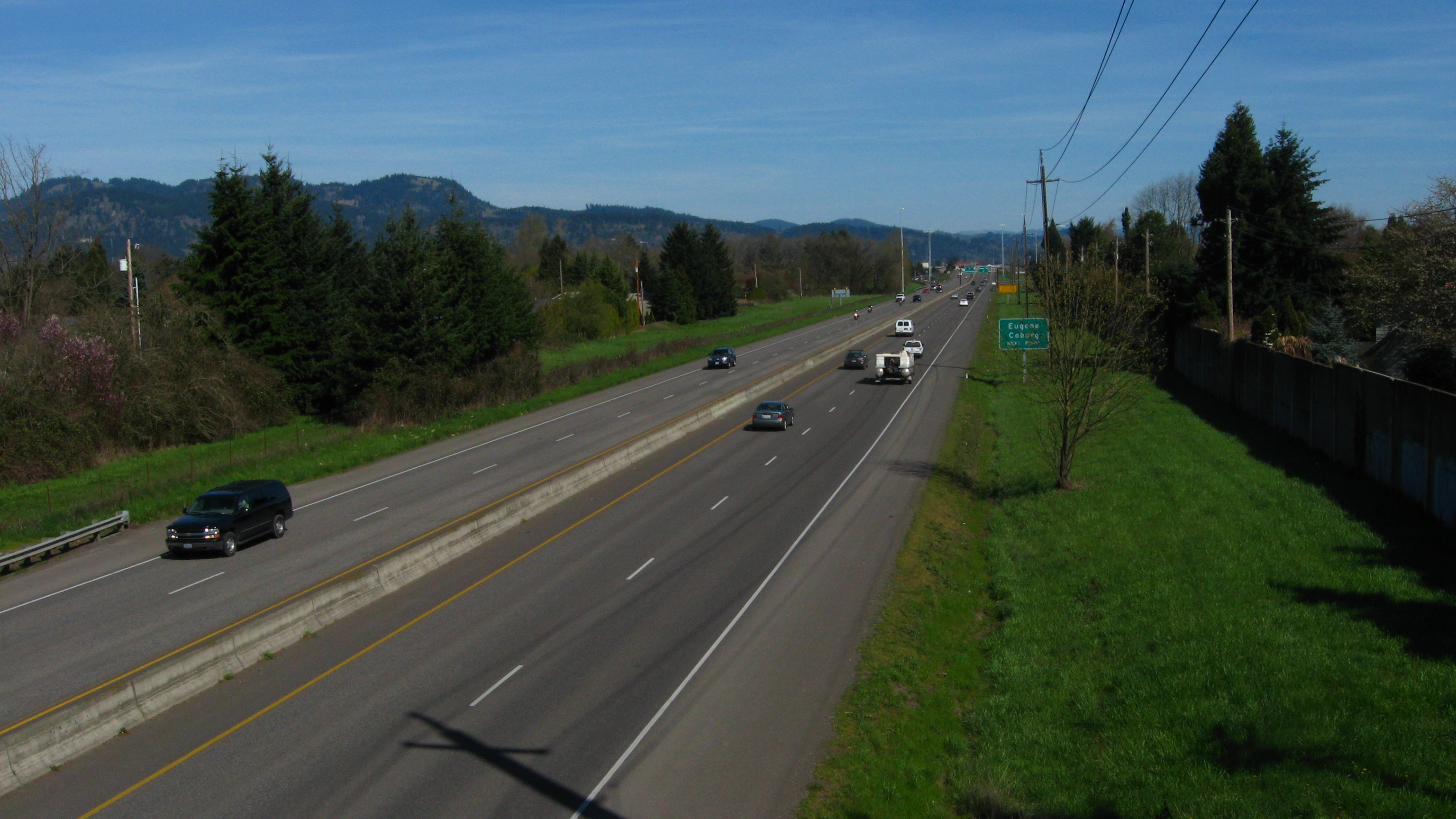
Beltline Highway, looking east, from the Gilham Road overpass

OR 569 begins at a T-intersection with OR 126, on the western edge of Eugene. At first, as it heads north and east, it is an expressway, with one at-grade signalized intersection. Soon it becomes a two-lane freeway in each direction, as it crosses the northern edge of incorporated Eugene. From the highway, one sees mostly suburban housing and strip malls. At the eastern end, there is an interchange with I-5. Beltline becomes a local road at Gateway Street. The roadway continues, eventually reaching OR 528 in Springfield.

One other section of the initial proposal was built. This section is the stretch of 30th Avenue between the Amazon Park neighborhood and Lane Community College—a four-lane expressway which includes two interchanges. This route does not connect directly to the existing stretch of Belt Line Road.

Several enhancements to the Beltline Road have been proposed. The West Eugene Parkway, had it been built, would have intersected Beltline Road at a new interchange. Plans are underway to upgrade the interchange with Oregon Route 132 - Delta Highway. The I-5 interchange was upgraded in 2008. The latter interchange was a full cloverleaf design, and was considered to be both obsolete and dangerous. To upgrade the interchange, a flyover bridge was built, eliminating the northeastern loop ramp and the weaving movements on northbound Interstate 5 and westbound Beltline Road. Construction is underway to redesign the nearby intersection with Gateway Boulevard.

== History ==
The Beltline Highway was constructed by Lane County in 1961 and transferred to state control in 1978 as Highway 69. The highway was assigned the Route 69 designation effective September 19, 2002. However, due to the sexual connotation of the number 69, sign theft would have been an issue, and the Oregon Department of Transportation wanted to sign the route to make navigation easier during the 2008 U.S. Olympic Trials, so ODOT requested that the Oregon Transportation Commission change the number to 14. At their January 25, 2007 meeting, the OTC decided to instead call the highway Route 569, which kept with the pattern used in other cases where the highway number could not be used (usually because there was already a route with that number). Signs for Route 569 were posted by August 2007.

=== Name change ===
In early 2010, Oregon governor Ted Kulongoski requested that Beltline Highway be renamed for local businessman and civic leader Randy Papé. On March 11, the Oregon Transportation Commission approved renaming it to the Randy Papé Beltway. This caused many people to be unsure about decision; there was little chance for any citizen feedback and, if the plan went through, around $250,000 would have been spent on sign changes.

On April 13, 2010, the Lane County Board of Commissioners voted unanimously to request a suspension of any plans to rename the highway. The Oregon Transportation Commission, however, barely budged, and, on April 21, settled on the name Randy Pape Beltline. Initially, to save money, only two signs, one at each end of the route, would be changed. Other signs would be replaced as they wear out.

Opponents argued that while this proposal looked like a great deal on the surface, emails obtained from ODOT through public records request show that the renaming of the highway adds extra letters to the signs, which translates into larger signs and possibly larger supports. ODOT estimated that, instead of the original cost of $250,000 to replace the 53 signs, the new estimate could reach over $500,000. Opponents sought to reverse the name change and had a bit more than 1000 signatures by placing a measure on the November 2010 ballot that would require statewide voter approval to rename state-owned property but fell more than 80,000 signatures short, having had only a few days to collect them.

== Exit list ==
The entire route is in Lane County.

Location	mi	km	Exit	Destinations	Notes
Eugene	3.10	4.99	3	OR 126 (West 11th Avenue) – Eugene, Veneta	Future interchange; at-grade intersection
Eugene	4.24	6.82	4	Roosevelt Boulevard	Future interchange; at-grade intersection
Eugene	5.62	9.04	5	Barger Drive	
Eugene	6.58	10.59	6	OR 99 – Eugene Airport, Junction City	
Eugene	6.83	10.99	7A	Prairie Road	Westbound exit and eastbound entrance
Eugene	7.09	11.41	7	Northwest Expressway	Signed as exit 7B westbound
Eugene	8.47	13.63	8	River Road – Santa Clara	
Eugene	9.56	15.39	9	River Avenue, Division Avenue	Both roads are accessible through their respective exits. Signed as River Ave. (eastbound) and Division Ave. (westbound)
Eugene	10.05	16.17	10	OR 132 / Delta Hwy. – Valley River Center, Green Acres Rd.	
Eugene	11.66	18.76	12	Coburg Road, Eugene	
Eugene	12.77– 12.78	20.55– 20.57	13	I-5 – Roseburg, Portland	Signed as exits 13A (south) and 13B (north) westbound and 13 eastbound
Springfield	13.00	20.92		Gateway Street, Downtown Springfield	At-grade intersection
1.000 mi = 1.609 km; 1.000 km = 0.621 mi: Incomplete access
