= Jordan Kent =

American football player (born 1984)

No. 82, 87
- Position: Wide receiver

Personal information
- Born: July 24, 1984 (age 42); Dhahran, Saudi Arabia
- Listed height: 6 ft 4 in (1.93 m)
- Listed weight: 219 lb (99 kg)

Career information
- High school: Winston Churchill (Eugene, Oregon, U.S.)
- College: Oregon
- NFL draft: 2007: 6th round, 210th overall pick

Career history
- Seattle Seahawks (2007–2008); St. Louis Rams (2009)

Career NFL statistics
- Receptions: 1
- Receiving yards: 5
- Stats at Pro Football Reference

Jordan Russell Kent (born July 24, 1984) is an American sports broadcaster for CBS Sports Network where he calls play-by-play for college basketball, football, NBA and WNBA. Jordan is a former American football wide receiver, television play-by-play announcer for the Golden State Valkyries on KPIX (also KPYX) and former television play-by-play announcer for the Portland Trail Blazers on NBC Sports Northwest. Jordan is the executive producer for Talkin' Ducks, on networks throughout Oregon. During the 2020 NBA Bubble, Jordan called Blazer games on the heels of the resignation of Kevin Calabro. Jordan frequently works with Nintendo of America covering high level gaming tournaments which have been featured on TNT and the Disney channel. Jordan was drafted by the Seattle Seahawks in the sixth round of the 2007 NFL draft after he began playing football when he was a junior in college at the University of Oregon. While at the University of Oregon, Jordan also played Basketball and ran Track, making him the first three-sport college athlete at the University of Oregon since World War II. Since 2012, Jordan has operated award-winning youth sport camps throughout Oregon and Washington called Jordan Kent's Just Kids Skill Camps.

== Early life ==
Kent was born in Saudi Arabia where his dad was coaching basketball. He spent childhood in California and Colorado. He attended Winston Churchill High School in Eugene, Oregon when his dad took the head coaching job at University of Oregon. Kent was an 11-time individual and team state champion in basketball and track. He contributed to state team titles in both sports as a junior before repeating track crown his final year. During his senior season, the First-team All-state pick averaged 18 points on the hardwood while leading Lancers to a 20–4 record.

In 2001, he bettered the 41-year-old state meet long jump record of 24 ft 1 1/4 in (7.347 m) held by Mel Renfro with a leap of 25 ft 1 1/4 in (7.652 m).

In 2002, he became the state's first four-event individual champion in the same year by winning state 4A track and field titles in the long jump (24 ft ½ in), 100 meters (10.54 s), 200 meters (21.29 s), and 400 meters (47.22 s). The two-time state track athlete of the year completed his prep career winning three state 400 championships and two 200 and long jump gold medals, setting state records in each of the latter two events.

== College career ==
Kent was a member of the Oregon Ducks football team in college, and also played basketball and ran track. Jordan did not begin playing football until he tried out for the team during his junior year of college. He was also NCAA's first three-sport athlete since 2001–02 and was the first three-sport letterman at Oregon since World War II and was the Pac-10’s first three-sport letterman. As a member of the Oregon Basketball team Kent won defensive player of the year. Then in 2005 he joined the Oregon Football team, this was his first time ever playing football on a team.

Was a valuable performer on Oregon’s basketball and track teams before joining the football squad in 2005. He earned All-American honors in track, All-Pac-10 Conference academic accolades in basketball. In 2006, he started 12 of 13 games at flanker, ranking second on the team with 44 receptions for 491 yards (11.2 avg.) and four touchdowns.

As a four-time track All-American, Kent was the 2003 200-meter NCAA West Regional winner (20.99). Ran the opening leg on school’s 2005 third-place NCAA 4 x 400 relay and anchored school-record 4 x 100 relay (39.20) that placed sixth. He anchored the 4 x 100 relay to its first Pac-10 title ever in the event in 2006. He owns collegiate bests of 10.41 (100), 20.82 (200), 46.95 (400) and 24 ft 9 3/4 in (7.563 m) (long jump).

In basketball, in 2005–06, after spending most of the fall with the football team, appeared in 25 games, starting 15. Averaged 3.0 points per game and was third on the squad in rebounding at 4.4 per game. In the 2004–05 season he played in all 27 games, starting the final nine. Was third on the team in rebounding (4.4 rpg) and seventh in scoring (4.8 ppg) and earned Second-team Pac-10 All-academic honors. For the 2003–04 season he was a terrific asset on defense, particularly in the full court press. Also showed break away speed in the transition game. Played in 29 games and averaged 1.8 points and 1.2 rebounds per contest. He reshirted for the 2002–03 season.

College Football Statistics

Year	Team	G	GS	Rec	Yards	AVG	TD
2005	ORE	3	3	3	144	38.0	1
2006	ORE	12	12	44	491	11.2	4
Tot.		15	15	47	605	16.6	5

== Professional career ==
=== Pre-draft ===
An injury kept Kent from working out at the NFL Combine. Seattle checked him out late and drafted him for his rare combination of size and speed, being 6 ft 4 1/8 in (1.934 m) and 217 lb (98 kg). In his campus workout Kent ran a 4.43 40-yard dash and 4.04 in the 20-yard shuttle, He posted a 34-inch (860 mm) vertical jump and a 235 lb (107 kg) bench press.

=== Seattle Seahawks ===
Kent had been on the Seattle Seahawks practice squad since he was drafted in 2007. On August 8, 2008, he caught an 18-yard touchdown pass during a preseason game against the Minnesota Vikings. He was signed on to the active roster on October 7, 2008. He has since played on special teams and lined up as a receiver against Miami in week 10. On September 5, 2009, he was released by the Seahawks during the final 53-man roster cuts.

=== St. Louis Rams ===
Kent signed with the St. Louis Rams on November 17, 2009, and made his first and only professional reception, a five-yard gain, on January 3, 2010, against the San Francisco 49ers. He was then cut on September 3, 2010.

== Personal life ==
Jordan is the son of former Oregon basketball player and head coach Ernie Kent, who formerly coached at Washington State University and better known for his tenure at University of Oregon. He is also an avid golfer. Jordan is open about his Christian beliefs. Jordan is a business owner, broadcaster, and entrepreneur. He is also passionate about health and wellness. During the summer months, he runs youth summer camps that teach children sport, nutrition, and character fundamentals through the state of Oregon and across the United States. As of 2021, over 20,000 kids have attended his camps. On Valentine's Day 2015, Kent asked longtime girlfriend Tiffany to marry him. Kent splits his time between Atlanta, Georgia and Oregon during the summer. Jordan served on the Board for Doernbecher Foundation at OHSU in Portland. Kent is the father to four boys.
