= Irving, Eugene, Oregon =

Unincorporated Community in Lane County, Oregon

Coordinates: 44°06′48″N 123°09′54″W

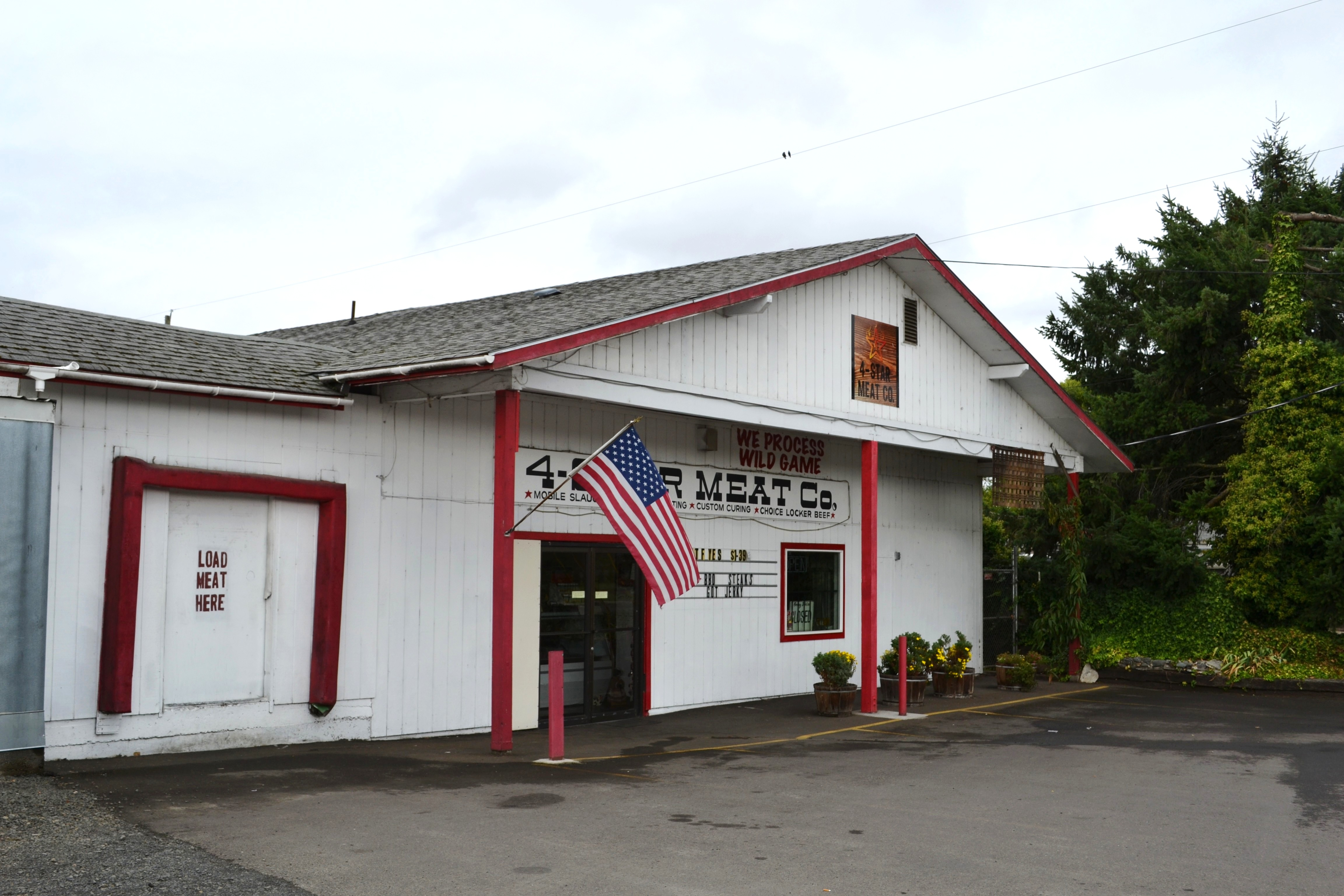
A business in Irving

Irving was an unincorporated community in Lane County, Oregon, United States, and now partly within the Eugene city limits.

== History ==
Irving was a station on the Southern Pacific Railroad's Valley Line between Eugene and Junction City, first named "Halletts" when the line was built in 1872. J. L. Hallett had built the first 100 miles (160 km) of the line and supervised the construction of the rest of the line to Roseburg. In 1876, the name of the station was changed to Irving, probably for William Irving, who was a settler in the area. "Irvine" post office was established in January of the same year, and the name corrected to Irving in October; the post office ran until 1919.

Irving Christian Church (now known as the Sonrise Christian Church) was moved from the Clear Lake area, two miles east of Fern Ridge Reservoir, in 1899. Irving Elementary School is served by the Bethel School District.

== See also ==
- Santa Clara, Eugene, Oregon
