= Tim Euhus =

American football player (born 1980)

No. 87, 84
- Position: Tight end

Personal information
- Born: October 2, 1980 (age 46); Eugene, Oregon, U.S.
- Listed height: 6 ft 5 in (1.96 m)
- Listed weight: 256 lb (116 kg)

Career information
- High school: Churchill (Eugene)
- College: Oregon State (2000-2003)
- NFL draft: 2004: 4th round, 109th overall pick

Career history
- Buffalo Bills (2004–2005); New Orleans Saints (2006)*; Pittsburgh Steelers (2006); Arizona Cardinals (2007)
- * Offseason or practice squad member only

Awards and highlights
- First-team All-Pac-10 (2003)

Career NFL statistics
- Receptions: 14
- Receiving yards: 115
- Receiving touchdowns: 2
- Stats at Pro Football Reference

Timothy James Euhus (born October 2, 1980) is an American former professional football player who was a tight end in the National Football League (NFL). He was selected by the Buffalo Bills in the fourth round of the 2004 NFL draft. He played college football for the Oregon State Beavers.

== College career ==
Euhus attended Oregon State University, lettering in football all of his four years, and graduating with a degree in Construction Engineering Management. He finished his career with 98 receptions for 1,346 yards (13.7 yards per rec. avg.) and nine touchdowns. He was also on the OSU basketball team as a freshman.

In 2003, he was a first-team All Pac-10 selection.

== Professional career ==
Euhus was selected in the fourth round of the 2004 NFL draft by the Buffalo Bills with the 109th overall pick. During his rookie season, he started in five games, recording 11 receptions for 98 yards and two touchdowns. In 2005 he appeared in 11 games recording 3 receptions for 17 yards.

He was traded to the Saints on June 6, 2006. Euhus was waived by the Saints (August 28, 2006) and claimed on waivers by the Pittsburgh Steelers (August 29, 2006). He was waived by the Steelers (October 10, 2006). They re-signed him to a one-year deal in the offseason (February 15, 2007). On May 4, 2007, they released him. On May 29, 2007, he signed with the Cardinals and was later cut on November 27, 2007. He was picked up two weeks later and finished his career with the Cardinals.

For a while, Euhus was a graduate assistant coach at Oregon State as of spring, 2008. Most recently, he has joined a local investment firm as a financial advisor.
