= Sheldon High School (Oregon) =

Public school in Eugene, Oregon, United States

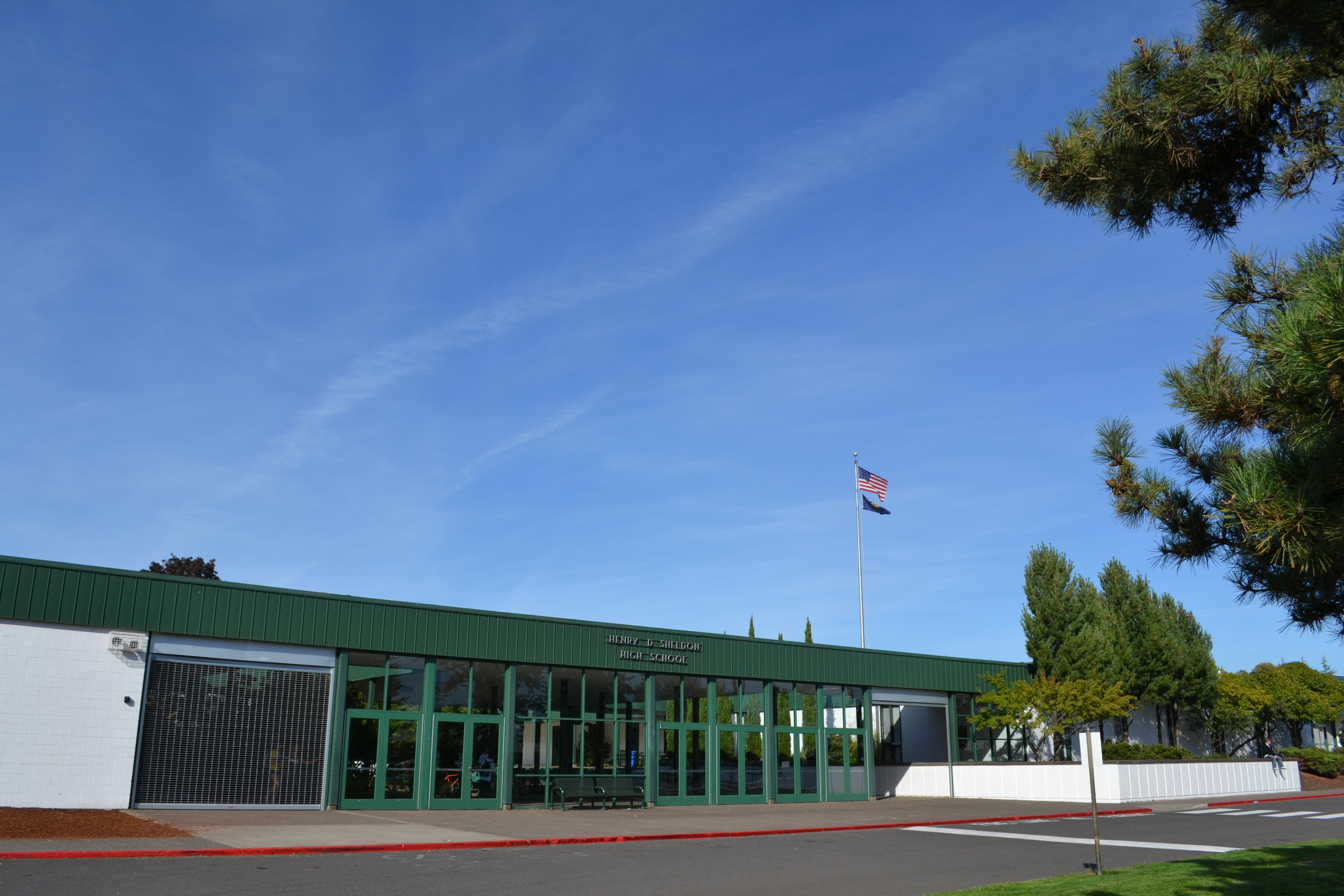

Location
- 2455 Willakenzie Road; Eugene, (Lane County), Oregon 97401; United States; 44.0820828°N 123.0719105°W

Information
- Type: Public
- School district: Eugene School District
- Principal: Mike Ingman
- Teaching staff: 72.54 (FTE)
- Grades: 9-12
- Enrollment: 1,521 (2023–2024)
- Student to teacher ratio: 20.97
- Colors: Green, white and navy
- Athletics conference: OSAA 6A-7 Southwest Conference
- Mascot: Fighting Irishman
- Nickname: Irish
- Rival: South Eugene High School
- Newspaper: The Talisman
- Website: Official website

Henry D. Sheldon High School (or simply just Sheldon High School) is a public high school in Eugene, Oregon, United States. Sheldon is one of four traditional high schools in the Eugene School District.

== Academics ==
In 2022, 87% of the school's seniors received a High School Diploma. Of 322 students, 288 graduated and 34 dropped out, received a modified diploma, or were still in school the following school year.

Sheldon High School offers nine Advanced Placement (AP) classes and opportunities for college credit through Lane Community College and the University of Oregon.

=== Academic awards ===
In June 2010, KGW and The Register-Guard reported that Sheldon had made Newsweek's annual list of the nation's best public high schools of the year, ranking second best in Oregon and 665th in the nation.

== Athletics ==
Sheldon High School athletic teams compete in the OSAA 6A-7 Southwest Conference (excluding football which competes in 6A-SD1). The athletic director is Ricky Rodriguez and the athletics secretary is Kristi Savage.

State Championships:

- Baseball: 2013, 2015
- Boys Basketball: 1992
- Boys Golf: 2005, 2006
- Coolest Student: 2026
- Boys Soccer: 2002†
- Boys Swimming: 1975, 1986, 1987, 1988, 1991, 1993, 1996, 1999
- Boys Track and Field: 2009, 2016, 2024
- Boys Tennis: 1971†, 1972†, 2001
- Cheerleading: 2004
- Dance/Drill: 2002, 2008, 2009, 2017, 2023 (6A Jazz), 2023 (Kick)
- Football: 2002, 2007, 2009, 2012
- Girls Golf: 2013
- Girls Soccer: 2003, 2004
- Girls Swimming: 1997, 1998, 2000
- Girls Track and Field: 1968
- Girls Tennis: 1993
- Softball: 2019, 2023, 2024
- Volleyball: 2022

=== Athletic awards ===
Sheldon High School won the Oregonian Cup, an OSAA award for "overall school excellence in academics, activities, athletics and sportsmanship," in the 2001-2002 and 2002–2003 school years.

== Student media ==
=== Newspaper ===
''The Talisman'' is the student newspaper. It is published twice per term. It was given the Columbia Scholastic Press Association's Silver Crown Award for high school newspapers in 1988.

=== Radio ===
Sheldon is home to KRVM (AM) and KRVM (FM), a public access radio station which includes student involvement.

== Notable alumni ==
- Jon Anderson - 1972 Summer Olympics runner, winner of 1973 Boston Marathon
- Alex Brink - quarterback, Houston Texans, Canadian Football League
- Greg Byrne - Athletic Director for the University of Alabama
- Kameron Canaday - NFL player
- Todd Christensen - football player, Los Angeles Raiders
- James Dutton (astronaut) - NASA astronaut pilot
- Justin Herbert - NFL quarterback for the Los Angeles Chargers and former President of the Sheldon High School Fishing Club
- Dave Hunt - House Speaker, Oregon House of Representatives
- Jon Jaqua - football player, Washington Redskins
- Mike Luckovich - editorial cartoonist for The Atlanta Journal-Constitution
- Chris Miller - football player, Atlanta Falcons
- Brent Primus - former Bellator MMA Lightweight Champion
- Brock Thomas – college football quarterback for the Oregon Ducks
- Michael Walter - football player, San Francisco 49ers
- Craig Wasson - actor
- Taylor John Williams - singer on Season 7 of The Voice
