= Randy Papé =

American business executive and philanthropist (1950–2008)

- Born: May 20, 1950. Eugene, Oregon
- Died: November 6, 2008 (aged 58); Eugene, Oregon
- Education: B.S., University of Oregon, 1972
- Occupations: The Papé Group Inc., founder and president; Liberty Financial Group, co-founder
- Board member of: University of Oregon Foundation; Nature Conservancy of Oregon; Oregon Trail Council of Boy Scouts of America; Mount Bachelor, Inc.
- Spouse: Susan (née Yancy) Papé

Randall Charles "Randy" Papé (May 20, 1950 – November 6, 2008) was a business executive and philanthropist from Eugene, Oregon, in the United States. He was the founder and president of The Papé Group Inc., a co-founder of Liberty Financial Group, a member of the Oregon Transportation Commission, a trustee of the University of Oregon Foundation, and a member of the boards of the Nature Conservancy of Oregon, the Oregon Trail Council of Boy Scouts of America, and Mount Bachelor, Inc.

== Early life and education ==
Papé was the son of Harry Dean Papé and Shirley Olive (née Nyman) Papé.

On the South Eugene High School ski team that won state championships in 1965 and 1967, Papé trained with teammates in Eugene's Civic Stadium, running up the stadium steps and jumping down as if skiing moguls.

Papé earned a baccalaureate degree in business and finance in 1972 at the University of Oregon. He married Susan Yancey in 1974, and the couple had two sons and six grandchildren.

== Career ==
=== Papé Group, Inc. ===
Randy Papé managed Papé Bros., a heavy equipment business that expanded into construction, agriculture and forestry, aviation, banking, garbage hauling, and recycling. According to Oregon State University's Business Matters, "Through Randy Papé's leadership, the company grew to include flightcraft and forklift dealerships and further investment in the construction, forestry, trucking, warehouse and trenching industries." It became Papé Group, with 2,000 employees in seven western states. Bloomberg reports that Papé Group "provides capital equipment rentals, repair and part replacement services to construction, forestry, agriculture, warehousing, business aviation, material handling, and trucking industries. Papé Group serves customers in the State of Oregon." In 2024, the Better Business Bureau recorded Papé Group, Inc.'s 67-year history.

=== Liberty Financial Group ===
The Oregonian reported that Papé was "president, chairman and co-founder of Liberty Financial Group, the parent company of Eugene-based LibertyBank". Liberty Financial Group's "businesses included Commercial Equipment Lease Corp.—a venture started by Papé as a class project at the University of Oregon business school—as well as Liberty Bank and Lane County garbage-hauler SaniPac". Liberty Financial Group was accredited by the Better Business Bureau in January 2010.

=== Non-profit organizations ===
The University of Oregon summarized Papé's non-profit work:

Papé was an active supporter of several nonprofit organizations. He served as a board member of the Nature Conservancy of Oregon and the Oregon Trail Council of Boy Scouts and chaired the United Way of Lane County campaign. He was also a trustee of the University of Oregon Foundation and served as board president in 2000–2001. Papé chaired UO's capital campaign Transforming Lives from 2000–2008... raising $854 million.

==== Mount Bachelor, Inc. ====
While Papé was serving as president and board member of Mount Bachelor, Inc., he opposed buyout of the resort by Powdr. He believed in maintaining local membership, and advocated the "development of year-round recreational experiences, new snowmaking capabilities, and night skiing and lodging". When the board of directors voted to waive a state statute preventing a hostile takeover, Papé Group sued and won a settlement. Since many shareholders had already pledged or sold stock to Powdr, however, by the end of March 2001, Powdr acquired 70% of the stock and ownership of Mount Bachelor ski area.

==== Other causes ====
Both Democratic Sen. Ron Wyden and Republican Sen. Gordon Smith paid tribute to Papé's public service in the Congrssional Record. Sen. Wyden gave "only a partial list of what Randy achieved for my state":

Randy lived in Eugene all his life, but gave himself to the entire State. Growing his grandfather's business from a local equipment sales operation to a seven-State conglomerate was just a part of what he accomplished. During his life he helped raise nearly $600 million for building at his alma mater, the University of Oregon. His tenure on the Oregon Transportation Commission resulted in a $1.3 billion, 10-year program of bridge repair and replacement that remade Interstate 5, the heart of Oregon's transportation system. As head of the United Way of Lane County's fundraising campaign, he set a $1 million goal that everyone thought was impossible and then achieved it. He served on the board of The Nature Conservancy of Oregon, the Oregon Trail Council of the Boy Scouts Of America, as well as other nonprofit organizations such as the Oregon Business Council Steering Committee.

Sen. Smith added to the tribute:

Guiding his business empire was more than a full-time job, yet Randy found time to give his talent and treasure to an endless variety of worthy causes. There was no bigger booster of his alma mater, the University of Oregon, than Randy. There was no better cheerleader and fundraiser for the United Way than Randy. There was no more committed member of the Nature Conservancy of Oregon, and the Oregon Trail Council of Boy Scouts of America than Randy.

== Honors, awards ==
The University of Oregon honored Papé with its highest honor, the Pioneer Award, in 2005. In 2008, United Way named Papé as the recipient of its Alton F. Baker Award (In memoriam). Papé was also honored with the University of Oregon's Randall C. Papé Chair in Entrepreneurship and Innovation, which supports an endowed faculty chair.

=== Randy Papé Beltline ===
At the request of Governor Ted Kulongoski in March 2010, the Oregon Transportation Commission (OTC) voted to rename Highway 569 (Belt Line Road) in Eugene, Oregon, in Randy Papé's honor, including $250,000 for about 50 signs for the change, replacing "Belt Line Road" signs. Local opposition to the change was based primarily on the cost in an economic downturn. The OTC members unanimously approved the name change, with scaled-back up-front costs, to "Randy Papé Beltline" on April 20, 2010.

=== University of Oregon projects ===
Papé Field at the University of Oregon was completed in 2012 for women's soccer and lacrosse teams. The Papé Family Innovation Center has "facilities designed specifically for translating academic research into societal impact—surgical devices, medical therapies, and targeted treatments for disease..." The Center was supported by a $5 million gift from the Papé family.

== See also ==
- Oregon Route 569 name change
