= North Eugene High School =

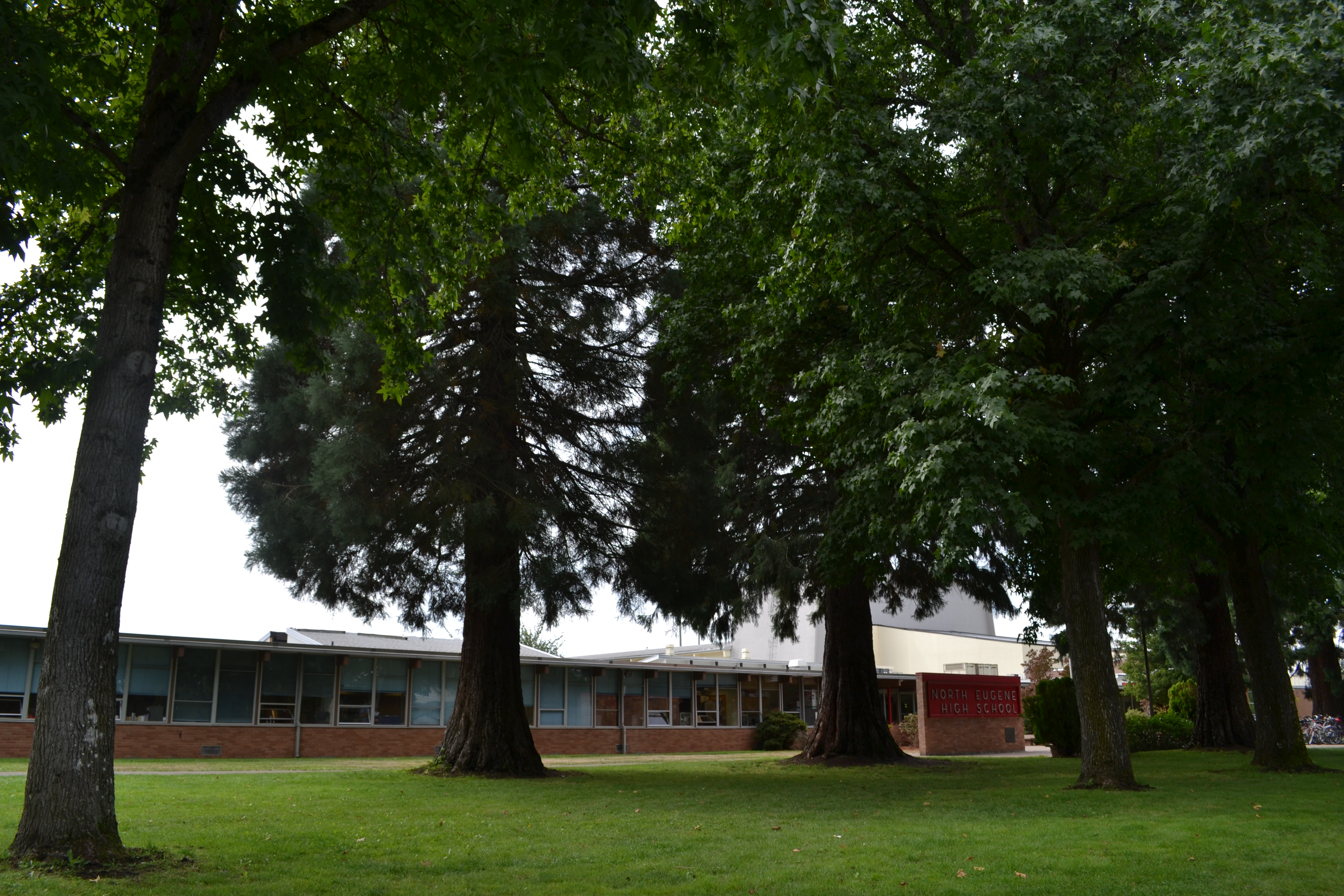

Location
- 250 Silver Lane; Eugene, Lane County, Oregon 97404; United States; 44.09495°N 123.13099°W

Information
- Type: Public
- Opened: 21 October 1957; 69 years ago
- School district: Eugene School District
- Principal: Ricci Huling
- Teaching staff: 49.76 (FTE)
- Grades: 9-12
- Enrollment: 1,071 (2022–23)
- Student to teacher ratio: 20.38
- Colors: Red and white
- Athletics conference: OSAA Midwestern League 5A-2(independent in football until 2016)
- Mascot: Highlander
- Team name: Highlanders
- Newspaper: The Caledonian
- Yearbook: Tartan
- Website: www.nehs.lane.edu

North Eugene High School is a public high school in the River Road/Santa Clara neighborhoods of Eugene, Oregon, United States.

== History ==
North Eugene High School opened to students on October 21, 1957. The opening was delayed nearly two months, causing two months of double-shifting at Kelly Middle School until the school was finally completed.

The current NEHS campus was a filbert orchard belonging to a couple of Scottish ancestry. The couple donated land to Eugene School District 4J for the high school to be built on.

The NEHS mascot, "Scottie", the Scotch Terrier, reflects the school's heritage, as do the names of the school newspaper (Caledonian) and yearbook (Tartan).

In April 2004 NEHS staff, parents, and community members were approached with information about the Oregon Small Schools Initiative project and grant opportunities. In May 2004, a $900,000 grant from the Bill & Melinda Gates Foundation was awarded to NEHS to begin this project. After a series of meetings and workshops, the school transformation officially began.

In the 2006 academic year, 3 small schools were implemented: North International High School, Academy of Arts, and School of IDEAS: Invention, Design, Engineering, Arts, & Science.

As the 2013 academic year commenced, the comprehensive high school model was reintroduced to North Eugene High School.

== Academics ==
In 2008, 84% of the school's seniors received their high school diploma, Of 246 students, 207 graduated, 23 dropped out, 4 received a modified diploma, and 12 remained in high school.

The student-produced school newspaper, The Caledonian, appears to be the first in the area to move to an online news production model.

The students at N.E.H.S. performed at 47%, 68% and 50% proficient in Math, Reading & Science respectively on the Oregon Assessment of Knowledge and Skills. This compares to state averages of 49%, 67% and 56%.

The school in 2016 received a bronze medal ranking from the U.S. News & World Report "America's Best High Schools" survey.

Principal: Main Nunoz

Secondary Assist Principals: Adrienne Pierce, Jesus Sandoval, and Peter Barsotti

== College preparation courses ==
North Eugene High School is an authorized International Baccalaureate World School. All N.E.H.S. students take IB classes in Literature and History in 11th and 12th grade. Students may also choose to enroll in several other International Baccalaureate (IB) and Advanced Placement (AP) courses. The school offers a number of these courses, allowing its students the opportunity to take the cumulative exams in the spring to gain college credit at the high school level. North Eugene usually sees very high passing percentages from its students who take these exams, except on the science exams. Students are also offered CollegeNow courses, which directly give students Lane Community College credits which are often transferable to statewide universities.

Advanced Placement Courses: Statistics A/B and Calculus A/B

International Baccalaureate Courses: Visual Art SL/HL, Language and Literature 11 A/B, Language and Literature 12 A/B, Film Studies A/B, Math Applications and Interpretations A/B, Personal and Professional Skills 11A, Personal and Professional Skills 12B, Biology A/B (I, II), Environmental Systems & Society A/B, History of the Americas HL A/B, 20th Century History HL A/B, Theory of Knowledge (I,II), Global Politics (Not offered 2024/25), and IB Language B (Spanish/Japanese).

CollegeNow Courses: Child Development (I, II, III, Aide), Infant Development, Ethnic Studies, Intro to Education, Woods Processing (I, II, Woods Projects), Metalworking (I, II, Metalworking projects), Management and Operations A/B, Digital Media & Design A/B, Computer Science A/B, Mobile App Development, Game Development, Restaurant Management & Occupations (I, II), Human Body Systems A/B, Medical Terminology, Healthcare Essentials, Writing 121, Math Applications and Interpretations A/B, PreCalculus A/B, Spanish (II, III, IIII, IB), and American Sign Language (IIII).

CollegeNow In Progress Courses: Human Anatomy & Physiology A/B, Health Occupations, and Healthy Foods.

== Sports ==
North Eugene High School has a long list of Sports offered through OSAA. The Highlanders have won the following state team championships:

| Sport | Winter, Spring, or Fall sport? | 1st place in State | 2nd place in State | 3rd place in State |
|---|---|---|---|---|
| Baseball | Spring | 2010 | | |
| Boys' Basketball | Winter | 1963, 1966, 1976, 1977, 2007 | 1974 | 1971 |
| Girls' Basketball | Winter | 1989 | 2009 | |
| Cheer | Winter, Spring, Fall | | | |
| Cross Country | Fall | | 1967, 1972, 1975 | 1970, 1971, 1973 |
| Track and Field | Spring | 1962 | | |
| Dance | Winter, Spring, Fall | | | |
| Football | Fall | | | |
| Boys' Golf | Spring | 1960 | | |
| Girls' Golf | Spring | | | 2024 |
| Boys' Soccer | Fall | | | |
| Girls' Soccer | Fall | | 2017, 2023 | |
| Softball | Spring | 2000 | | |
| Swimming | Winter | | | |
| Boys' Tennis | Spring | | | |
| Girls' Tennis | Spring | | | |
| Volleyball | Fall | | | |
| Wrestling | Winter | | | |

North Eugene has previously offered other sports as well:

Girls' gymnastics - 1st place in state: 1976

== Clubs ==
North Eugene High School offers a variety of student clubs. Students may establish a club provided they find a faculty or staff member to serve as its advisor.

Clubs List - Updated Every 5 Minutes

| Club Name | Active or Inactive? | Affinity Group, Club-Sport or Other? | Descriptions+ |
|---|---|---|---|
| Speech and Debate Club | Active | Other | "This is our first year of speech and debate, so we are just getting our feet wet. But if you're interested, stay tuned for more info, or talk to Samara Cooper, our president!" |
| Asian Student Union | Active | Affinity Group | "ASU is a place to foster shared experiences, connections, and community growth. Members will spend meetings building community, sharing stories, and exploring our identities within our school community as well as the larger community." |
| Caledonian Student Newspaper | Active | Other | "The Caledonian is our school newspaper, written for and by NEHS students. Get interested, get involved!" |
| National Honor Society | Active | Affinity Group | "Sophomores with a 3.5 GPA will be invited to apply. This is a nationally recognized group that celebrates academic achievement and community service." |
| Art Club | Unsure | Other | "Join us in the art room to be creative: draw, paint, work with clay, explore fiber arts, or any other art form that intrigues you. We will also work on community projects. All types of artsists with any level of experience are welcome!" |
| Black Student Union | Active | Affinity Group | "BSU is a safe place for students of color to share stories, provide support for each other academically, socially, and culturally." |
| Drama Club | Active | Unsure | "Travel to the Oregon Shakespeare Festival and talk about all things drama!" |
| Eco Club | Active | Other | "Club to improve the school's environmental and sustanability practices through education. Meets with other ECO groups in the area to take action for climate justice. We run the schools food waste program, Love Food Not Waste." |
| Gender Sexuality Alliance | Active | Affinity Group | "GSA promotes tolerance and acceptance, & to provide a safe, non-judgemental space as a support network for Gay, Lesbian, Bisexual, Transgender, Questioning youth and their allies who share a common vision of social equality." |
| Key Club | Active | Other | "Key Club is a community service organization linked to Kiwanis. It is an excellent way for students to earn service hours and develop leadership skills." |
| Latine Student Union | Active | Affinity Group | "LSU promotes higher education, community engagement, political participation, culture, and history. LSU is open to anyone, and does not exclude membership based on socio-economic status, gender, race, or orientation." |
| Mock Trial | Active | Club-Sport | "Students prepare for the state mock trial competition by serving as lawyers and/or witnesses in the selected legal case for the year." |
| Ukulele All Stars | Active | Other | "We exist to put ukeleles into the hands of teenagers. We promote education through music and public performance. Absolutely no musical experience is needed to join." |
| Orchestra | Inactive | Other | "Orchestra Club offers North students the opportunity to play their string instruments with others. All experience levels are welcome. (Bring your own instrument.)" |
| Native American Student Union | Active | Affinity Group | "Join us to learn about Native American culture and traditions as well as plan educational events for the school." |
| North Eugene Robotics Division | Active | Club-Sport | "NERD students learn to think like engineers. Teams design, build, and code robots to compete in an alliance format against other alliances. Robots are built from a reusable platform, powered by Android technology, and can be coded using a variety of levels of Java-based programming." |
| Women in STEM | Active | Unsure | "Join us to learn more about science-related careers!" |
| Equestrian Team | Active | Club-Sport | "Horseback competitions." |
| Yearbook Club | Active | Other | "Want to help with yearbook but didn't fit it into your schedule? Contribute photos and submit ideas to senior editors at Yearbook Club" |
| Disc Golf | Active | Club-Sport | "Come learn how to play Disc Golf from some Pro Disc Golfers!" |
| Video Game Club | Active | Other | "Interested in video games? Come play a new game every week on Wednesdays." |
| D&D | Active | Other | "Looking for Group? or maybe just a place to show off your cool new character or campaign? Come geek out with us on Thursday to talk about games, and maybe even find yourself a new party."" |
| Jewish Student Union | Active | Affinity Group | "An affinity group for students who identify as Jewish and their allies" |
| Mind Body Divergence Alliance | Active | Affinity Group | N/A |
| Diversity Coding | Active | Other | "Providing a gender-affirming space for female and gender-diverse students and students of color to be supported in learning how to code and learn computer science." |
| Philosophy Club | Active | Other | "Talk a lot? Us too! This is a student lead discussions club open to everyone! The is meant to inspire creative culture and promote critical thinking skills - No philisophical [sic] knoweledge [sic] required." |
| Knitting and Crochet Circle | Active | Other | "Knitting and Crochet happens. All levels welcome." |
| Ultimate Frisbee | Active | Club-Sport | "Learning to play Ultimate Frisbee. All people are welcome!" |
| Unified Leaders | Active | Unsure | "Inclusive Youth Leadership encourages students and staff to take on leading roles to create a socially inclusive environment through sports and other activities." |
| Allies Club | Unsure | Affinity Group | N/A |
| OBOB | Active | Club-Sport | "Students will read and discuss the annual OBOB books in preparation for trivia tournaments in the spring. Join us!" |
| 3D Printing Club | Active | Other | "Create 3D Designs with others who are interested in 3D printing" |
| Chess | Inactive | Other (Planned as Club-Sport though) | N/A |
| Herencia LSU | Active | Affinity Group | "Herencia LSU an affinity group tailored specifically for Newcomers/Spanish speaking students." |

== Notable alumni ==
- Robby Ahlstrom – professional baseball player, Texas Rangers organization
- Danny Ainge — general manager and president of NBA's Boston Celtics, player for Celtics and Portland Trail Blazers, 2-time NBA champion; Major League Baseball player for Toronto Blue Jays
- Brian Conklin — professional basketball player, Limoges CSP
- Andrew Moore — MLB player, Seattle Mariners
- Kenny Moore — (Class of 1962), University of Oregon (1963–66), runner, Olympic marathoner, sportswriter (Sports Illustrated), screenwriter (Without Limits), author (Bowerman and the Men of Oregon), actor in films Personal Best and Tequila Sunrise
- Bob Newland — NFL wide receiver, New Orleans Saints
- Robin Pflugrad — college football coach
- Jerome Souers — football head coach, Northern Arizona University and Montana State-Northern
- Christopher Stevens — four-time Grammy Award-winning producer, mix-engineer, songwriter
- David Ogden Stiers — (Class of 1960), actor in films and on television series M*A*S*H
- Kailee Wong — NFL linebacker, Minnesota Vikings, Houston Texans
