= Bethel School District (Oregon) =

School district in Oregon, United States of America

Location
- 4640 Barger Drive Eugene, Oregon, 97402; United States
- Coordinates: 44°05′03″N 123°10′28″W

District information
- Grades: K-12
- Established: 1948; 77 years ago
- Superintendent: Dr. Kraig Sproles
- NCES District ID: 4102040

Students and staff
- Students: 5,560 (2021)
- Student–teacher ratio: 20.98 (2021)

Other information
- Website: bethel.k12.or.us

Bethel School District (52) is a school district in the U.S. state of Oregon. It serves the Bethel neighborhood in northwest Eugene. During the 2018–19 school year approximately 5,450 students were enrolled in Bethel's 11 schools, making it the third largest school district in Lane County.

Bethel School District was formed in 1948 with the consolidation of the Bethel, Irving, Clear Lake, Danebo, and Malabon school districts. Willamette High School opened in September 1949 with an enrollment of 381. Students in the class of 1950 were WHS's first graduates. Alvadore was the last of six small districts to join Bethel in 1960.

Tom Powers served as the first superintendent from 1948 to 1970. The auditorium at Willamette High School is named in his honor. Ray Klappenbach served from 1970 to 1987. Kent Hunsaker was superintendent from 1987 to 2003. Steve Hull 2003–2005, Tim Keeley 2005–2006, Colt Gill 2006–2016, Chris Parra from 2016 to 2020, and Dr. Kraig Sproles from 2020 to today.

In addition to portions of Eugene, it includes sections of the River Road and Santa Clara census-designated places.

== Bond Measure ==
In November 2012 Bethel voters approved a $49.5 million bond measure with a 73% Yes vote. It did not increase anyone's tax rate. The Bethel bond resulted in the construction of new schools to replace Fairfield Elementary and Malabon Elementary, at the time the oldest elementary schools in the district. With the bond the district also built state of the art science classrooms and a new front office at Willamette, the district's comprehensive high school. The WHS facility was the first LEED certified K-12 public school building in the Willamette Valley. All of the new school buildings opened with ribbon-cutting ceremonies in September 2015. The bond also provided for improved safety and security features at all Bethel schools; updated technology throughout the district; new textbooks; energy efficient windows and HVAC controls; new roofs; replacement carpeting; improved playgrounds; renovated restrooms and locker rooms; updated fire panels; new boilers; modern clock systems; kitchen serving lines; gym bleachers; phone systems; security fencing; school lighting; press box; parking lot resurfacing; ADA improvements; stage curtains and sound system; kitchen appliances, and more.

== Schools ==
=== Elementary schools ===
Bethel's elementary schools serve students in grades Kindergarten-5. Full-day Kindergarten was introduced at every Bethel elementary and K-8 school in September 2015.

- Clear Lake Elementary
- Danebo Elementary
- Fairfield Elementary
- Irving Elementary
- Malabon Elementary

=== K-8 schools ===
Bethel's K-8 schools opened in 1998 (Meadow View) and 2002 (Prairie Mountain). K-5 students are in the elementary wings and grades 6-8 are in the middle school wings.

- Meadow View School
- Prairie Mountain School

=== Middle schools ===
The district's traditional middle schools are home to students in grades 6–8.

- Cascade Middle School
- Shasta Middle School

=== High schools ===
Willamette is Bethel's comprehensive high school. In the 2018–19 school year enrollment was approximately 1,450. Kalapuya opened in 2002 and was designed as an alternative school. Its enrollment is close to 100 students.

- Kalapuya High School
- Willamette High School

== See also ==
- Eugene School District
- Irving, Eugene, Oregon
- Malabon, Oregon
