= How to Beat the High Cost of Living =

1980 film by Robert Scheerer

- Theatrical release poster
- Directed by: Robert Scheerer
- Screenplay by: Robert Kaufman
- Story by: Leonora Thuna
- Produced by: Robert Kaufman; Jerome M. Zeitman
- Starring: Susan Saint James; Jane Curtin; Jessica Lange; Richard Benjamin; Eddie Albert; Cathryn Damon; Dabney Coleman; Garrett Morris; Fred Willard
- Cinematography: James Crabe
- Edited by: Bill Butler
- Music by: Patrick Williams
- Production companies: Cinema 77; Stage III Productions
- Distributed by: Filmways
- Release date: July 11, 1980
- Running time: 105 minutes
- Country: United States
- Language: English
- Budget: $4.8 million
- Box office: $7.5 million or $2.4 million

How to Beat the High Cost of Living is a 1980 American comedy heist film directed by Robert Scheerer and starring Susan Saint James, Jane Curtin, and Jessica Lange. Set in the aftermath of the economic recession of the 1970s, the film follows three women in Eugene, Oregon who, each facing personal and financial crises and desperate for money, devise a plan to steal a large amount of cash from a giveaway event in Valley River Center, Eugene's real-life shopping mall. The film features supporting performances by Dabney Coleman, Fred Willard, Richard Benjamin, Eddie Albert, Scott Elliott, Cathryn Damon, Sybil Danning, and a cameo by Curtin's fellow Saturday Night Live co-star Garrett Morris.

The film was produced by American International Pictures (AIP) but released under Filmways in the summer of 1980, as AIP had merged with the latter following the film's completion. It is considered the final AIP production, before its revival by MGM in 2020.

== Plot ==
Jane, Elaine, and Louise are suburbanites in Eugene, Oregon. Friends since high school, they are struggling with money due to a turbulent national economy and high inflation. Jane is divorced, trying to cope with the man she is dating, Robert; her newly single father, who moves in after his wife leaves him for another woman; and her young children, who need dental work. Jane learns she is pregnant, which makes Robert unhappy since both he and Jane are nearly broke. Elaine's husband, an architect, has left her for a younger woman. He has also left her with overdue bills, no money, and no credit cards. Louise owns an unsuccessful antiques store, and relies on funds from her veterinarian husband Albert to keep the store open.

After her electricity is shut off, a depressed Elaine gets drunk and her car is pulled over by police officer Jack. Elaine makes a pass at him, trying to get out of the ticket. Jack accepts, but then reveals he is married, and Elaine smacks him with her purse. Meanwhile, Louise is served a court order and learns that Albert plans on suing her to force her into bankruptcy to wipe away the debt she has incurred.

The women become desperate. Elaine has a yard sale to raise money, selling her husband's possessions. At the peak of their woes, Elaine visits a mall, where an acquaintance, Natalie, has coaxed her into helping out with staging a community pageant. Elaine stares at a clear ball soon due to hold thousands of dollars in a giant cash "give away" and formulates the idea of stealing the money. She calls Jane and Louise to the mall, where they scheme to steal the money by drilling a hole beneath the ball and sucking out as much cash as possible with a high-powered vacuum, then escaping via the river behind the mall. Despite getting caught by Jack in the act of stealing items needed for the heist, Elaine again sweet-talks her way out of being taken to jail. As a test run to prepare themselves, the women drive to Medford and appoint Jane to attempt an armed robbery at a Safeway, but her sheepish effort fails when the cashier mistakes her pistol for a toy water gun she assumes Jane is purchasing.

On the evening of the heist, each women goes to the mall. Jane and Louise go to work beneath the cash ball while Elaine readies herself to throw the switch to the mall's lighting controls, aiding their escape. However, a minor occurrence nearly causes mall security to notice the noise caused by Jane and Louise stealing the money. With no other way to distract the guards and shoppers, Elaine begins to rant about the high cost of living and how so many things cost "the shirt off your back – and even that's not enough!" She begins an impromptu striptease, exposing her bosom to the crowd. An indoor light pole falls into the ball, sending cash flowing out into the mall, driving people into a frenzy to collect it. During the uproar above, Jane and Louise escape to the river with two trash bags filled with cash, only to have their canoe tip over when Louise stands up. They both fall in, and Louise cannot swim, leaving Jane to decide to save the cash or her friend. She saves Louise and the two bags float away.

Hours later, the sun is rising and the three women are still on the bank of the river, crestfallen over the loss of the money. They begin to argue, but Louise notices a bag floating by and all three of them dive in after it.

Some time later, Jane has married Robert and gotten her father a condo in a senior's complex; Louise reopens her store and takes back Albert, whom she had left; and Elaine begins dating Jack, with enough secret money to return to the lifestyle she had been accustomed to.

== Cast ==
- Susan Saint James as Jane
- Jane Curtin as Elaine Houghton
- Jessica Lange as Louise Travis
- Dabney Coleman as John "Jack" Heintzel
- Richard Benjamin as Albert Travis
- Fred Willard as Robert
- Eddie Albert as Max
- Cathryn Damon as Natalie
- Ronnie Schell as Bill Pike
- Michael Bell as Tom
- Sybil Danning as Charlotte
- Al Checco as Tim Lundy
- Susan Tolsky as Patty
- Art Metrano as Gas Station Attendant
- Garrett Morris as Power and Light Man

== Production ==
=== Development ===
Robert Kaufman had written the script for How to Beat the High Cost of Living in 1971–1972, and Kaufman (and then later with Jere Henshaw) had 20th Century-Fox, Warner Bros., and Universal Pictures, all interested in the project if he could land major, bankable stars. Kaufman and Henshaw could not get the film made until Henshaw was hired by American International Pictures as executive senior vice president in charge of production. The pair first made the financially successful Love at First Bite, which gave them the green light to make How to Beat the High Cost of Living with younger, lesser-known names. The screenplay was originally titled Moneyball.

=== Casting ===
In 1975, during the production's early development stages, Carol Burnett and Glenda Jackson were originally attached to star in the film. After Burnett dropped out of the production, Jackson was to co-star with Jane Fonda and Shirley MacLaine, though this iteration of the cast never reached fruition.

After 20th Century-Fox acquired the rights to develop the film, they sought Ali MacGraw, Goldie Hawn, and Barbra Streisand for the lead roles; Ann-Margret was also considered. After the development with 20th Century-Fox fell through and American International Pictures took over the production, offers were made to Margot Kidder, Dyan Cannon, Sally Field, and Diane Keaton, but each turned down the project. Eventually, Jane Curtin, who had garnered notoriety for her work on Saturday Night Live, was cast, alongside Susan Saint James and Jessica Lange.

Many of the minor supporting cast were hired from the Oregon Repertory Theater Company, in addition to approximately two thousand locals hired as extras, as well as cheerleaders from the University of Oregon.

=== Filming ===
The production was originally planned to film in Salem, Oregon, but instead was shot in Eugene due to the screenplay requiring a shopping mall location that was near a river; Eugene's Valley River Center is positioned against the bank of the Willamette River. The production was budgeted at $4.75 million with a 42-day shooting schedule. Filming began on September 5, 1979 and wrapped in late October.

While filming an outdoor scene in Eugene, a middle-aged man drove by in a car and yelled "Jane, you ignorant slut!", referring to the Curtin and Dan Aykroyd Weekend Update Point/Counterpoint segment on Saturday Night Live.

== Release ==
=== Critical response ===
Vincent Canby of The New York Times called it "a feeble house-fly of a comedy that unsuccessfully attempts to make fun of one of the more dismaying problems of our time: inflation" and that it was "a waste of money." He thought Kaufman's screenplay was "full of failed wisecracks about money, sex, children, marriage and even former President Richard M. Nixon" and that Scheerer was "something of a con artist in the way he has persuaded some gallant actors to make fools of themselves to such small purpose."

=== Home media ===
MGM Home Entertainment released How to Beat the High Cost of Living on DVD in 2003. In 2015, Olive Films released the film on Blu-ray and DVD.

== Sources ==
- Craig, Rob (2019). American International Pictures: A Comprehensive Filmography. Jefferson, North Carolina: McFarland. ISBN 978-1-476-63522-4.
