= Santa Clara, Eugene, Oregon =

Unincorporated community in the state of Oregon, United States

Coordinates: 44°06′56″N 123°08′04″W

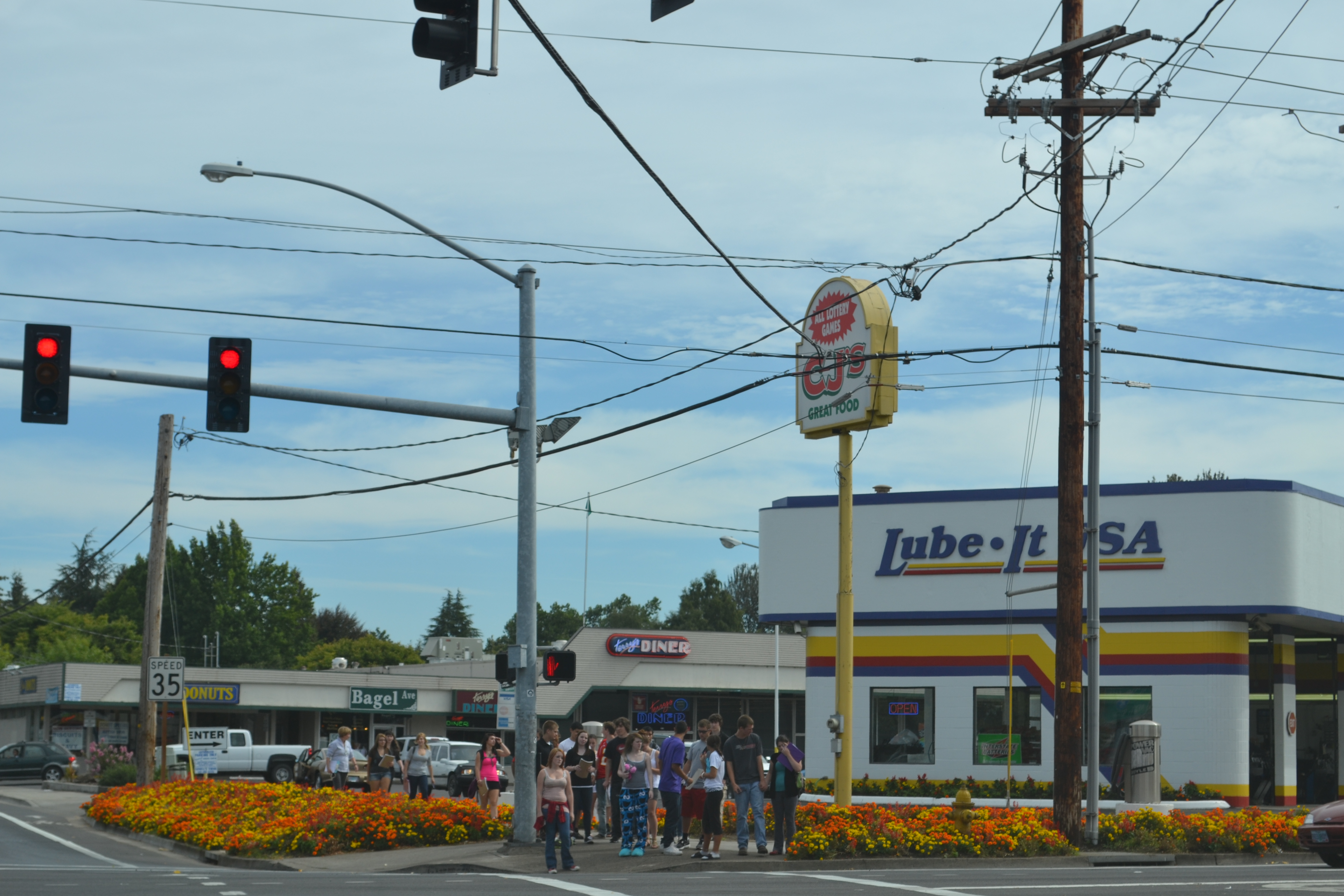
Santa Clara (Eugene, Oregon)

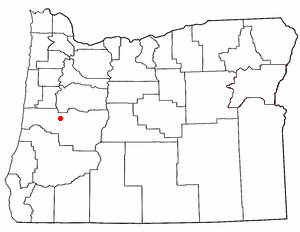

Santa Clara is a community located in Lane County, Oregon and a neighborhood of Eugene. Prior to a number of partial annexations by the city between 1990 and 2005, Santa Clara was an unincorporated community and census-designated place in Lane County. Its current population is approximately 13,000.

According to U.S. Census Bureau figures, the racial composition of Santa Clara's population is 91 percent white, 0.8 percent black, 1.2 percent American Indian, 1.2 percent Asian, 0.2 percent Pacific Islander, 2.2 percent some other race, and 3.4 percent two or more races. Latinos, who may be of any race, form 4.7 percent of Santa Clara's population.

== Geography ==
Santa Clara is located on the banks of the Willamette River. Its northern boundary is considered to be Beacon Drive in Eugene, the southern boundary is Oregon Route 569 (Randy Pape Belt Line Road), its western boundary is the Northwest Expressway, and its eastern boundary is the river.

Santa Clara has an elevation of 388 feet (118 m).

Approximately 40 percent of the land area of Santa Clara lies within the city limits of Eugene, while the remaining 60 percent is unincorporated.

== Education ==
The Santa Clara CDP is mostly in the Eugene School District, with a portion in Bethel School District 52.

Lane County is in the Lane Community College district.

== See also ==
- Irving, Eugene, Oregon
