= Valley River Center =

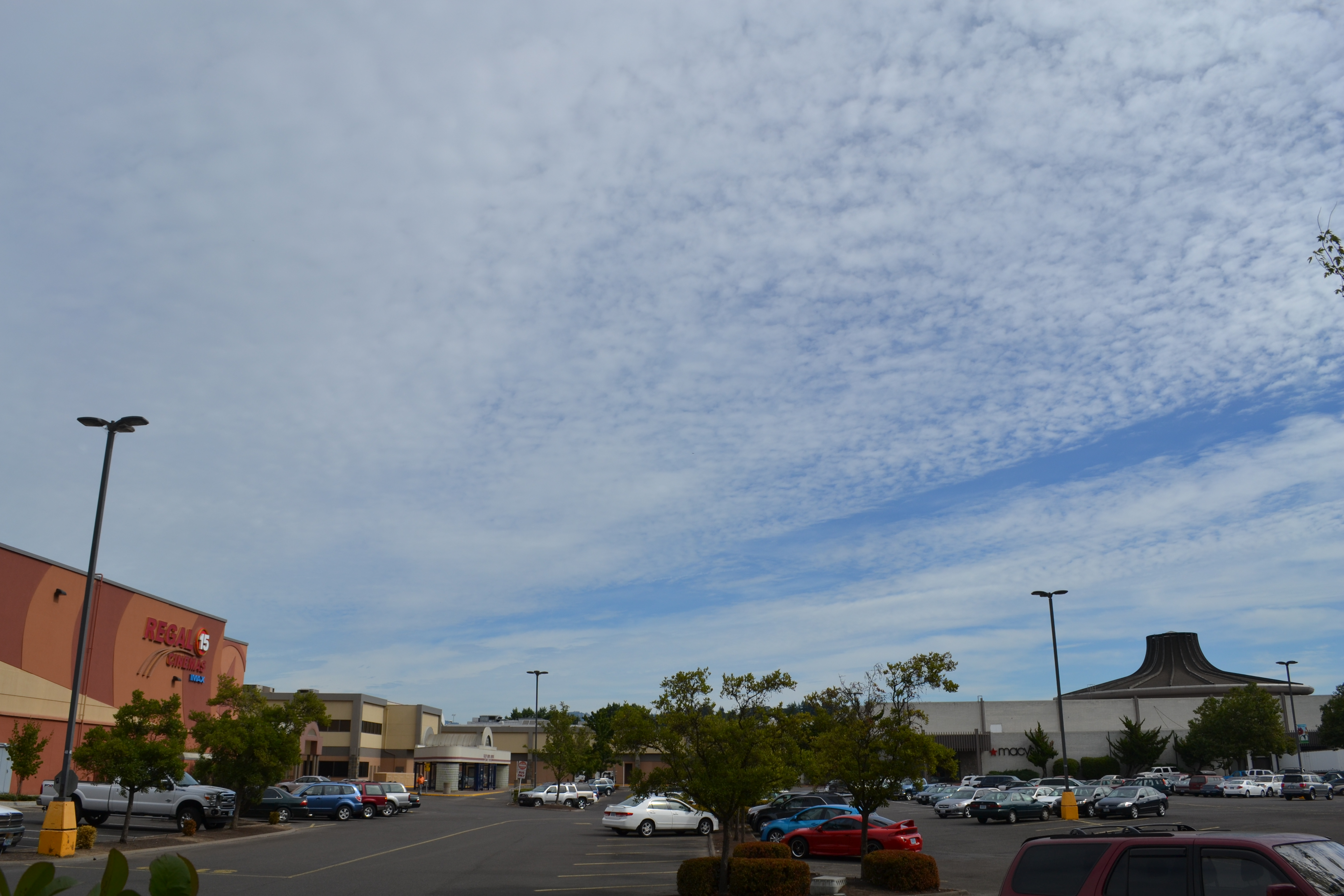
- Location: Eugene, Oregon; 44.069604°N 123.106956°W
- Opened: August 4, 1969; 57 years ago
- Manager: The Macerich Company
- Owner: The Macerich Company
- Num. of stores: 90
- Num. of anchor tenants: 4
- Floor area: 835,000 sq ft (77,600 m^{2})
- Floors: 1 + mezzanine (2 in JCPenney and Macy's, closed 2nd floor in Round One Entertainment)
- Website: valleyrivercenter.com

Valley River Center is a super-regional-class shopping mall located in Eugene, Oregon, U.S. It is the fourth largest shopping center between Portland and Sacramento. The mall features over 90 local and national stores and restaurants. Anchor stores include JCPenney, Macy's, Regal Cinemas, and Round One Entertainment. Located on the banks of the Willamette River, the mall is easily accessible by bike and walking paths.

== History ==
The mall opened in 1969 with JCPenney and Meier & Frank as the original anchors. Later expansions added Montgomery Ward and The Bon Marché to the mall. In 2001, Montgomery Ward closed its doors, eventually replacing it with Regal Cinemas. In 2003, The Bon Marché operated as Bon-Macy's until 2005 when it fully changed to Macy's. In 2006, The Macerich Company, the firm managing the property, purchased the property from the previous owner, Grosvenor. In that same year, Macy's moved from the smaller Bon Marché building into the bigger Meier & Frank building (which it owns; not by The Macerich Company), sub-leasing its original location to Gottschalks, which opened a year later. After Sports Authority ceased operations, its former location was torn down to make way for two new restaurant locations. On March 12, 2019, it was announced that Round One Entertainment would be opening an amusement center in the former Gottschalks anchor building sometime in late 2019.

== In popular culture ==
In 1979, some scenes for the movie How to Beat the High Cost of Living were filmed in Valley River Center.

== See also ==
- List of shopping malls in Oregon
