= Eugene School District 4J =

School district in Oregon, United States

Address
- 200 North Monroe Street Eugene, Oregon; United States

District information
- Type: Public
- Motto: 4J Vision 20/20: Every student connected to community and empowered to succeed
- Grades: PreK–12
- Established: 1854
- Superintendent: Miriam Mickelson
- NCES District ID: 4104740

Students and staff
- Students: 15,110.44 (2023-24)
- Teachers: 1,111 (FTE)
- Staff: 2,152 (FTE)
- Student–teacher ratio: 13.60:1

Other information
- Website: www.4j.lane.edu

Eugene School District 4J is a public school district in the U.S. state of Oregon. It is one of two school districts that serve the city of Eugene.

== Demographics ==
Eugene School District 4J spans 155 square miles (400 km^{2}) in the southern Willamette Valley, including the city of Coburg and a small part of Linn County to the north. About 85 percent of the City of Eugene lies inside 4J's boundaries. It also includes a portion of Springfield, and most of the census-designated places of River Road and Santa Clara. The Linn County portion only includes unincorporated areas.

About 15,100 students attend school in the district's 20 elementary school programs, 8 middle schools, 4 comprehensive high schools, and various alternative high school programs — making it one of the most populous of Oregon's approximately 200 school districts. The five public charter schools located in the district serve about 850 additional students.

Approximately 25 percent of the student body and 10 percent of the teaching staff are members of racial/ethnic minority groups.

In the 2009 school year, the district had 743 students classified as homeless by the Department of Education, or 4.2% of students in the district.

== History ==
The district that would evolve into Eugene School District 4J started in 1854, five years before Oregon attained statehood. The district is numbered 4J because it was the fourth school district incorporated in Lane County and is a joint (J) district — its boundary includes a small part of Linn County to the north. The district's name changed in 1964, when it absorbed Coburg School (since closed and now one of the 5 charter schools), whose attendance boundary goes nearly to Harrisburg.

== School district structure ==
Eugene School District 4J is a K–12 public school district with elementary schools serving grades K–5, middle schools serving grades 6–8, high schools serving grades 9–12, and special education transition programs up to age 21. Every residence in the district is within the attendance boundary of a neighborhood elementary, middle and high school. A majority of students attend their neighborhood schools, but the district's school choice policy allows students to enroll in a different neighborhood school or an alternative school through the school choice process, and a large percentage do so. The district also accepts enrollment from students who reside outside the district boundaries.

=== Open school choice policy ===
The district's sometimes-controversial open school choice policy means that families who live in the district may enroll their children in any 4J school, provided there is space available. Most parents choose to have their children attend the neighborhood school near their home, but others elect to enroll their children in a different neighborhood school or in an alternative school. For students requesting enrollment in a school other than their own neighborhood school, open slots are granted in an order determined by the district's annual school choice lottery.

The district is home to several magnet schools, officially known as "alternative schools." These include five language immersion programs in four languages—Spanish, Japanese, French and Chinese.

== School programs ==
=== Alternative schools and language immersion ===
Among the district's 20 elementary schools, five schools immerse the students in a foreign language for half or all of the day: River Road/El Camino del Rio Spanish/English dual immersion, Buena Vista Spanish immersion, Yujin Gakuen Japanese immersion, Charlemagne French immersion and, starting in fall 2017, a Mandarin Chinese language immersion program. Language immersion offerings continue K–12, allowing students to continue their intensive Spanish, French or Japanese programs through middle school and high school. The Chinese immersion program launching in 2017 is planned to grow to continue through middle and high school. The district also has two non-language-immersion alternative (magnet) elementary schools that have no neighborhood catchment area and enroll students solely by request and lottery placement: Corridor Elementary School and Family School. Eugene International High School offers programs within three of the district's four regional high schools — Churchill, Sheldon and South Eugene. Early College and Career Options (ECCO) is a school that offers alternative educational pathways. The school is an inclusive environment and serves grades 10–12.

=== Elementary schools ===
The Eugene School District's elementary schools serve grades K–5. Full-day kindergarten is provided in all of the district's elementary schools.

- Adams Elementary School
- Awbrey Park Elementary School
- Bertha Holt Elementary School
- Buena Vista Spanish Immersion Elementary School
- Camas Ridge Community Elementary School
- César E. Chávez Elementary School
- Charlemagne French Immersion Elementary School
- Chinese Immersion Elementary School (opened fall 2017)
- Edgewood Community Elementary School
- Edison Elementary School
- Family School
- Gilham Elementary School
- Howard Elementary School
- McCornack Elementary School
- River Road/El Camino del Río Elementary School
  - Neighborhood elementary school offering Spanish/English dual immersion program
- Spring Creek Elementary School
- Twin Oaks Elementary School
- Willagillespie Elementary School
- Yujin Gakuen Japanese Immersion Elementary School
  - Roughly translated from Japanese, the name means "happy garden of learning"

Note: Coburg, Crest Drive, Meadowlark and Parker Elementary Schools were closed in 2011, and a number of other schools previously closed over decades of declining enrollment after the Baby Boom.

=== Middle schools ===
The Eugene School District's middle-level school model is middle schools serving grades 6, 7 and 8.

- Arts & Technology Academy
  - Was Located in the former Jefferson Middle School building until fall 2017
  - Neighborhood middle school, grades 6–8 (previously a K–8 school)
  - Oregon Model STEM Lab School, with STEM/STEAM studies (science, technology, engineering, (art) & math) infused throughout curriculum
- Cal Young Middle School
  - Named for Cal Young, prominent pioneer of Eugene, Oregon, and first head football coach of the University of Oregon
  - Founded in 1953
  - New school building opened in 2006
- Kelly Middle School
  - Named for WWII pilot Colin Kelly
  - Hosts middle level of K–12 Spanish immersion program in North Eugene region
  - Hosts middle level of K–12 Japanese immersion program in North Eugene region
- Kennedy Middle School
  - Named for President John F. Kennedy
- Madison Middle School
  - Named for President James Madison
- Monroe Middle School
  - Named for President James Monroe
  - Hosts middle level of K–12 Spanish immersion program in Eugene's Sheldon region
- Roosevelt Middle School
  - Named for First Lady Eleanor Roosevelt
  - Hosts middle level of K–12 French immersion program in South Eugene region
  - New school building opened in 2016
  - Lowest GPA students
- Spencer Butte Middle School
  - Named for a geographical feature of the region

=== High schools ===
The Eugene School District includes four comprehensive regional high schools and some alternative programs at the high school level.

Churchill High School (1966) serves the southwest portion of Eugene, as well as rural areas south and west of the city. North Eugene (1957) serves the River Road and Santa Clara neighborhoods northwest of the city center. Sheldon (1963) students come from the Coburg Road area north of downtown Eugene, as well as the city of Coburg and the rural area in between. South Eugene (1901), formerly Eugene High, is the district's oldest high school. It serves the area of Eugene south and east of the downtown area and the University of Oregon.

- Churchill High School
  - Listed as one of America's Best High Schools (Silver Medal) by U.S. News & World Report and Newsweek
- North Eugene High School
  - Nationally recognized as one of America's Best High Schools (Bronze Medal) by U.S. News & World Report
- Sheldon High School
  - Nationally recognized in Newsweek's annual list of the nation's best public high schools of the year in 2010
- South Eugene High School
  - Listed as one of America's Best High Schools (Silver Medal) by U.S. News & World Report and Newsweek
- Eugene International High School
- Transition Education Network, formerly Life Skills Network
- Eugene Education Options

=== Charter schools ===
The district also sponsors five public charter schools, which receive public funds but operate independently of the school district: Coburg Community Charter School, Ridgeline Montessori Public Charter School, The Village School, Network Charter School, and Twin Rivers Charter School.

Ridgeline Montessori, a K–8 program founded in 2000 as one of Oregon's first charter schools, is a publicly funded school based on Montessori educational philosophy and methods. The Village School, also founded in 2000, describes itself as a holistic, arts-integrated program inspired by Waldorf education. The school board approved a charter for Coburg Community Charter School after Coburg Elementary School, the public school which had existed in the small town of Coburg since the mid-1800s, was closed in 2011 due to low enrollment and a statewide school budget crisis. The curriculum of the Network Charter School, in downtown Eugene, is drawn from an alliance of local businesses and non-profits. Twin Rivers Charter School is the fifth and newest program chartered in the Eugene School District, in operation since 2014. It serves students ages 14–19 in an experiential school environment.

== Administration ==
Dr. Miriam Mickelson is currently the superintendent as of May 27, 2026

The Board of Directors has seven members elected from the district at large to serve four-year terms; board members serve without pay. The school board serves as the policy-making body of the school district. The Eugene School Board selects the superintendent as the district's executive officer and delegates the responsibility for implementing its policies and plans to the superintendent. The board also has the annual responsibility of adopting a balanced school district budget, developed in a budget process along with seven appointed citizen members of the district's budget committee.

The school board meets in regular public sessions at the 4J Education Center, 200 North Monroe, Eugene. Special meetings and work sessions are scheduled as necessary. All regular board meetings are broadcast live on the district's radio station, KRVM-AM 1280, and audio recordings are posted to the district's website. The school board encourages public input. Comments on items that are not on the board's agenda may be made at the beginning of each meeting. Audience members who wish to speak may sign up at the beginning of the meeting. Comments also may be sent to the board via email.

Board members for 2024–25 school year:

- Maya Rabasa
- Jenny Jonak
- Tom Di Liberto
- Judy Newman
- Rick Hamilton
- Morgan Munro
- Erika Thessen

== See also ==
- Bethel School District
- Springfield School District
- List of school districts in Oregon
- Marist High School
