= KRVM-FM =

Coordinates: 44.002°N 123.114°W

- Eugene, Oregon; United States
- Broadcast area: Eugene–Springfield, Oregon
- Frequency: 91.9 MHz (HD Radio)
- Branding: KRVM 91.9

Programming
- Format: Variety
- Subchannels: HD2: Alternative rock

Ownership
- Owner: Eugene School District 4J; (Lane County School District No. 4J)

History
- First air date: December 6, 1947
- Former frequencies: 90.1 MHz (1947–1954)
- Call sign meaning: "Keeping Real Variety in Music"

Technical information
- Licensing authority: FCC
- Facility ID: 59340
- Class: C2
- ERP: 15,000 watts horiz 6,400 watts vert
- HAAT: 276 meters (906 ft)
- Translator: 90.1 K211BP (Florence)
- Repeaters: 88.5 KAVE (Oakridge); 92.1 KSYD (Reedsport)

Links
- Public license information: Public file; LMS
- Webcast: Listen Live
- Website: krvm.org

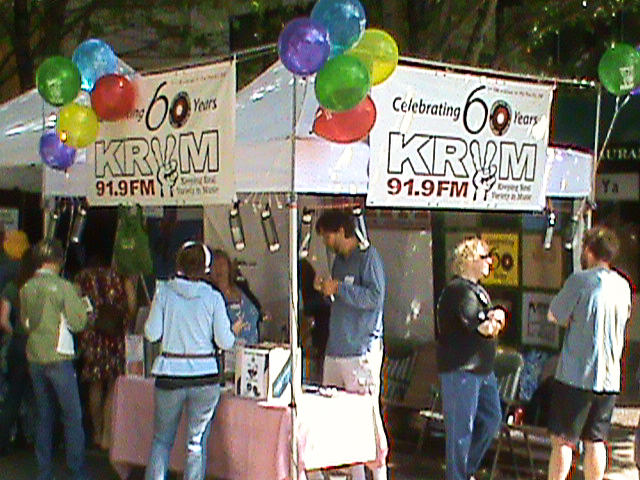
The KRVM booth at the 2010 Eugene Celebration

KRVM-FM (91.9 MHz) is a community radio station in Eugene, Oregon, United States. Its license and studio facility are owned by Eugene School District 4J, but the school district provides no direct funding to the station; all funding comes from listener supporters, business underwriters, and the Corporation For Public Broadcasting. The main studio is located at Sheldon High School.

Two additional stations, KSYD (92.1 FM) in Reedsport (serving Coos Bay) and KAVE (88.5 FM) in Oakridge, rebroadcast KRVM-FM, as does a translator, K211BP (90.1 FM) in Florence, Oregon. KRVM-FM broadcasts in HD Radio. The station also streams its program online.

KRVM primarily plays adult album alternative music, with high school students handling much of the hosting and voice tracking. Other hours consist of specialty programming, hosted by volunteers, encompassing different genres of music.

== History ==
KRVM-FM is the oldest public radio station in the state of Oregon. The first words ever spoken on FM radio in the Pacific Northwest were broadcast on KRVM on December 6, 1947, and the station formally opened in early 1948. It was the only educational FM station west of Minneapolis and north of San Francisco and just the twelfth in the United States. The call letters were almost WDWD until Roger Houglum, the founder of the station, advised the Federal Communications Commission of its mistake in assigning a call sign starting with W to a station west of the Mississippi River. Originally on 90.1 MHz, the station moved to 91.9 MHz in 1954 because it generated interference to television sets attempting to tune in KOIN-TV on channel 6 (82–88 MHz) in Portland.

Over the years, KRVM operated satellite studios at Churchill High School, South Eugene High School, North Eugene High School, and Spencer Butte Middle School. Spencer Butte was the last satellite studio in operation, before it was closed sometime between 2018 and 2020.

In 2003, KRVM came close to its demise. In April the School District was under financial pressure due to decreased state funding, and was facing the possibility of laying off teachers or reducing school hours. It considered selling KRVM to eliminate the $100,000 the station was costing them. Several noncommercial companies then showed interest in buying KRVM. After public backlash, in May the School Board decided to let the station remain, but KRVM would have to rely on its own fundraising. By the fall of that year, after an outpouring of support from the public, the station had raised $135,000. Meanwhile, an independent support organization, Friends of KRVM, was created as a sort of rainy day fund to ensure its future existence.

== See also ==
- Community radio
- List of community radio stations in the United States
