= KRVM (AM) =

Coordinates: 44°06′2.4″N 123°03′10.3″W

- Eugene, Oregon; United States
- Broadcast area: Southern Willamette Valley
- Frequency: 1280 kHz
- Branding: JPR News and Information

Programming
- Format: News and information
- Affiliations: National Public Radio; Jefferson Public Radio

Ownership
- Owner: Eugene School District 4J; (Lane County School District 4J)
- Operator: Southern Oregon University

History
- First air date: 1949 (as KERG)
- Former call signs: KERG (1949–1974); KBDF (1974–1984); KYKN (1984–1985); KQAK (1985–1987); KWOW (1987); KQAK (1987); KDUK (1987–1996)
- Call sign meaning: "Radio Vocational Mechanics"

Technical information
- Licensing authority: FCC
- Facility ID: 54009
- Class: B
- Power: 5,000 watts day 1,500 watts night
- Translator: 98.7 K254DN (Eugene)

Links
- Public license information: Public file; LMS
- Webcast: Listen live
- Website: www.ijpr.org

KRVM (1280 AM) is an NPR-member radio station broadcasting a news and information format. Licensed to Eugene, Oregon, United States, the station is currently owned by and licensed to Eugene School District 4J, and is affiliated with Jefferson Public Radio.

== History ==
The station KERG was licensed or began operation at 1,000 watts on November 9, 1949 under the ownership of Eugene Broadcasters Inc, principally owned by Guard Publishing Co., publisher of the Eugene Register-Guard newspaper. The Guard Publishing Company sold KERG to Mattco, Inc. in January 1974. The new owner changed the station's call letters to KBDF on February 1, 1974. Mattco sold KBDF to Jayar Communications Corporation in 1978; owner of KZEL-FM. KBDF's format was Top 40, but switched to Oldies in 1980, and all-news (CNN) in 1982. In March 1984, the station's call letters were changed to KYKN as "Kickin' Country." This format was short-lived, as the station was acquired by the owner of KDUK, which changed KYKN to KQAK in 1985, and then KDUK in 1987, when the FM side became KLCX.

In the mid 90's KDUK (after the University of Oregon's duck mascot) briefly dropped its Sports format and became an affiliate of Radio AAHS as "The Little Duck" with "great music for great kids." After a few months, KDUK returned to the Sports format. In the fall of 1996, KDUK's owner donated the station to the Eugene School District 4J; owners of KRVM. They changed the call letters of the AM to KRVM.
