= Malabon, Oregon =

- Unincorporated community
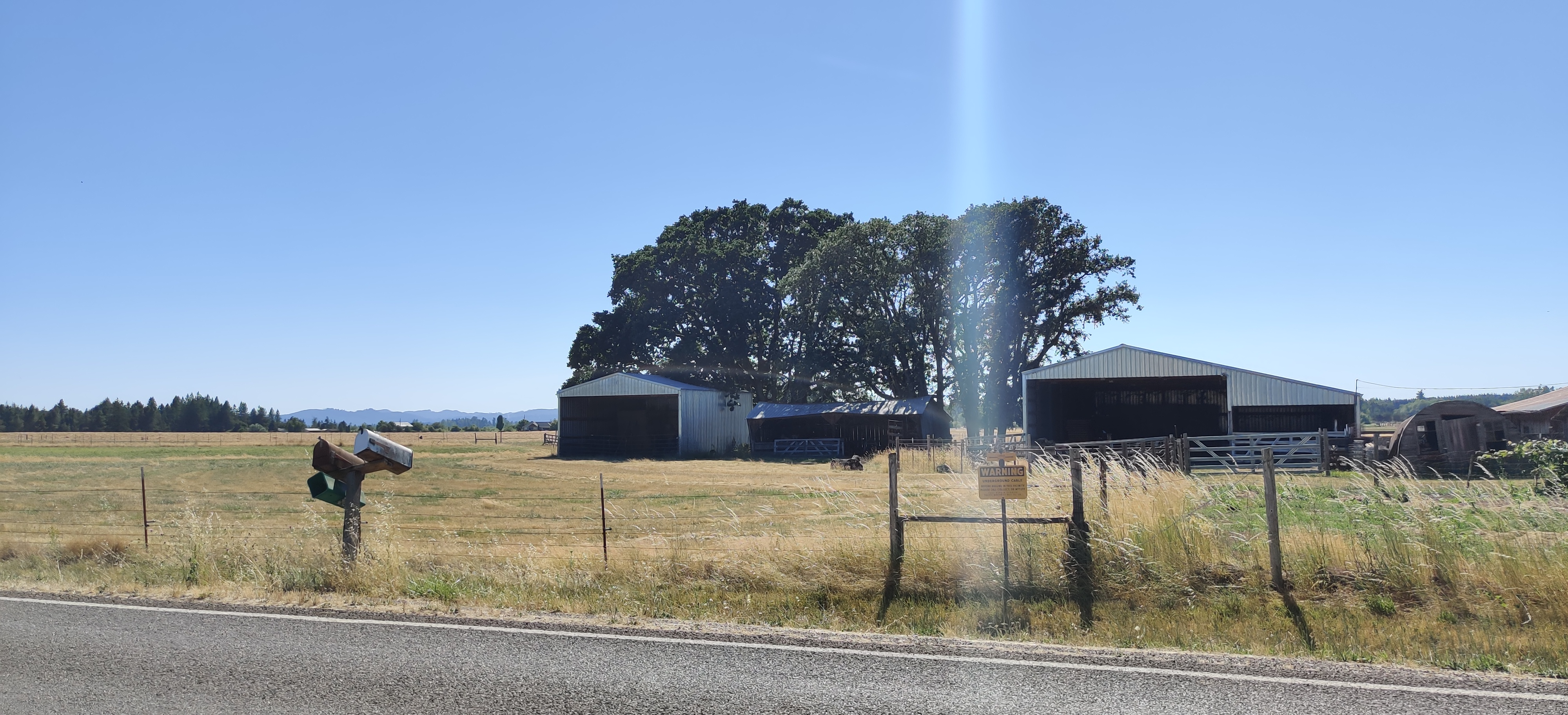
- A farm in Malabon, Oregon

- Location within Oregon Location within the United States
- Coordinates: 44°06′03″N 123°14′17″W
- Country: United States
- State: Oregon
- County: Lane
- Elevation: 377 ft (115 m)
- Time zone: UTC-8 (Pacific (PST))
  - Summer (DST): UTC-7 (PDT)
- GNIS feature ID: 1166549

Malabon (also known as Clear Lake) is a historical unincorporated community in Lane County, Oregon, United States. The area is now a scattered collection of rural houses and farms northwest of Eugene, close to Mahlon Sweet Field.

Clear Lake runs through the area. It is a widened stretch of Amazon Creek, a tributary of the Long Tom River.

The soils around Malabon define a series of soil types.

Malabon Elementary School is some 3.5 miles (5.6 km) east-southeast of the historical community.

The Oregon Historical Society has Southern Pacific Railroad timetables listing Malabon.
