= Mount Pisgah =

Mount Pisgah is the name of several mountains and places:

== Communities ==
- Mount Pisgah, Georgia, an unincorporated community
- Mount Pisgah, Iowa, a semi-permanent settlement from 1846 to 1852 along the Mormon Trail
- Mount Pisgah, North Carolina (unincorporated community)
- Mount Pisgah, Ohio, an unincorporated community

== Mountains ==
=== U.S. ===
- Mount Pisgah (Kennebec County, Maine), the fifth highest point in Kennebec County, Maine
- Mount Pisgah (Massachusetts), the highest point in Northborough, Massachusetts
- Mount Pisgah (New York), in the Catskill Mountains of New York southeast of Bovina Center
- Mount Pisgah (Greene County, New York), in the Catskill Mountains of New York north of Windham
- Mount Pisgah (mountain in North Carolina), in the Appalachian Mountain Range and the Blue Ridge Mountains
- Mount Pisgah (Lane County, Oregon)
- Mount Pisgah, Bradford County, Pennsylvania, in Glaciated Low Plateau region, also known as the Endless Mountains
- Mount Pisgah, Carbon County, Pennsylvania
- Mount Pisgah, York County, Pennsylvania
- Mount Pisgah (Vermont), in Westmore

=== Elsewhere ===
- Mount Pisgah (Quebec), in Appalachian Mountains, at the border of Quebec and Maine
- Mount Pisgah (Bible), the mountain in the Bible from which Moses saw the Promised Land for the first time
- Mount Pisgah (Smith Island), in the South Shetland Islands, Antarctica
- Mount Pisgah (Victoria), a small volcanic lava dome in Australia

== Other ==
- Mount Pisgah Academy, Candler, North Carolina
- Mount Pisgah Arboretum, near Eugene, Oregon
- Mount Pisgah Benevolence Cemetery, Romney, West Virginia
- Mount Pisgah Christian School, Johns Creek, Georgia
- Mt. Pisgah State Park, near Troy, Pennsylvania

== See also ==
- Pisgah Mountain, Pennsylvania
- Pisgah (disambiguation)
