= Pisgah =

The name Pisgah may refer to:

- Mount Pisgah (Bible)

== Places ==
=== In the United States ===
==== Communities ====
- Pisgah, Alabama, a town
- Pisgah, Georgia, an unincorporated community
- Pisgah, Iowa, a city
- Pisgah, Illinois, an unincorporated community
- Pisgah, Kentucky, an unincorporated community
- Pisgah, Maryland, an unincorporated community
- Pisgah, Mississippi, an unincorporated community
- Pisgah, Missouri, an unincorporated community
- Pisgah, North Carolina, an unincorporated community
- Pisgah, Ohio, an unincorporated community
- Pisgah, Texas, a ghost town
- Pisgah, West Virginia, an unincorporated community

==== Other ====
- Pisgah Crater, Mohave Desert, California
- Pisgah Branch, a stream in Missouri
- Pisgah State Park, New Hampshire
- Pisgah National Forest, North Carolina
- Pisgah Mountain, Pennsylvania

=== In Wales ===
- Pisgah, Ceredigion, a small village

== Churches ==
- Pisgah United Methodist Church, Tallahassee, Florida, on the National Register of Historic Places
- Pisgah United Methodist Church and Cemetery, Pisgah, Tennessee, on the National Register of Historic Places
- Pisgah Christian Church, Ohio, on the National Register of Historic Places

== Schools ==
- Pisgah High School (Mississippi)
- Pisgah High School (North Carolina)

== Other uses ==
- Pisgah Astronomical Research Institute, North Carolina

== See also ==
- Mount Pisgah (disambiguation)
- Pisgah Grande, a defunct religious community in Las Llajas Canyon, California
- Pisgah Home Historic District, a historic district in Los Angeles, California
