= Mount Pisgah, Pennsylvania =

Mount Pisgah, Pennsylvania may refer to the following peaks in the U.S.:

- Mount Pisgah, Bradford County, Pennsylvania
- Mount Pisgah, Carbon County, Pennsylvania
- Mount Pisgah, York County, Pennsylvania
