= New Mt. Pisgah School =

- U.S. National Register of Historic Places
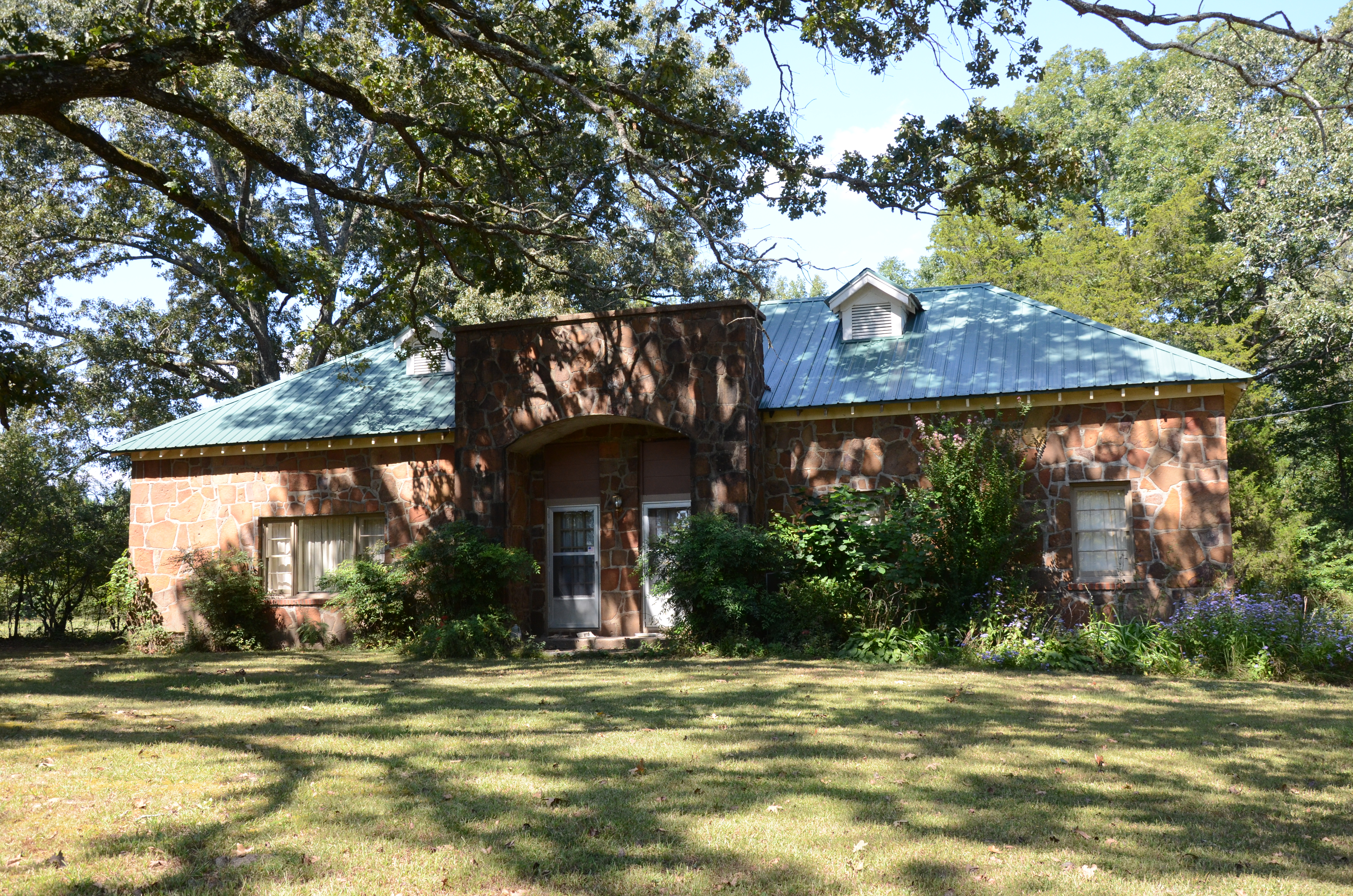

- Location within Arkansas Location within the United States
- Nearest city: Searcy, Arkansas
- Coordinates: 35°19′45″N 91°49′48″W
- Area: less than one acre
- Built by: Works Progress Administration
- Architectural style: WPA Craftsman architecture
- MPS: White County MPS
- NRHP reference No.: 91001331
- Added to NRHP: July 20, 1992

The New Mt. Pisgah School is a historic school building in rural White County, Arkansas. It is located northwest of Searcy, on the north side of Smith Road, east of Mt. Pisgah Road. Built in 1938 with funding from the Works Progress Administration (WPA), the building is one of the county's few surviving examples of a WPA-constructed school and now serves as a private residence.

The building was listed on the National Register of Historic Places in 1992 as part of the White County Multiple Property Submission.

== History ==
=== Mt. Pisgah community ===
The community of Mount Pisgah was settled beginning around 1816 by pioneers from North Carolina, Alabama, and later Illinois. The community's name derives from the biblical Mount Pisgah, the mountain east of the Jordan River from which Moses viewed the Promised Land. Local residents colloquially referred to the area as "Mount Pisgy." By the turn of the 20th century, Mount Pisgah was a thriving village with general stores, a post office (operating from approximately 1880 to 1910), a drugstore, and a medical practice.

=== Construction ===
The New Mt. Pisgah School was constructed in 1938 as part of the Works Progress Administration's extensive building program in Arkansas during the Great Depression. The WPA, established by President Franklin D. Roosevelt in 1935, was responsible for constructing numerous public buildings throughout the state, including schools, courthouses, and community centers. WPA projects employed rural laborers in building public facilities using locally sourced materials, particularly native stone, which became a hallmark of the program's construction in Arkansas.

White County was significantly affected by the Depression, with 4,627 unemployed men recorded in 1933, the economic low point for the county. Several New Deal agencies operated in the county, including the WPA, the National Recovery Administration, and the Agricultural Adjustment Administration. In nearby Searcy, the county seat, the WPA built a city hall and the American Legion Hut using locally sourced stone.

The school originally served the rural community surrounding Mount Pisgah. Like many rural schools of the era, it functioned as a community center as well as an educational facility. The building was converted to a private residence at an undetermined date after its use as a school ended.

== Architecture ==
The New Mt. Pisgah School is a single-story stone structure exhibiting characteristics of WPA Craftsman architecture. The building features a hip roof pierced by dormers, and long eaves with exposed rafter ends, typical elements of the Craftsman style. A segmental arch projects in front of the recessed main entrance, providing a distinctive focal point for the facade.

The use of native stone construction was characteristic of WPA building projects throughout Arkansas during the 1930s. Stone was readily available as a local material, and its use employed local laborers skilled in masonry work. Similar WPA stone school buildings were constructed throughout the region during this period, though relatively few survive in White County.

== See also ==
- National Register of Historic Places listings in White County, Arkansas
- Works Progress Administration
- New Deal
