= Cascade Mycological Society =

American research organization

The Cascade Mycological Society (CMS) is a non-profit organization based in Eugene, Oregon, United States that primarily researches and educates in the field of mycology. It is an affiliate organisation to the North American Mycological Association. It has connections with other groups in the area, such as Mount Pisgah Arboretum and Lane Community College.

== Activities ==
Membership is open to all, and the CMS holds monthly meetings open to the public, offers various community events related to the study of fungi with seasonal outings, and has been involved in the local annual Mushroom Festival since 1981. They publish a monthly newsletter that is available to all members, and have active accounts on various social media platforms to keep members up to date with upcoming programmes and events.
