= Pisgah, Ceredigion =

Village in Ceredigion, Wales

Coordinates: 52.381213°N 3.946741°W

Pisgah
- Location within Ceredigion
- OS grid reference: SN 6759 7769
  - Cardiff: 70.2 mi (113.0 km)
  - London: 173.3 mi (278.9 km)
- Community: Melindwr
- Principal area: Ceredigion
- Country: Wales
- Sovereign state: United Kingdom
- Post town: Aberystwyth
- Postcode district: SY23
- Police: Dyfed-Powys
- Fire: Mid and West Wales
- Ambulance: Welsh
- UK Parliament: Ceredigion Preseli
- Senedd Cymru – Welsh Parliament: Ceredigion

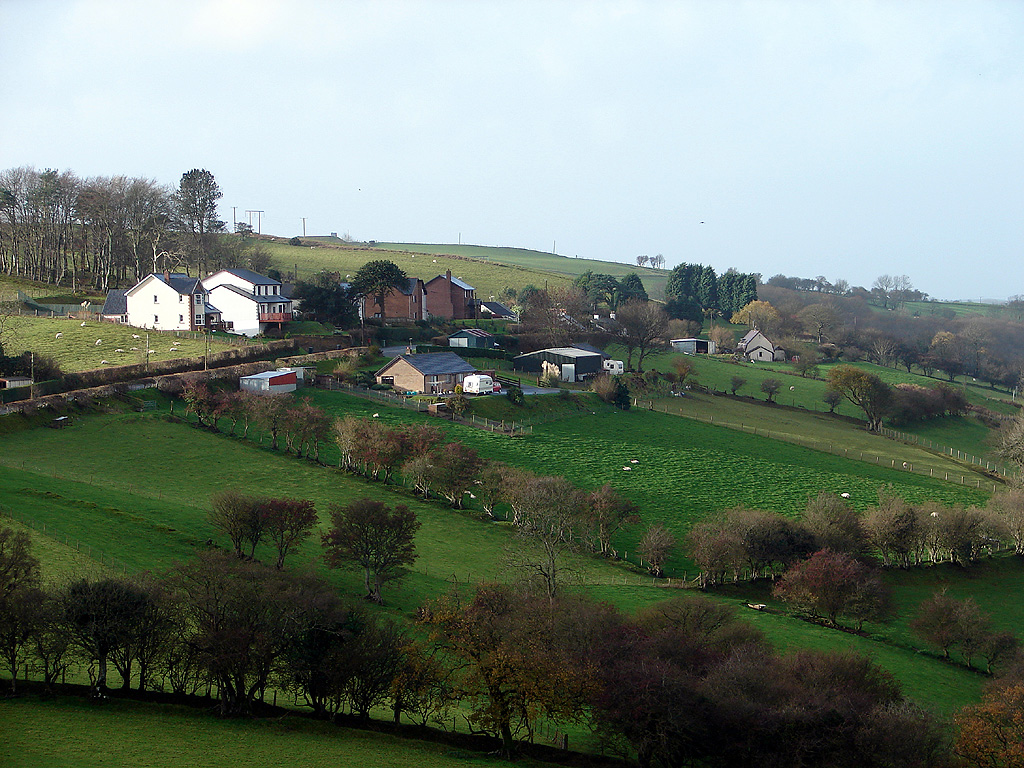
The Hamlet of Pisgah, viewed from a half mile to the east.

Pisgah is a hamlet in the community of Melindwr, Ceredigion, Wales, which is 70.2 miles (113 km) from Cardiff and 173.3 miles (278.8 km) from London. Pisgah is represented in the Senedd by Elin Jones (Plaid Cymru) and the Member of Parliament is Ben Lake (Plaid Cymru).

Pisgah made history in 1922 when it became the first Baptist Church in Great Britain to make a call to a woman pastor. Annie Lodwick took up the post in April 1923.

== See also ==
- Pisgah (disambiguation)
- List of localities in Wales by population
