= Mount Pisgah Academy =

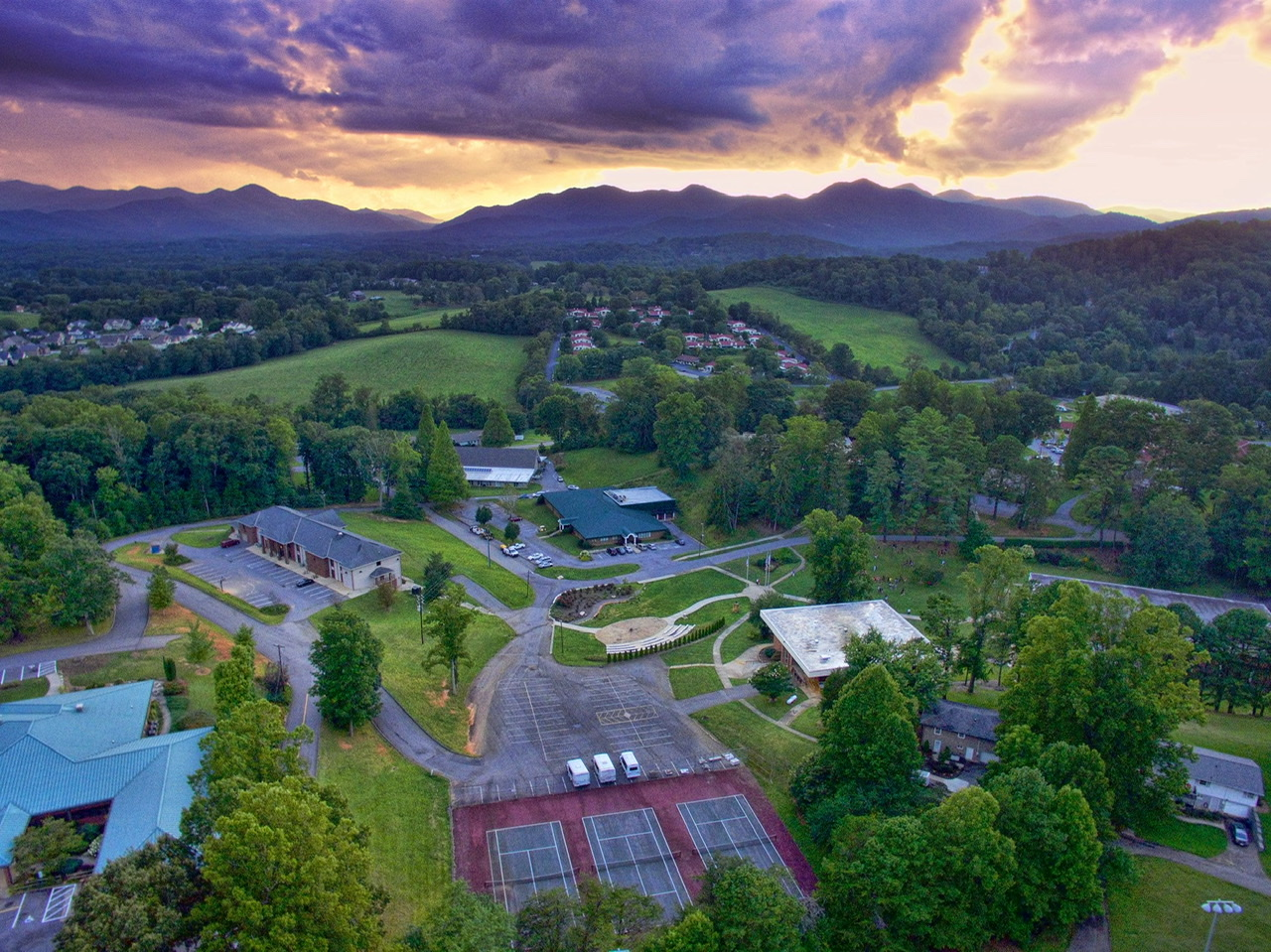
- Aerial view of the Mount Pisgah Academy campus

Location
- 75 Academy Dr; Candler, North Carolina 28715; United States; 35°34′7″N 82°40′15″W

Information
- Type: Private
- Motto: Jesus lives at Mount Pisgah Academy, He lives within our hearts.
- Religious affiliation: Seventh-day Adventist Church
- Established: 1914 (112 years ago)
- Principal: Dewald Coetzer
- Grades: 9–12
- Gender: Co-educational
- Campus size: 230 acres (93 ha)
- Colors: Red and white
- Mascot: Mountaineers
- Accreditation: Adventist Accrediting Association
- Newspaper: Skyliner
- Yearbook: Mountain Memories
- Website: www.pisgah.us

Mount Pisgah Academy is a four-year secondary education boarding and day school located in Candler, North Carolina, United States, near Asheville. The academy is named after the Mount Pisgah of biblical reference as well as its proximity to Mount Pisgah in the Blue Ridge Mountains.

Affiliated with the Seventh-day Adventist Church, the campus lies on 230 acres (93 ha) of property. It was founded in 1914 as a private academy, by E.C. Waller, William Steinman, and C.A. Graves with their families, and originally called the Pisgah Industrial Institute. In 1952, its ownership was transferred to the Carolina Conference of the Seventh-Day Adventist church, and it was given its present name. It is a part of the Seventh-day Adventist education system, the world's second largest Christian school system.

The current principal at the academy is Dewald Coetzer.

For the 2023-2024 school year, it had an enrollment of 90 students.

== See also ==
- List of Seventh-day Adventist secondary schools
- Seventh-day Adventist education
