= Pisgah, Kentucky =

Unincorporated community in Woodford County, Kentucky, US

Coordinates: 38°03′24″N 84°39′18″W

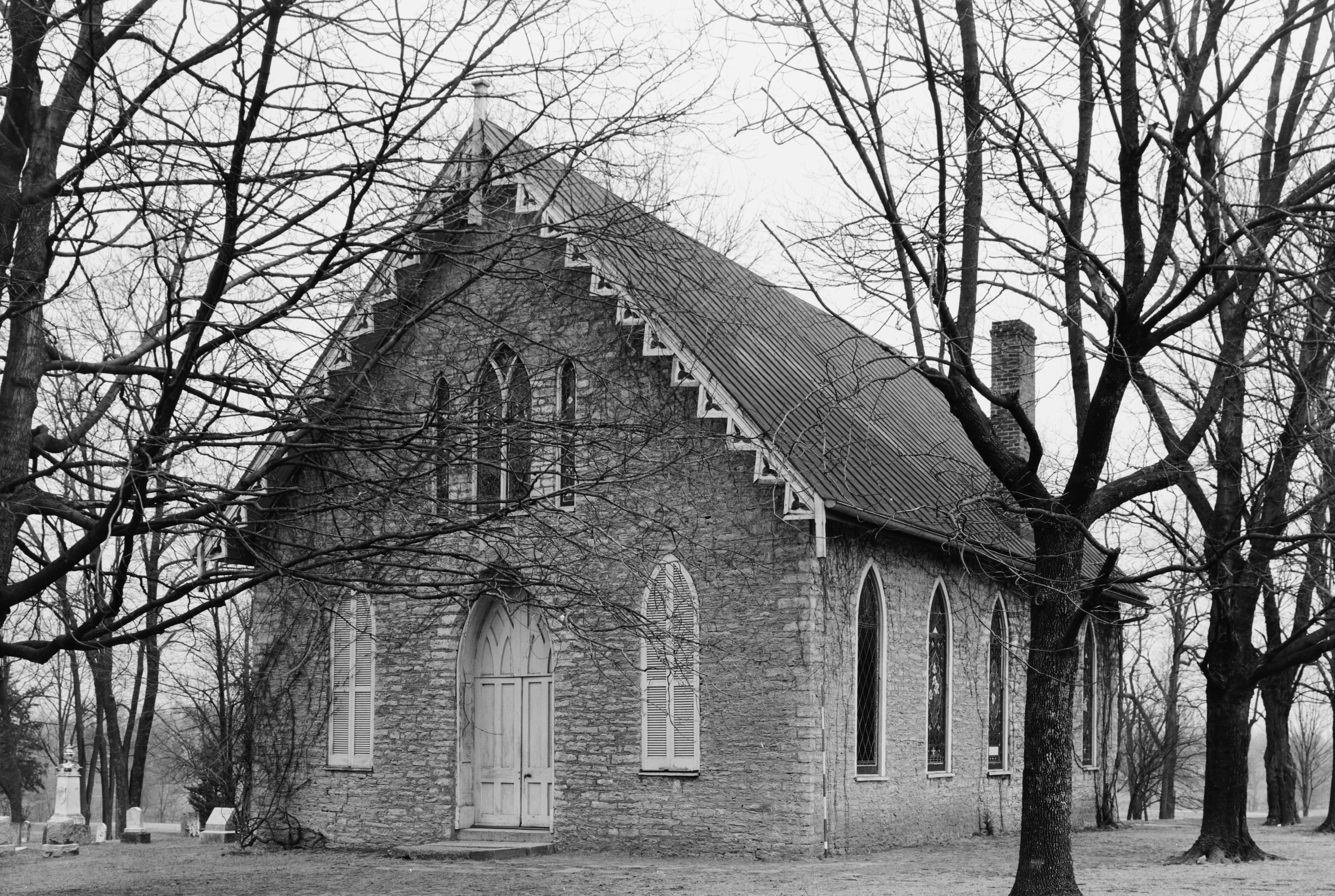
Pisgah Presbyterian Church in 1934

Pisgah is an unincorporated community in Woodford County, in the U.S. state of Kentucky.

== History ==
The first settlement at Pisgah was made in 1784 by a colony from Virginia. The community's name is derived from Mount Pisgah, a mountain mentioned in the Hebrew Bible. Pisgah Presbyterian Church, a local landmark, was founded in 1784. The current building dates from 1812.

The railroad was extended to Pisgah in 1888. A post office called Pisgah was established in 1890, and remained in operation until 1931.
