= Las Llajas Canyon =

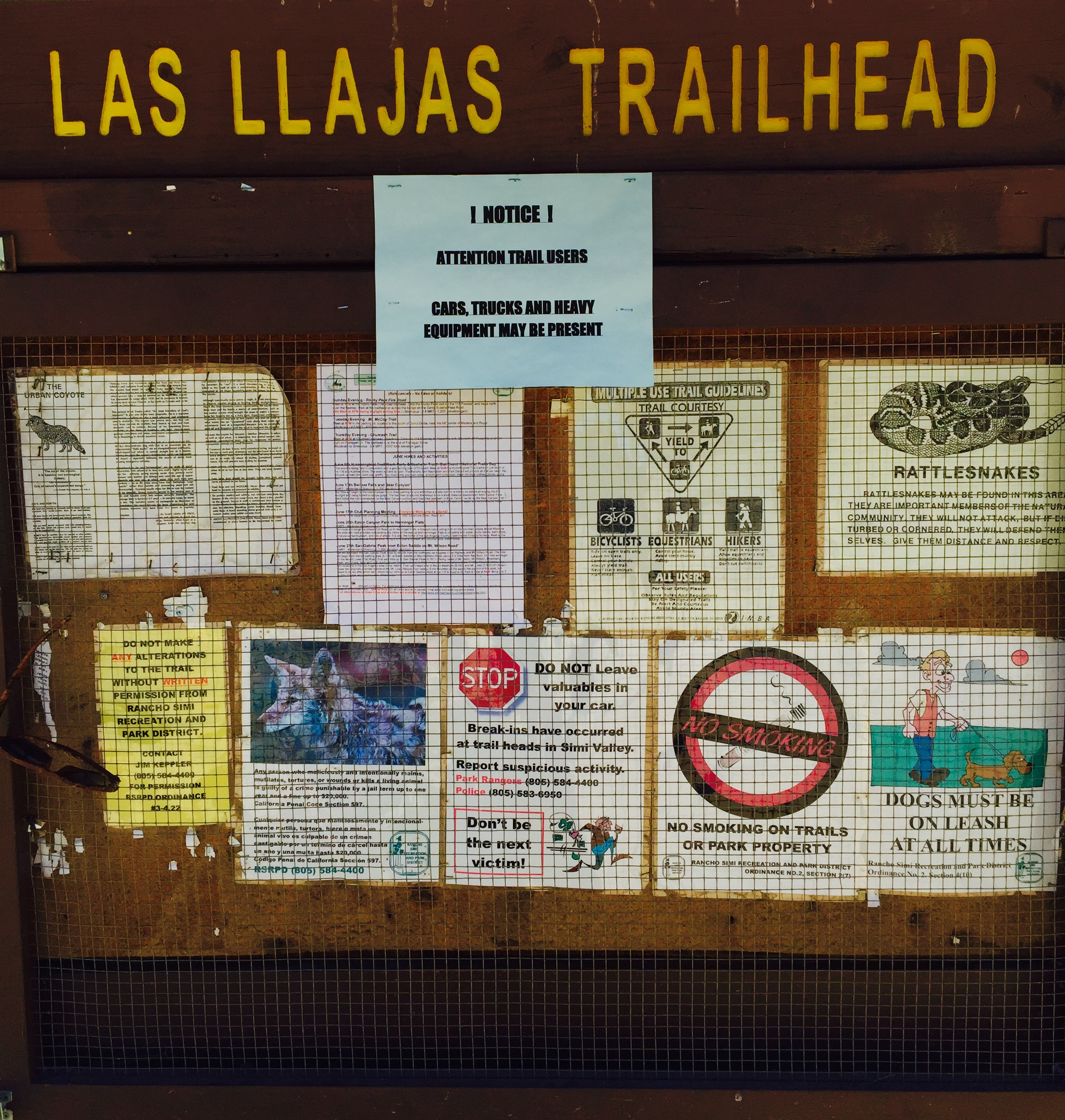
- Sign at the main entrance.
- Interactive map of Las Llajas Canyon
- Type: Public open space, residential subdivision
- Location: Simi Valley, CA
- Coordinates: 34°17′49″N 118°40′49″W
- Area: 1,740 acres (700 ha) (i.e. open to public)
- Operator: Rancho Simi Recreation and Park District
- Status: Open

Las Llajas (pronounced YAH huhs) Canyon within the Marr Ranch Parkland contains the 1920s residential subdivision called Marrland and the surrounding open space area administrated by the Rancho Simi Recreation and Park District (RSRPD) and is located in northeastern Simi Valley, CA. The Las Llajas and nearby Chivo Canyons are parts of the Marr Ranch Parkland, Marrland residential subdivision, and are situated at the foothills on the south side of the Santa Susana Mountains. It contains panoramic mountain and city views, large oak trees, stream and stream bed, rock formations, barren hillsides and rolling hills. The canyon is visited for recreational activities as rock climbing, biking, hiking, wildlife observation, photography, running, picnicking, and horseback riding. It has smooth footing with many sandy sections and a green creek-bed. It also includes a 46-acre dam that was intended for creation a recreational lake in the 1970s. Now called the Las Llajas Canyon Debris Basin.

The place name was first used in 1931. It is likely a misspelling of the Spanish las llagas, which translates to "the wounds", and referred to the stigmata of a Roman Catholic saint.

Pisgah Grande was a Christian sect who created a secluded colony in the Llajas Canyon. At one time, the cult had thirty buildings and 150 residents.

== Wildlife ==
Llajas Canyon is home to fauna such as the Mountain lion, California badger, Red-tailed hawk, Ring-tailed cat, Virginia opossum, Gray fox, Coyote, Bobcat, Mule deer, Southern Pacific rattlesnake, and Barn owl. The area was open for Mountain lion hunting as late as in 1934. The flora consists of native shrubs, grasses, California sycamore, numerous oak trees, brush, vines, wildflowers, wild celery, watercress, cactus, palm trees, and more.

== Geography ==
To get to its main entrance, follow the 118 highway to Simi Valley and exit on Yosemite Avenue. Head north on Yosemite Ave. until you get to Evening Sky Drive, where you are going to make a right turn. Continue on Evening Sky Dr. for a quarter mile until you arrive at its main entrance at 5715 Evening Sky Road. There are also numerous other entrances to the trail, for instance 0.5 miles down the street at 3446 Yosemite Avenue. Its trail connects to the Chumash Park, Rocky Peak, Chivo Canyon, and various other trails and public lands, and is also accessible through hiking trails from Chatsworth, Los Angeles.

The canyon dates back to the Eocene Epoch, and there have been many fossil-findings in the area. Llajas Canyon is an arroyo incised in silty and sandy salt-rich marine sediment. The area is vulnerable for landslides and flooding. The term "Llajas" was first used informally for series of fine, conglomerate sand and sandy siltstone underlying the Sespe Formation and outcropping by the end of what is now the mouth of Las Llajas Canyon.

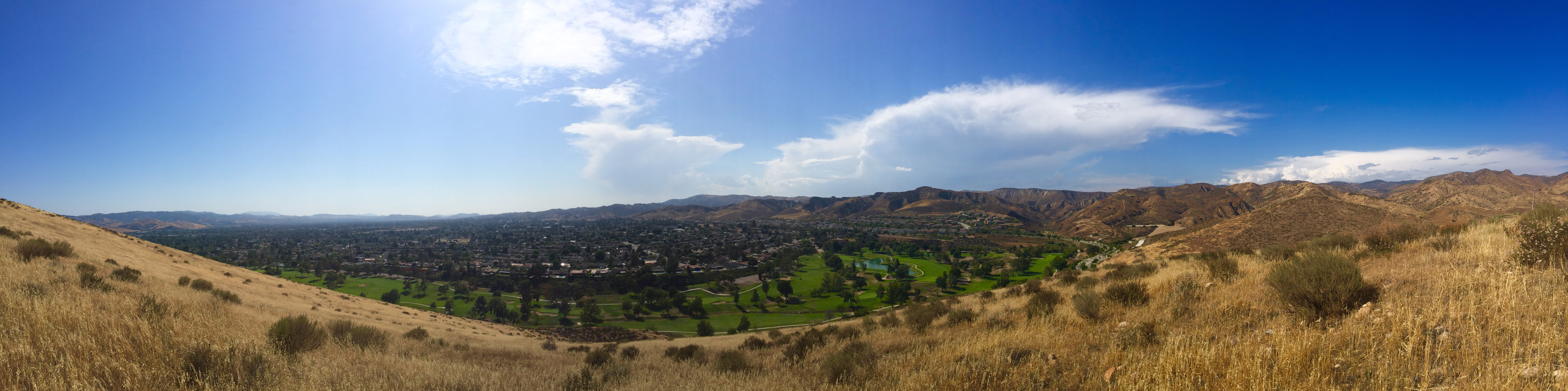
Panoramic view of Simi Valley from Las Llajas Canyon in the northeastern end of town.

== See also ==
- Santa Susana Mountains topics
