= Pisgah, Georgia =

Unincorporated community in Georgia, U.S.

Coordinates: 34°43′31″N 84°16′54″W

Pisgah is an unincorporated community in Gilmer County, in the U.S. state of Georgia.

== History ==
A post office called Pisgah was established in 1887, and remained in operation until 1953. The community was named after Mount Pisgah, a place mentioned in the Hebrew Bible.
