= Mount Pisgah, Georgia =

Unincorporated community in Georgia, U.S.

Coordinates: 34°50′45″N 85°10′45″W

Mount Pisgah is an unincorporated community in Catoosa County, in the U.S. state of Georgia.

== Etymology ==
The community probably took the name of a local church. The name ultimately is derived from Mount Pisgah, a place mentioned in the Hebrew Bible.
