= Mount Pisgah (Lane County, Oregon) =

Summit in Oregon, United States

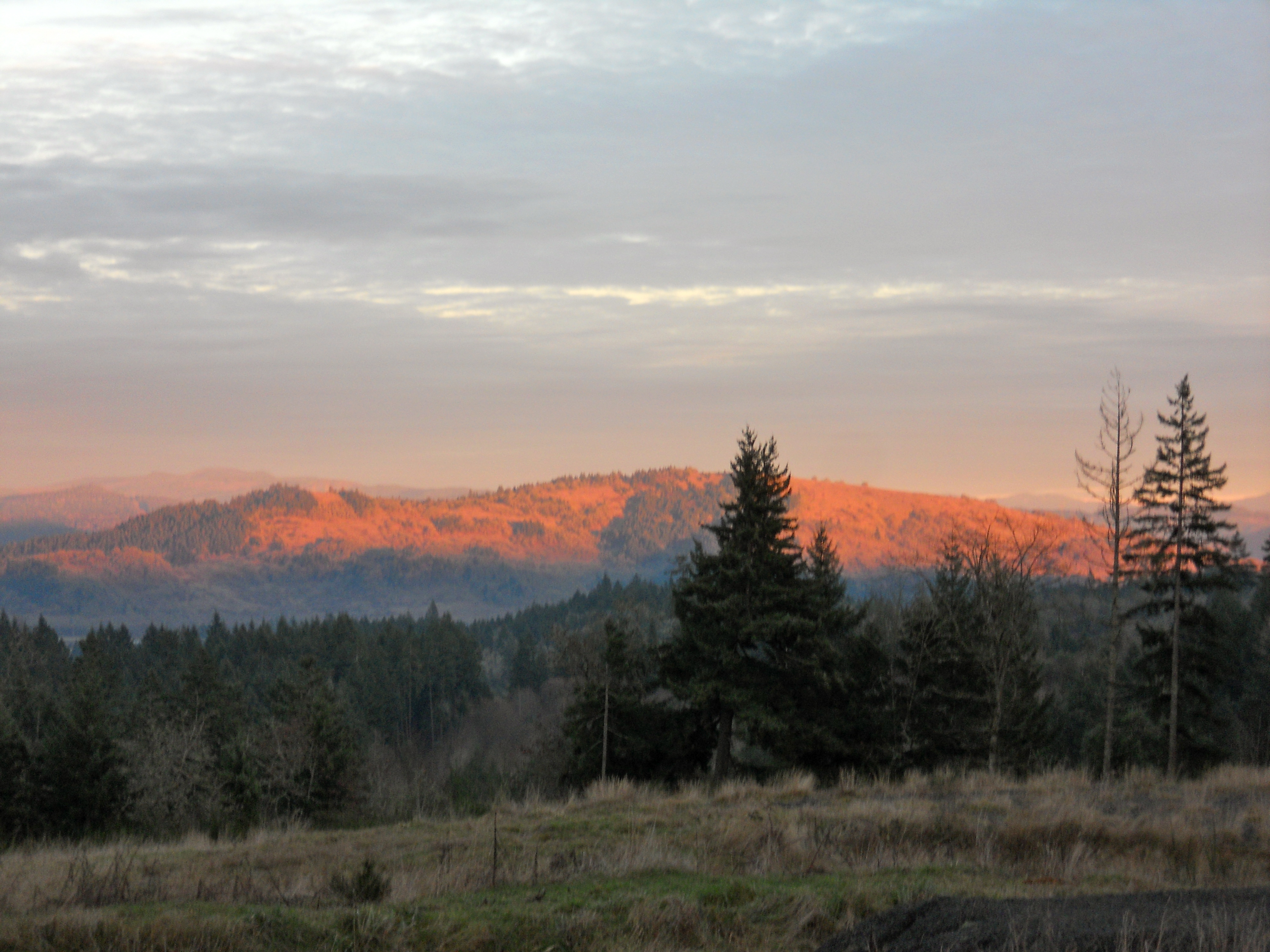
- Mount Pisgah at sunset

Highest point
- Elevation: 1,531 ft (467 m)
- Coordinates: 44°00′50″N 122°57′41″W

Geography
- Location: Lane County, Oregon, U.S.
- Parent range: Cascade Range
- Topo map: USGS Cruso

Geology
- Mountain type: Stratovolcano

Climbing
- Easiest route: Hike

Mount Pisgah is a small mountain (summit) in Lane County, Oregon, United States, rising 1,060 feet (320 m) above the surrounding Willamette Valley to a maximum elevation of 1,531 feet (467 m). It was named after the biblical Mount Pisgah. It is situated between the Coast Fork and Middle Fork of the Willamette River, two miles (3.2 km) southeast of their confluence. Springfield is immediately north of Mount Pisgah, and the city of Eugene is about seven miles (11 km) west. It is the site of the 2,363 acres (956 ha) Howard Buford Recreation Area as well as the non-profit Mount Pisgah Arboretum at its base.

== Geology ==
The hill consists of basalt or its intrusive equivalent diabase. Small crystals of calcite and various zeolite minerals are often seen where the rock outcrops, especially near the summit. Specific minerals found in the area include agate, calcite, heulandite, jasper, malachite, mesolite, and quartz. Mount Pisgah is known for its diverse plant and animal life. The area features a mix of oak savanna, meadows, and woodlands. Wildflowers are abundant during the spring.

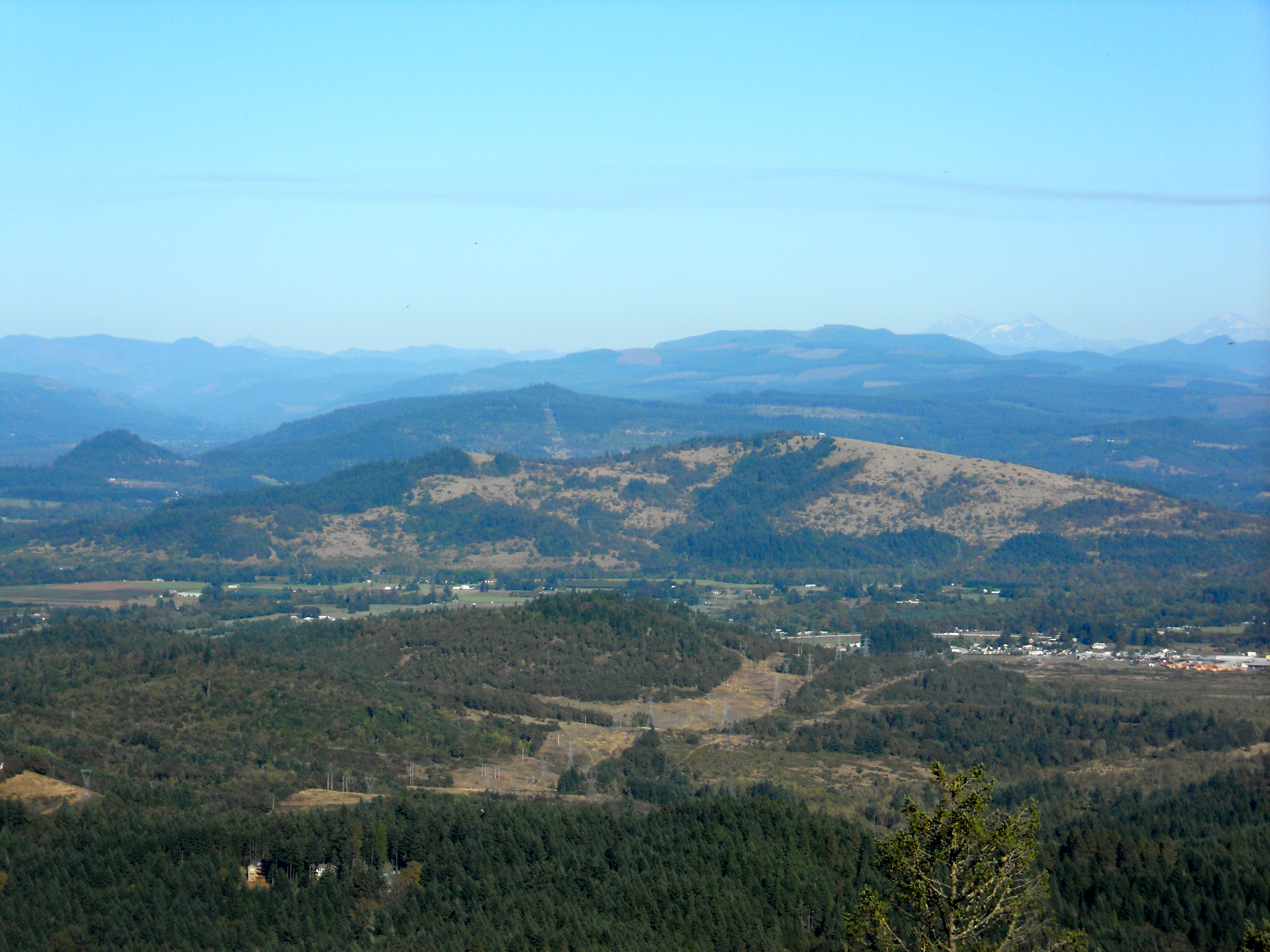
Mount Pisgah from Spencer Butte

== Recreation ==
Several hiking trails are maintained by the Lane County Parks Department on Mount Pisgah. The summit is accessible by a steep 1.4-mile (2.3 km) trail from a parking area near the base of the hill. Several other trails make their way through the adjacent arboretum and up the slopes.

The summit offers a panoramic view of the southern Willamette Valley and includes a bronze relief sculpture (a memorial for Ken Kesey's son Jed) illustrating the surrounding topography and identifying many nearby geographic features.

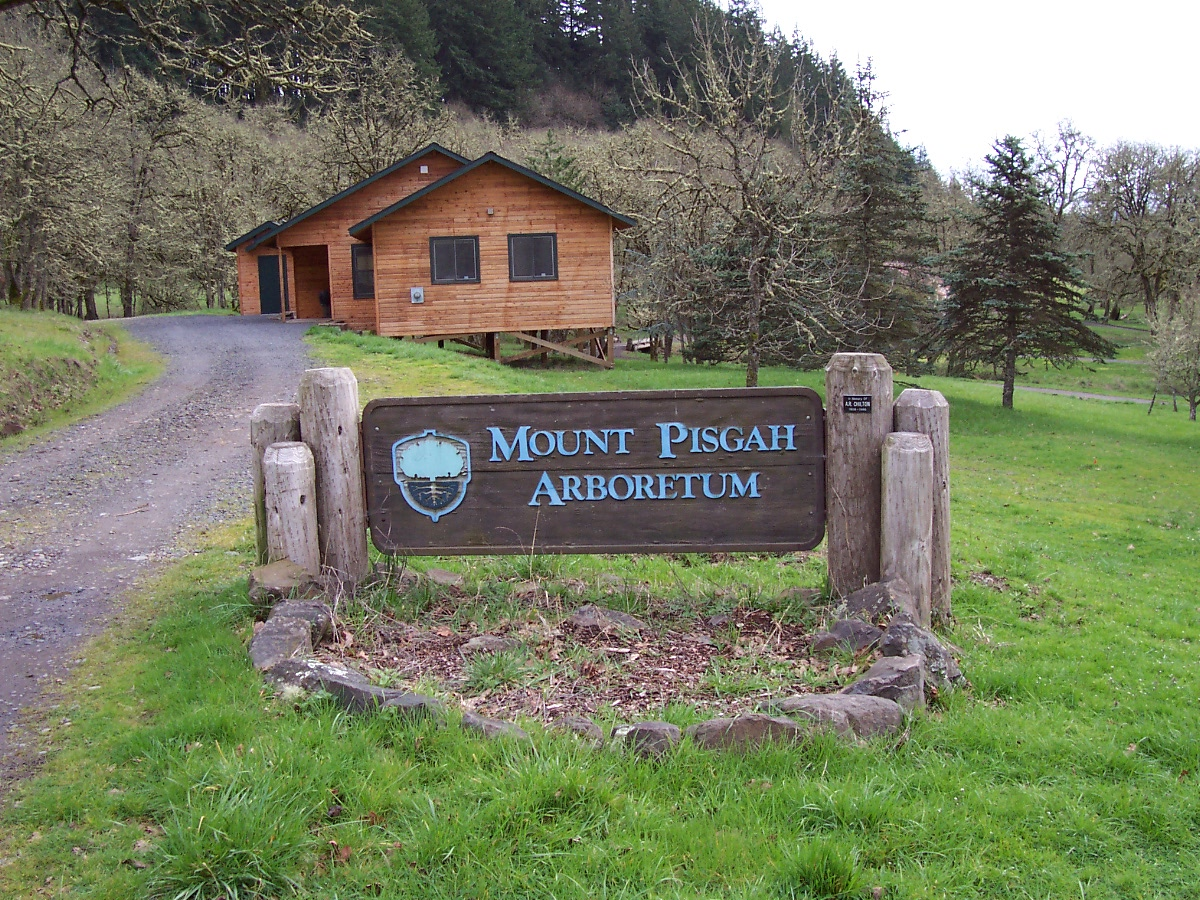
Base of Mt Pisgah

=== Arboretum ===
The Mount Pisgah Arboretum covers 209 acres (0.85 km^{2}) at the base of Mount Pisgah and offers visitors 7 miles (11 km) of trails through natural riverside habitat and hundreds of cataloged plant species. As of May 2020, admission is $5 per car and permits can be purchased at a self-service pay station, card only.

== Willamette Confluence Preserve ==
In 2010, the Wildish Sand and Gravel Company sold its 1,305-acre property at the base of Mount Pisgah to The Nature Conservancy (TNC) for $23.4 million. The property was then renamed as the Willamette Confluence Preserve. As this section of land had been used for gravel extraction, it took over a decade for The Nature Conservancy to restore the native flora and fauna and ready it for controlled public access.

In January 2023, The Nature Conservancy transferred stewardship of the preserve to the McKenzie River Trust for future conservation.
