= Pisgah Home Historic District =

Historic district in California, United States

- U.S. National Register of Historic Places
- U.S. Historic district
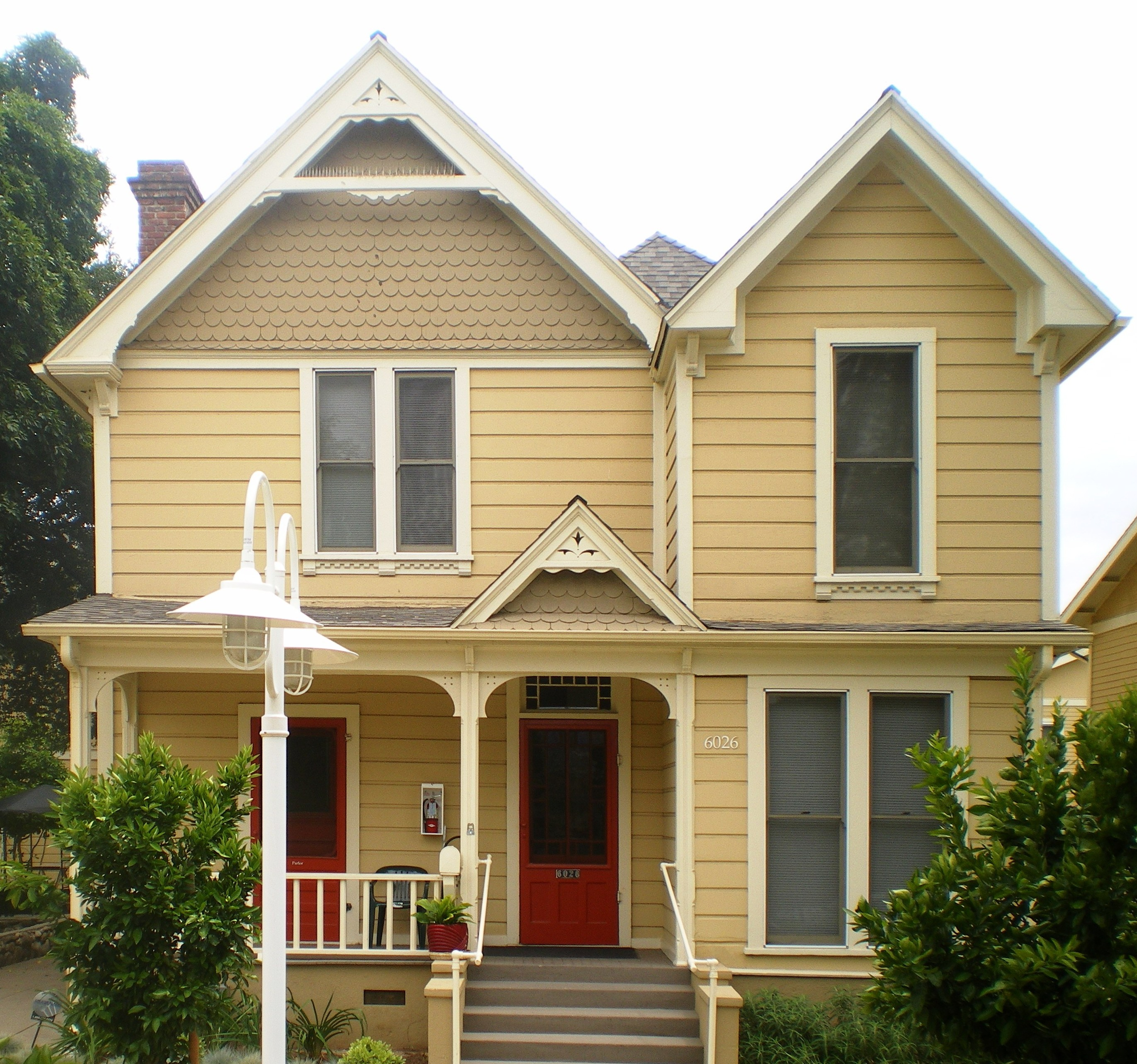
- Pisgah Home, 2008

- Location within Los Angeles
- Location: 6026-6044 Echo St. & 6051 A-D Hayes St., Highland Park, Los Angeles, California
- Coordinates: 34°6′38″N 118°11′12″W
- Built: 1895
- Architectural style: Mission/Spanish Revival, Bungalow/Craftsman
- NRHP reference No.: 07001304
- Added to NRHP: December 19, 2007

Pisgah Home Historic District is a historic district in the Highland Park neighborhood of Los Angeles, California. It was the site of the Pisgah Home movement begun by faith healer and social reformer, Finis E. Yoakum, in the early 1900s. The site is closely aligned with the founding of the modern Pentecostal church. It has been a mission used for religious and charitable purposes for more than 100 years. The area today is operated as the Christ Faith Mission/Old Pisgah Home.

== Finis E. Yoakum ==
Finis Yoakum (1851–1920), the founder of the Pisgah Home movement, began his career as a medical doctor specializing in mental and neurological disorders and serving as the chair of mental disease on the faculty of Gross Medical College in Denver, Colorado. In July 1894, Yoakum was badly injured when he was struck by a buggy. He moved to Los Angeles in 1895, hoping the mild climate would assist in his recuperation. After attending a Christian Alliance prayer meeting in 1895, Yoakum recovered and considered his healing to be a miracle. He later wrote that he received visions telling him to create a mission for the needy.

=== Gold mining ===
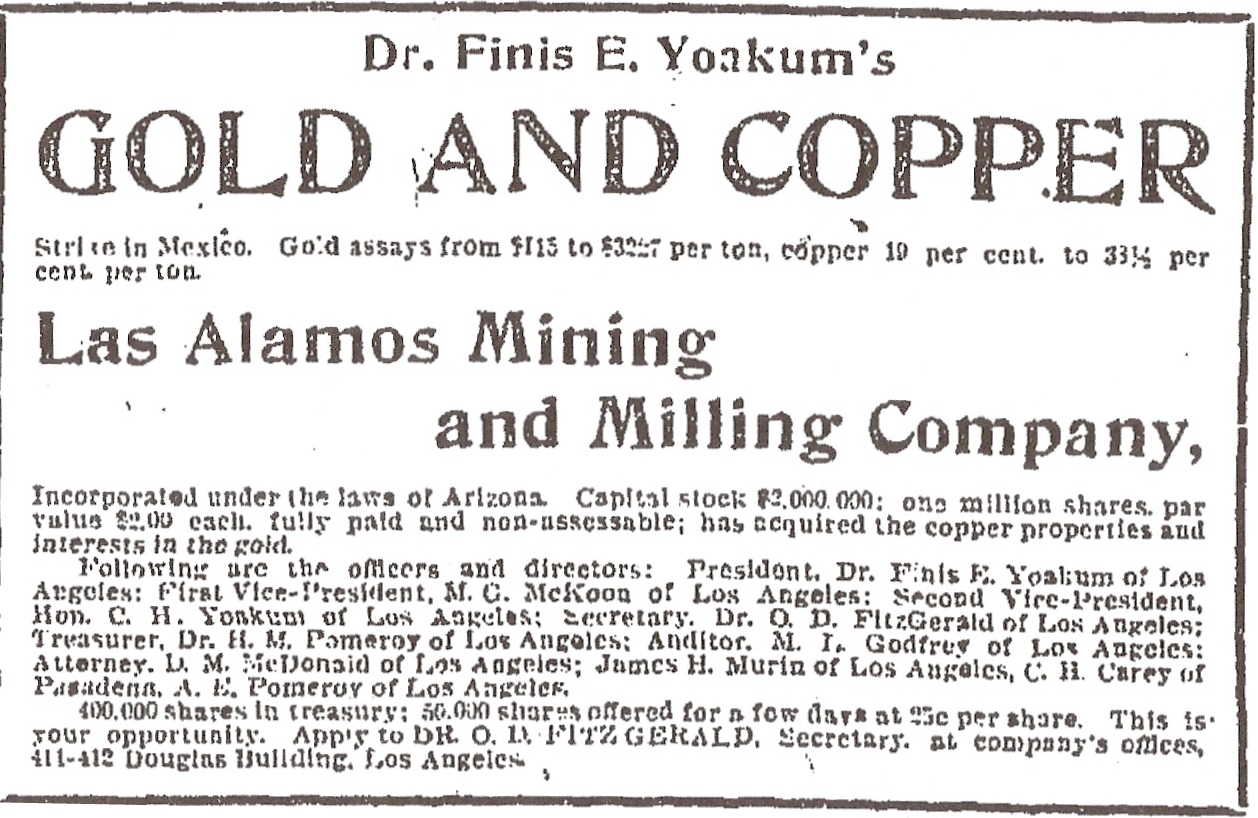
Advertisement for stock in Yoakum's gold-mining business, Los Angeles Times, March 12, 1902

Though he began his mission around 1900, he continued to have other business interests as well. One of those interests was gold mining. In 1897, the Los Angeles Times published an article on Yoakum's claim that he had discovered a new method of "X-Ray Prospecting" for gold. Yoakum reported that he had laid a bit of gold-bearing quartz on the x-ray plate while taking an x-ray of a patient with a tumor. The x-ray showed the location of the gold deposits in the quartz, and Yoakum proposed using x-rays in mine tunnels to "ascertain decisively if gold is present, and if so, exactly where it lies and in what quantities." Following this report, Yoakum became active in gold and copper mining. In 1902, he ran a newspaper advertisement (pictured at left) offering stock at 25 cents a share in his new mining company. Yoakum later claimed that it was while traveling in Mexico, the location of his mining interests, that he spoke for the first time in tongues. He reported: "I was in the heart of Mexico in a church, speaking through an interpreter to the Mexicans and Indians, when suddenly a distinct rush of some might wind came upon me, and when I opened my mouth it was not English, but a beautiful smooth Castilian language, and for 20 or 30 minutes I held that large audience."

== Pisgah Home movement ==
Around 1900, Yoakum formed an institution that was initially known as Yoakum's Sanatorium at his house in the Highland Park section of Los Angeles. The home originally had room for only eight persons and was founded "to give free care to drunkards and outcasts who wished to reform." In March 1903, the Los Angeles Times reported that Yoakum was building a cottage to the north of his "Faith home" and had plans for a series of cottages for the use of patients at his sanatorium. In June 1903, the Times reported that proposed additions to Yoakum's sanatorium would increase the capacity from 50 to 150 patients. Some patients stayed in the main home, others stayed in the cottages, and others still stayed in tents and wagons on the property.

By 1903, Yoakum's Sanatorium had become the "Pisgah Faith Home", named after the mountain peak from which the Bible indicates that Moses first saw the promised land. Yoakum used his barn as a tabernacle for church services and also as additional living space for patients. Yoakum and the Pisgah Home movement became well-known not only in Los Angeles but nationally and internationally. The Pisgah Home was supported by voluntary offerings, and no specific charges were made for care or treatment. As Yoakum's fame spread, donations came in from all over the world to support its operations. The inmates (as they were known) were fed simple home-cooked meals, instructed on the Bible, then bathed and put to work around the home. Among the tasks given to the residents was the construction of a lavish Tudor-style mansion which became Yoakum's new home at 140 South Avenue 59, and has itself been designated a historic landmark.

In 1952, the Los Angeles Times described the origins of the Pisgah Home movement:

"He (Yoakum) walked the back streets, among the down-and-outers, calling on them to give themselves to Christ. One by one at first, and then in droves, society's outcasts heeded and followed the fervent doctor with the white hair and trimly clipped white beard. Drunkards and cripples, paupers and habitual criminals—he befriended them all, and to them he preached the love of God."

A more recent newspaper account described the origins of Pisgah Home this way:

"The property, first known as Yoakum's Sanatorium, came to look like a tent city, offering a vegetarian diet and ample portions of the Gospel. Followers erected the tents, bungalows and other buildings next to his Queen Anne-style home, where he and his wife, Mary, continued to live. His barn became a church lined with beds. Yoakum was an early leader in the Pentecostal movement, which began in L.A. in 1906. By then, his home was already a mecca for 'foot-sore' hobos and the downtrodden."

By 1913, whole families were living at various Pisgah Home facilities. A newspaper reported on a trip to Redondo Beach by the Pisgah Home residents: "Sweet-faced old women, bent with age and crippled with rheumatism, sat side by side yesterday with tiny tots, all from the Pisgah Home, and enjoyed with them for the first time the thrills of a ride on the Lightning Racer. ... The occasion was a picnic given to the inmates of the Pisgah Home which includes the Pisgah Home for Reformed Drunkards, The Ark for Homeless Girls, the Pisgah Orphanage, and the Pisgah Gardens, and a Home for Destitute Consumptives."

=== Relations with neighbors of the Pisgah Home ===
Yoakum reportedly had his followers distribute nickels to indigents on skid row, a sum that would permit them to ride the train to the station near Pisgah Home. As the crowds of "down and outs" continued to come to Pisgah Home, the movement drew the enmity of neighbors. And indeed, Yoakum's flock was the source of some crime in the area. In 1912, two of the "inmates" from Pisgah Home were arrested for the attempted robbery of a safe at a nearby business. In 1913, Halstead "Billy" Stiles, claiming to be a reformed gunslinger who was part of the James-Younger Gang when it attempted the Northfield, Minnesota bank robbery, moved into the Pisgah Home. Stiles' story was published in the Pisgah publication (with a reported circulation of 100,000), in which he wrote: "My soul was black with many a crime, but he Lord took me and washed me as white as wool. I was not reformed, but transformed." Later still, a large crowd assembled when boxing champion and accused murderer Kid McCoy (one of several men credited as the subject of the expression the "real McCoy") came to Pisgah Home "under heavy guard" to visit his mother, a resident. Other problems included elderly inmates wandering off in a "dazed condition" from the home. The Highland Park News-Herald reported in the late 1910s about the parade of people flowing to Pisgah Home:

"It may be that some Sunday afternoon has found you in a spirit of criticism or pity for these poor deluded people ... From every direction you see them coming—in wheel-chairs, on crutches, stumbling in blindness, tottering with age, bent with burdens, painted with sin, stamped with greed ..."

Complaints from his Highland Park neighbors were reportedly among the reasons for Yoakum's development of the remote Pisgah Grande community in the Santa Susana Mountains.

=== Faith healing ===
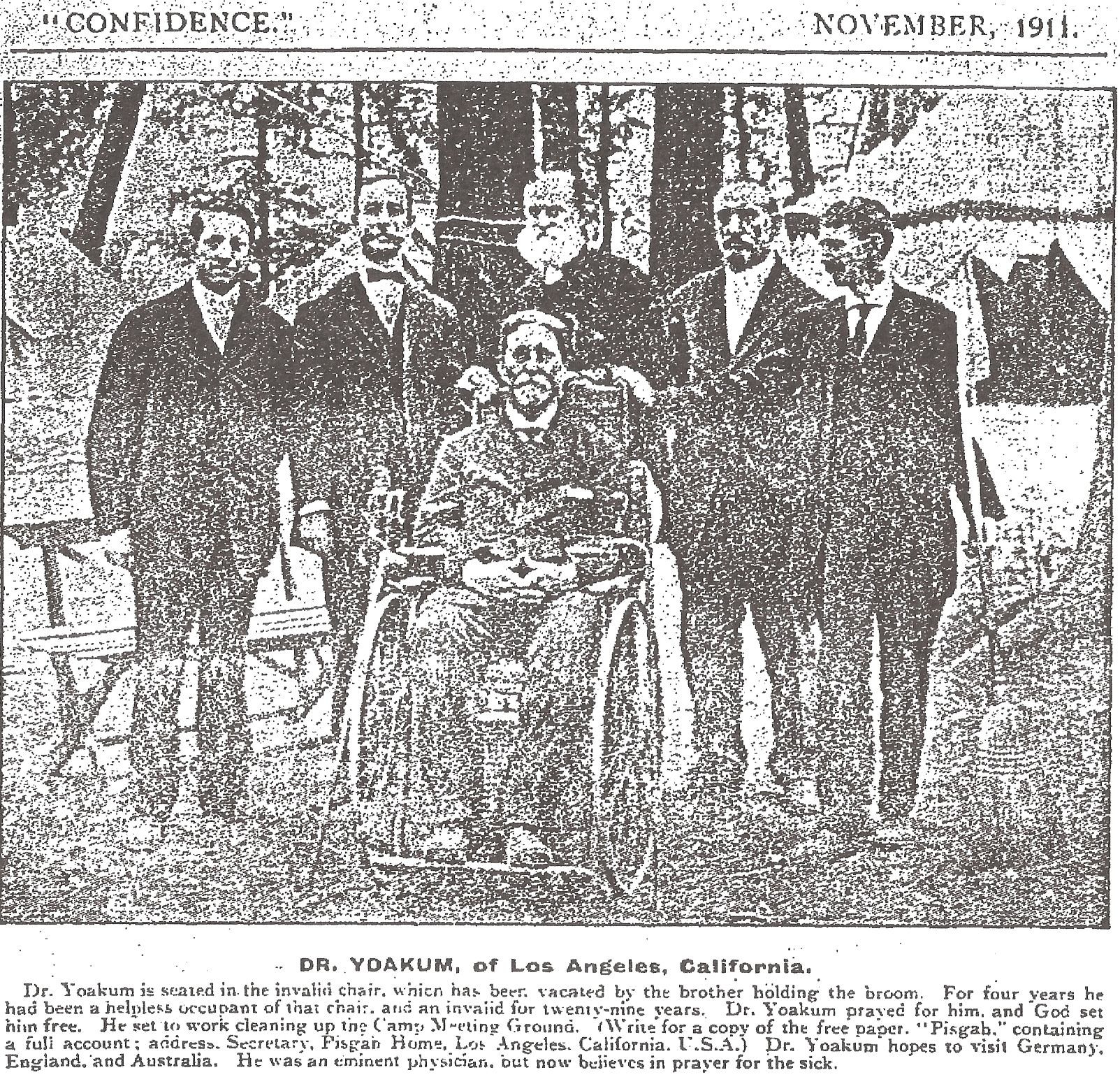
Finis Yoakum posing in wheelchair with former invalid following healing, Nov. 1911

Much of the publicity and funding for the Pisgah Home movement came from Yoakum's work as a faith healer and an early Pentecostal evangelist, traveling to many locations in California, the Eastern United States and Europe. His work as a healer received praise in many religious publications, and a secular writer noted that some of the lame and blind who came to Pisgah Home "left wheel chairs, crutches, braces, and canes to be hung in impressive testimony along the walls."

Other secular writers questioned Yoakum's faith healing practices. As early as 1903, Yoakum claimed his movement had performed some 800 healings, and the Los Angeles Times described Yoakum as the "leading apostle of the 'faith-healing' movement in this city." However, the Times noted discrepancies in the dates and circumstances of the "healings" under the headline "Pouring Oil on the Sick ... Stories Don't Jibe." In 1909, the Los Angeles Times published a lengthy article criticizing Yoakum's tactics. The article, titled "No Miracles Without Cash: Services Halt While Money Is Collected," described events at one of the healing services held at Pisgah Home. The Times opened by quoting the Pisgah Home motto: "God loves a cheerful giver." It then described a "Healing and Testimony of the Healed" service:

"Collection boxes were placed on the grounds about the home and in the tabernacle, and an extra large one was on the platform, where Dr. Yoakum and his assistants perform their miracles. A large audience was present, but the sight alone of the collection boxes did not draw the dollars quite fast enough for the doctor, so the testimony service was stopped long enough for him to tell how necessary it is for one to give away all his money before entering the kingdom of heaven. Dr. Yoakum said that he performs such miracles as mentioned in the Bible, but that the one-tenth of a person's income for the purposes of the Lord was entirely too small, and that every one should give all their money to God's servants, or rather servant. After his talk the large box was placed on the front of the platform with the simple statement that there were several more at hand should one not prove large enough to hold all. This admonition opened the persons of many and soon the space around the platform was crowded with cheerful givers, many of whom looked as though they needed the money at home. ... Dr. Yoakum said: 'If you have a debt to pay, do not hoard your money in trying to pay it and be a tight-wad, but give it for God's work and he will find a way for you to get along.'"

The Times article also raised questions about the validity of Yoakum's "healings." They reported that, when an aged blind man began hobbling toward the platform, Yoakum hurriedly had the man seated with a statement that he "had not time during the meeting, but would see the patient privately." Yoakum also sold blessed handkerchiefs for $5. A newspaper account of Yoakum's 1909 healing event in Pomona, California noted: "A special feature of the meeting was the praying over handkerchiefs to be sent to the sick and laid upon their persons." The healing power of the handkerchiefs was reported in the Pisgah newsletter, and soon believers across the country were sending in $5 for a healing handkerchief.

Controversy over Yoakum's healings continued even after his death. In the late 1920s, a man sued Yoakum's estate to collect a $3,300 loan made to Yoakum as consideration for driving a demon from the man's invalid daughter. The litigation resulted in two published cases, including a decision of the California Supreme Court, Mix v. Yoakum, 200 Cal. 681 (1927), and Mix v. Yoakum, 138 Cal. App. 290 (1934).

=== Pisgah Home expands ===
As the Pisgah Home movement became successful, Yoakum built other facilities. Pisgah Ark was built in Arroyo Seco where "wayward girls" and prostitutes were sheltered and taught midwifery under the direction of Sister Nell. Pisgah Gardens was built in North Hollywood, where beds were maintained for 100 patients who had tuberculosis, cancer, and mental disorders. Yoakum also built the Pisgah Store in Arroyo Seco where donated clothing and other goods were distributed free of charge. There was also a gospel mission in West Los Angeles. In the late 1910s, a local newspaper described the breadth of services provided by Pisgah Home:

"Its door is ever open any hour, day or night, to receive the poor, needy, homeless, the drunkard, fallen, or outcast. Across the Arroyo, the 'Ark' makes a home for rescued women and girls. Nearby is the 'Workers' Home,' and the 'Store,' over whose counter no money has ever passed in the five years of its existence. Voluntary contributions keep its supply ever ready for the needs of the many people who apply. Eighteen or twenty miles (32 km) away are the 'Gardens,' 24 acres (97,000 m^{2}) of fruit, vegetable and farm land near Lankershim, with 100 acres (0.40 km^{2}) under cultivation. Here a hundred more are gathered, a colony of consumptives fighting their way back to health, a group of epileptics and feeble minded, and an orphanage for 'nameless' and homeless children. Apricot, plum and peach trees furnish fruit which is dried by the ton, and cannery preserves much of the fruit which, together with other products, is distributed to the poor, 'without money and without price.'"

By 1914, Pisgah Home had outgrown its facilities, and Yoakum bought a 3,300 ranch in the Santa Susana Mountains north of Simi Valley, California. Yoakum paid $50,000 for the property, and there he built Pisgah Grande, a residential and religious utopian community that has since been reclaimed by nature.

== Later uses of the property ==
Fifteen days before his death in August 1920, Yoakum executed deeds to his two sons of all his real property and also executed a will leaving his estate in trust for the Pisgah Home movement. The Pisgah Home movement sued Yoakum's two sons claiming that the real property had been conveyed to the sons to be held in trust for the movement. The lawsuit was ultimately settled with the properties being divided between the family and the movement. The original Pisgah Home in Highland Park continued to be operated as a mission. In 1936, the home was taken over by Arglee F. Green, known as Mother Green, of Christ Faith Mission; Mother Green used it as a shelter for homeless women and children. From 1950 to 1993, Pisgah Home was operated by the Rev. Harold James Smith; Smith published the "Herald of Hope" newspaper (with a reported circulation of 60,000) from the Pisgah Home and his "Prayer Tower" radio broadcasts also emanated from the Pisgah Home property. Since 1993, the property, known as Christ Faith Mission/Old Pisgah Home, has been directed by Richard A. Kim as its Administrator and chief executive officer.

== Historic designation ==
In 1994, the City of Los Angeles adopted a historic preservation overlay zone around Pisgah Home. In 2000, the Pisgah Home received a preservation grant from the Getty Trust, and in December 2007, the Pisgah Home Historic District was listed in the National Register of Historic Places.

== See also ==
- List of Registered Historic Places in Los Angeles
- Highland Park
