= Pisgah Grande =

Pentecostal Christian community the United States

Coordinates: 34.3284°N 118.6407°W

Pisgah Grande (1914-1920) was a Pentecostal Christian community in Las Llajas Canyon north of Simi Valley founded by Dr. Finis E. Yoakum. In 1920 his successor, James Cheek, moved the colony to Pikesville, Tennessee.

Dr. Yoakum had experienced a spiritual awakening and decided to devote his life to religious pursuits after a miraculous recovery from a carriage accident in 1895 in Denver. He relocated to Los Angeles where he founded several charitable enterprises named Pisgah, after the peak in the Sinai from which Moses saw the promised land. Beside Pisgah Grande there was Pisgah Home in the Highland Park section of Los Angeles, Pisgah Store, Pisgah Ark, a recovery house for women, and Pisgah Gardens, a rehabilitative center, orphanage, and farm in North Hollywood.

Associated with the Christ Faith Mission of Highland Park, Pisgah Grande served as a mission and a rehabilitation center for the poor and destitute of Los Angeles and other nearby areas.

At one point the community had 300 members and its own post office.
