= Mt. Pisgah State Park =

1,302-acre Pennsylvania state park

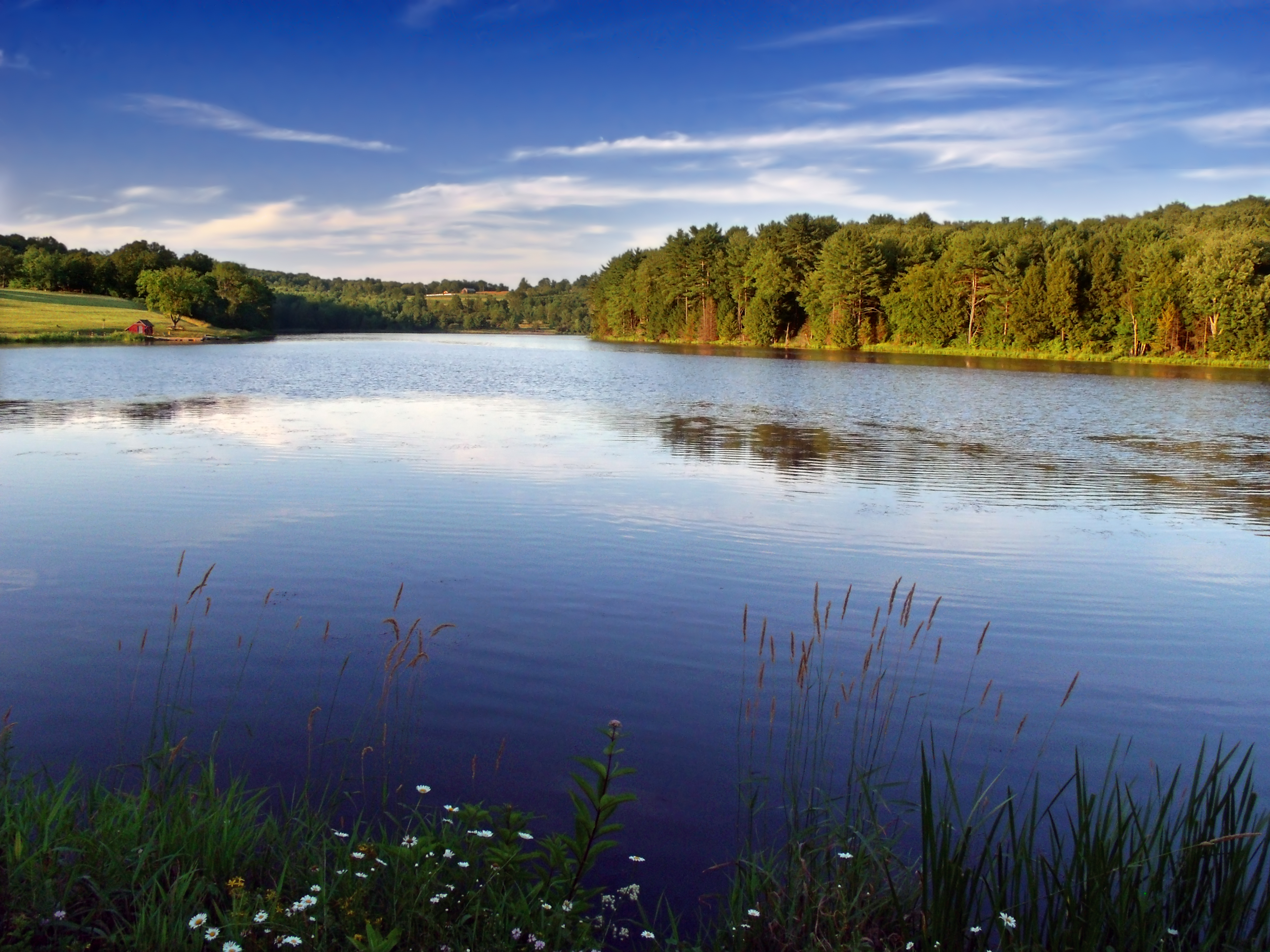

- Location within Pennsylvania Location within the United States
- Interactive map of Mt. Pisgah State Park
- Location: Bradford County, Pennsylvania, United States
- Coordinates: 41°48′22″N 76°40′08″W
- Area: 1,302 acres (527 ha)
- Elevation: 1,224 feet (373 m)
- Established: 1979
- Administrator: Pennsylvania Department of Conservation and Natural Resources
- Website: Official website
- Pennsylvania State Parks

Mt. Pisgah State Park is a 1,302-acre (527 ha) Pennsylvania state park in Smithfield, Springfield, Troy and West Burlington townships, Bradford County, Pennsylvania in the United States. The park is located almost exactly halfway between Troy and Towanda, along Pennsylvania State Route 3019, near U.S. Route 6, at the base of Mt. Pisgah. The park is bordered by Mill Creek, Mt. Pisgah County Park and State Game Land 289. Mill Creek which flows through the park has been dammed and forms Stephen Foster Lake a 75-acre (30 ha) man-made lake.

== History ==
The land on which Mt. Pisgah State Park is located was not settled permanently until the early 19th century. The first settlers migrated from New England. They cleared the land of its dense old-growth forest of pine and hardwood trees for farming. The stumps were stacked in fence rows, which still form the boundary of some of the old fields in the park. The land was used primarily for farming until 1969 when it was purchased by the Commonwealth of Pennsylvania. Stephen Foster Lake, named for the famed composer and former resident of Tioga County, was formed by damming Mill Creek in 1977. Mt. Pisgah State Park was opened to the public in 1979.

== Recreation ==
=== Stephen Foster Lake ===
Stephen Foster Lake is open to boating, fishing, ice fishing, and ice skating. Gas powered boats are not permitted on the lake. Electric powered and non powered boats must have proper registration with any state. The boat launch is on the northern shore near a dock, restrooms, parking and a boat renting concessionaire. Anglers will find perch, bass, crappie and bluegill in Stephen Foster Lake. Ice fishing is permitted but only when the ice is at least 4 inches (10 cm) thick. The thickness of the ice is monitored at the boat launch and fishing dock. Ice skating is permitted in the monitored areas.

=== Hunting ===
Hunting is permitted on about 1,100 acres (450 ha) of Mount Pisgah State Park. Hunters are expected to follow the rules and regulations of the Pennsylvania State Game Commission. The common game species are ruffed grouse, squirrels, turkey, white-tailed deer and rabbits. The hunting of groundhogs is prohibited. Hunting is permitted on the adjacent State Game Land 289.

=== Swimming ===
The swimming pool is open on weekends beginning Memorial Day weekend through mid-June when the schools in Pennsylvania are closed for the summer. Following the dismissal of school, the pool is open daily until mid-August when school begins. From mid-August until Labor Day weekend, the pool is open only on the weekends. The pool closes for the season at the conclusion of Labor Day weekend. The hours of operation are 11:00 am until 7:00 pm. Lifeguards are on duty when the pool is open.

=== Picnics ===
The picnic area overlooks the lake near the swimming pool. It is partially wooded and visitors may choose between sunny or shaded picnic areas. There is a sand volleyball court and horseshoe pit near the picnic area.
