= Mount Pisgah (Victoria) =

Mountain in Victoria, Australia

Coordinates: 37°27′46″S 143°49′05″E

Mount Pisgah is a small volcanic lava dome 11 km from Ballarat, Victoria, Australia. The name derives from the summit of the Biblical Mount Nebo, from which Moses first saw the Promised Land (Deuteronomy 34:1–4).

The Djadjawurrung and Wathawurrung name for the mount is Morambulbuledj. It is 559 metres (1,834 ft) above sea level.

The Dowling Forest (Ballarat) Racecourse is located at the base of Mount Pisgah. In 2009, plans were revealed to build a 1,400-metre (4,600 ft) uphill training track on the side of the mountain.
