= Mount Pisgah (York County, Pennsylvania) =

Mountain in Pennsylvania, United States

Coordinates: 39°59′44″N 76°32′58″W

Mt. Pisgah

Highest point
- Elevation: 865 ft (264 m)
- Prominence: 500 ft (150 m)

Geography
- Location: York County, Pennsylvania, U.S.
- Parent range: Piedmont (United States)
- Topo map: USGS Red Lion (PA) 7.5-minute Quadrangle

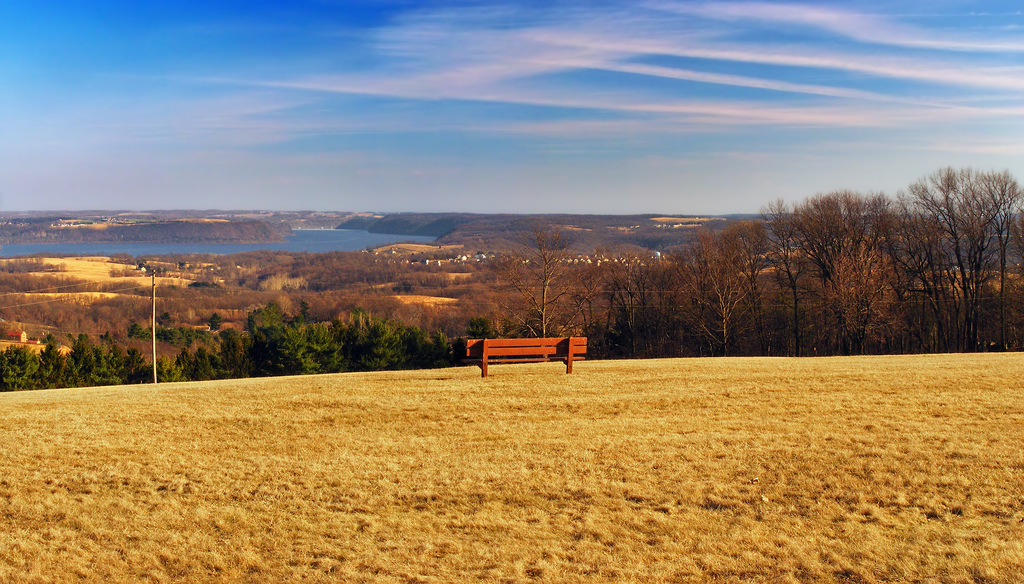
South-to-southeast view of the Susquehanna River Valley, Samuel S. Lewis State Park

Mount Pisgah is a peak in York County, Pennsylvania situated south-southwest of Wrightsville.

== Location ==
Mt. Pisgah is an 865-foot piece of rising ground that overlooks the Susquehanna River south of Wrightsville, standing about 500 feet above the surrounding rural landscape and providing wide-ranging views of the lower Susquehanna Valley. Samuel S. Lewis State Park is situated on Mt. Pisgah. On clear days, visitors can see as far as Governor Dick Hill, about 18 miles away.

== Name ==
Mt. Pisgah is named for the biblical mountain in Jordan from which Moses first saw the promised land.

== Geology ==
Mt. Pisgah's view is an excellent place to gain knowledge of some effects of geology and topography on the economic development of this part of Pennsylvania. The landscape near Mt. Pisgah is developed on complexly folded and faulted metamorphic rocks that range in age from Precambrian to Ordovician (600 to 450 mya). These metamorphic rocks were originally sedimentary strata such as sandstones, conglomerates, limestones, dolomites, and shales that formed in near shore and shallow marine environments. The high pressures and temperatures of a mountain-building event (450 mya) along with deep burial caused recrystallization of the rocks into slates, phyllites, and schists. Periods of folding and faulting along with erosion and intermittent uplift occurred for hundreds of millions of years to form the present landscape. The Chickies Formation, a resistant rock unit composed mostly of quartzite, underlies Mt. Pisgah.
