= Mount Pisgah (Bradford County, Pennsylvania) =

Mountain in Pennsylvania, United States

Coordinates: 41.80984°N 76.71591°W

Mt. Pisgah

Highest point
- Elevation: 2,260 ft (690 m)
- Prominence: 1,000 ft (300 m)

Geography
- Location: Bradford County, Pennsylvania, U.S.
- Parent range: Appalachian Mountains
- Topo map: USGS East Troy (PA) Quadrangle

Mt. Pisgah is a peak that is located in northeastern Pennsylvania's Glaciated Low Plateau region, also known as the Endless Mountains. This mountain peak lies next to a state park named after the mountain, Mt. Pisgah State Park. There is a hiking trail to the summit that has a view of the surrounding countryside, 1,000 feet (305 m) feet below. Stephen Foster lake is also located at the base of the mountain.

== History and notable features ==
Mt. Pisgah is named for the biblical mountain in Jordan from which Moses first saw the promised land. During the late 19th century, this mountain was a favorite summer resort for those from eastern cities, even as far away as Chicago. Visitors were able to stay on a mountaintop hotel, which featured a 100-foot observation tower. The views from the tower looked over the bucolic Pennsylvania landscape.

Today none of those amenities on the summit exist but the views from the top are still sublime and attract hikers and nature lovers.

The summit today offers mainly a westerly view. Visible from the viewing platform is Armenia Mountain and further to the west, approximately seventeen miles, are the mountains north of Mansfield in Tioga County. About eight miles away, to the west and southwest, are mountains in the easternmost portion of the Tioga State Forest.
