= Mount Pisgah Arboretum =

Non-profit arboretum and botanical garden in Oregon

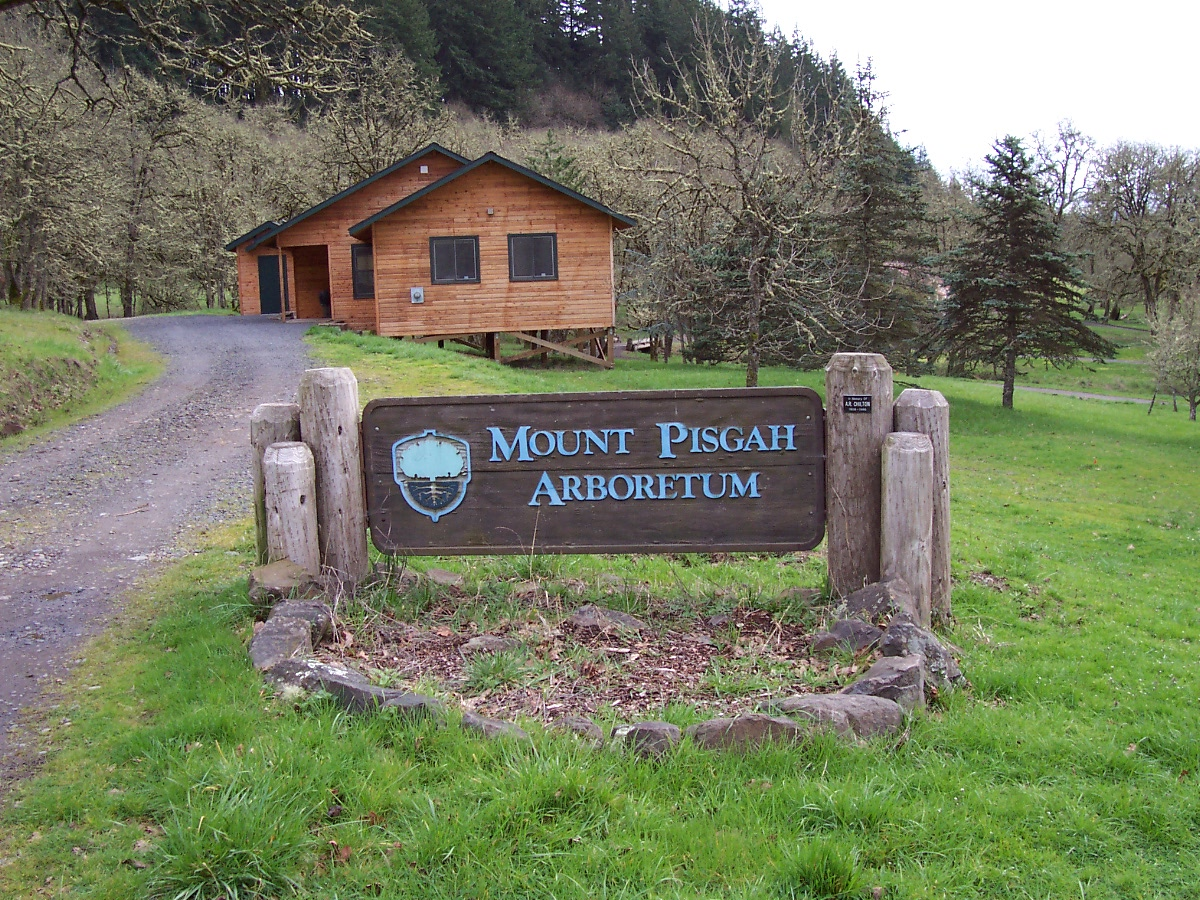
- Mount Pisgah Arboretum sign
- Interactive map of Mount Pisgah Arboretum
- Type: Arboretum
- Location: near Eugene, Oregon, United States
- Area: 209 acres (85 ha)
- Opened: 1973
- Owner: Friends of Mount Pisgah Arboretum
- Status: Open to the public
- Species: 339
- Website: mountpisgaharboretum.org

The Mount Pisgah Arboretum (209 acres (85 ha)) is a non-profit arboretum and botanical garden located within the Howard Buford Recreation Area (2,300 acres (930 ha)), between the Coast Fork of the Willamette River and the slopes of Mount Pisgah near Eugene-Springfield, Oregon, United States.

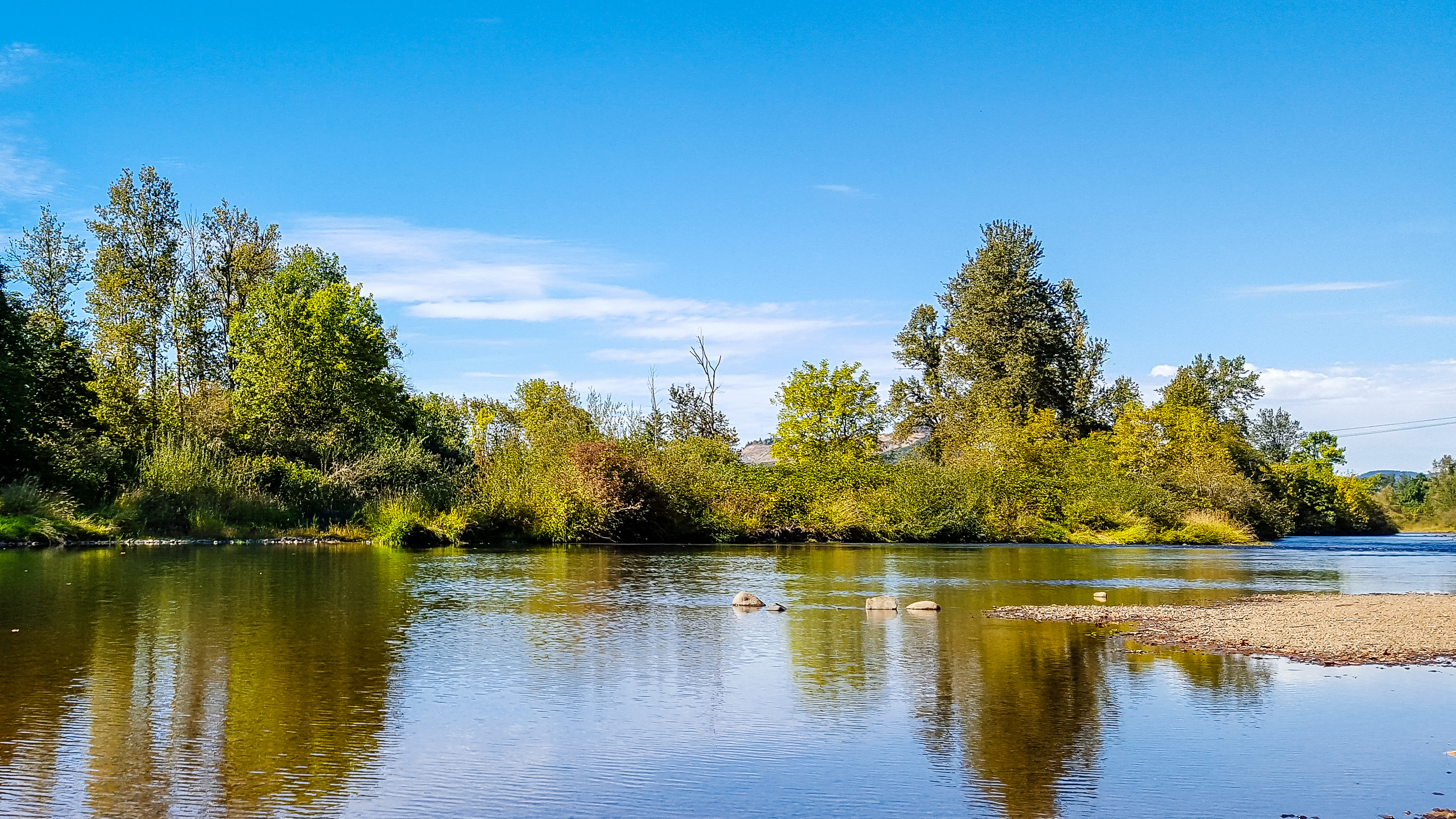
Mt Pisgah Arboretum Willamette River

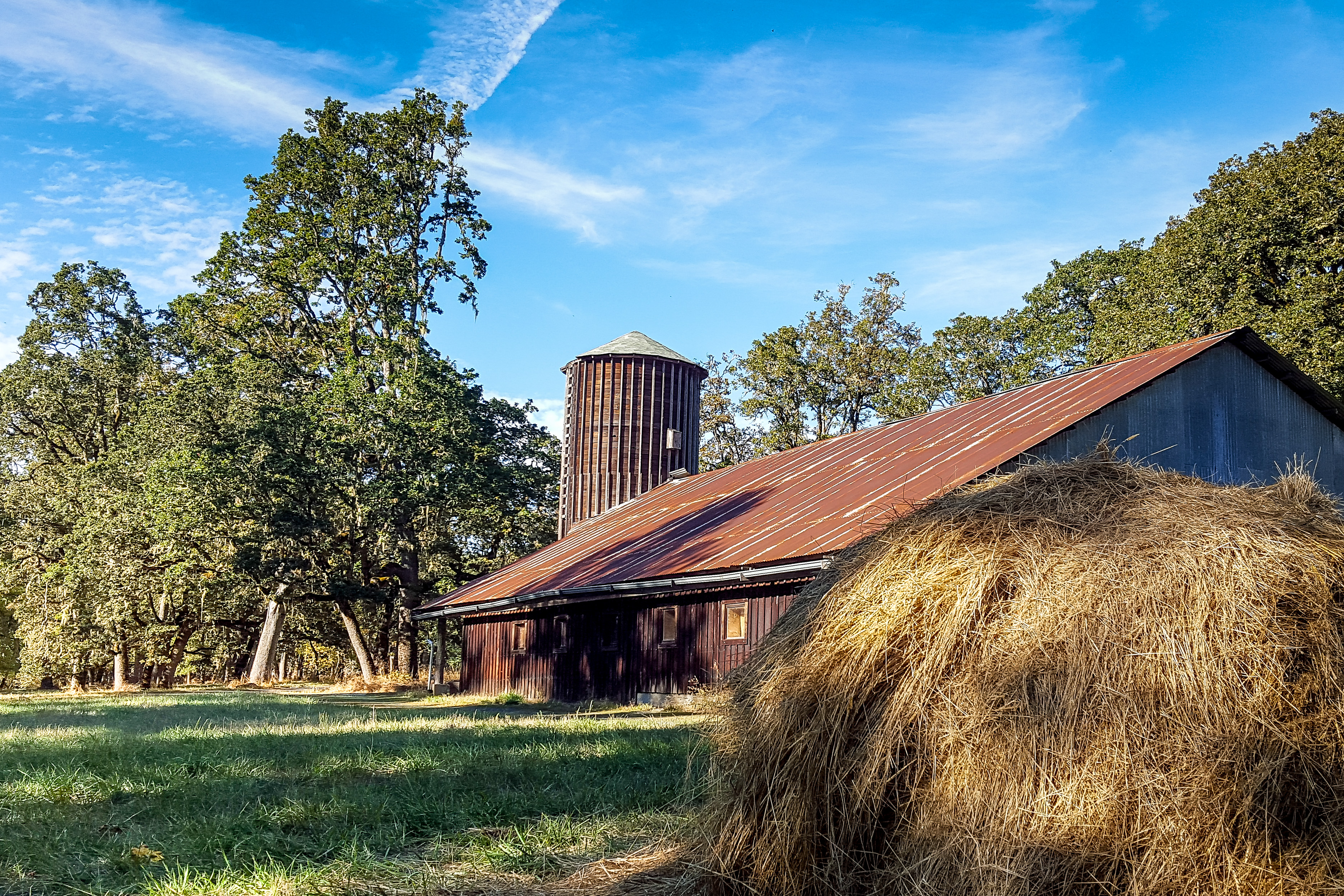
Red Barn Mt Pisgah Arboretum

The Friends of Mount Pisgah Arboretum was established in 1973 when it began to construct trails, build bridges, remove invasive species, and publish newsletters. Wildflower and mushroom shows were first held in 1981; staff hiring began in the early 1980s. The arboretum's original mission was to have international plantings, however most of the early international donations were moved off site. This has changed to maintaining Pacific Northwest plant communities, offer environmental education programs, and provide for public enjoyment of its site.

The arboretum includes 7 miles (11 km) of riverside trails with 23 bridges, riparian meadows, evergreen forests, a rare section of preserved oak savanna, Douglas-fir and incense-cedar forests on hillsides, a water garden, wildflower meadows, a wooded picnic area, and restrooms. The White Oak Pavilion took the place of the deteriorating quonset hut shelter in 2005.

The arboretum's habitats are home to many species of native mosses, lichens, ferns, shrubs, and wildflowers. 67 families, 231 genera, and 339 plant species have been identified on the site. Wildlife includes bats, deer, coyote, foxes, and other small mammals, the endangered western pond turtle, the sensitive species red-legged frog, tree frogs, gopher and garter snakes, and lizards. Birding is a popular activity in the arboretum, which is home to a variety of migratory and resident songbirds, raptors, and waterfowl. The arboretum publishes a bird checklist, as well as a plant checklist, to aid visitors in identifying the local species.

Parking is $5 per car and permits can be purchased at a self-service pay station.

== See also ==
- List of botanical gardens in the United States
