= Mount Pisgah (Bible) =

Mountain referenced in the Bible

Some translators of the biblical book of Deuteronomy translate Pisgah (Hebrew: פִּסְגָּה, pisga) as a name of a mountain, usually referring to Mount Nebo. The word פִּסְגָּה literally means "summit". The region lies directly east of the Jordan River and just northeast of the Dead Sea. Mount Nebo (31° 45.9′ N, 35° 43.1′ E) is the highest among a handful of Pisgah summits; an arid cluster of hilltops on the western edge of the Trans-Jordanian Plateau. Arabic names for Pisgah include: Fasga (Phasga), Jabal Siyāgha (transliterated also as Siaghah/Siâghah/Siyagha/Siyāgha, etc.), Rās as-Siyāgha and Rujm Siyāgha.

== In the Bible ==
In Deuteronomy, God commanded Moses to climb up and view the Promised Land from Mount Nebo:

"Then Moses climbed Mount Nebo from the plains of Moab to the top of Pisgah, across from Jericho. There the LORD showed him the whole land—from Gilead to Dan, all of Naphtali, the territory of Ephraim and Manasseh, all the land of Judah as far as the Mediterranean Sea, the Negev and the whole region from the Valley of Jericho, the City of Palms, as far as Zoar. Then the LORD said to him, 'This is the land I promised on oath to Abraham, Isaac and Jacob when I said, "I will give it to your descendants". I have let you see it with your eyes, but you will not cross over into it.'" (Deuteronomy 34:1–4)

A literal translation of the beginning of this passage from Hebrew into English might run: "Then Moses ascended from the plains of Moab to Mount Nebo, top of the summit ...".

In the Book of Numbers, Chapter 23, Mount Pisgah is listed as one of several locations from which the Moabite King, Balak, tries unsuccessfully to persuade the prophet Balaam to curse Israel:

"So he took him to the field of Zophim on the top of Pisgah, and there he built seven altars and offered a bull and a ram on each altar." (Numbers 23:14, NIV 2011)

== In the Quran ==
The Quran only circumstantially refers to the Deuteronomy events in sura 5 (Al-Ma'ida), ayah 22–26, where Moses's debates with the Israelites near Jericho are mentioned. Both Deuteronomy and the Quran locate Moses's place of death in this region, though they disagree about the fate of his body. The mountain is known as the first location where Moses viewed the promised land as described in the Old Testament.
