= Bogle (surname) =

Bogle is a surname, and may refer to:

- Adam Bogle (1848–1915), British soldier
- Albert Bogle (born 1949), minister of the Church of Scotland
- America Waldo Bogle (1844–1903), American pioneer
- Andrew Cathcart Bogle (1829–1890), Scottish soldier
- Andrew Nisbet Bogle (1868–1957), Scottish minister
- Bob Bogle (1934–2009), American musician
- Christian Bogle (born 2001), American race car driver
- Dick Bogle (1930–2010), American journalist and politician
- Donald Bogle, American writer
- Eric Bogle (born 1944), Australian singer
- Evelyn Bogle, Jamaican cricketer
- George Bogle (diplomat) (1746–1781), Scottish diplomat and adventurer
- George Bogle of Daldowie (1701–1782), Scottish merchant
- James Bogle (born 1959), Australian director and screenwriter
- James Bogle (cricketer) (1893–1963), Australian cricketer
- Jayden Bogle (born 2000), English footballer
- Joanna Bogle, British broadcaster
- John C. Bogle (1929–2019), American businessman
- John Bogle (artist) (c. 1744 – 1803) Scottish painter
- Justin Bogle (born 1981), American chef
- Kathryn Hall Bogle (1906–2008), American social worker and activist
- Khris Bogle (born 2000), American football player
- Mike Bogle (born 1961) American musician
- Omar Bogle (born 1993), English footballer
- Paul Bogle (1822–1865), Jamaican preacher
- Paul Bogle (priest) (born 1957), Dean of Clonmacnoise in the Church of Ireland
- Phil Bogle (born 1979), American footballer
- Richard Arthur Bogle (1835–1904), American pioneer
- Robert Bogle (born 1943), Canadian politician
- Robert W. Bogle, American journalist
- Sandi Bogle, English television personality
- Sarah Bogle (1870–1932), American librarian
- Thomas A. Bogle Jr. (1890–1955), American football player and coach
- Warren Bogle (born 1946), American baseball player
- W. C. Fields (1880–1946), American comedian who used the pseudonym Charles Bogle

== See also ==
- Bogle (dancer) (1964–2005), Jamaican dancer and choreographer
- Bogle (disambiguation)
