= Obed Dickinson =

Oregon pioneer (1818–1892)

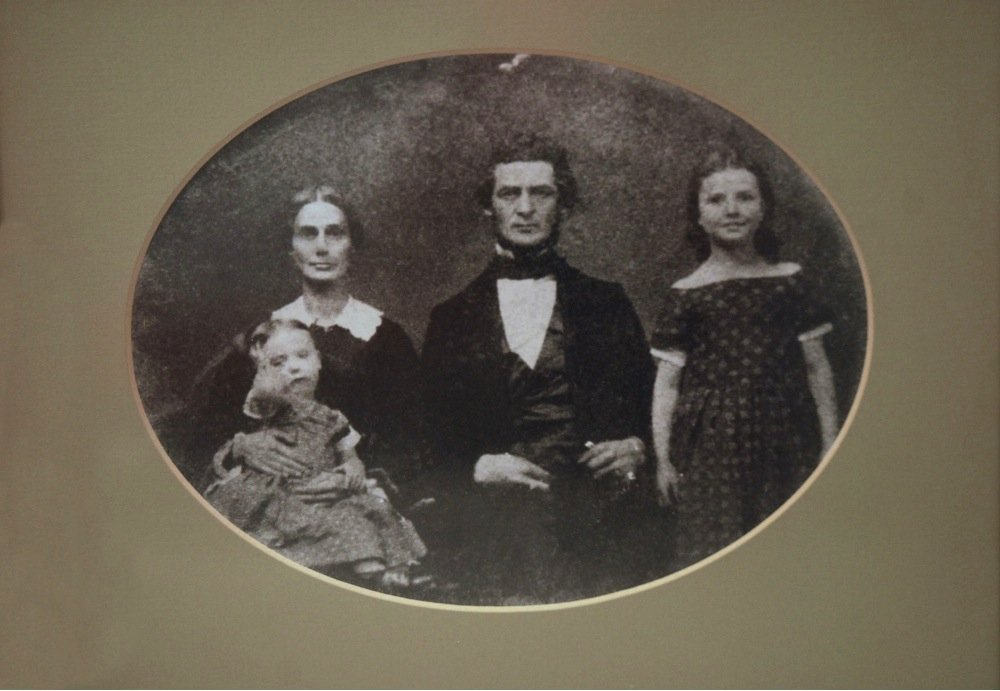
- Charlotte and Obed Dickinson with their two daughters in Salem, Oregon
- Born: June 15, 1818; Amherst, Massachusetts, US
- Died: November 27, 1892 (aged 74); Salem, Oregon, US
- Education: Marietta College; Andover Theological Seminary
- Occupations: Minister and business owner
- Spouse: Charlotte Dickinson
- Children: Cora Lamira; Edna
- Religion: Congregationalist; Seventh-day Adventist

Obed Dickinson (June 15, 1818 – November 27, 1892) was an American pioneer, abolitionist, minister, and business owner in Oregon. Born in Massachusetts, he eventually settled in Salem, Oregon, where he ministered and started a seed business.

== Early life ==
Obed Dickinson was born in Amherst, Massachusetts, on June 15, 1818, the oldest son of Obed Sr and Experience Smith. In 1836 Obed Sr, a universalist, moved to Michigan and purchased four 80-acre (32 ha) lots of land. Afterward, his wife and children joined him. Two years later Obed Sr died; subsequently, Obed Jr took over care of the family. Obed Jr worked on the family's farm until he was 25, and then he left to attend school at Marietta College in Ohio. After graduating from Marietta in 1849 he attended Andover Theological Seminary and was licensed to preach by the Andover Association. He was ordained as a Congregational home missionary in the West Parish Church of Andover in 1852.

== Settling in Salem ==
Obed Dickinson married Charlotte Dryer Humphrey on September 22, 1852; he was 34 and she was 35. In November of the same year they embarked from New York aboard the ship Trade Wind, headed for the Oregon Territory. Charlotte kept a detailed diary of the voyage, which took four months and sailed around the tip of Cape Horn with approximately 50 passengers including eight to ten children.

Obed and Charlotte arrived in Portland, Oregon in April 1853. After their arrival in Oregon it was determined that Dickinson would minister in Salem,

The farming region is important. These things being so, we are of opinion that it is better to occupy established points in the older counties first, especially as some on whom we relied have discontinued their labors in them. Brother Goodell, who was preaching in Salem, and who had organized a small church there, is about removing to another part of the Territory. The town is now the capital. It is in Marion County—one of the richest and most populous in the Territory. It is the place in which the University of the Methodist Episcopal Church is located. These facts, with others that I could name, lead to the stationing of Brother Dickinson in Salem.

It took eighteen days, traveling by boat and horse-drawn cart, for Obed and Charlotte to travel from Portland to Salem. They brought with them a table, chairs, stove, bedding, and other personal belongings. When they arrived in Salem the Congregational church's membership was four and Salem's population was approximately 500 people. In Salem they purchased half an acre (0.2 ha) and built a small 16-by-26-foot (4.9 by 7.9 m) home. They had little money and routinely wrote to the Missionary Society requesting help: "I am now so much in debt that I almost feel ashamed to meet a man in the street."

== Abolitionism ==
Obed Dickinson and his wife were abolitionists. Congregational ministers participated in the anti-slavery movement and had passed resolutions opposing slavery and denouncing slavery as morally wrong in their annual association meetings of 1854, 1855, 1856, and 1857. However, the majority were moderate and believed slavery could be gradually eliminated. Abolitionists believed slaveholding was a sin under all circumstances and that the sin must be condemned in unsparing and uncompromising terms. This meant excommunication of slaveholders and action to bring about the immediate and complete demise of slavery. Abolitionists also challenged the limits of racial prejudice in their times. As historian Manisha Sinha notes,"In American historiography, the standard definition of an abolitionist has always been someone who not only opposed the existence of slavery but also demanded African American citizenship.” Still white abolitionists' views and commitments to advancing racial equality varied in meaning and urgency and they were certainly not immune from the ubiquitous racial prejudice that they simultaneously labored against.

In both words and action, Obed Dickinson certainly demonstrated a commitment to racial equality that was at great variance with the overt, popular white supremacy of his time and place. In 1863 he stated, "It is true, we have no slavery now in Oregon, but we have that which is equally wrong: a prejudice and a hatred to the oppressed race." On Sunday, March 3, 1861, Dickinson welcomed nine new members into the Salem church. Three of the new members were African American, the first Black members of a Congregational church in Oregon, and possibly the first Black members of a "white" church in the state. The same year, Dickinson preached a sermon on Christian equality about the evils of caste and racial distinction. The mixed-race membership of the Salem Congregational church, along with Dickinson's abolitionist sermons, received negative attention from the local Statesman newspaper and resulted in some members becoming dissatisfied with Dickinson's stance. The leading donor of the church, Deacon Isaac Newton Gilbert, who usually contributed $100 annually to the church, withdrew his sponsorship. Dickinson wrote to the Missionary Society, "The deacon ... had neither paid up his own last year's subscription, nor had he made any effective effort to induce others to pay theirs. And the reason he said, that he would not pay it as long as I did and preached, in the way I did." In the same letter he went on to say, "In that sermon I said there is a wrong public opinion in this town. It has closed the doors of all our schools against the children of these black families dooming them to ignorance for life. I said it was wrong to take away the key of knowledge from any human." In December 1861, a secretary for the Mission Society, located on the east coast of the US, wrote Dickinson a threatening letter about the lack of financial support from Dickinson's congregation and the local community, "we should be forced to the conclusion that it was not the Lord's will that we should sustain you among them any longer ... Let us hope that they will do what they can."

In July 1862 Dickinson wrote to the Missionary Society with an update about his church, local Christian disapproval of his opinions, and his abolitionist activities. He noted that Black children were still not allowed in the public schools, but that his wife Charlotte, "has taken them under her own instruction, and now, daily, at evening, a company of four (with a fifth as often as her mistress will allow) may be seen for two hours, as attentive and earnest over their books as any white children whom you can find."

In early 1863 there were several meetings in the Salem Congregation church about Obed Dickinson's abolitionist stance and preaching about equality. Members of his church agreed with his anti-slavery stance, but questioned his methods. The local Statesman newspaper learned of disagreements within the church and published a column titled, "Religious Intelligence." In the column Dickinson was described as, "disseminating among his congregation negro-equality sentiment, with which he is wholly and conscientiously imbued." The column concludes, "The result is expected to be Mr. Dickinson's resignation of or removal from the pastorate of the church." The Portland Commercial Reporter newspaper also wrote about Dickinson's church, suggesting that he should, "go to Africa to preach."

In March 1863 Dickinson was not reappointed at the church. Because of his removal, the church community in Salem was able to raise the funds they needed to complete a new church building. After raising the funds, the church recalled Dickinson to the pulpit in June of the same year, but he did not return until September.

=== Marriage of America Waldo and Richard Arthur Bogle ===
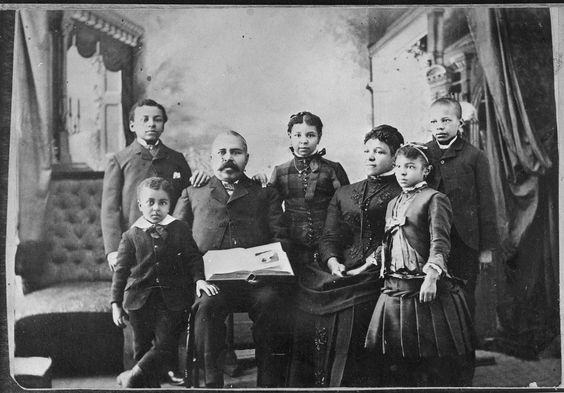
Richard Bogle and America Waldo Bogle with their children.

In Salem, on January 1, 1863, Dickinson presided over the marriage of America Waldo and Richard Arthur Bogle, and hosted their reception—both America and Richard were Black residents of Salem. The wedding was on the same day that President Lincoln's Emancipation Proclamation went into effect. The wedding and reception were controversial because both white and Black guests attended, going against racial segregation practices of the time. Newspaper editor of the Oregon Statesman, Asahel Bush, called the wedding "shameful" in his newspaper and in a letter to Matthew Deady he wrote, "It was a negro equality sentiment mixed up with a little snob-aristocracy." His newspaper also reported, "The continuation of Mr. Dickinson's anti-slavery and negro sympathy preachings was calculated only to prevent the growth of the church, and retard the spread of religion." The Oregonian retorted to Bush's negative press coverage by saying, "the heart of a man who could be guilty of making light even of a poor mulatto girl's feelings is blacker than the skin of any African." News of the wedding traveled all the way to the San Francisco Bulletin, where it was written that the wedding included, "distinguished white ladies and gentlemen, who saw proper to witness the ceremony and participate in the festive proceedings."

=== Resignation from the Congregational Church ===
Despite the pressure from his congregation, local community, and the Statesman, Dickinson never wavered in his convictions against slavery and for racial equality. When Dickinson resigned from the Congregational church in 1867, the church numbered 96 members, up substantially from the four members when he began his ministry in 1853. Dickinson left the Congregational church because of the pressure to curtail his outspoken views against slavery and for equality.

== Seed business and later life ==
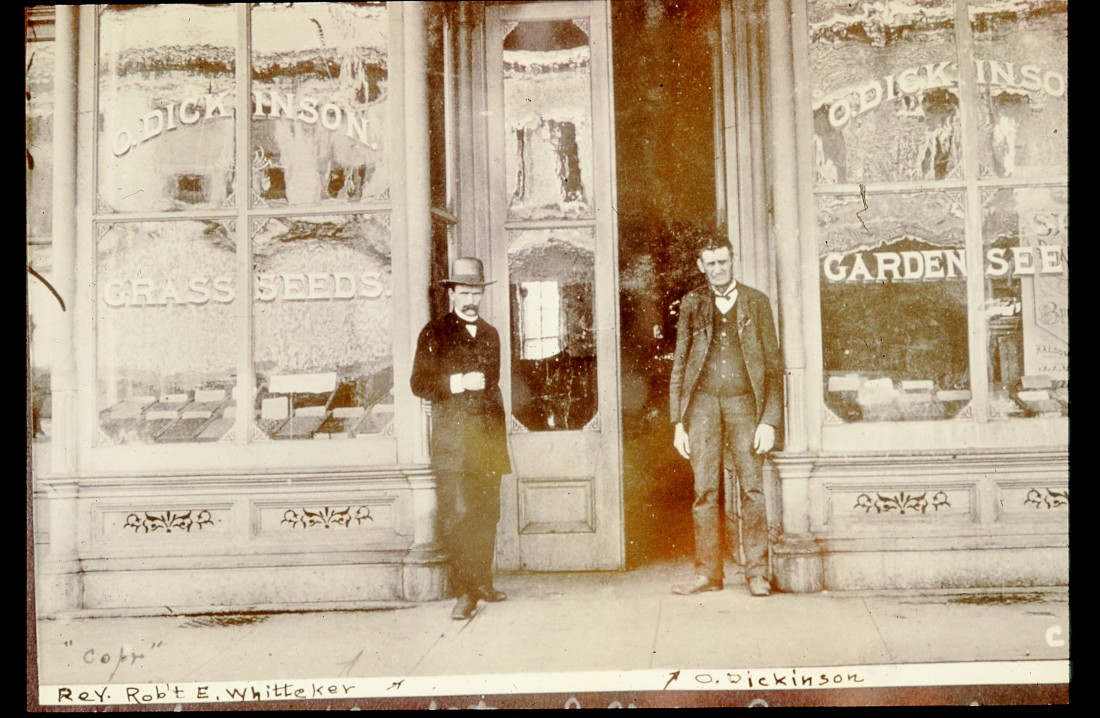
Robert E Whitteker (left) and Obed Dickinson (right) in front of O. Dickinson seed store in Salem, Oregon, approximately 1867

The church did not pay enough to sustain Dickinson's family, and he wrote in his letters to the Home Missionary that he had to do the job of two men, that of a pastor and laborer. Dickinson launched his seed business in 1865 while still serving as minister for the Congregational church. That year he hired the Oregon Statesman to print 1,000 labels for seeds and 800 leaflets listing his goods for sale. After he resigned from the church in 1867 he focused on his seed business and nursery.

He spent time as a public school director and as a trustee for Willamette and Pacific universities.

In 1876 he became a Seventh-day Adventist and eventually became a pastor with that church.

His seed business thrived and continued after his death in 1892.

== Family ==
Dickinson and his wife Charlotte had four children, but only one survived beyond infancy, Cora Lamira. They adopted a second daughter, Edna.
