= Andrew Bogle =

Andrew Bogle may refer to:

- Andrew Bogle, a figure in the Tichborne case
- Andrew Cathcart Bogle (1829–1890), recipient of the Victoria Cross
- Andrew Nisbet Bogle (1868–1957), Scottish minister of the Free Church of Scotland

== See also ==
- Bogle (surname)
