= Bogle (disambiguation) =

A bogle is a ghost in Northumbrian and Scottish folklore. Bogle may also refer to:

- Bogle (surname), list of people named Bogle
- Bogle (dancer) (1964–2005), Jamaican dancer and choreographer
- Bogle (manga), a manga series written by Yuko Ichiju and illustrated by Shino Taira
- Bogle dance, a dance move originating in Jamaica
- Bogle Park, a softball stadium in Fayetteville, Arkansas
- Bogle Stroll, an annual sponsored walk in Manchester, England
- Bogle Vineyards, a California winery
- Bogle (crater), a crater on the Uranian moon Puck.
- Bogle, a primordial monster from My Singing Monsters

== See also ==
- Bogel, a municipality in Rhineland-Palatinate, Germany
- Bogles, a town in Carriacou, Grenada
- Boggle, a word game
