= Sally Bush =

American photographer (1860–1946)

- Photo credit: Bush House Museum, Salem Art Association Photo ID number bh1317.
- Born: October 29, 1860; Salem, Oregon, US
- Died: November 3, 1946 (aged 86); Salem, Oregon, US
- Resting place: Salem Pioneer Cemetery
- Education: Smith College
- Known for: Philanthropy, photography
- Board member of: Ladd and Bush bank, Vice President
- Parents: Asahel Bush (father); Eugenia (Zieber) Bush (mother)

Sally Bush (October 29, 1860 – November 3, 1946) was an American photographer also known for her quiet philanthropy, especially her generosity toward hungry people during the Great Depression of the 1930s. She also served as her father's hostess at their home, Bush House in Salem, Oregon, in the United States.

== Early life and education ==
Sally Bush, daughter of Asahel Bush and Eugenia (Zieber)Born in Salem, Bush was the third of their four children. When she was almost three years old, her mother died of tuberculosis in 1863. She attended Sacred Heart Academy in Salem, and graduated from high school from Moravian Seminary in Bethlehem, Pennsylvania. After attending Martha Burnham school in Northampton, Massachusetts, she graduated from Smith College in 1883.

While she was still at Smith, she assisted her father in choosing wallpaper and other furnishings and budgeted their money for the new Bush residence in Salem, Oregon. It was eventually completed in 1887.

== "Lady of the House" ==
For the next thirty years, Bush hosted guests from the town, as well as her father's business and political acquaintances. She was also

...the loving caretaker of the home; the hostess at her father's dinner parties; the avid gardener, cultivating the flowers of the newly constructed Conservatory near the house, managing the vegetable beds and fruit trees on the property; the animal lover, tending to the cows and other farmyard creatures, caring for the dogs and cats — particularly the cats — which people left at her doorstep, knowing that each would be given a home.

She "carried on her many charities without ostentation", encouraging and sometimes financing the early careers of young writers and artists. Although she was a "complete vegetarian", she offered guests main courses of fish, fowl or meat, as well as many vegetable choices. She was a member of the Salem Garden Club and the Unitarian Church.

Bush purchased a 1909 Baker electric car, but stopped driving it after her first outing, when she drove it through the front window of a local pharmacy. Subsequently, chauffeurs drove the car.

By 1912, she had become the vice president of the Ladd and Bush bank established by her father.

Bush House from Mission Street, with oak trees, wildflowers, and cat. By Sally Bush, using glass plate negative process. Photo credit: Bush House Museum, Salem Art Association Photo ID number bh0005

== Photography ==
Along with her brother A. N. Bush, Sally Bush became a proficient photographer. The Salem Public Library archives include over 2200 of their photographs, more than half taken by her, some using glass plate negatives. She created both portraits and candid photos of her friends and family, Bush House, the grounds, and conservatory.

== Legacy ==
Bush is remembered as "a kind, generous, and compassionate woman, always prepared to assist families in need of food or clothing", focusing much of their legacy in "quiet philanthropy". In her honor, the Bush House Museum has established an annual Sally Bush Memorial Food Drive, in conjunction with the "Women Ending Hunger" campaign of the Marion-Polk Food Share.

She has also been honored for her stewardship of Bush's Pasture Park and Historic Deepwood Estate, in an exhibition at the Bush Barn Art Center, Parks for People: Lord and Schryver's Legacy.

== See also ==
- Elizabeth Blodget Lord
- Edith Schryver
