= America Waldo Bogle =

African-American settler in Oregon (1844–1903)

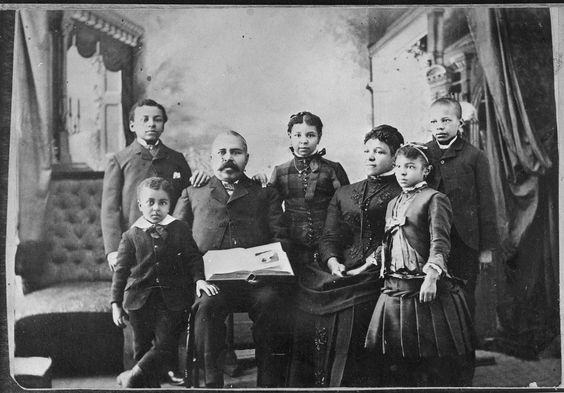
- Born: June 2, 1844; Missouri, US
- Died: December 28, 1903 (aged 59); Walla Walla, Washington, US
- Known for: Early pioneer of the Oregon Territory

America Waldo Bogle (June 2, 1844 – December 28, 1903) was a pioneer in the Oregon Territory. She and her husband, Richard Arthur Bogle, were among the first Black settlers in Walla Walla, Washington.

== Early life ==
America Waldo was born in Missouri on June 2, 1844. Her mother is believed to have been a slave of Missouri farmer John Waldo (1796–1849), and her father was a white man, probably either John Waldo or his brother Joseph (1805–1871). In 1854 America traveled by wagon train to Oregon with John Waldo's widow, Avarilla, and several other African Americans. They spent the winter with Avarilla's brother-in-law, Daniel Waldo, at his farm east of Salem. In the spring of 1855 they moved south to Douglas County where Avarilla established a Donation Land claim near Roseburg, Oregon. America remained in the Roseburg area for the next five years, during which time she met her future husband, Richard Arthur Bogle, a barber in Roseburg. In 1861 she returned with Avarilla to Salem where she lived with the Daniel Waldo family until her marriage. Daniel Waldo, a former legislator in the Provisional Government of Oregon, who had arrived in Oregon with the Great Migration of 1843, "may have taken responsibility for raising her and thus acted as a father figure." In 1862 Richard Bogle left Roseburg and settled in Walla Walla, Washington, but returned to Oregon briefly at the end of that year to prepare for his marriage to America.

== Marriage in Oregon ==
In Salem, Oregon, on January 1, 1863, at the age of 18, America Waldo married Richard Arthur Bogle, a free Black man born in Jamaica. Their wedding was on the same day that President Lincoln's Emancipation Proclamation went into effect. The wedding was controversial because there were both white and black guests at the ceremony, going against racial segregation practices. Daniel Waldo, although he didn't attend the wedding, publicly supported the couple and gave them "several gifts of great value with which to start their home." Newspaper editor Asahel Bush called the wedding "shameful" in the local newspaper and in a letter to Matthew Deady he wrote, "It was a negro equality sentiment mixed up with a little snob-aristocracy." The Oregonian retorted to Bush's negative press coverage by saying, "the heart of a man who could be guilty of making light even of a poor mulatto girl's feelings is blacker than the skin of any African." News of the wedding traveled all the way to the San Francisco Bulletin, where it was written that the wedding included, "distinguished white ladies and gentlemen, who saw proper to witness the ceremony and participate in the festive proceedings."

== Walla Walla, Washington ==
The Bogles settled in Walla Walla, Washington, where, in addition to Richard's job as a barber, they started a 200-acre ranch. America Waldo Bogle was known as "a lady of estimable character, noted for her deeds of charity to the poor and suffering." She died in Walla Walla on December 28, 1903, and her husband died a year later on November 22, 1904. On the day of her funeral all the barbershops in Walla Walla closed early out of a "profound respect the employing barbers entertain for the late Mrs. Richard A. Bogle." America and Richard had eight children together. Her three older children died between 1876 and 1878. Her five surviving children were Arthur, Warren, Belle, Katherine and Waldo, and the sons followed in their father's footsteps and became barbers.

== Legacy ==
America and Richard's commitment to hard work and community involvement was continued in subsequent generations of the Bogle family. Examples include: her daughter-in-law Bonnie Bogle (1885–1953) who wrote a regular column in the Seattle Enterprise newspaper and was very active in Portland's civil rights and women's suffrage movements; her granddaughter-in-law Kathryn Bogle (1906–2003), a social worker, activist and freelance journalist in Portland; and her great-grandson, Richard "Dick" Bogle, who became a television newsman and the second African-American city commissioner in Portland, Oregon.

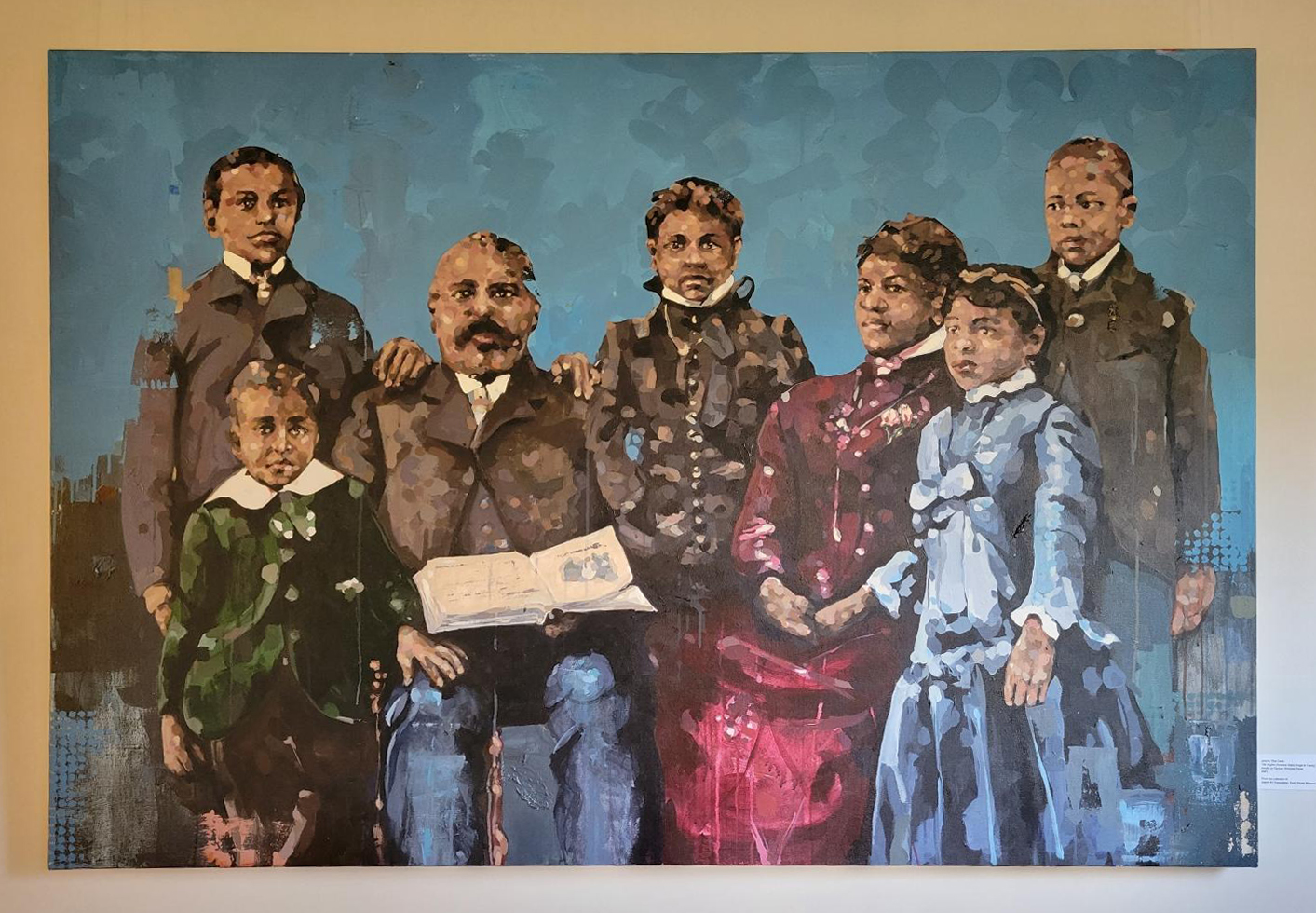
America (third from right) and her family by Jeremy Oaki Davis, hangs in the newly dedicated America Waldo Bogle Gallery at the Bush House Museum, Salem Oregon.

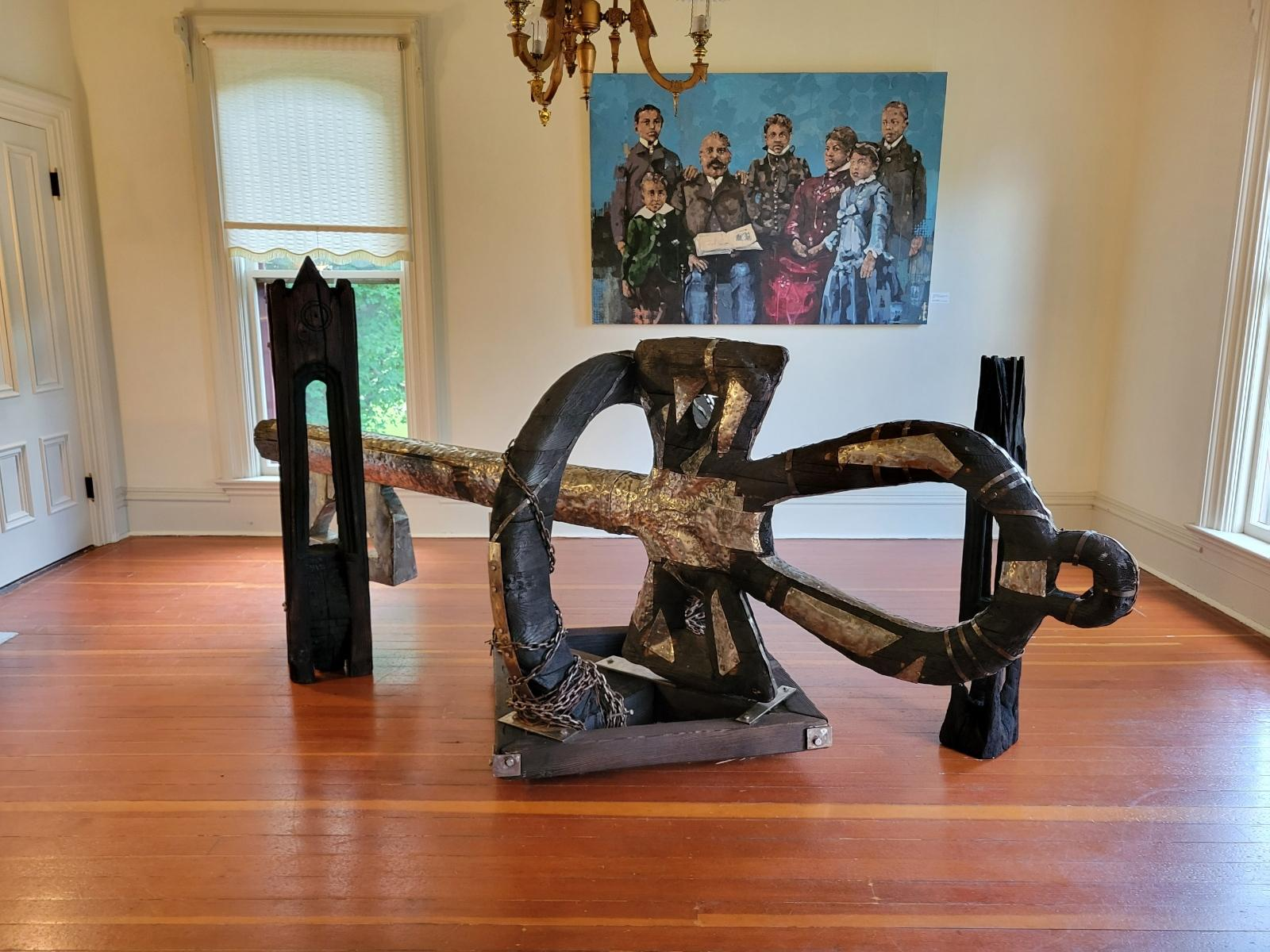
The America Waldo Bogle Gallery at the Bush House Museum, Salem Oregon.

In 2023 Salem Oregon's Bush House Museum (named for its original owner, newspaperman Asahel Bush, and part of Bush's Pasture Park) dedicated one room of the museum as the America Waldo Bogle Gallery. The gallery includes a permanent collection of commissioned paintings by Portland artist Jeremy Okai Davis representing portraits of early Oregon Black pioneers, including one of America and her family. The gallery was named in America's honor "because the stories of nineteenth-century Black women are rarely told, particularly against the legacies of powerful men like Asahel Bush." "Asahel Bush wouldn't have invited America Waldo Bogle… or presumably any future portrait subjects into his home. He didn't regard their lives as worthy of consideration… Thankfully, this is no longer Bush's choice to make."
