= Christopher J. Perry =

American businessman, newspaper founder, and editor (1854–1921)

Christopher James Perry
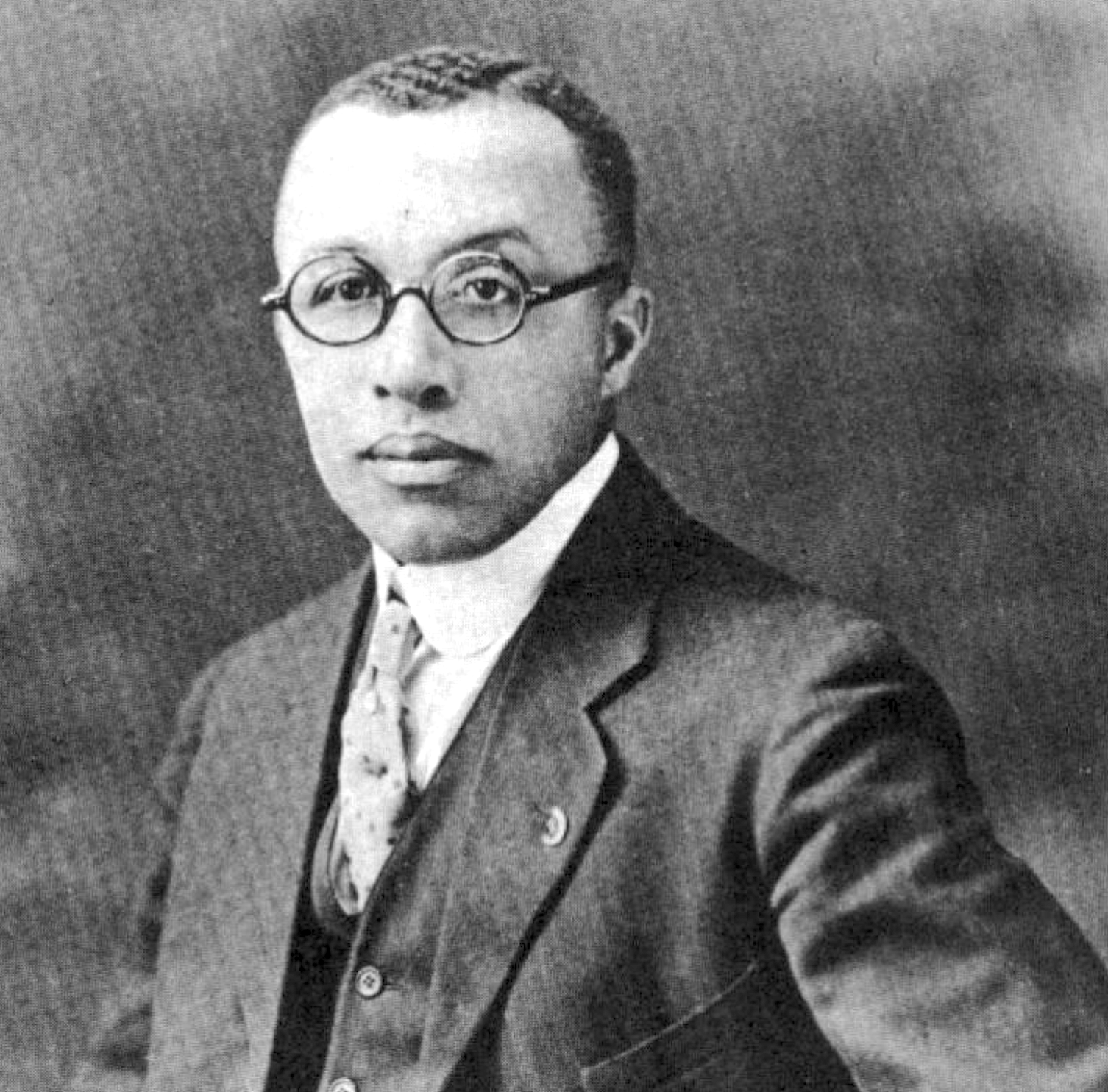
- Born: Christopher James Perry; September 11, 1854; Baltimore, Maryland, U.S.
- Died: May 15, 1921; Philadelphia, Pennsylvania, U.S.
- Burial place: Eden Cemetery, Collingdale, Pennsylvania, U.S.
- Other names: Christopher J. Perry, Sr., Chris J. Perry
- Occupations: Businessman, politician, civil rights activist, newspaper founder, newspaper editor, journalist

Christopher James Perry, Sr. (1854–1921) was an American businessman, politician, civil rights activist, newspaper founder, newspaper editor, and journalist. He was the founder of The Tribune (later known as The Philadelphia Tribune), the longest running African-American newspaper.

== Early life ==
Christopher James Perry was born on September 11, 1854, in Baltimore, Maryland, to parents that were free people of color. When he was young, he moved to Philadelphia, in order to continue his education. In 1867 at the age of 14, Perry started writing for local newspapers.

== Career ==
By November 1881, Perry was writing for the Sunday Mercury in New York City; and he later became the editor of the "colored department". In 1884, he lost his job due to the newspaper's bankruptcy; so Perry established his own newspaper on November 27, 1884, The Tribune (later known as The Philadelphia Tribune). The first issue of the newspaper was written by hand, in an office located at 725 Sansom Street in Philadelphia.

According to a United States census report, in 1880 the Black population in Philadelphia was 847,170 and by 1920 the Black population in Philadelphia rose to 1,823,779. Within the Black community the city became overcrowded and the job market became highly competitive. Perry used his newspaper to uplift and educate Black Philadelphians about social and political issues at both the local and national level; with a goal of supporting the middle class Black community's ability to gain higher education and local, decent paying jobs. Throughout his career with The Tribune, Perry promoted the advancement of African Americans in society, and covered issues affecting their daily lives.

For 10 years, he was a member of the Philadelphia City Council from the seventh ward. He was a member of the Lombard Street Central Presbyterian.

== Death and legacy ==
Perry worked on the Tribune until his death. Perry died of cancer on May 15, 1921, at his home in Philadelphia. He was interred at Eden Cemetery (sometimes known as Marion Cemetery).

Ten years after his death by 1930, The Tribune had a circulation of over 20,000, and became a vehicle of community change.
