= Al Moore (American football) =

American football player (1908–1991)

No. 8
- Position: Halfback

Personal information
- Born: April 17, 1908; Portland, Oregon, U.S.
- Died: March 23, 1991 (aged 82); Crawford, Colorado, U.S.
- Listed height: 5 ft 9 in (1.75 m)
- Listed weight: 185 lb (84 kg)

Career information
- High school: Washington (Portland)
- College: Northwestern (1928–1931)

Career history
- Chicago Bears (1932)
- Stats at Pro Football Reference

Albert Bennett Moore (April 17, 1908 – March 23, 1991) was an American professional football halfback who played one season with the Chicago Bears of the National Football League (NFL). He played college football at Northwestern University.

== Early life and college ==
Albert Bennett Moore was born on April 17, 1908, in Portland, Oregon. He attended Washington High School in Portland.

He was a member of the Northwestern Wildcats of Northwestern University from 1928 to 1931 and a three-year letterman from 1929 to 1931.

== Professional career ==
Moore signed with the Chicago Bears of the National Football League (NFL) in 1932. He played in two games for the Bears during the 1932 season, rushing six times for 17 yards. He was released in 1932. Moore was listed as a halfback while with the Bears and wore jersey number 8. He stood 5'9" and weighed 185 pounds.

== Personal life ==
Moore died on March 23, 1991, in Crawford, Colorado at the age of 82.
