= Mississippi Studios =

Music venue and recording studio in Portland, Oregon

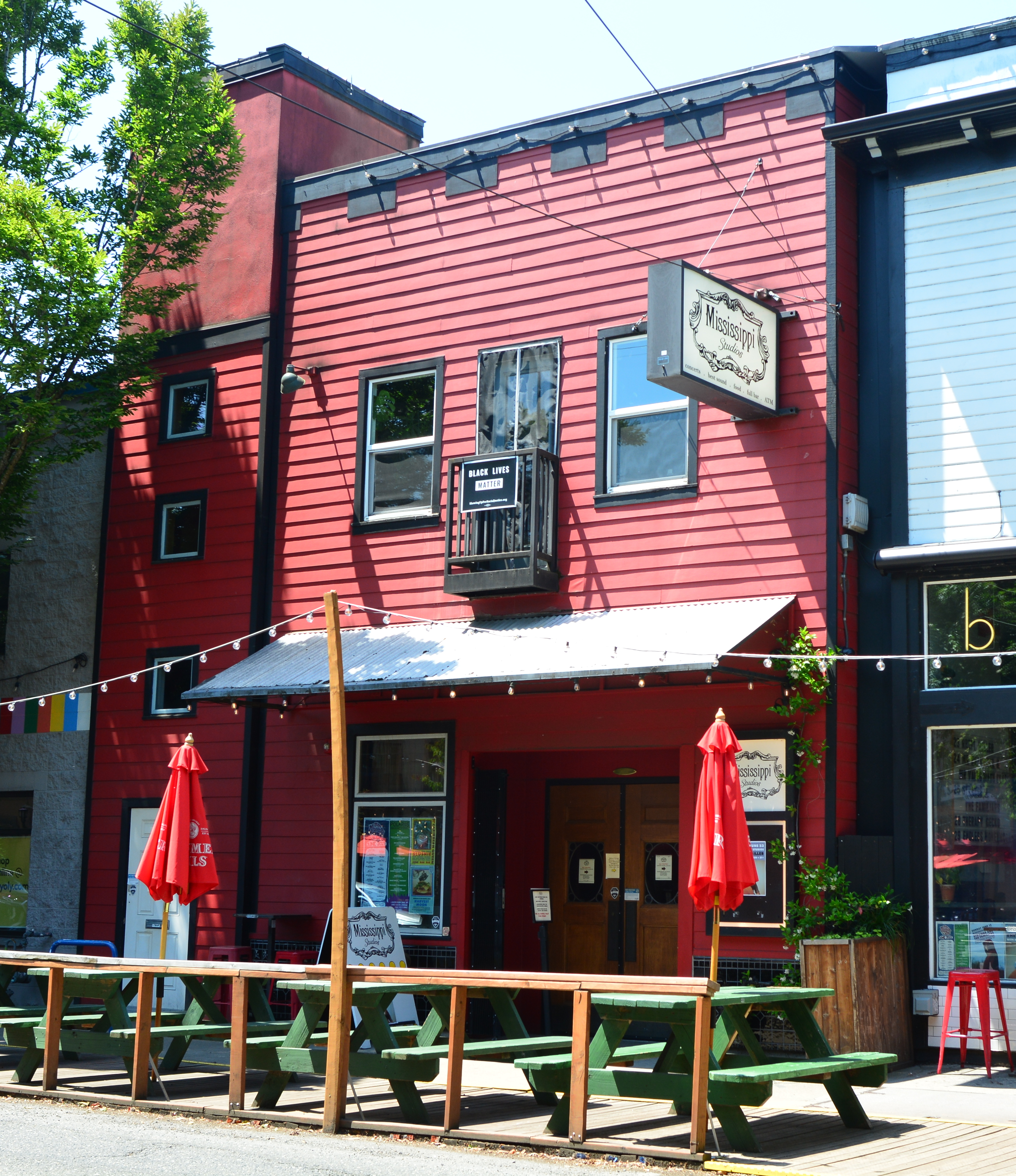
- Street view, 2023
- Interactive map of Mississippi Studios
- Address: 3939 North Mississippi Avenue
- Location: Portland, Oregon, United States
- Coordinates: 45.55145°N 122.67585°W

Website
- mississippistudios.com

Mississippi Studios is a music venue and recording studio in Portland, Oregon's Boise neighborhood, United States.

== History ==
The studio opened in 2003. Jim Brunberg and Kevin Cradock are owners. The venue was formerly a Baptist church, but has since been completely rebuilt and enlarged, partially using materials from the church.

== See also ==
- Culture of Portland, Oregon
- Revolution Hall
