= Washington High School (Oregon) =

Historic building and former school in Portland, Oregon, U.S.

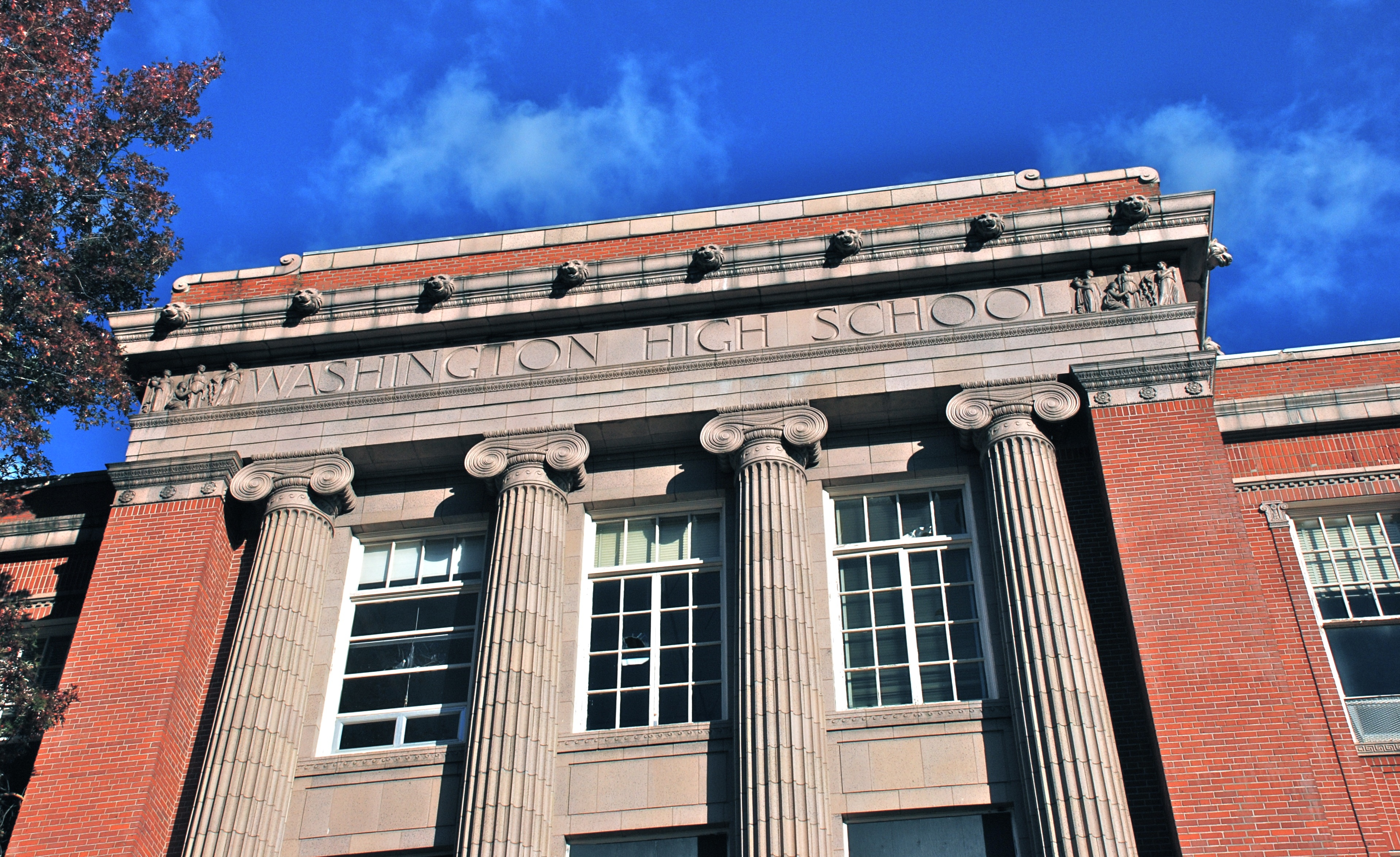
- Front of the former school building in 2013
- 1300 SE Stark Street, Portland, Oregon 97214; United States

Information
- Type: Public
- Opened: 1906
- Status: School closed; 1924 building still standing
- Closed: 1981
- School district: Portland Public Schools
- Grades: 9–12
- Enrollment: 1,557 (1922); 1,826 (1924); 1,500 (1969); 883 (1981)
- Colors: maroon and gold
- Mascot: George Washington
- Nickname: Colonials
- Washington High School
- U.S. National Register of Historic Places
- Location: Portland, Oregon
- Coordinates: 45°31′8.3″N 122°39′7.2″W
- Built: 1924
- Architect: Houghtaling & Dougan
- Architectural style: Classical Revival
- NRHP reference No.: 15000779
- Added to NRHP: November 9, 2015

Washington High School was a high school in Portland, Oregon, United States, from 1906 to 1981. After fire destroyed the original building, a new building was completed in 1924. The school merged with Monroe High School in 1978 to become Washington-Monroe High School. The school closed shortly after in 1981. A few years later it was used as the Children's Services Center, a multipurpose social service facility that also provided day care and other programs for at risk youth. After that the building was vacant for many years. It was also used for a time as a location for administrative offices for the Portland Public Schools.

During a brief time around 2005, Washington High School was used as a temporary site for the relocation of some of the newly arrived survivors from Hurricane Katrina. In 2009, it was used as the site for the Portland Institute for Contemporary Art's Time-Based Arts Festival or TBA. In October 2013, plans to renovate the building for commercial use were advancing, with a mix of retail and office use planned. New Seasons Market relocated its offices to the building in 2015 and is the largest tenant. The former auditorium was repurposed as a music venue called Revolution Hall, which opened in February 2015. The building was listed on the National Register of Historic Places in November 2015.

== School history ==
The first Washington High School was originally named East Side High School. It opened in September 1906, with classes temporarily held in an elementary school while its permanent building was being constructed and moved into its permanent building in February 1907, located at SE 14th and Stark. The East Side High School was renamed Washington in 1909. The original building was destroyed by fire on October 25, 1922. A replacement was constructed on the same site, made of reinforced concrete with a brick surface. Designed by the Portland architectural firm of Houghtaling & Dougan, the new building also featured terra cotta trim. It opened for students on September 2, 1924.

Due to the baby boom and passing of a $25 million building levy by the school district in 1947, a new gymnasium was slated to be built.

In fall 1978, Washington High School merged with Monroe High School and became Washington-Monroe High School. Monroe H.S. was an all-girls vocational sister school to Benson Polytechnic High School. After the merge, the old Monroe High School building housed a number of programs until 1994, when it became da Vinci Arts Middle School. It was established in 1917 at Southwest 14th and Morrison and was named Girls Polytechnic High School until fall 1967, when it was renamed James Monroe High School. Monroe High School had only 470 students in fall 1977, the smallest enrollment of any public high school in Portland. Washington's enrollment had declined sharply in the 1970s, from 1,504 in the 1968–69 school year to 773 in the 1977–78 school year, leading to the decision to merge the two schools, on the Washington H.S. campus.

In the late 1970s and early 1980s, Portland Public Schools (PPS) was faced with declining enrollment overall, as well, and targeted Cleveland High School (originally Clinton Kelly High School of Commerce) for closure. The Cleveland High School property was divided into two parcels: The site of the school building and the site of the athletic field, originally the site of the Clinton Kelly mansion. Clinton Kelly, an early Portland settler and minister, specified that the property was to be used solely for a public school. If the property was used for any other purpose, or put up for sale, the property would revert to the Kelly estate, and to the living heirs of Clinton Kelly. PPS ultimately decided to close Washington H.S. ("Washington-Monroe" by then), and keep Cleveland H.S. open.

Washington-Monroe High School closed in May 1981. Enrollment at the end was 883 students.

== Post-school use ==
After its 1981 closure as a school, the building was used for school district administrative purposes until around 2003. During that time a portion of it was also used for a public performance space. Subsequently, the building was vacant, although it was prepared to house Hurricane Katrina evacuees in fall 2005.

In the 2002–2003 school year, Portland Public Schools identified a number of properties that it considered "surplus" based on the recommendation of Innovation Partnerships and the Real Estate Investment Trust.

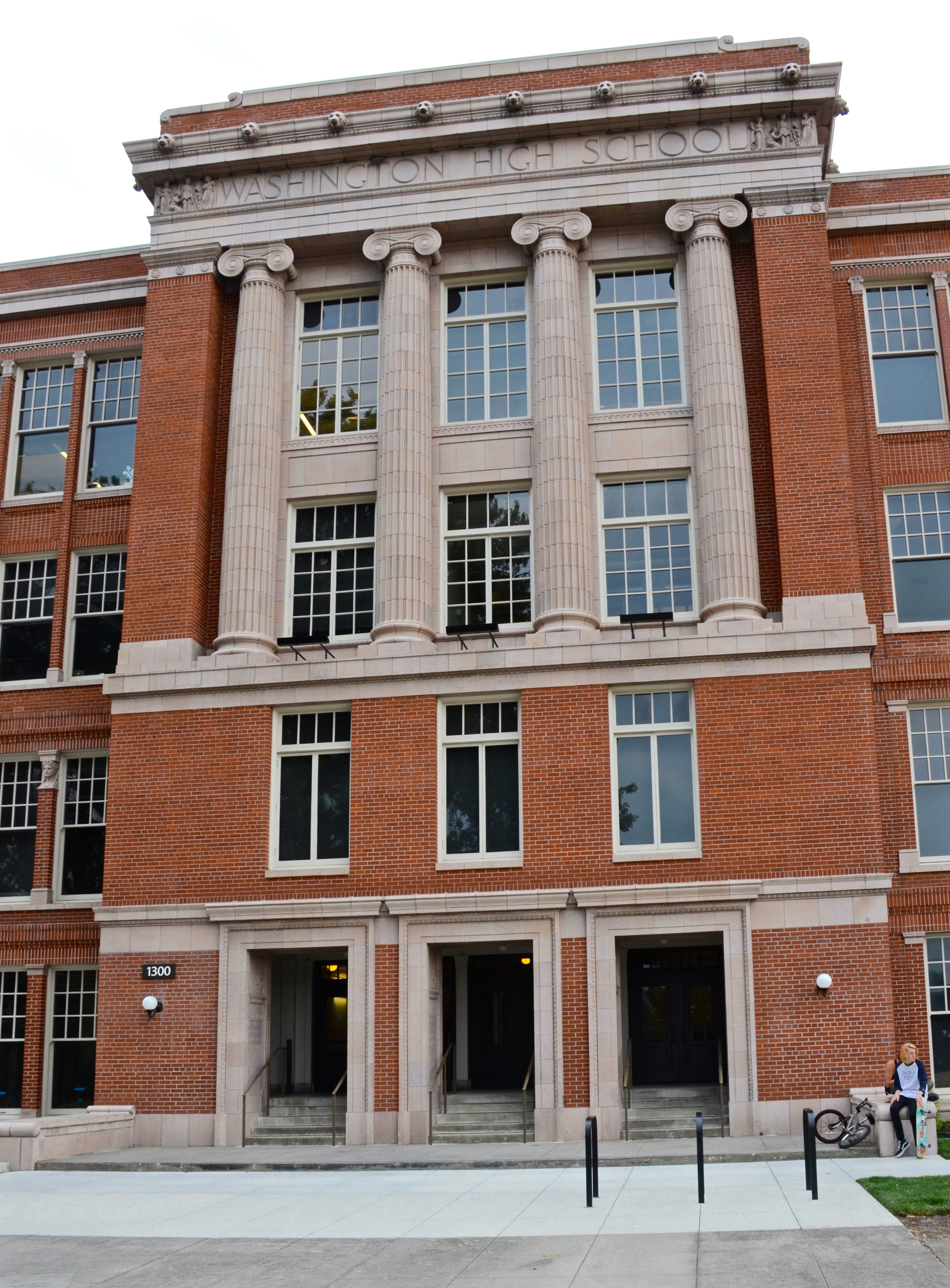
Central portion of building's front (west side) in 2015, after renovation

In 2005, the City of Portland purchased 5.4 acres (22,000 m^{2}) of the school property for $4.5 million. That parcel included the gym, a three-story addition, a one-story outbuilding and the track and field. At that time, the city was intending to use the land for a community center and athletic fields when funding became available. The remaining 2.6 acres (11,000 m^{2}) comprises two parcels in the northeast and southeast corners of the site, one largely vacant, and the other housing the multi-story brick high school building. Beam Development was planning on developing the space into condos and commercial buildings.

In 2009, Portland Parks & Recreation received funds as a result of the support of Senators Ron Wyden and Gordon H. Smith. This money was received as a United States Department of Housing and Urban Development grant for $665,000. In April 2009, an advisory committee was appointed by Portland Commissioner Nick Fish to develop the scope and program for the facility.

Though it was opened and cleaned out, in part, due to the TBA Festival, in 2009 the site was still slated to be turned into a community center. Preservation talks about the planned center were still under way.

Concurrently, PPS commissioned an update of an appraisal on the building, which was due to be finished in January 2010. The district also plans to issue a "request for information" to see if any other developers are interested in buying the long-vacant high school. Doug Capps, a PPS facilities manager, told an advisory committee on December 1, 2009, that an offer on the building could be submitted to the school board as soon as March or April 2010.

In April 2011, local volunteers began the process of creating the Buckman Historic District which, if approved, would have included Washington High School. However, the proposal to create such a district was dropped in 2013 after failing to attract sufficient support from property owners in the affected area.

== Renovation and repurposing ==
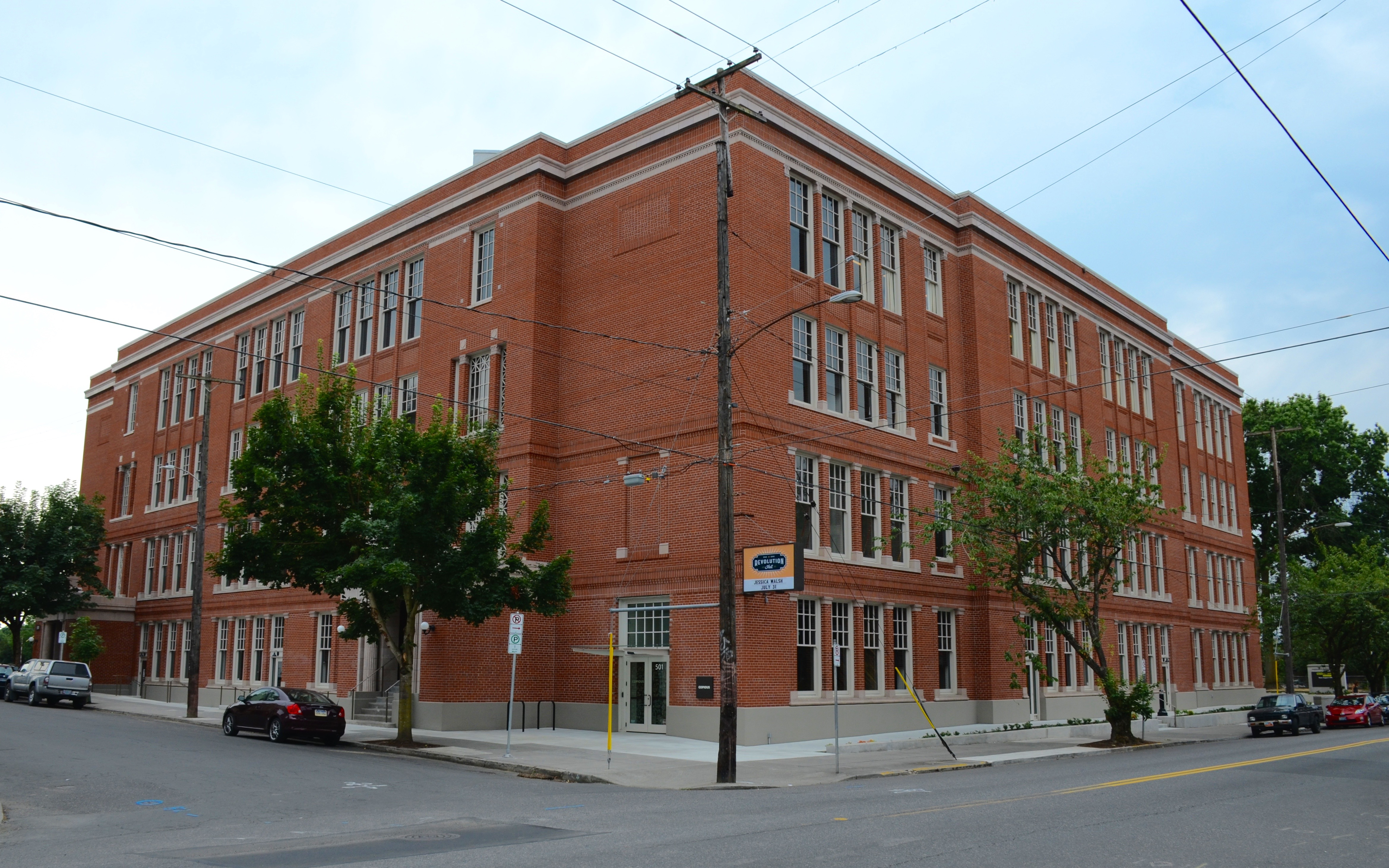
Seen from the northeast, at 14th & Stark, with small corner marquee for Revolution Hall, the new music venue

In October 2013, plans for a private firm to acquire the building and begin renovation were advancing. The developer planned to use the ground floor for retail use and the upper floors as office space. In September 2014, New Seasons Market signed a lease to move its headquarters to the building, occupying over a third of the office space; as of January 2015, the move was scheduled for March 2015. A decade later, in August 2025, the company announced that it planned to move out of the building and to another building in Portland's Central Eastside area.

The Washington High School building was reopened in early 2015. Classrooms had been converted into office space (with 55,000 ft^{2} (5,100 m^{2})), and the auditorium was converted into a music venue called Revolution Hall.

== Athletics ==
Washington High School athletic teams competed in the Portland Interscholastic League of the Oregon School Activities Association.

=== State championships ===
- Baseball: 1948
- Basketball: 1928, 1945
- Boys' golf: 1948
- Boys' Track and Field: 1932, 1933, 1934
- Football: 1910, 1912
- Girls tennis: 1958

== Notable alumni ==
- Pauline Alderman, musicologist and composer
- Victor Atiyeh, former Governor of Oregon
- James Beard, chef, author
- Dick Bogle, journalist and politician
- Kathryn Hall Bogle, social worker and journalist
- Steven G. Bradbury, 1976, 14th United States deputy secretary of transportation
- Mel Brown, Motown and jazz drummer
- Brian Cole (bass guitarist), member of The Association
- Jack Ely
- Leah Hing, aviator
- Byron Houck, baseball player and cinematographer
- Eldon Jenne
- Ed Lewis, star collegiate basketball player of the 1930s
- Al Moore, American football player
- Bill Naito, longtime Portland businessman and civic leader
- Jack Patera, 1951, head coach of the Seattle Seahawks (1976–1982)
- Paul L. Patterson
- Linus Pauling, two-time Nobel Prize winner; awarded an honorary diploma in 1962, 45 years after leaving Washington, because he was not allowed to take a required course a year early in order to attend Oregon State University.
- Fred L. Peterson
- Howard Ramsey, World War I veteran
- Richard Sundeleaf
- John Yezerski

== See also ==
- National Register of Historic Places listings in Southeast Portland, Oregon
