= Revolution Hall =

American music venue in Oregon, opened 2015

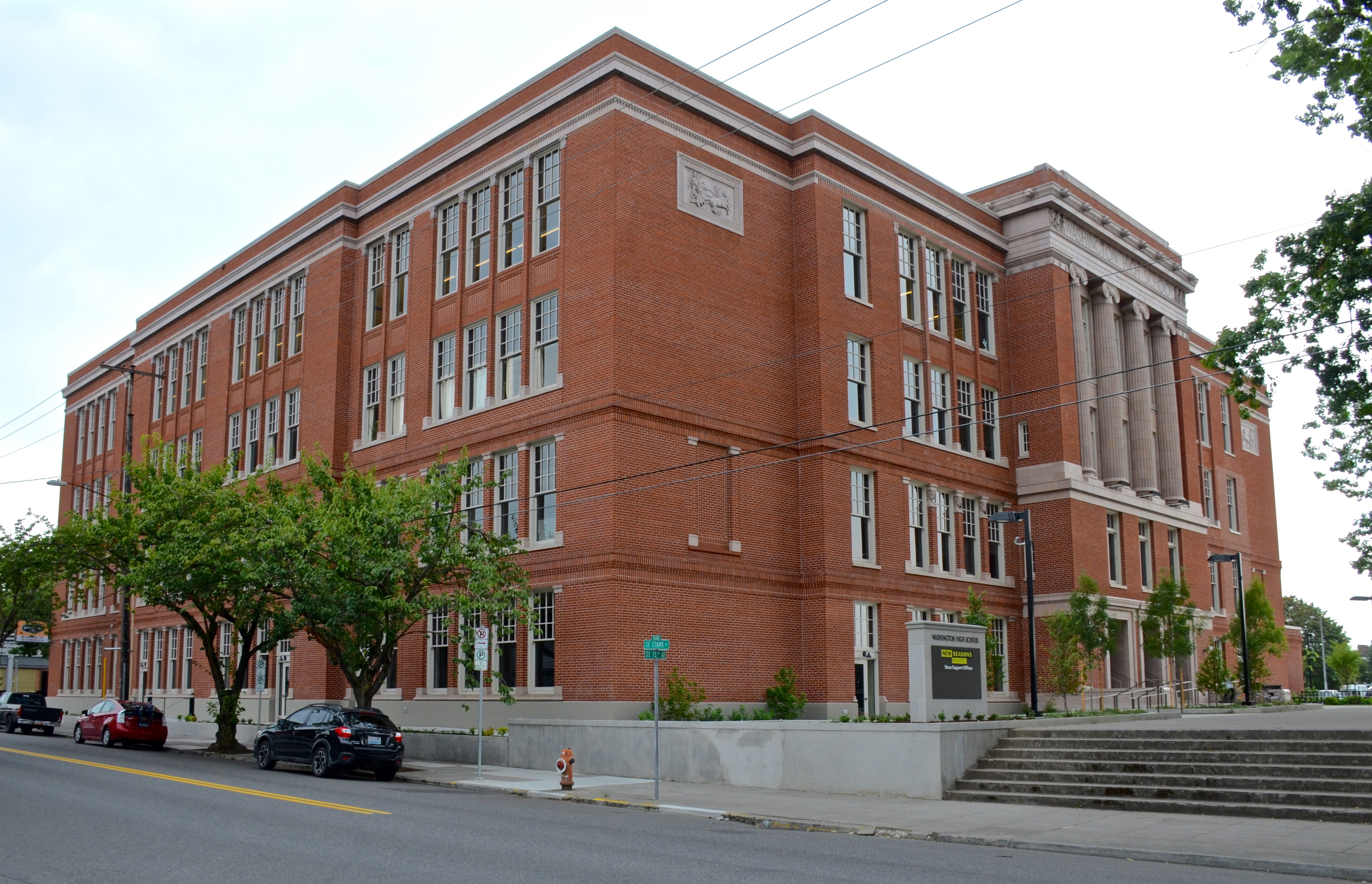
- The former high school building viewed from the northwest
- Interactive map of Revolution Hall
- Former names: Washington High School Auditorium (1922–1981)
- Address: 1300 Southeast Stark Street; Portland, Oregon; United States
- Coordinates: 45.518988°N 122.654246°W
- Owner: Good George LLC (owned by Mississippi Productions Inc.)
- Operator: Mississippi Studios & True West Concerts
- Capacity: 850 seats
- Type: Music venue

Construction
- Opened: September 2, 1924
- Reopened: February 12, 2015

Website
- www.revolutionhall.com

Revolution Hall is a music venue in the Buckman neighborhood of Portland, Oregon. It is located within the former Washington High School, and was originally constructed as the school's auditorium. The auditorium was in use from the school's opening in 1924 to its closure in 1981, and was unused until February 2015. As part of a larger redevelopment that saw the school converted into office and retail space, the auditorium was renovated into a music venue. During construction, two bars and a roof deck were added, but the original wooden seats were preserved.

The venue officially opened on April 17, 2015, with a concert by Neko Case.

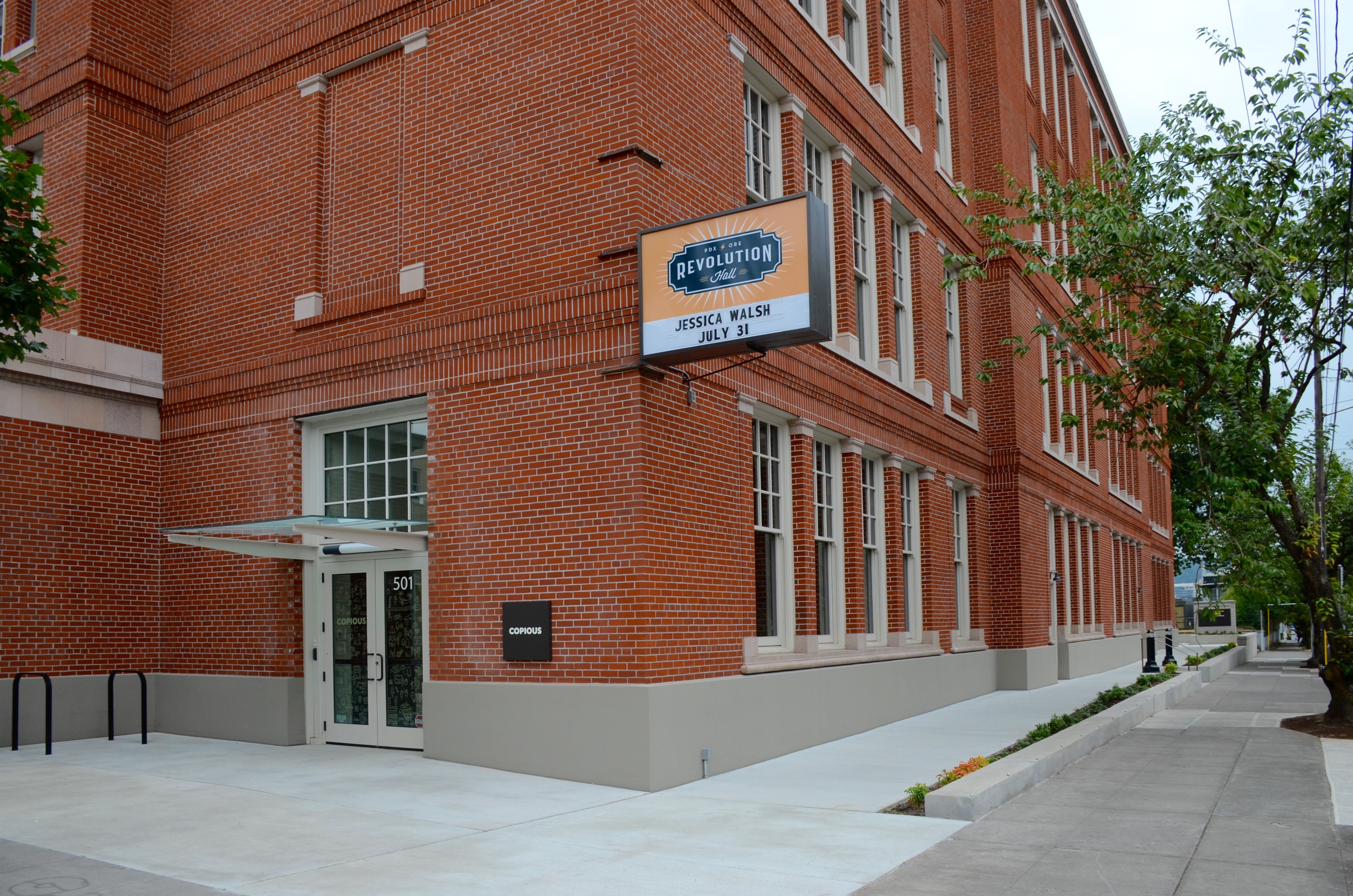
The building's northeast corner, with marquee for Revolution Hall

== Reception ==
Revolution Hall won in the "Best Patio" category, and earned second place in the "Best Music Venue" category, of Willamette Week's "Best of Portland Readers' Poll 2020".

== In popular culture ==
In the 2022 film, Metal Lords, scenes for a Battle of the Bands were filmed at Revolution Hall.

== See also ==
- Culture of Portland, Oregon
