= Howard Ramsey =

American centenarian and United States Army soldier

- Born: Howard Verne Ramsey; April 2, 1898; Rico, Colorado, U.S.
- Died: February 22, 2007 (aged 108 years, 326 days); Portland, Oregon, U.S.
- Spouse: Hilda Epling (wife)
- Relatives: Coral Ramsey (daughter)
- Military career
- Allegiance: United States of America
- Branch: United States Army
- Service years: 1916 – 1918
- Conflicts: World War I

Howard Verne Ramsey (April 2, 1898 – February 22, 2007) was one of the last surviving veterans of the First World War in the United States. Ramsey saw action in France during the war. His story was told in a 2005 speech by Vice President Dick Cheney commemorating the 75th anniversary of the United States Department of Veterans Affairs.

Ramsey was awarded the Portland, Oregon Medal, the World War Service Medal from the State of Oregon, the 75th Anniversary of World War I Medal, and two Republic Française medals (awarded to US citizens by France).

== Military service ==
Born in Rico, Colorado, he graduated from Washington High School in Portland, Oregon in 1916. While in high school, he joined the Naval Militia and was on a U. S. Naval ship, the USS Marblehead; one of the ships with him was Admiral George Dewey’s flagship in the Battle of Manila in the Spanish–American War. After high school, he hoped of enlisting in the army with his friend Harry. He and Harry were too thin, so they ate bananas and drank water so they could gain more weight. They enlisted in 1916 in Salt Lake City, Utah and served in France during the First World War. He and his friend were in different companies, but got to see each other. One of his fondest memories of France was waiting outside the military vehicle to take an officer somewhere, and a little French girl came by and sat in his car and asked him for a souvenir. He said he didn't have anything, but looked around and gave her an American penny and she gave him a little gift wrapped in tissue. As she left, he looked in the tissue and found a lock of her curly hair. He had that lock of hair until his death.

He was one of the few men who could drive a motor vehicle, so he didn't have to be on the front lines. He drove cars, trucks and motorcycles while in the war. Howard drove trucks to the lines where soldiers had been killed to help transport their bodies back to the United States. He also chauffeured officers, drove ambulances and taught men how to drive. He did his fair share of walking in the cold wearing the uncomfortable wool uniforms of the time. They brought back with them a large missile that two men had to carry (it was donated to Camp Withycombe in Clackamas, Oregon). His brother was also in the Army, but in a different company. He did get a furlough to go and visit his brother on an Indian motorcycle which he wrecked in the snow. His company had to come and pick him and the motorcycle up.

== Later life ==
He came to Portland around 1920 and worked for Hudson-Essex (later Hudson Motor Car Company). In 1922 he went to work for Western Electric (later AT&T) and retired in 1963 at the age of 65.

He married Hilda Epling in 1923 in Los Angeles, California where he had been transferred to the phone company. She was a telephone operator in Portland, Oregon and that is where they met. He allowed his wife to work for just a year so they could buy a car and they did buy a new Model A. He was transferred many times over the years, all over the west coast.

They have one daughter born in 1934 – 11 years after they married and thought perhaps there would be no children. Her name is Coral, after his buddy Harry's daughter.
