= Daniel Waldo (Oregon pioneer) =

American pioneer

Member of the Provisional Legislature of Oregon
- In office 1844–1844
- Constituency: Champoeg District

Personal details
- Born: March 22, 1800 Harrison County, Virginia
- Died: September 6, 1880 (aged 80) Salem, Oregon
- Spouse: Malinda Lunsford
- Children: John B. Waldo, William Waldo
- Occupation: farmer

Daniel Waldo (March 22, 1800 – September 6, 1880) was an American legislator in the Provisional Government of Oregon, the namesake for the Waldo Hills near Salem, Oregon, and the father of two prominent Oregon politicians. He was also a member of the Oregon Rangers militia and fought in the Cayuse War.

== Early life ==
Waldo was born in 1800 in Harrison County, Virginia to Jedediah Waldo and Mary Polly Porter. (Harrison County became part of West Virginia during the American Civil War when a portion of Virginia joined the Union as a new state.) After turning 19 years of age Waldo migrated to Missouri where he entered the lumber business. Then in 1825 he married Malinda Lunsford and they moved to St. Clair County, Missouri.

== Oregon ==
In 1843, the Waldo family traveled the Oregon Trail to Oregon Country. They traveled with their neighbors the Applegates, including Jesse Applegate. Daniel spent most of the trip in a carriage on the journey due to poor health, but the group reach the Willamette Valley in 1843 and settled east of Salem, Oregon in an area now known as the Waldo Hills. The following year Daniel was elected to serve as a legislator in the Provisional Government. Waldo was a member of the provisional government when Oregon's controversial black exclusion laws were enacted.

== Later life and family ==
With the Cayuse War in 1848, Waldo fought against the Native Americans in Eastern Oregon. Earlier he had been a member of the Oregon Rangers volunteer militia. His second oldest son William Waldo would later be president of the Oregon State Senate, and another son, John B. Waldo, would serve on the Oregon Supreme Court.

During the 1860s Waldo was involved with promoting the state's wool industry. He died in Salem, Oregon on September 10, 1880.

== Slavery and family ties ==
Some publications have speculated that Waldo brought several slaves to Oregon in 1843, including an African-American child named America. America Waldo, who married Richard Bogle in 1863 and became America Waldo Bogle, is believed by the Bogle family to be the daughter of Daniel Waldo. More recent research shows it may be Daniel's brother Joseph Waldo who brought slaves with him to Oregon in 1846, and that he is more likely to be America's father. This is based on contemporary evidence during the lifetime of Daniel and America indicating Daniel Waldo did not bring any slaves to Oregon in 1843, and on numerous reports by America Waldo and her immediate family themselves (census and death records) that she was born in Missouri in 1844, more than a year after Daniel left Missouri. Daniel, however, raised America and "acted as a father figure" to her.
