= Richard Arthur Bogle =

Pioneer and businessman (b. 1835, d. 1904)

Richard Arthur Bogle (September 7, 1835 – November 22, 1904) was an American pioneer. He was born in Jamaica, and he died in Walla Walla, Washington state. He was known as the first African-American businessman in Walla Walla, Washington.

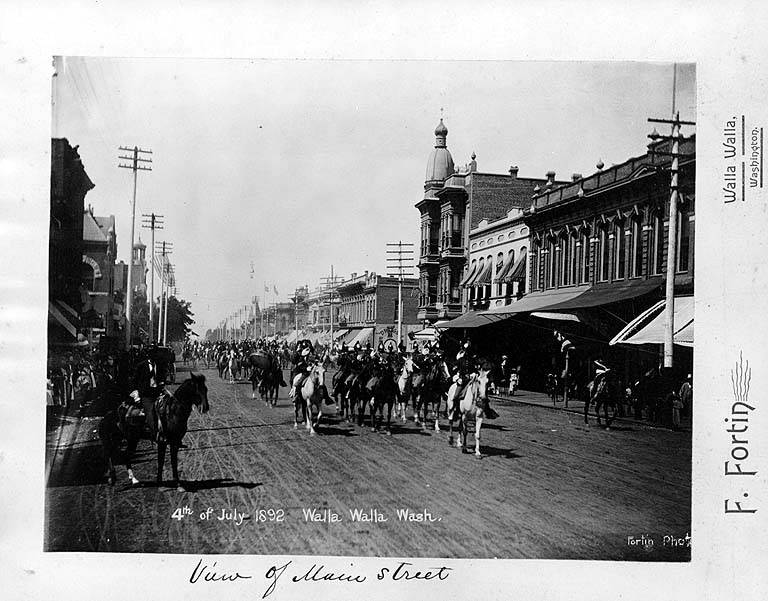
Parade for 4th of July celebration down Main Street, Walla Walla, Washington, 1892 (WASTATE 283)

== Early life ==
Bogle was born in Jamaica in 1835 to parents who were slaves until 1833. At the age of 12, he escaped by smuggling himself onto a ship bound for New York, where he remained for one year before moving to Michigan. He stayed in Michigan for a short time before joining a wagon train to the Oregon Territory at age 16 in 1851. Three years later, Bogle packed up and left to Yreka, California, and studied under Nathan Ferber, as a barber.

From there, he traveled to Deadwood, California three years later, and he mined for gold, while also opening a barbershop and a restaurant. Bogle returned to Oregon three years later, the “land of promise” in mid-October to start a barbershop in Roseburg. He followed this trade until 1862 when he moved to visit the mining camps in Florence, Elk City, and Ori Fine in Idaho before returning to the Walla Walla Valley.

== Wedding controversy and marriage to America Waldo ==
On January 1, 1863, the same day that the Emancipation Proclamation was signed by President Abraham Lincoln, Bogle married America Waldo, an Oregon pioneer from Missouri. The wedding caused controversy due to the attendance of several white guests, including Oregon Supreme Court judge Joseph G. Wilson and state legislator Daniel Waldo. Daniel, who raised America and is thought to have been her uncle, gave them "several gifts of great value with which to start their home."

Bogle and America Waldo were married in a private home by Obed Dickinson, a pastor known for advocating African American equality in Oregon who was sent by New England's American Home Missionary Society to establish a congregation in the Salem area. After officiating the wedding, Dickinson's congregation received even more criticisms and heightened racial tension in Oregon that would continue until after the Civil War.

Newspaper editor Asahel Bush called the wedding "shameful" for its "negro equality sentiment." However, The Oregonian defended Wilson and Waldo's attendance, writing that "the good feeling thus frequently called forth" by the presence of white guests "is one of the gratifications of the blacks that reconciles them to their lot."

== Later life in Walla Walla ==
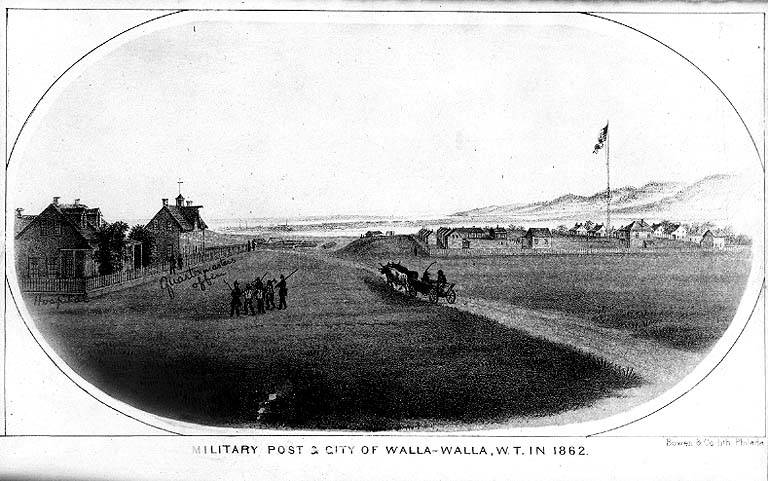
Fort Walla Walla, Washington, 1862 (WASTATE 895)

Later, Bogle and his family bought and ran a successful 200-acre ranch and settled in eastern Washington.

At the Fort Walla Walla Museum in Washington, a 15-acre park consisting of four historic exhibits and a seventeen-building pioneer village, Bogle's life is being presented by a member of the Living History troupe.

== Walla Walla businesses ==
Soon after their wedding, the Bogles moved to Walla Walla, Washington. Richard Bogle started a barbershop on Main Street, making him the first black businessman in Walla Walla on “proprietor of the tonsorial parlors at No.3 Second Street.” Racial segregation made it difficult for black visitors to find accommodation in Walla Walla, so Bogle often allowed them to stay in his shop.

He was a co-founder of the Walla Walla Savings and Loan Association. After working as a barber for several years until his health deteriorated, he turned the business over to his sons.

== Family ==
Of America Waldo and Richard Bogle's eight children, five lived into adulthood. Bogle's three oldest children appeared to have died between 1876 and 1878. His younger children—Belle, Waldo, Arthur, Warren, and Katherine—lived to adulthood. Two of their three sons followed in their father's path and became professional barbers in Portland, Oregon. Bogle's son, Waldo Bogle, moved to Portland in 1913, to operate their barbershop "in the Golden West Hotel," thankful for the "courtesy of the Oregon historical society".

Their great-grandson, also named Richard Bogle, became the second African-American city commissioner in Portland, Oregon.
