= Bogle dance =

Jamaican dance

The Bogle is a dance move originating from Kingston, Jamaica. The dance gets its name from a dancer named Bogle who danced as part of Kingston's Black Roses crew, who was in turn inspired by Barrington Levy.

The Bogle dance is a Jamaican-born dance move invented in the 1990s which involves the moving of one's body in a longitudinal, ocean-wave motion while at the same time raising and lowering one's arms, aiding the wave motion.

The dance move was engineered and created by Gerald Levy, a reggae dancehall legend. Levy and his dance move are associated with the genres of reggae, dancehall, or Jamaican music involving the soft playing of instruments such as guitars, keyboards, bass percussion, and horns, which developed in the 1960s, but did not become popular until the 1980s.

The Bogle dance move became popular along with the acceptance of reggae and then dancehall music and is now referred to as an “Old School” dance move, implying that the move was invented some time ago, or used by older people. The bogle dance move is more prevalent in reggae dance halls, a popular gathering place for dancing such as a club or ballroom. The dance move has now developed and branched off into other dances, which continue to be used in music videos such as Rihanna's hit song “Rude Boy".

== Music ==
The Bogle dance move is associated with music in the reggae genre, specifically dancehall music. Original reggae music developed from rocksteady music in the 1960s by the organ shuffle. The revolution in rocksteady music was brought forth by Bunny Lee and was characterized by fast-paced and rock-like songs. Songs that came from rocksteady include: "Say What You're Saying" (1967) by Clancy Eccles, "People Funny Boy" (1968) by Lee Scratch Perry, and The Pioneers' 1967 hit single, "Long Shot Bus' Me Bet."

Other genres that influenced Reggae's new sound were R&B, Dub, Toasting, and Ska: all of which contribute their own instruments, rhythm, or sound to the new dancehall reggae genre. With the popularity of Bob Marley and Peter Tosh’s works, people started listening to Reggae. Because of songs such as “I Shot the Sheriff,” and “One Love.” Marley's songs continue to be played on the radio today.

The turn from casually listening to reggae style music to dancing to reggae was brought forth in 1980 through Gerald Levy. Mr. Levy would create moves on the dance floor and then teach others how to do them. Dancehall moves are notable for characteristically suggestive and sensual movements of the hips and rolling of the body. Even though these dance styles quickly became popular in Jamaica, not until the 1990s was the new dancehall style of reggae music welcomed worldwide.

Levy helped the crossover to dancing by making up the exotic moves that he was later known for. This dancehall music grew to incorporate new beats and sounds like electronic music and sampling. This new style of reggae often included a DJ rapping and singing to up-tempo rhythms. This combination of music and dance quickly became a popular weekend hobby for the young people of Jamaica and, later, the world.

== Gerald Levy ==
Gerald Levy (22 August 1964 – 20 January 2005), also known as Mr. Bogle, Father Bogle, and Mr. Wacky, was the mastermind behind dance moves that he invented while enjoying himself at Jamaican dancehalls. Many friends and artists attest that Levy could effortlessly create interesting and memorable dance moves. Little did Mr. Levy know that his dances would later become popular and help fuel a new and different Jamaican lifestyle. Mr. Levy invented moves such as the Willie Bounce (named after his Black Roses Crew member Willie Haggart), Wacky Dip, Urkle Dance, Sesame Street, Bogle Dance, Pelper, LOY, Jerry Springer, Zip It Up, Hotti Hotti Bogle, World Dance, Pop Yuh Collar, Row di Boat, Out and Bad, Sweeper, and Stuckie.

Levy was murdered on January 20, 2005, at a gas station in Kingston, Jamaica. As he sat in a Ford F-150 with four other people, two men on motorcycles rode by and shot the car multiple times, sending all occupants to the hospital; only Levy and one other died of their wounds. Former creative rival over the previous year, John Hype, was suspected of the murder after his house had been fire-bombed and burnt down later that evening. People of Jamaica still consider Mr. Levy the greatest dancehall dancer of all time.

== Artists who Bogle ==
Artists who continue to perpetuate Levy's legacy of grace and creativity by giving him shout-outs in their songs include: DJ Bounty Killer, the trio Voice Mail, Elephant Man, and Beenie Man. In his song “L.O.Y.” Beenie Man sings, “Check Mr. Bogle and the Roses Crew, have a new dance they want everybody to do.” At the time of Levy's death, Beenie Man offered a million dollar bounty for Levy's murderers and said he would raise the bounty to two million dollars after a week. Beenie Man and Levy were very close friends during the time they both spent in dance-halls in the 90's.

Pop-star Rihanna has acknowledged Gerald Levy's legacy in her song and video, “Rude Boy,” in which she is seen doing the Bogle and other Jamaican dance-hall moves. In an interview Rihanna said, "We used a lot of color, but also the costumes were very Jamaican dance-hall queen type."
