= Dick Bogle =

American journalist and politician

Portland City Commissioner
- In office January 1, 1985 – December 31, 1992
- Preceded by: Charles Jordan
- Succeeded by: Charlie Hales

Personal details
- Born: October 19, 1930 Portland, Oregon
- Died: February 25, 2010 (aged 79) Vancouver, Washington
- Occupation: Police officer, reporter, news anchor, City Commissioner

Richard Waldo Bogle Jr. (October 19, 1930 – February 25, 2010) was an American journalist and politician. He was the first black television news reporter in Oregon (as well as in the Pacific Northwest as a whole) and later served two terms as a Portland city commissioner.

== Early life ==
Bogle was born in Portland in 1930 to Richard W. Bogle, a businessman, and Kathryn Hall Bogle, a journalist and activist. His great-grandparents, Richard Arthur and America Waldo Bogle, were some of the first black settlers in the Pacific Northwest. Growing up on Tibbetts Street, Bogle attended Hosford Grade School and graduated from Washington High School. He then attended Oregon State College and Vanport Extension Center (now Portland State University).

== Career ==
After college, Bogle worked as an insurance fraud investigator. In 1952, he published a jazz review and an endorsement of Adlai Stevenson for U.S. president in the Portland Challenger newspaper, which was founded by William A. Hilliard and targeted the black community. He also served as associate editor of the Challenger. He continued to write jazz and sports articles for the Portland Reporter and worked as a police officer from 1959 to 1968.

Bogle was hired as a reporter for KATU in January 1968 and assigned to cover that year's primary election. In September of that year, he interviewed Melvin Belli, and in 1973 he became an anchor of Eyewitness News. Bogle continued to work for KATU until 1982, when he was hired as City Commissioner Mildred Schwab's executive assistant.

In 1984, City Commissioner Charles Jordan, the first black commissioner (member of the city council) in Portland, announced his resignation, and Bogle entered the race to succeed him. He won 28% of the vote in the initial round, and defeated Herb Cawthorne with 55% in the runoff. This made Bogle the second African American elected to Portland's City Council. He was re-elected in 1988 but lost in 1992. His 1992 loss was attributed to several controversies, such as a $20,000 settlement on a sexual harassment claim and a $1,500 trip to Asia on the taxpayer's dime. On his final day as commissioner, he said, "I promised I would work to make Portland a city my grandchildren would be proud of. I have and it is."

After leaving politics, Bogle turned back to writing, publishing articles in DownBeat, Senior Lifestyles, The Christian Science Monitor, and The Skanner. He also took and published photos of jazz artists. He volunteered as a jazz DJ for KMHD and for the Portland Police Bureau's cold case unit.

== Personal life ==
Bogle's third marriage was to jazz singer Nola Sugai Porter in 1977, and they had three children together (in addition to two children Porter had from a previous relationship). They moved to Vancouver, Washington, in 2005. He died in Vancouver on February 25, 2010, from congestive heart failure.
