= Robert W. Bogle =

American publisher

Robert W. Bogle is the president and CEO of The Philadelphia Tribune newspaper, where he has worked for 39 years. Bogle joined The Philadelphia Tribune in 1970 selling advertising. Bogle has been a community leader for many years, and is especially active in the advancements of black Philadelphians.

Bogle attended Cheyney University in Cheyney, Pennsylvania, where he matriculated to study sociology, earning a B.A. in Urban Studies. He attended the University of Pennsylvania's Wharton School of Business and Finance to study marketing and economics.

Bogle is chairman of the Hospitals and Higher Education Facilities Authority of Philadelphia and serves as a commissioner of the Delaware River Port Authority. He contributes as a board member to the Zoological Society of Philadelphia, the Workforce Investment Board, and the African-American Chamber of Commerce.

In October 1997, Bogle was appointed as a governor to the Board of Governors of the United Way of America and board member to the Philadelphia Orchestra. In 1995, 1997 and 1999, the NNPA honored Bogle with the Russwurm Award, the highest honor to “Best Newspaper in America,” in the name of John B. Russwurm, co-founder of Freedom's Journal, the first African-American newspaper in the U.S. (1827). In June 2000, at Drexel University, Philadelphia, an honorary doctorate of Humane Letters degree was bestowed upon Bogle.
