= Joanna Bogle =

British Roman Catholic writer and journalist (*1952)

Joanna Margaret Bogle, DSG (née Nash; born September 1952) is a British Roman Catholic writer and broadcaster based in London. Bogle married a barrister and convert to Catholicism. She has written for the Richmond Herald, the Surrey Comet, the Catholic Times, the Catholic Herald, and The National Catholic Register. Bogle has been described a firebrand, believes Christians are under attack in Britain and opposed the ordination of women priests. In 2013, she was awarded a papal honour and became a Dame of the Pontifical Equestrian Order of St. Gregory the Great.

== Biography ==
Bogle worked for the Richmond Herald and later the Surrey Comet newspapers after leaving school. She has written for the Catholic Times and the Catholic Herald. In 1996, Bogle was described by Catholic writer Peter Stanford as "a forceful, eloquent and youthful firebrand who has made it her business, with some success, to act as a counter-balance to Cristina Odone on the chat-show and soundbite circuit."

Bogle is a founder member of the Association for Catholic Women in England and contributes to The National Catholic Register. She is married to James Bogle, a barrister and convert to Catholicism. She has a degree in theology.

In 2013, she became a Dame of the Pontifical Equestrian Order of St. Gregory the Great, a Papal merit award whose recipients are styled "DSG". The award is not connected to Orders, decorations, and medals of the United Kingdom. Bogle does not have a television but contributes to EWTN Global Catholic Network, a Catholic television and radio network "dedicated to the advancement of truth as defined by the Magisterium of the Catholic Church, [...] to serve the orthodox belief and teaching of the Church as proclaimed by the supreme Pontiff and his predecessors."

Her biography of 19th-century humanitarian Caroline Chisholm, The Emigrant's Friend, was published in 1993. A short biography, "Courage and Conviction" (2013) concerns Mother Riccarda Beauchamp Hambrough and Sister Katherine Flanagan, two British Bridgettine nuns who helped to hide 50 Jewish refugees in Rome during the Second World War.

== Opinions ==
A conservative who believes the Catholic Church should advocate fundamental truths rather than liberal attitudes, Bogle has opposed the ordination of women priests. In 1999, Bogle opposed the recommendation of the Broadcasting Standards Commission to use BCE and CE in place of BC and AD. She was a member of the National Viewers' and Listeners' Association, and in 1987 was described as "Mary Whitehouse's second-in-command" by the London Daily News.

In 1998, she criticised the decision of the Church to honour Rupert Murdoch with a knighthood: "It sends out the message that you can make a living out of something – soft pornography – that is regarded by the Church as sinful, and yet you can be awarded for it. The Knighthood of St. Gregory is supposed to be about honour and chivalry and splendour. To give it to Murdoch is ridiculous and wrong."

She believes Catholics, and Christians generally, are under sustained assault in the UK and should assert themselves. In March 2009, Bogle participated in a debate on Channel 4 News with Dr Rachel Baggaley, head of Christian Action's HIV programme, and presenter Jon Snow, on the Church's policy towards AIDS in Africa. Snow described it as the fiercest debate in which he ever participated.

== Publications ==
- Celebrating Our Heritage (Paperback – 1988)
- Who Lies Where? (A Lamp guide) (Paperback – 24 February 1989)
- Heart for Europe (with James Bogle, Paperback – December 1991)
- Prayers from the Heart for the Feasts of the Year (with Gill Onions, Paperback – April 1992)
- Prayers from the Heart for Everyday Things (Paperback – November 1992)
- When the Summer Ended (with Cecylia Wolkowinska, Paperback – December 1992)
- Book of Feasts & Seasons (Paperback – 1 January 1993)
- Caroline Chisholm: The Emigrant's Friend (Paperback – June 1994)
- Come on In, It's Awful (Paperback – June 1994)
- Does the Church Oppress Women? (Paperback – 1 July 1999)
- Martyrs of Uganda (Paperback – 1 March 2000)
- Engaged to be Married (Paperback – July 2000)
- Fr Werenfried – A Life (Paperback – 1 January 2001)
- The First Croydon Airport 1915–1928: v. 1 (with Bob Learmonth, Douglas Cluett and John Teasdale, Paperback – 1 October 2001)
- Croydon Airport: From War to Peace (with Douglas Cluett & Bob Learmonth, Paperback – 1 January 2003)
- One Corner of London: A History of St. Bede's, Clapham Park (Paperback – September 2003)
- The Church in Nightingale Square (Paperback – 20 June 2005)
- (editor) The Pope Benedict Code, Gracewing, 2006
- A Yearbook of Seasons and Celebrations (Paperback – 1 October 2007)
- St John Mary Vianney, the Cure of Ars: A Parish Priest for All the World (Paperback – 1 September 2009)
- English Catholic Heroines (Paperback – 15 October 2009)
- A Nun with a Difference: The Life and Letters of Sister Mary Alban FC (Paperback – November 2009)
- Lent and Easter: Catholic Customs and Traditions (Paperback – 11 January 2010)
- Advent and Christmas: Catholic Customs and Traditions (Paperback – 24 September 2010)
- Courage and Conviction. Pius XII, the Bridgettine Nuns, and the Rescue of Jews. Mother Riccarda Hambrough and Mother Katherine Flanagan (Paperback, Gracewing, 27 June 2013) ISBN 978-0852447444
