= Bush's Pasture Park =

Public park and botanical garden in Salem, Oregon

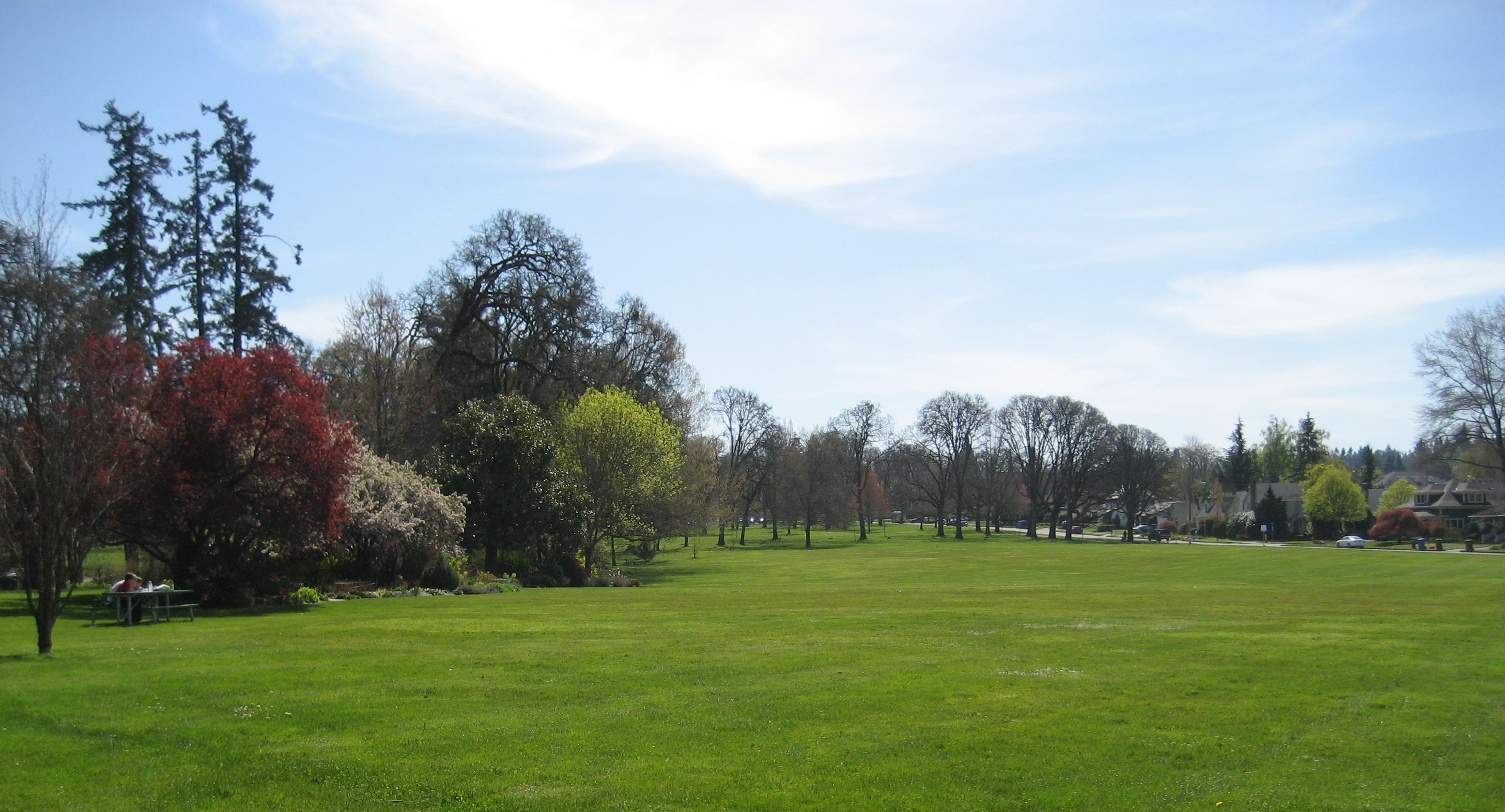
- Open field at the park in the spring

- Location within Oregon Location within the United States
- Type: Public, city
- Location: 600 Mission St., SE, Salem, Oregon
- Coordinates: 44°55′54″N 123°2′17″W
- Area: 90.5 acres (36.6 ha)
- Operator: City of Salem
- Status: Open
- Website: Official website
- Asahel Bush House
- U.S. National Register of Historic Places
- U.S. Historic district – Contributing property
- Location within Oregon Location within the United States
- Area: 90.5 acres (36.6 ha)
- Built: 1878
- Architect: Wilbur F. Boothby
- Architectural style: Italianate
- Part of: Gaiety Hill – Bush's Pasture Park Historic District (ID86002849)
- NRHP reference No.: 74001700
- Added to NRHP: January 21, 1974

Bush's Pasture Park (90.5 acres) is a public park and botanical garden in Salem, Oregon, United States. It is the site of the Asahel Bush House, which was placed on the National Register of Historic Places in 1974, and is now operated as the Bush House Museum.

== Bush House Museum ==
The park and Italianate Victorian house date to 1877–1878 when they were built for Asahel Bush, founder of the Oregon Statesman newspaper and subsequently of the Ladd and Bush Bank. In 1882 Bush added a still-extant conservatory for his daughters, claimed to be the first greenhouse west of the Mississippi River. It is now filled with period plants.

Owned by the City of Salem, the house has been open to the public since 1953 and is now operated by the Salem Art Association as the Bush House Museum. The museum features Victorian period furnishings and original wallpapers, and is open for guided tours from Wednesdays through Sundays. There is no admission fee.

== Bush Barn Art Center ==
The estate's barn that was used to house farm equipment is now the Bush Barn Art Center, which is operated by the Salem Art Association. The Center features two contemporary art exhibition galleries, the A.N. Bush Gallery for exhibits by regional, national and international artists, and the smaller Focus Gallery for local artists. There is also a crafts gallery with consigned works for sale. Admission is free.

The Art Association also organizes the Salem Art Fair and Festival in the park each year on the third weekend of July.

== Park features ==
Today the park contains trails, picnic areas, playgrounds, tennis courts, natural groves of old Oregon white oak trees, cherry and apple orchards, and a rose garden with over 2,000 roses. Willamette University's McCulloch Stadium (football, track and field), Spec Keene Stadium (baseball) and cross country course are located in the park, hosting a variety of university and community events, such as the Salem Jaycees' Kids Relays and the amateur soccer team the Cascade Surge of the USL Premier Development League.

The park also has a soap box derby track that is home to the Salem Soap Box Derby and downhill skateboarding events.

The park is open daily to the public.

== See also ==
- List of botanical gardens in the United States
