= Andrew Nisbet Bogle =

Scottish minister

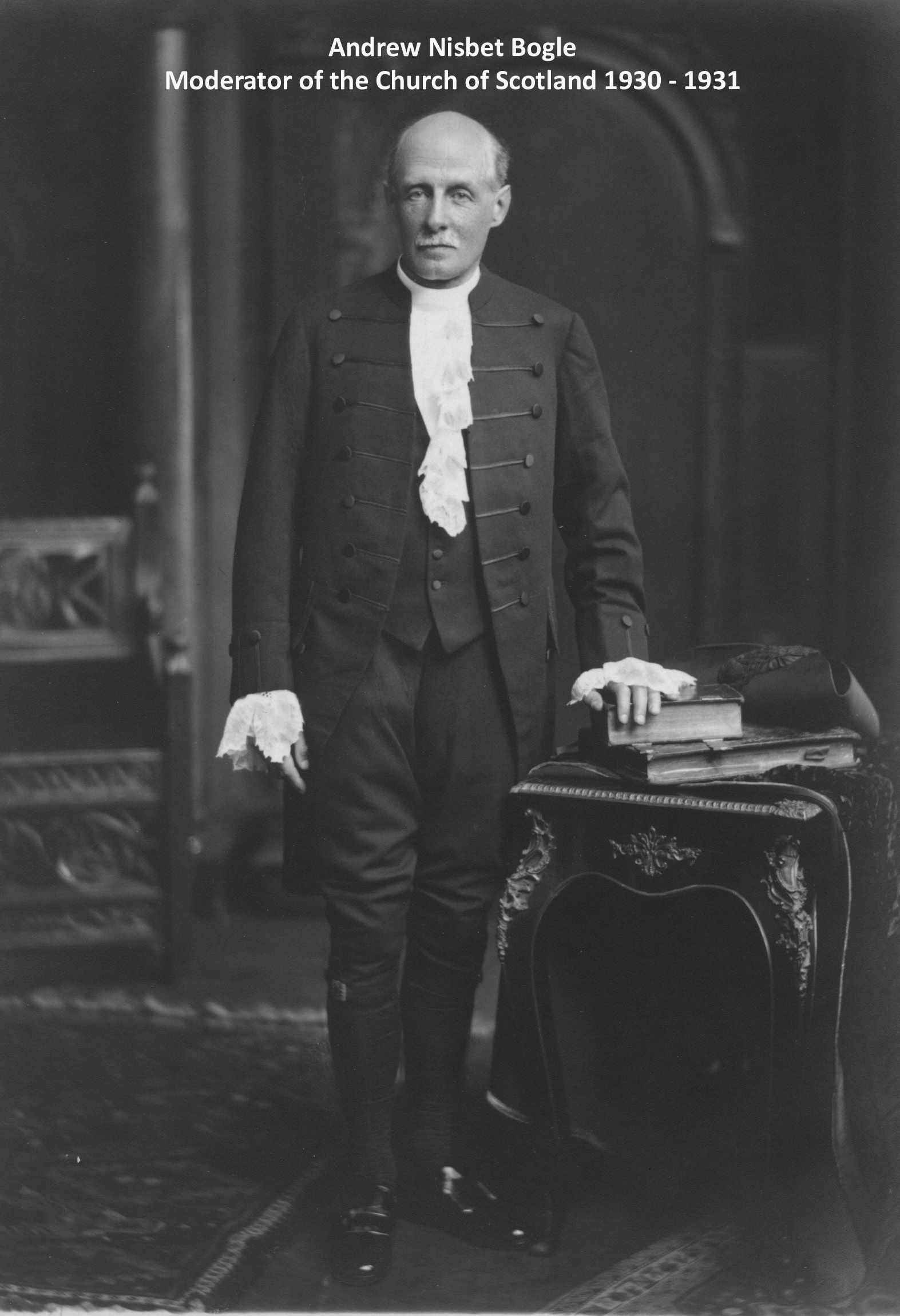
- Born: 28 June 1868; Callander, Scotland
- Died: 5 Aug 1957 (aged 89); Edinburgh, Scotland
- Office: Moderator of the General Assembly of the Church of Scotland

Andrew Nisbet Bogle (28 June 1868 – 5 August 1957) was a Scottish minister of the Free Church of Scotland who moved to the Church of Scotland as an administrator and then served as Moderator of the General Assembly of the Church of Scotland in 1930.

== Life ==
He was born on 28 June 1868 in Callander in central Scotland, the son of Catherine (née Nisbet) and Reverend Andrew Bogle a Free Church minister. He was educated at the Royal High School, Edinburgh then studied theology at the University of Edinburgh, graduating with an MA in 1890. He was licensed by the Free Church Presbytery in 1894. He became an assistant in St James Free Church in Edinburgh then in 1896 was ordained to Larbert Free Church. In 1903 he was translated to North Leith Free Church on Ferry Road. During this period he lived at Rosemount 214 Ferry Road. He resigned in 1916 to become an administrator at the Church of Scotland Offices. In 1923 he was awarded an honorary doctorate (DD) from the University of Edinburgh.

He never actually served as a minister in the Church of Scotland but nevertheless was chosen as Moderator in 1930. In May 1937 he was one of the select group of former moderators invited to the coronation of King George VI in Westminster Abbey in London.

He died on 5 August 1957.

== Family ==
In 1896 he married Hellen Milne McCulloch.
