= Bogle (dancer) =

Jamaican dancehall dancer and choreographer

Gerald Levy (22 August 1964 – 20 January 2005), better known as Bogle and also as Bogle Dancer, Mr Bogle, Father Bogle and Mr Wacky, was a Jamaican dancehall dancer and choreographer. Beenie Man called Bogle "the greatest dancer of all time" and he is recognised as "part of the foundation and as an icon inside of dancehall culture." Bogle created more dancehall moves than any other figure; he is best known for creating the Bogle dance which is named after him. His stage name, Bogle, is a reference to Paul Bogle a National Hero of Jamaica.

== Early life ==
Gerald Levy was born on 22 August 1964 in Trenchtown, West Kingston in the capital of Jamaica. He was educated at Charlie Smith All Age and spent a brief period at St George's College. As a child in the 1970s he appeared on Louise Bennett's television show Ring Ding and in the 1980s he danced on the Saturday evening television programme Where It's At, both on the Jamaican Broadcasting Corporation.

== Career ==
Bogle was called the "Dancehall Master" and was best known for his dancing. He had the ability to seemingly create dances without effort and his dances would become extremely popular. Creator of the Willie Bounce (named after Bogle's friend and Black Roses Crew member Willie Haggart), Wacky Dip, Urkle Dance, Sesame Street, Bogle Dance, Pelper, LOY, Jerry Springer, Zip It Up, Hotti Hotti Bogle, World Dance, Pop Yuh Collar, Row di Boat, Out and Bad, Sweeper, and many other popular dances. He was also in Belly.

In the 1990s, Levy created the Bogle dance, the scene's first crossover dance move. He was also a major influence on breakout artists such as Elephant Man and Beenie Man, who gave shout-outs to Levy in songs like "Row Like a Boat": "Seh Mr. Bogle have di brand new style/Come get di style, come get di style."

== Death ==
On the night of 20 January 2005, after getting into an altercation with Beenie Man and his entourage, Bogle and four others were in his car at a gas station, when two men on a bicycle rode by, shooting into the vehicle. The passengers were rushed to Kingston Public Hospital, where the 40-year-old Levy was pronounced dead. The home of John Hype, Levy's creative rival over the previous year, was burned to the ground just hours later. In the wake of Bogle's murder, Beenie Man offered a $1 million reward for the capture of the killers.

== Legacy ==
Bogle's work lives on throughout the dancehall community as Jamaica's greatest dancer of all time. Many dancehall artists and dancers respect "Father Bogle" and give him shout-outs in songs. Popular DJ Bounty Killer credits Bogle for making him want to dance. In 2005, the trio Voice Mail had the hit single "Wacky Dip" on the Junkanoo Riddim, which included lyrics that have proven to be true thus far: "Mr. Wacky is gone, but his dancing lives on". Elephant Man who previously recorded songs for Bogle's dances had the hit single "Willie Bounce" which is by far one of Bogle's most popular dances. Buju Banton also recorded a song called "Bogle Dance", which was inspired by Bogle. In R&B singer Rihanna's music video Rude Boy, she is seen doing "The Bogle".
