= Asahel Bush =

American businessman (1824–1913)

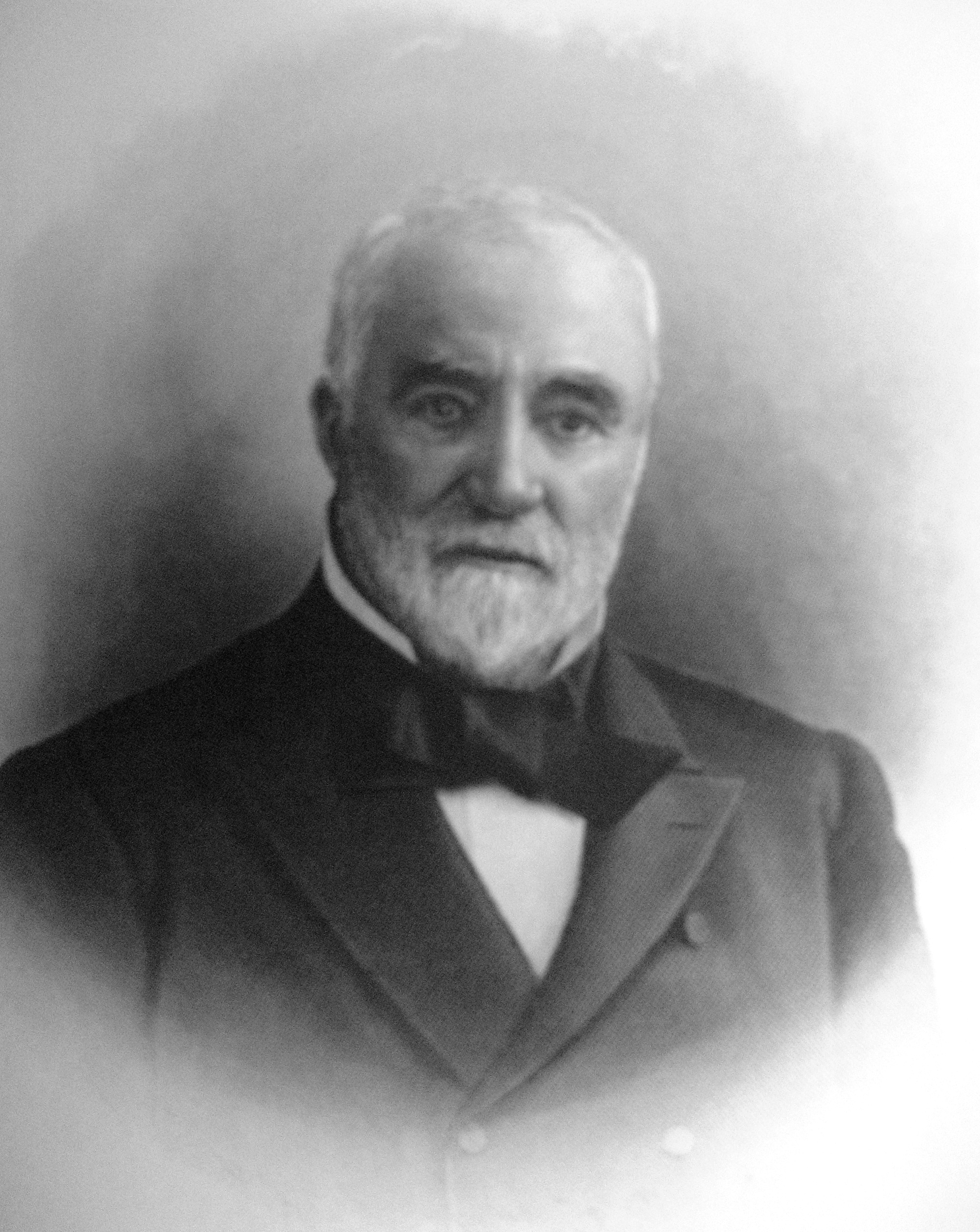
- Born: June 4, 1824; Westfield, Massachusetts
- Died: December 23, 1913 (aged 89); Salem, Oregon
- Occupation: Publisher
- Spouse: Eugenia Zieber

Asahel Bush (June 4, 1824 – December 23, 1913) was an American newspaper publisher and businessman in Salem, Oregon. As publisher of the Oregon Statesman newspaper, he moved the paper to Salem when the territorial capital moved to that city. A Massachusetts native, Bush became the first official printer for the state of Oregon, and his estate is now a city park.

== Early life ==
Asahel Bush was born in Westfield, Massachusetts, on June 4, 1824. His parents, Asahel Bush Sr. and Sally Noble Bush, were of English descent. The younger Asahel attended public school and later Westfield Academy, then at the age of 17 moved to Saratoga Springs, New York, where he became an apprentice printer. Bush later worked for a newspaper before studying law. He passed the bar in 1850 in Massachusetts, but soon left for the Oregon Territory by the steamship Panama, taking the Isthmus of Panama route.

== Oregon ==
Bush arrived in Oregon in late 1850 at Portland and settled in Oregon City. Once his printing press arrived, he started the Oregon Statesman newspaper in March 1851. In 1853, the capital was moved to Salem and Bush moved the newspaper there as well, where it would later become the Salem Statesman Journal.

In the middle of the century newspapers were partisan instruments used to further political parties. Bush's use of his paper gave him the nickname of "Bushy Bush" and he often sparred with the rival party's newspaper The Oregonian edited by Thomas J. Dryer. Bush quietly disfavored slavery in Oregon. But as an enthusiast for popular sovereignty he supported the right of white male voters to determine the question. He also strongly opposed abolitionists' moralistic and universal opposition to slavery and their support for what he termed "negro equality". For example, he published articles disparaging the abolitionist Obed Dickinson, a minister at the Salem Congregationalist Church. In one such article, the Statesman wrote, "The continuation of Mr. Dickinson's anti-slavery and negro sympathy preachings was calculated only to prevent the growth of the church, and retard the spread of religion." Bush supported the 1857 Oregon Constitutional ban on Blacks immigrating to Oregon. In 1859, Bush became the first official printer for the state of Oregon. As a Douglas Democrat, he opposed the election of Lincoln but ended up supporting the Union during the American Civil War. He left the newspaper business in 1863 when he sold the newspaper.

In 1867, Bush along with William S. Ladd founded the Ladd and Bush Bank in Salem. Ten years later Bush would buy out Ladd and become the sole proprietor of the financial institution. He remained active in politics and was a member of the state Democratic Party's central committee, including time as the chairperson, and in 1892 was a delegate to the Democratic National Convention.

== Later life and family ==
In 1854, Asahel Bush married Eugenia Zieber of Salem, with whom he would father four children: Sally, Eugenia, Estelle, and Asahel III who would be known as A. N. Bush. Eugenia was the daughter of one of his printer employees, and she would die at the age of 30 in 1863. Bush served as a trustee of Willamette University and as a regent to the University of Oregon. Asahel Bush II died on December 23, 1913, at the age of 89 in Salem and was buried at Salem Pioneer Cemetery. His estate is now preserved as Bush's Pasture Park and his home, Asahel Bush House, is on the National Register of Historic Places.
