= Kathryn Hall Bogle =

American social worker, activist, and freelance journalist

Kathryn Hall Bogle (December 24, 1906 – August 2003) was an American social worker, activist, and freelance journalist in Portland, Oregon. She was the first African American journalist to be paid for an article in The Oregonian of Portland. She was presented a Lifetime Achievement Award by the Portland Association of Black Journalists in 1993.

== Biography ==
Born December 24, 1906, in the Oklahoma Territory, she lived in Kansas City before coming to the Pacific Northwest with her mother, Lillian Finley Hall. They settled in Portland where she graduated from Washington High School.

Bogle was denied employment at many locations in Portland, including a telephone company, light company, and power company; she was also denied employment as an elevator operator and as office help. She faced discrimination in academia and was refused admissions to all the business schools in Portland, Oregon; upon visiting Behnke-Walker Business College, she was told she could not register because of her race. Bogle notes that, at the time, "We found that no Portland hospital will accept the application of a Negro girl for nurse training; there are no Negroes in the employ of the state of Oregon; Negros have not one representative in the clerical departments of the city." Eventually she found employment at the department store of Meier and Frank in the beauty shop.

In 1927, Kathryn Baker married Richard Bogle, a student studying pharmacy at Oregon Agricultural College (now Oregon State University). After facing multiple "obstacles" Richard Bogle dropped out and worked as a bellman in the Portland Hotel. They resided on Southeast Tibbetts Street and raised their two children, Richard (better known as "Dick") and Linda.

Bogle was the first Black journalist to be paid for an article in the Portland newspaper, The Oregonian. She was a freelance journalist because she could not find employment as a full-time journalist in Oregon. She wrote articles for many black newspapers including the Pittsburgh Courier, the Northwest Enterprise in Seattle, the Portland Observer, the Portland Skanner, and the Portland Challenger. "An American Negro Speaks of Color," Bogle's best-known article, was sold to The Oregonian in 1937. Kathryn's article described her personal experiences growing up in Portland, Oregon including the difficulties of being black in Oregon with a focus on education and employment. Along with her career as a journalist, Bogle also worked as a social worker for seventeen years with the Boys and Girls Aid Society. For seven years she worked as a caseworker at Good Samaritan Hospital & Medical Center, and in 1948, she assisted victims who were displaced by the Vanport flood.
