= Mims =

Mims or MIMS may refer to:

== Education ==
- Manchester Institute for Mathematical Sciences, School of Mathematics, University of Manchester, England
- Mandarin Immersion Magnet School, Houston, Texas, United States
- Mandya Institute of Medical Sciences, Mandya, Karnataka, India
- MediCiti Institute of Medical Sciences, near Hyderabad, Telangana, India

== Science and medicine ==
- Aster MIMS, hospital in Kozhikode, Kerala, India
- Membrane-introduction mass spectrometry
- Mechanically interlocked molecular architectures
- MIMS Ireland, a pharmaceuticals guide in Ireland
- Monthly Index of Medical Specialities, a guide to pharmaceuticals

== People ==
- Mims (name)
- Mims (rapper) (born 1981), American rapper
- Mims (wrestler), professional wrestler

== Places ==
- Historic Mims Park, park in Atlanta, Georgia
- Hotel Mims, a hotel in Mims, Florida
- Mims, Florida, United States
- Mims House, historic home in Eugene, Oregon

== Other uses ==
- Fort Mims massacre, 1813 massacre at Fort Mims in Alabama
- Municipal Infrastructure Management System, used in Canada
- Our Mims (1974–2003), racehorse

== See also ==
- MIM (disambiguation)
- Mimms (disambiguation)
