= Racing to Change =

“Racing to Change" is an exhibition organized by the Oregon Black Pioneers that uses a variety of media to highlight the lives and activism of Black Oregonians during the 1960s and 1970s. The exhibition first opened in 2018, in partnership with the Oregon Historical Society, under the name "Racing to Change: Oregon's Civil Rights Years." In 2019, Oregon Black Pioneers partnered with the University of Oregon Museum of Natural and Cultural History (MNCH) and expanded the content to include stories from Lane County, Oregon. The expanded exhibit, "Racing to Change: Oregon's Civil Rights Years—The Eugene Story" opened at the MNCH in October 2019. Incorporating videos, photographs, and documents, the exhibitions became available to viewers online after the 2020 closing of the physical locations (see "External Links" below).

== Exhibition content ==
The content includes a variety of media and historical archives, including interviews, transcripts, video testimony, documents, and photographs. The exhibitions situate Oregon's history within national and local campaigns for racial justice in the 1960s and 1970s, discussing local community organizers alongside Black icons like Martin Luther King Jr. and Muhammad Ali. Some of these local activists include Willie C. Mims, one of the first Black residents of Eugene; and Wiley Griffon, the first Black person to work at the University of Oregon. The exhibition also features student activists who fought against racial discrimination in higher education. Students like these worked to diversify Portland State University's curriculum by establishing Black Studies (see: Africana Studies) degrees. Their stories illustrate civil rights advocacy that historians did not formally document in Oregon's state archives.

The displays also emphasize that despite the region's comparative lack of racial diversity, the civil rights movement existed in the Pacific Northwest, affecting Oregon cities like Eugene and Portland. Throughout the late 1960s, Kent Ford and other Oregon activists formed local chapters of the Black Panther Party and the Black Berets in both Eugene and Portland. Although small, these groups forged community movements and programs to organize against racism in their communities and support Black residents. The exhibitions explain these groups' activism and feature stories highlighting their work, including how the Eugene chapter of the Black Panther Party created a free breakfast program for children and started a liberation school to teach Black history.

The Eugene exhibition includes firsthand accounts of Oregon's civil rights movement from local activists, members of Eugene's Black community, like Lyllye Reynolds-Parker, and University of Oregon students. It also features two displays unique to the Eugene location: information on the university's new Black cultural center and the original Oregon Constitution. The curators featured the 1857 constitution for one month because it contains the Black exclusion clause, which lawmakers upheld until 1926 [2]. Notably, Oregonians did not remove the document's exclusionary language until 2000.

Curators incorporated interactive experiences in the downtown Portland exhibition. Throughout the displays, speakers played hits by Black artists, like Aretha Franklin's "R-E-S-P-E-C-T ", that many radio stations and stores refused to play in the 1960s and 1970s. The exhibition also promoted community programs for visitors to engage with, including open discussions between present-day activists and advocates from the 1960s to 1970s.

== Exhibition locations ==
=== Portland ===
The Oregon Black Pioneers developed the downtown Portland exhibition with the Oregon Historical Society, opening the original "Racing to Change: Oregon's Civil Rights Years" on January 15, 2018. "Racing to Change" was the Oregon Black Pioneers' fourth exhibition curated with the Oregon Historical Society, attracting 45,000 viewers by the time it closed on June 24, 2018.

=== Eugene ===
In Eugene, the Oregon Black Pioneers curated "Racing to Change: The Eugene Story" with the University of Oregon Museum of Cultural and Natural History. The opening on October 12, 2019, coincided with the opening of the university's Lyllye Reynolds-Parker Black Cultural Center. The museum celebrated the exhibition's opening with a performance from the Powerhouse Praise Team, a local gospel choir. Additionally, the opening featured speeches from Oregon Senator James Manning Jr. and museum exhibition director Ann Craig, among others.

Using the Portland exhibition as a foundation, Oregon Black Pioneers and the MNCH added localized information specific to Eugene and the University of Oregon. Covering 1,100 square feet, the Eugene exhibition won a 2020 Oregon Heritage Excellence Award from the Oregon Parks and Recreation Department before its temporary closure in May 2020.

=== Satellite exhibitions ===
Smaller versions of the exhibition appeared as ten-foot kiosks in several Oregon venues [3]. The Interstate Firehouse Cultural Center Gallery in North Portland hosted one of these pop-up exhibitions between March 12 and April 12, 2020.

=== Online ===
The Oregon Historical Society has published an online version of the Portland exhibition, which allows viewers to virtually explore the physical exhibit through 360-degree/3D technology. The University of Oregon Museum of Natural and Cultural History also moved the Eugene exhibition online in early 2020 to maintain access for audiences after the COVID-19 pandemic led to Oregon's state-mandated shut down. The exhibition's curators expressed that they wanted people to still have access to the information in light of the Black Lives Matter protests in summer 2020. This was the first virtual exhibit produced by the Museum of Natural and Cultural History. Its online version uses a traditional website format instead of panoramic imaging and includes an educator's guide for grades 6–12 to help teachers lead their classes through the material.

== Curators ==
=== Intentions ===
The exhibitions' curators — including Oregon Black Pioneers, directors, and museum leaders — stated their intentions to raise awareness about the contributions of Black Oregonians and for viewers to connect history to their present-day lives. They reported wanting to create a safe space for Black people and an informative space for White people, ultimately inspiring visitors to engage in contemporary activism.

=== Contributors ===
The Oregon Black Pioneers is a Salem-based organization dedicated to teaching Oregon's racial history. It is a branch of the Oregon Historical Society, but also produces exhibits with other organizations. The Oregon Black Pioneers has curated a series of four exhibitions with the Oregon Historical Society, chronologically following Oregon's racist history (see: Racism in Oregon) and the origins of its Black community. The first installment of this series appeared in 2011 and features historical content as early as 1788. "Racing to Change" is the fourth and final exhibit in this series, focusing on racism and the Oregon Civil Rights Movement of the 1960s and 1970s. Two of Oregon Black Pioneers' prominent board members, Kim Moreland and Gwen Carr, served as the "Racing to Change" exhibit's co-leaders.
