= Wiley Griffon =

American streetcar operator (1867–1913)

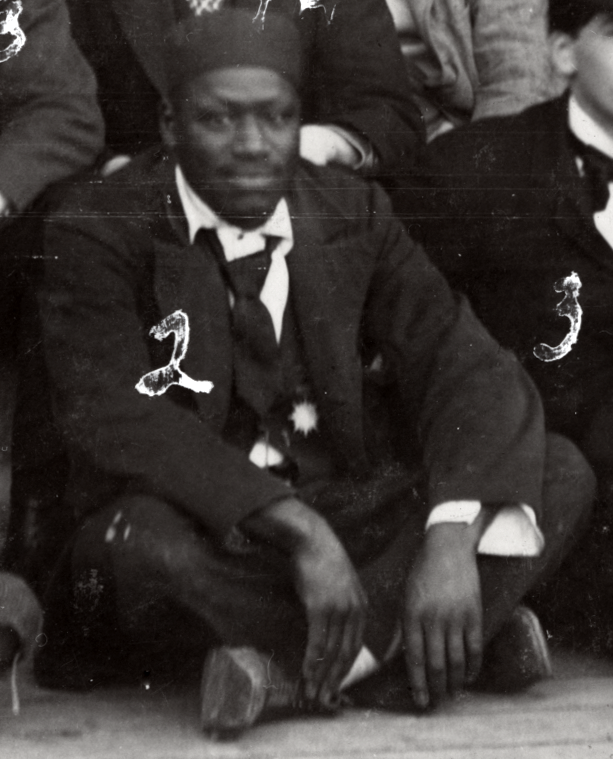
- Griffon, c. 1896
- Born: 1867
- Died: June 26, 1913 (aged 46); Eugene, Oregon, United States

Wiley Griffon (1867 – June 26, 1913) was an American streetcar operator and resident of Eugene, Oregon, United States. Little is known about Griffon's early life, but after being employed by the businessman Henry W. Holden, he moved to Eugene in 1890 to operate the street railway. After resigning from the position in 1894, he held a number of occupations elsewhere in Oregon. Griffon died in 1913 of a gastrointestinal illness after failing to recover from a surgery.

Although Griffon lived during a period of racism, scholars found that he held a favorable reputation and was generally accepted within the Eugene community. Several public displays dedicated to Griffon have been installed in Eugene, including a monument at his burial site, a mural, and a street named after him.

== Biography ==
Wiley Griffon was born in 1867. Little is known about his early life, and sources disagree on his place of birth. (Note: Scott Maben of The Register-Guard wrote that Griffon was born in the state of Illinois, possibly to a slave family. According to Mark Harris, a Lane Community College instructor, he could have been from North or South Carolina.) According to his obituary in the Morning Register, he was employed by the family of Henry W. Holden, a Texan businessman, at age 19.

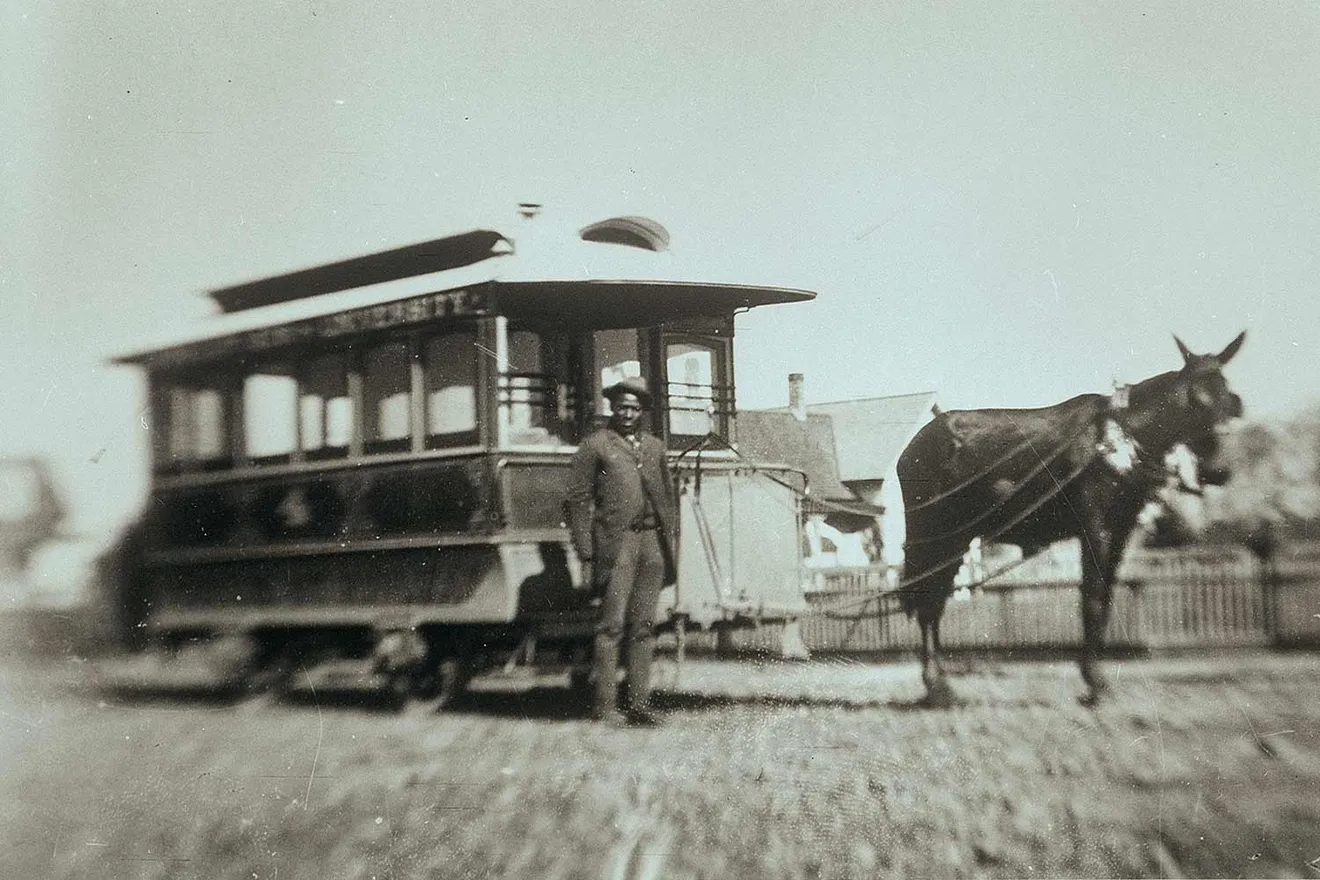
Griffon drove Eugene's first streetcar in the 1890s. (pictured c. 1893)

Griffon moved to Eugene, Oregon, in 1890, despite exclusion laws in the state of Oregon forbidding free Black people from settling there. Holden constructed a mule-drawn railway in 1891, and Griffon became the first operator in Eugene's streetcar system, as well as the only African-American streetcar operator of his time in Oregon. A resident recalled that Griffon often stopped his streetcar outside Villard Hall, on the University of Oregon campus, to pick up passengers before driving towards the Southern Pacific Railroad depot. Although he resigned from the railway after three years, in July 1894, he later acted as a substitute operator. After it was sold to W. B. Dennis in September 1900, The Oregon Daily Journal reported that Griffon often wholly managed the system.

Griffon lived in a house along the Mill Race, and was the first Black property owner on record in Eugene. He was employed variously across his life, including as a janitor at the University of Oregon's Friendly Hall – where he was the university's first African-American employee – as a waiter at Katherine Sterrett Munra's restaurant and in the railway, and in other roles in Eugene and elsewhere in Oregon. He sustained various injuries while engaged in manual labor.

To remove several tumors in his back and neck, Griffon underwent a surgery which he did not fully recover from. The owners of the Elks Club, where he had been employed at the time, hired a caretaker for him. After a week of gastrointestinal illness, Griffon died in his home on June 26, 1913. The Elks Club helped arrange for his burial. The Branstetter Chapel held his funeral on June 27, and Griffon was buried within what is now the Eugene Masonic Cemetery. (Note: The Eugene Daily Guard reported at the time that Griffon was buried in the "A. F. and A. M. cemetery".)

== Legacy ==
Wiley Griffon Way (highlighted in red) was named in 2019.

Griffon lived in Eugene during a period of overt racism; however, the historian Jennifer O'Neal found that "evidence suggests he weathered those times positively" and held a favorable reputation. Several local newspapers described Griffon in obituaries as a noteworthy member of the Eugene community. The sociologist Douglas Card said that although these articles applied racial stereotypes, they nonetheless indicated Griffon's acceptance by Eugene residents. The historian Richard Thompson, in his book about Oregon's streetcars, wrote that he "earned a special place in Oregon history."

Several public displays dedicated to Griffon have been installed in Eugene. To highlight the history of public transportation in Eugene, the Lane Transit District installed an exhibit in Eugene Station for its first anniversary in 1999, including a display on Griffon. Cheri Turpin and Mark Harris, a Lane Community College (LCC) instructor, installed a monument dedicated to Griffon in the Eugene Masonic Cemetery in 2013. They raised funds for the project over 15 years, receiving contributions from the Black student union at LCC, the Eugene Water and Electric Board (EWEB), and the Lane Education Service District.

In 2017, the EWEB partnered with the local NAACP branch to construct a sign about Griffon at its headquarters, located at the former site of Griffon's house. In 2019, a public mural depicting Griffon was painted by the artist Ila Rose, with support from Turpin and Harris. The city of Eugene also held an online vote that year to name newly constructed streets along its downtown riverfront. Griffon was shortlisted, and eventually selected as one of three namesakes for the streets.
