= Emerald Express =

BRT system in Eugene and Springfield, Oregon

Emerald Express (EmX)
- Green Line, Gateway Line

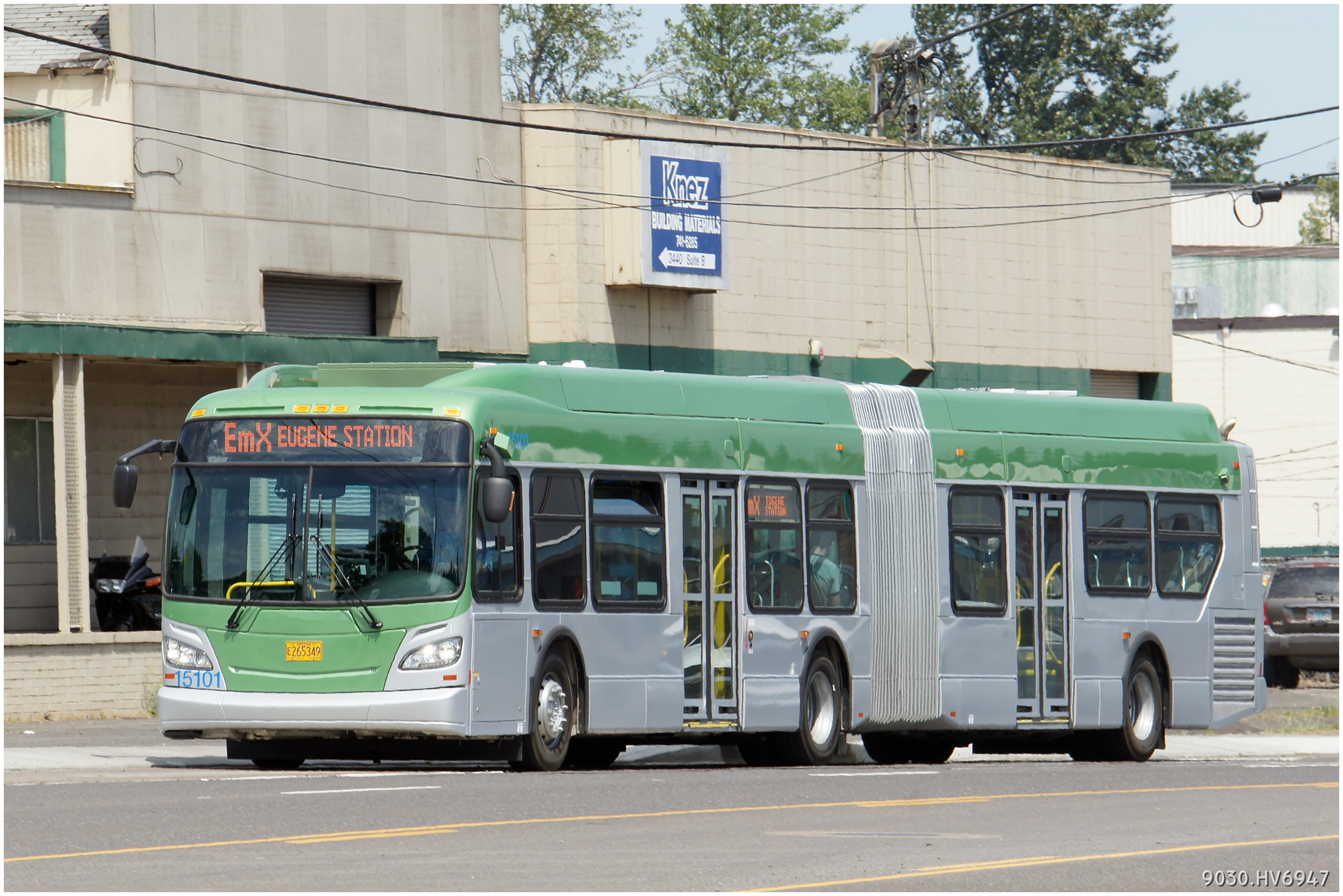

Overview
- Operator: Lane Transit District
- Status: Operational
- Began service: January 14, 2007
- Predecessors: Route 11 Thurston

Route
- Route type: Bus rapid transit
- Locale: Eugene and Springfield, Oregon
- Start: Commerce Station
- Via: West 11th Avenue, Franklin Boulevard, Pioneer Parkway
- End: Gateway Mall
- Length: 13 miles (21 km)
- Stations: 37

Service
- Frequency: 10–20 minutes
- Weekend frequency: 15–30 minutes
- Annual patronage: 2,786,403 (2024)
- Timetable: LTD Route 103 (EMX)

The Emerald Express (EmX) is a bus rapid transit system in the Eugene-Springfield metropolitan area in Oregon, United States. It is provided by the Lane Transit District (LTD) which is the public transit authority in Lane County, Oregon.

LTD chose bus rapid transit after a review process in which several transportation options, including light rail, were considered. It was decided that the BRT option was the best fit for Eugene-Springfield's size and current transportation needs.

The first route, named the Green Line, was opened in early 2007, connecting downtown Springfield to downtown Eugene. There are ten stops along the 4-mile (6.4 km) route, including the University of Oregon.

Less than a year later, ridership had doubled in the corridor, and the city of Eugene was nominated for the 2008 Sustainable Transportation Award, and received an honorable mention. An extension was opened on January 9, 2011, connecting EmX to the Gateway Mall as well as Sacred Heart Medical Center at RiverBend and International Way. A second extension to West Eugene opened on September 17, 2017, adding 9 miles (14 km) to the system.

The Institute for Transportation and Development Policy (ITDP), under its BRT Standard, has given the EmX corridor a Bronze ranking.

== Description ==
The EmX system is made up of sections of dedicated bus lanes for most of the route (60%), with normal roads in between. The vehicles are given signal priority via ground-loop signaling to the traffic control system, with special traffic signals at intersections. The vehicles have two sets of doors on the left and three on the right, allowing loading from platforms on either side. Most of the right hand side platforms can only accommodate the rear two doors. Riding the Emerald Express was free when it began operations, but now costs regular fare. The articulated buses are equipped with Hybrid drives which allows for a smooth acceleration from stops and through the various road segments.

On weekdays, service runs approximately from 6:00 am to 11:00 pm. Buses arrive every 10 minutes throughout the day, with longer headways during the evening and the first hour of the morning. More limited service operates during the weekend.

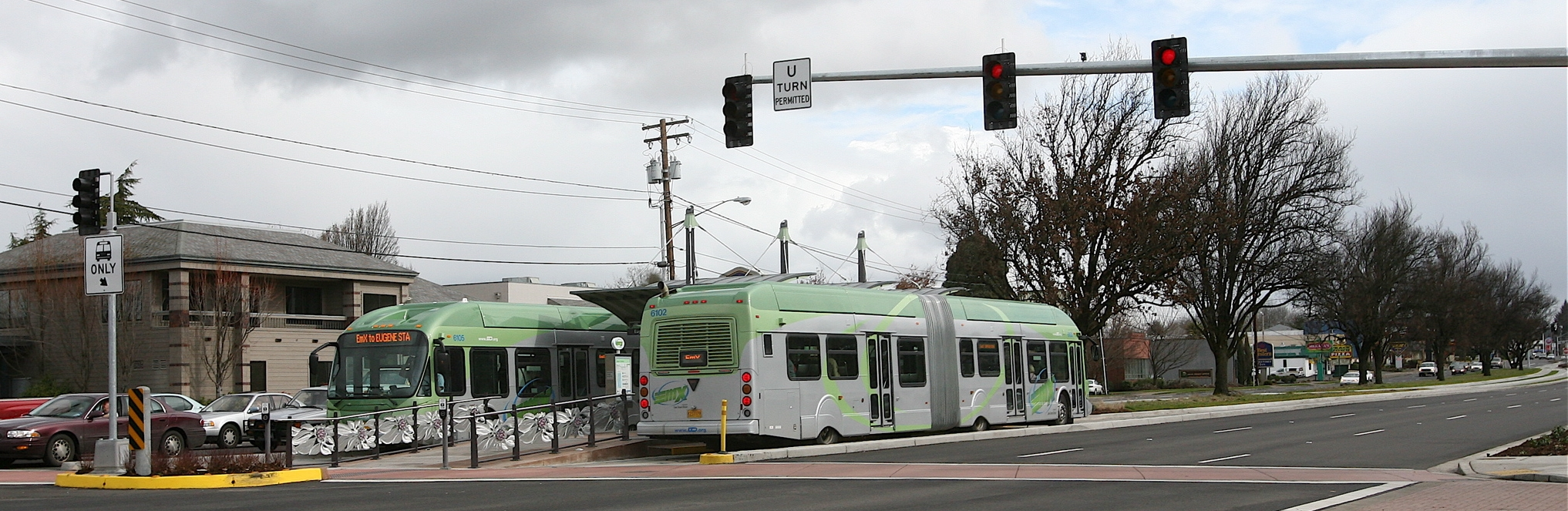
EmX buses at Agate Station, with dedicated busway visible at right

== Fares ==
EmX fares are the same as other LTD bus routes; both single-ride ($1.75) and passes ($3.50 daily, $50 monthly) are accepted.

Unlike other LTD bus routes, the EmX uses a proof-of-payment system, and fares must be paid prior to boarding at ticket vending machines located on station platforms.

== Lines ==
=== Green Line ===
The first EmX line, the Franklin Corridor (Green Line), opened on January 14, 2007. It runs between Eugene Station in downtown Eugene and Springfield Station in downtown Springfield, and serves the University of Oregon. It is 4 mi (6.4 km) long and cost $25 million to design and build.

Compared with the non-BRT service that the Green Line replaced (Route 11), rush hour travel times decreased over 25% from 22 minutes to 16 minutes and ridership doubled in the first year. In fiscal 2008–09, Green Line ridership was 1.6M.

Local artist Linn Cook was selected by a committee of artists and community members to create cast and formed metal railings depicting indigenous plants. Each station features a different plant.

=== Gateway Line ===
The 7.8 mi (12.6 km) Gateway Line extension opened on January 9, 2011, linking downtown Springfield and Sacred Heart Medical Center at RiverBend. It uses the newly constructed Pioneer Parkway corridor and newly-constructed dedicated bus lanes on Martin Luther King Jr. Parkway and RiverBend Drive.

=== West Eugene Extension ===
The West Eugene Extension added 17 stations west of Eugene Station. It opened on September 17, 2017.

LTD conducted environmental analyses and collected public comments as part of the extension's planning process. A number of route alignments were considered, focusing on West 6th, 7th, or 13th Avenues to connect with West 11th Avenue somewhere near Chambers or Garfield Streets. One alternative placed service on West 7th Place instead of West 11th Avenue between Garfield and Seneca Rd. All alternatives continued down West 11th Avenue to a planned terminus and turnaround in the Walmart parking lot west of Commerce Street. In spring 2011, the west 6th and 7th to 11th was selected as the locally preferred alternative.

Some local businesses and residents opposed the extension, saying that it would be expensive, unnecessary, and could cause a decrease in property values. In June 2013, opponents of the extension filed suit in federal court in Seattle, challenging the extension's approval and funding by the Federal Transit Administration. The suit alleged nine violations of the National Environmental Policy Act and alleged violations of the Administrative Procedure Act. The suit further claimed that LTD had not met requirements for federal funding. The court ruled against the extension's opponents in July 2014, and construction began in March 2015. The Federal Transit Administration awarded $75 million to the project in September 2015, covering most of its $96.5 million total cost.

=== Future ===
LTD eventually plans to run EmX along all main transportation corridors in the metro area. Their MovingAhead long-range plan includes expansion of EmX service on new corridors. As of 2019, the corridors under consideration for EmX or other expanded bus services are 30th Avenue to serve Lane Community College; Coburg Road; Highway 99; Martin Luther King Jr. Boulevard; and River Road.

== Stations ==
EmX Green Line
Station	Type	Location	Coordinates	Notes	Image
Commerce Station	Side	W 11th Ave at Commerce St	44°02′53.5″N 123°10′13.9″W	Western terminus	
Bertelsen	Side	W 11th Ave at Bertelsen Rd	44°02′52.9″N 123°09′44.8″W		
Sam Reynolds	Side	W 11th Ave east of Sam Reynolds St	44°02′53.0″N 123°09′22.5″W		
Bailey Hill	Side	W 11th Ave west of Bailey Hill Rd	44°02′52.9″N 123°08′55.2″W		
Seneca Station	Side	W 11th Ave west of Seneca Rd	44°02′52.6″N 123°08′28.3″W	Seneca Central Shopping Center	
Oak Patch	Side	W 11th Ave at Oak Patch Rd	44°02′52.5″N 123°08′08.5″W		
McKinley	Side	W 11th Ave at McKinley St	44°02′52.3″N 123°07′47.8″W		
Garfield/11th	Side	Garfield St north of W 11th Ave (inbound)	44°02′53.2″N 123°07′23.3″W		
Garfield/10th	Side	Garfield St south of 10th Ave (outbound)	44°02′54.0″N 123°07′22.4″W		
Garfield/7th	Side	Garfield St south of 7th Ave (outbound)	44°03′05.9″N 123°07′21.7″W		
Garfield/6th	Side	Garfield St south of 6th Ave (inbound)	44°03′11.6″N 123°07′20.7″W		
Chambers Street	Side	6th Ave west of Chambers St (inbound); 7th Ave west of Chambers St (outbound)			
Polk Street	Side	6th Ave west of Polk St (inbound); 7th Ave west of Polk St (outbound)			
Monroe Street	Side	6th Ave west of Monroe St (inbound); 7th Ave east of Monroe St (outbound)			
Charnelton Street	Side	Charnelton St south of 6th Ave (inbound); Charnelton St south of 7th Ave (outbound)	44°03′07.7″N 123°05′44.8″W		
Eugene	Side	10th Ave at Olive St	44°02′55.1″N 123°05′37.3″W	LTD Bus Station, Bays T and U	
High Street	Center	10th Ave at High St (outbound); 11th Ave at High Street (inbound)	44°02′55.7″N 123°05′16.5″W		
Hilyard	Center	11th Ave at Hilyard St	44°02′51.5″N 123°04′56.5″W	Sacred Heart Medical Center University District	
Dads' Gates	Center	11th Ave at Old Campus Lane	44°02′51.8″N 123°04′39.3″W	University of Oregon, West end of Campus	
Agate	Center	Franklin Blvd at Agate St	44°02′47.2″N 123°04′09.8″W	At east end of University of Oregon Campus	
Walnut	Center	Franklin Blvd at Walnut St	44°02′41.2″N 123°03′40.5″W		
Glenwood	Side	Franklin Blvd at Glenwood Blvd		Separate EB and WB curbside platforms on opposite sides of the street	
Lexington	Side	Franklin Blvd at Lexington Ave		Separate EB and WB curbside platforms on opposite sides of the street	
McVay	Center	Franklin Blvd at Main St	44°02′39.1″N 123°01′51.4″W		
Springfield	Side	S A St. at Pioneer Pkwy E	44°02′44.0″N 123°01′18.8″W	LTD Bus Station, Bays F and G	
E Street	Side	Pioneer Pkwy W at E St		Southbound	
F Street	Side	Pioneer Pkwy E at F St		Northbound	
Centennial	Center	Pioneer Pkwy at Centennial Blvd			
Q Street	Center	Pioneer Pkwy at Q St			
Hayden Bridge	Center	Pioneer Pkwy at Hayden Bridge Way			
RiverBend	Center	Martin Luther King Jr Pkwy at RiverBend Dr			
Sacred Heart	Center	RiverBend Dr at Cardinal Way		Sacred Heart Medical Center at RiverBend South Entrance	
Pavilion Station	Center	Sacred Heart Medical Center at RiverBend North Entrance			
International Way East	Center	International Way			
Maple Island	Center	International Way at Maple Island Farm Rd; AKA International Center			
International Way West	Center	International Way		Symantec Corporation	
Kruse Way	Side	Gateway St at Kruse Way		Separate NB and SB curbside platforms on opposite sides of the street	
Postal Way	Side	Gateway St at Postal Way		Separate NB and SB curbside platforms on opposite sides of the street	
Gateway	Side	West side of Gateway St., south of Oakdale Ave.	44°04′25.0″N 123°02′33.8″W	LTD Bus Station at Gateway Mall	
Guy Lee	Side	Harlow Rd at Guy Lee Park		Separate NB and SB curbside platforms on opposite sides of the street	
Pheasant	Side	Harlow Rd at Pheasant Blvd		Separate NB and SB curbside platforms on opposite sides of the street	
