= Mims House =

Historic house in Eugene, Oregon

- U.S. Historic district – Contributing property
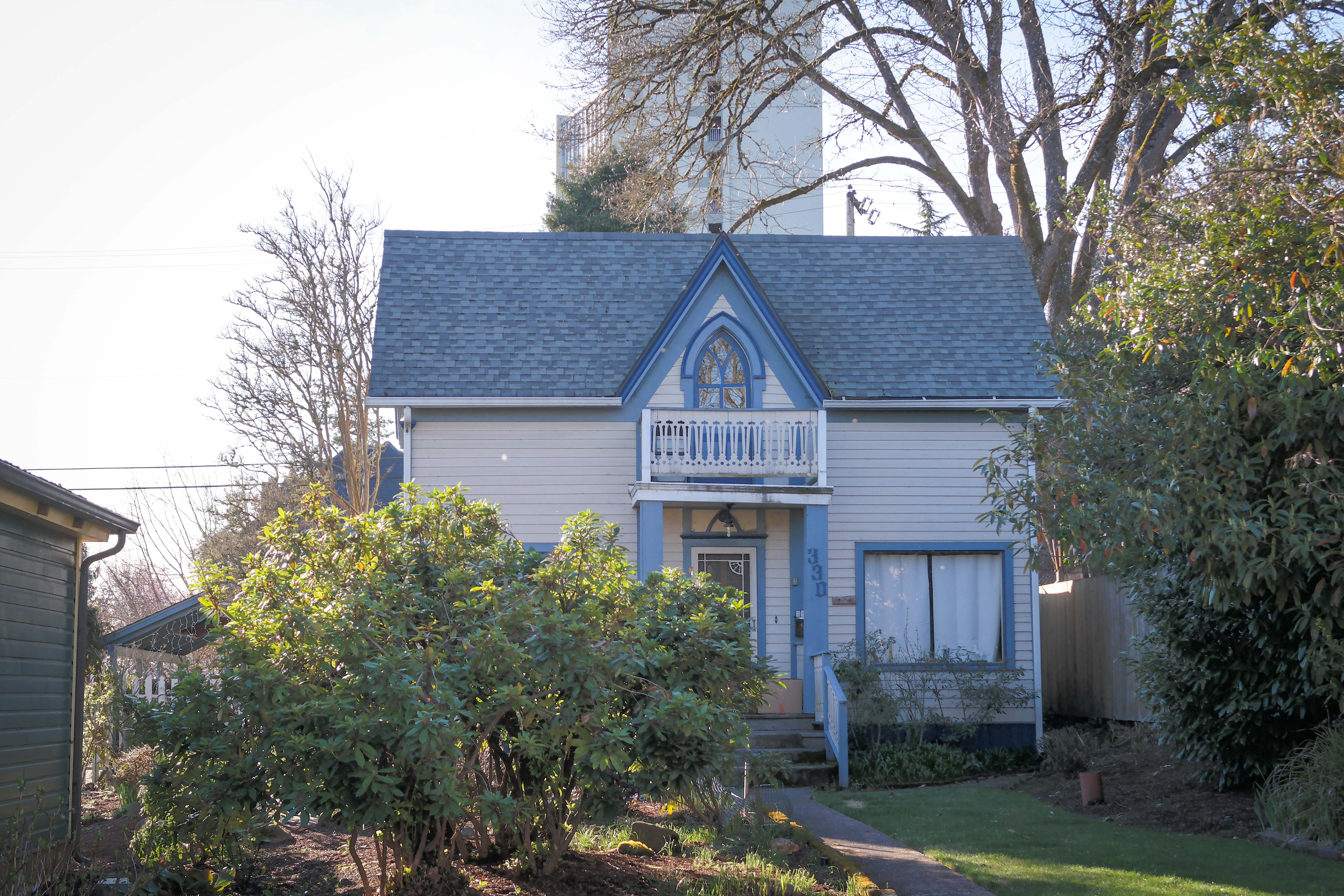
- The house in 2014

- Location within Oregon
- Location: 330 High St, Eugene, Oregon
- Coordinates: 44.0652°N 123.0885°W
- Built: 1867
- Architectural style: Gothic Revival
- Part of: East Skinner Butte Historic District (ID82003732)
- Designated CP: September 23, 1922

The Mims House in Eugene, Oregon, USA, is a Gothic Revival-style, single-family home considered to be one of the oldest homes in the area. It is known for being the home of the Mims family, who were one of the first African American homeowners in Eugene when they purchased it in 1948. During the period of racial segregation in Eugene, the Mims family frequently hosted African American visitors to Eugene both at their home and in the adjoining boarding house which they owned. The building is a Historic Landmark located within the East Skinner Butte Historic District. In 2021, the Eugene-Springfield branch of the NAACP was located in the Mims House, although the home also operates as a museum.

== History ==
The Mims House was built in 1867 on Skinner Butte and is considered to be one of the oldest homes in Eugene. In 1979, it was designated a Historic Landmark by the city of Eugene before being added to the National Register of Historic Places as part of the East Skinner Butte Historic District several years later. The house is distinctive given its steep gable roof with cross-gable and pointed arch windows, an architectural style "representative of Gothic Revival Style". It is one of the oldest homes in the East Skinner Butte area and is thought to be the home of James Huddleston, one of Eugene's early settlers.

An interesting architectural aspect of the home is the millstone, located in the yard. The millstone was from the Eugene Mill & Elevator Company and is believed to have been brought to the property to be used as a doorstep when the original mill burned down in 1894. The original mill was built by Hilyard Shaw in 1855-1856 and was one of several to make use of the millrace to power their mills.

== The Mims family ==
Originally from Marshall, Texas, Annie Mims was born in 1902 and married C.B. Mims at the age of 15. In the early 1940s, the Mims family settled in Vancouver, Washington, where C.B. Mims worked in the shipyards.

After the war, the family moved to McCredie Springs, a small community east of Oakridge, where C.B. Mims worked on the Southern Pacific Railroad. The Mims family arrived in Eugene in 1947. A skilled millwright, C.B. Mims hoped to take advantage of the post-World War II timber boom by finding a job at one of the many lumber mills, but work in mills was scarce due to racial discrimination, so he became a busboy at the Osburn Hotel. Joe E. Earley Sr., the owner of the Osburn Hotel, guaranteed C.B. Mims lifetime employment.

Due to racial segregation, the Mims were forced to live north of the Willamette River in what was then called the Ferry Street Village. The Mims family occupied a dirt-floor shack in this segregated community for two years. While C.B. Mims worked at the Osburn Hotel, Annie Mims picked beans and other crops to help support the family. The Mims family was the first African American family to move across the river into Eugene after Joe E. Earley Sr. sponsored the purchase of the two houses where they stayed. They lived in the house at the back of the lot, while the house in front was used by African Americans who were denied lodging in the rest of the city. Shortly after they moved in, a petition was started by a neighbor to demand that they leave, but this petition received little support.

During the Civil Rights era Annie Mims and her son Willie protested discriminatory housing practices in Eugene. In the 1960s, loans and employment for African Americans were still hard to come by, and the first loan the Mims received after the one provided by Earley Sr. came from the federal government to restore the Mims House.

== Racial segregation in Eugene ==
In the United States, Jim Crow laws affected the ability of Black people to travel safely. White supremacists aimed to prevent travel through violence and intimidation. Black travelers were subject to racial profiling that could escalate to violence. Oregon broadly has a history of racism. Its 1857 constitution included an exclusion clause that prevented Black people and people of color from settling in the state.

The Negro Motorist Green Book was published to show places where Black motorists could stay safely. The Mims House functioned unofficially as such a safe place. Eugene was a notorious "sundown town", a place that engaged in racial segregation either through legal discrimination or through intimidation and violence. As with other U.S. cities, Eugene also had historically racist housing practices such as Redlining and racially restrictive covenants.

Eugene residents engaged in racialized discrimination and violence in attempts to prevent Black people from settling in the region. Eugene was also known as a town that had strong ties to the Ku Klux Klan. On top of Skinner Butte, near the Mims House, the Klan burned crosses to intimidate Black residents and visitors. This racial violence was experienced by students at the local University of Oregon. Black athletes in the university's programs were housed in the Mims house at times because the dormitories were segregated.

The Mims purchased the house they used as a safe haven in 1948. The Mims House provided lodging for Black visitors to Eugene until 1966, and Black celebrities such as Nat King Cole, Ella Fitzgerald, Louis Armstrong, and Paul Robeson stayed there.

== Community uses of the Mims House ==
The Mims family, along with several other African American families including that of Lyllye Reynolds-Parker, helped found the St. Mark's Christian Methodist Episcopal Church in Eugene. Their family home was used as a meeting place and event center for the church with meetings, socials, and benefit dinners being held there. Currently, the Mims property is leased by the Eugene-Springfield branch of the National Association for the Advancement of Colored People, which is headquartered there and holds events for the community and advocacy at the Mims House. During COVID-19, the Mims House also served as a food pantry and vaccination clinic for the local community.
