= Eugene station =

Eugene station may refer to:

- Eugene station (Amtrak), a train station in Eugene, Oregon, United States
- Eugene Station (Lane Transit District), a bus terminal in Eugene
