= Willie Richardson (anti-racism advocate) =

American civil rights activist (1948–2023)

Willie Bell Richardson (December 20, 1948 – January 25, 2023) was an American civil rights activist and community advocate who was president of Oregon Black Pioneers. She was a long-time resident of Salem, Oregon.

== Early life ==
Richardson was born on December 20, 1948. She grew up in South Carolina and moved to Salem with her family in 1978.

== Career ==
Richardson was elected to the Salem-Keizer School Board in 1987, the first Black person to serve on the Board. Among her legacies in the district is her active recruitment of Black faculty and staff.

Richardson also served on the Salem Human Rights Commission and worked several jobs for the State between 1978 and 1991. She opened an independent retail store for women's fashion, but, as of 2010, her focus was solely on community and non-profit work.

Working with Jackie Winters, she revived a nonprofit organization originally called Northwest Black Pioneers. During her tenure with the organization, their name changed to Oregon Black Pioneers, and they expanded the scope of their activities to include a wide variety of outreach and advocacy work.

== Personal life and death ==
Richardson died on January 25, 2023, at the age of 74.

== See also ==
- History of African Americans in Oregon
- Oregon Black Pioneers
