= William Tebeau =

American engineer and educator

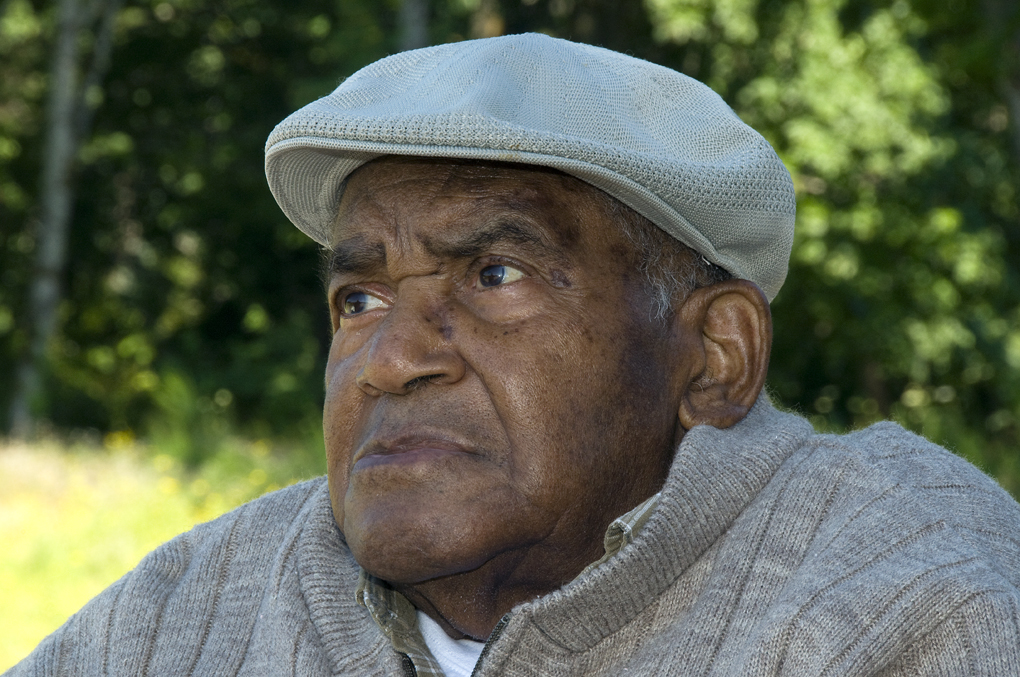
- Born: William Henry Tebeau; November 23, 1925; Baker City, Oregon, United States
- Died: July 5, 2013 (age 87)
- Engineering career
- Discipline: Chemical Engineering; Civil Engineering
- Institutions: Oregon State University
- Employer: Oregon Department of Transportation
- Projects: Planning and research of Oregon's highway construction and improvement programs
- Awards: 1970 Teacher of the Year, Chemeketa Community College; 1971 Employee of the Year of Oregon State Employees Association; 2008 Oregon Northwest Black Pioneers Trailblazer Award; 2010 College of Engineering Oregon Stater Award

William Henry Tebeau (November 23, 1925 – July 5, 2013) in 1948 became the first African-American man to graduate from Oregon State College (OSU). He was an engineer for the Oregon Department of Transportation (ODOT) for 36 years. A residence hall at OSU and Highway 126 between Eugene and Florence are both named after him.

== Early life ==
William Tebeau was born in Baker, Oregon, United States, to Henry William Tebeau and Frances (née Binor) Tebeau. At age 12, he joined the Boy Scouts of America, earning the Order of the Arrow and eventually becoming an Eagle Scout. In 1943, he graduated from Baker High School.

== Education ==
Tebeau was admitted to Oregon State, but he was not offered a housing assignment because of his race, nearly a decade prior to Oregon's fair housing laws. (Note: For more information, see Housing discrimination in the United States, Racism in Oregon, and African Americans in Oregon.) He found a job at a fraternity house tending the furnace, in exchange for a room in the basement. He graduated with a degree in chemical engineering in 1948. When he was unable to find work as a chemical engineer, he studied on his own to become a civil engineer.

== Engineering career ==
Tebeau earned his civil engineering license and joined the Oregon State Highway Department, where he worked for 36 years. He also taught at Chemeketa Community College, where he was named 1970 Teacher of the Year.

== Honors ==
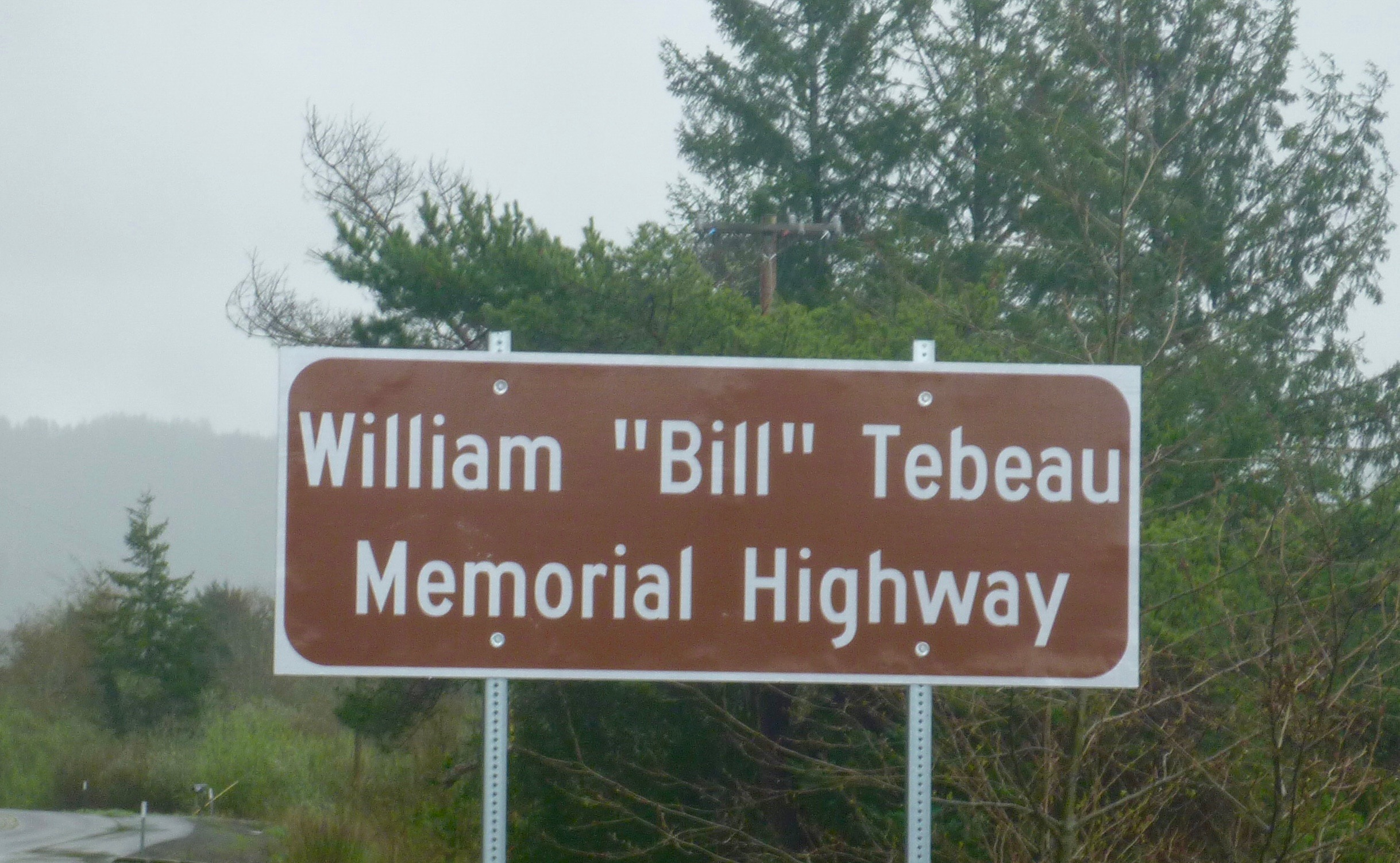
Memorial Highway sign honoring state highway engineer William "Bill" Tebeau

In May 2014, Oregon State University announced that its new residence hall east of the Kerr Administration Building on Washington Way would be named after Tebeau, the first African-American male to earn a degree from the university.

In January 2016, the Oregon Legislature passed SB 5, designating State Highway 126 between Florence and Eugene as "William Tebeau Memorial Highway".

== See also ==
- List of African-American pioneers in desegregation of higher education
- Timeline of African-American firsts
