= Columbus Sewell =

Christopher Columbus Sewell (1820 - 1899), primarily known as Columbus Sewell, was one of the first Black Oregonians in Grant County, Oregon, alongside his wife and sons.

== Early life ==
Columbus was born in 1820 in Virginia. As a young man, he volunteered as part of the Black Hawk War and served under Winfield Scott. He then remained in Wisconsin. In 1849, he moved to California in search of gold as part of the Gold Rush.

== Life in Oregon ==
In 1862, Columbus moved to Canyon City, Oregon after others found gold in Canyon Creek. Eventually, he purchased a wagon and transitioned to a career as a "teamster," or freight hauler, between Canyon City and The Dalles.He started his career hauling mining supplies before transitioning to furniture and food.

In 1867, he built his own homestead. He married nineteen-year-old Louisa Sewell in Richmond, Virginia and she moved out to Oregon with him. They had three children, with two sons, Thomas and Joseph, surviving to adulthood.
