= Mims (name) =

Mims is a given name and surname. People with the name include:

== Given name ==
- Mims (rapper) (born 1981), American rapper
- Mims Davies (born 1975), British member of Parliament
- Mims Hackett (born 1941), member of the New Jersey General Assembly and mayor of Orange, New Jersey

== Surname ==
- A. Grace Lee Mims (1930–2019), American singer and radio personality
- Amiah Mims, American artist
- Amarius Mims (born 2002), American football player
- Antwan Mims (born 1978), American criminal
- Billy Mims, American basketball coach
- Bonnaye Mims (born 1952), member of the Missouri House of Representatives
- Chris Mims (1970–2008), American football player
- Christopher Mims, American journalist
- Crawford Mims (1933–2001), American football player
- D. Jeffrey Mims (born 1954), American artist
- David Mims (offensive tackle) (born 1988), American football player
- David Mims (wide receiver) (born 1970), American football player
- Dennis Mims (born 1980), American basketball player
- Denzel Mims (born 1997), American football wide receiver
- Donna Mae Mims (1927–2009), American racecar driver
- Edwin Mims (1872–1959), American professor of English literature
- Elvin Mims (born 1979), American basketball player
- Ernie Mims (1932–2019), American television show host
- Forrest Mims (born 1944), American amateur scientist and author
- Holley Mims (1929–1970), American boxer
- Jay Mims (born 1977), American soccer coach
- Jeff Mims (born 1947), mayor of Dayton, Ohio
- Jesse Mims (born 1948), American football player
- John Mims (1815–1856), mayor of Atlanta, Georgia
- Jordan Mims (born 1999), American football player
- Lambert C. Mims (1930–2008), politician in Mobile, Alabama
- Livingston Mims (1833–1906), mayor of Atlanta, Georgia
- Marilyn Mims (born 1954), American soprano singer
- Marvin Mims (born 2002), American football player
- Mary Mims (1882–1967), American educator
- Matthew Mims (born 1992), American pro wrestler
- Ralph Mims (born 1985), American basketball player
- Sam Mims V (born 1972), member of the Mississippi House of Representatives
- Sam Mims Jr. (1880–1946), Mississippi state senator
- Sergio Mims (1955–2022), American film critic
- Sue Harper Mims (1842–1913), American social leader in Atlanta, Georgia
- William Mims (1927–1991), American actor
- William C. Mims (born 1957), Virginia judge, state senator and attorney general
