= Mimms =

Mimms may refer to:

== People ==
- Bobby Mimms
- Garnet Mimms
- Zerelda Mimms

== Places ==
- South Mimms
- North Mymms

== See also ==
- Mims (disambiguation)
