= Lane Transit District =

Public agency in Oregon

Coordinates: 44.04235°N 123.04147°W

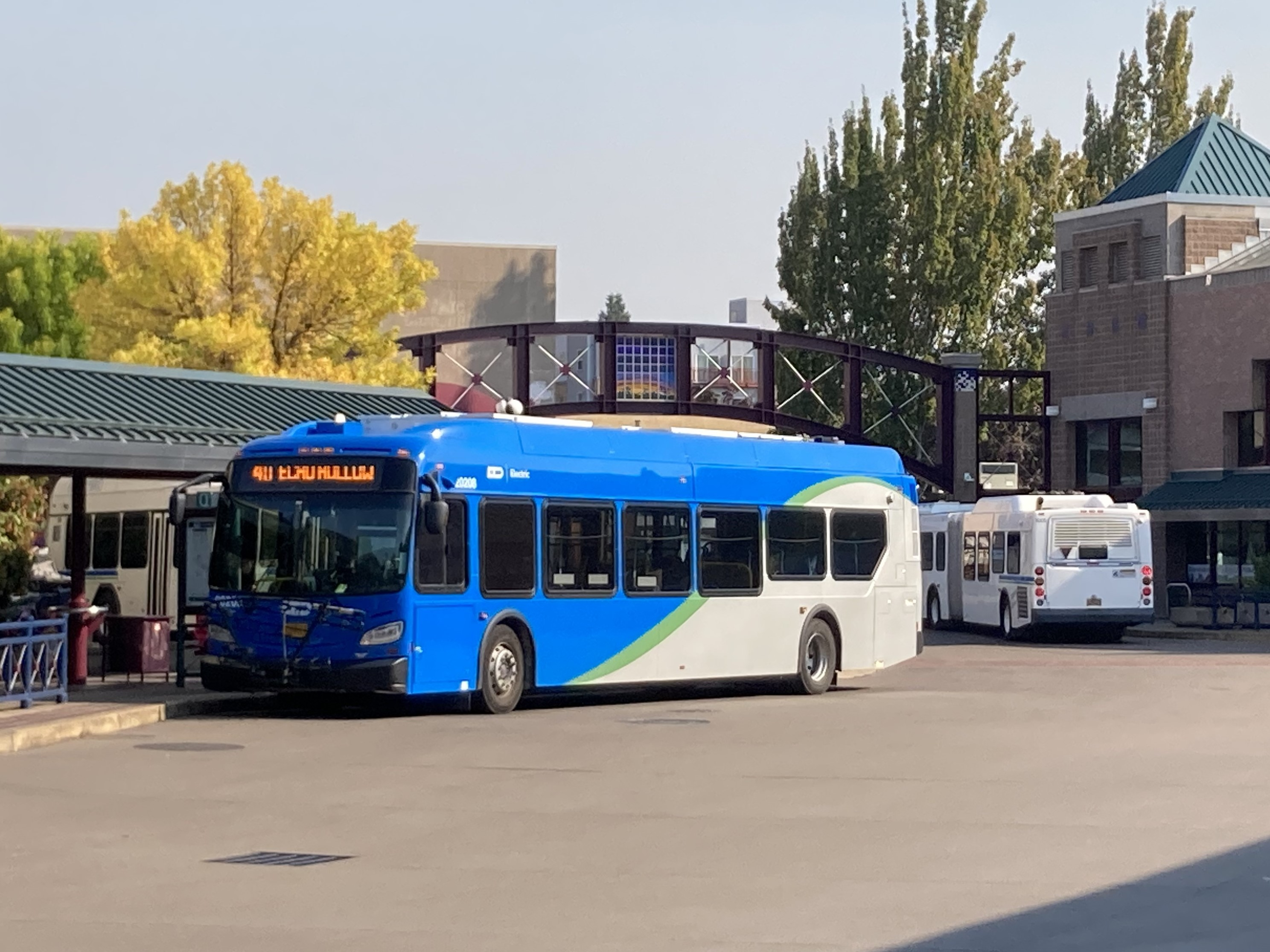
- LTD buses at Eugene Station
- Founded: 1970
- Headquarters: 3500 East 17th Avenue; Eugene, Oregon
- Service area: Lane County, Oregon
- Service type: bus service, bus rapid transit, guided bus, paratransit
- Routes: 30 regular bus routes 1 bus rapid transit line
- Stations: 10
- Fleet: 117 (FY 2011–2012)
- Daily ridership: 22,000 (weekdays, Q2 2026)
- Annual ridership: 5,911,200 (2025)
- Fuel type: Diesel, Diesel/Hybrid, Electric
- Chief executive: Jameson Auten (General Manager)
- Website: ltd.org

The Lane Transit District (LTD) is a public agency that provides public transportation in Lane County, Oregon, United States. The transit district serves the Eugene and Springfield metropolitan areas, including the neighboring cities of Coburg, Junction City, Creswell, Cottage Grove, Veneta, and Lowell. LTD began service in 1970 with eighteen buses and two vans, and today carries roughly 10.5 million customers annually with a fleet of 111 buses. Many of LTD's riders are students; University of Oregon and Lane Community College students ride by simply showing their student I.D. Student fees subsidize both programs. In 2025, the system had a ridership of 5,911,200, or about 22,000 per weekday as of the second quarter of 2026.

A board of directors, whose members are appointed by the Governor of Oregon, governs LTD. A combination of passenger fares, payroll taxes, and state and federal money fund the system.

According to LTD's website, LTD operates 111 buses, which includes both standard and low-floor buses, in length of 30-foot, 40-foot, and 60-foot (articulated buses) for regular services. Eleven of the fleet are the 60-foot BRT vehicles used for EmX service. All LTD buses have been wheelchair-accessible since 1985. The district currently operates forty-five hybrid-electric buses, and eleven electric buses.

== Climate Policy and Fleet Electrification ==
In March 2020, LTD passed its first-ever board-level climate policy, with a commitment to reduce emissions from the fleet by 75% by 2030 and by 100% by 2035. Additionally, the policy calls for working with local jurisdictions to create joint goals related to the intersection of transportation and land use.

The agency took delivery of the first of eleven electric buses from New Flyer in December 2020, with the remainder scheduled to arrive in the first half of 2021.

== EmX (Bus Rapid Transit in Eugene) ==
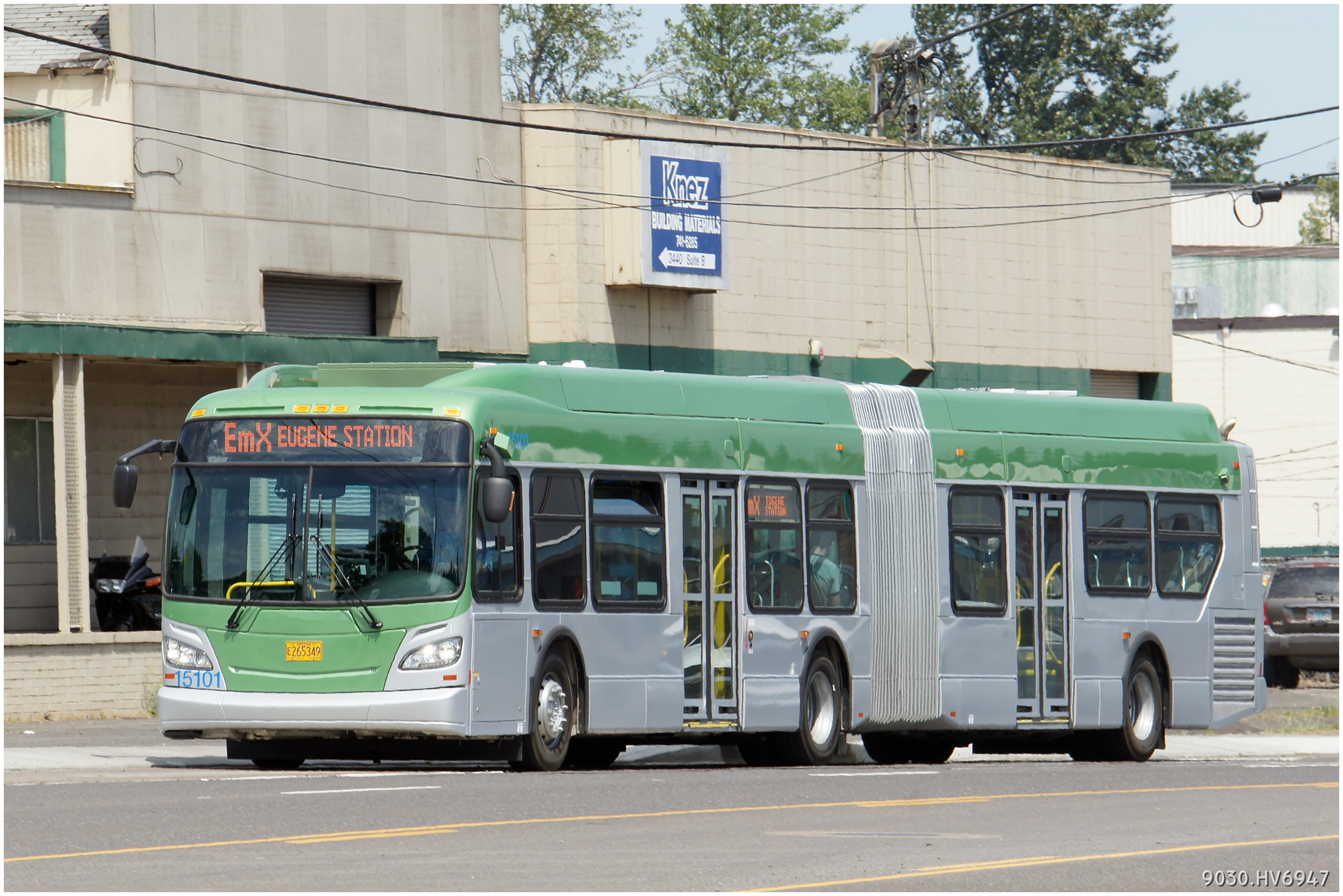
2015 New Flyer XDE60 EmX bus

In addition to the fixed bus routes, LTD operates a bus rapid transit line from downtown Eugene to the Gateway area in north Springfield, via downtown Springfield. The BRT line, named the Emerald Express (EmX), began operations in January 2007. This is Oregon's first Bus Rapid Transit line. The first corridor connects downtown Eugene to downtown Springfield and runs primarily along Franklin Boulevard. A second EmX corridor, the Gateway EmX extension, began service in January 2011. The Gateway EmX extension connects downtown Springfield and the Gateway area in north Springfield. LTD chose bus rapid transit after a review process during which several transportation options, including light rail, were considered. It concluded that this was the best option for Eugene-Springfield's size and current transportation needs.

The West Eugene Extension is a 17-station extension of the existing EmX service west from its existing terminus at Eugene Station in downtown Eugene. The extension opened on September 17, 2017. The addition added 4.4 miles to EmX's current line, while also adding a new bike lane, two new bike and pedestrian bridges, and 4.7 miles of new, wider sidewalks installed along West 6th, 7th, and 11th Avenues.

Future EmX line extensions to the Thurston neighborhood, Lane Community College, and LTD's River Road station are currently under consideration.

== Route list ==
(Information as of September 6th, 2026)

Number	Name	From	To	Intermediate stops/Via	Notes
EmX	Emerald Express	Commerce Station	Gateway Station	Eugene Station, Dads' Gate Station (University of Oregon), Agate Station (Matthew Knight Arena, Hayward Field) Springfield Station, Sacred Heart Hospital at RiverBend, Gateway Station (The Shoppes at Gateway)	10-minute headways most of the day weekdays, 15- to 30-minute headways during evenings and weekends.
1	Downtown Loop	Eugene Station	Oak at 18th (Safeway)	3rd at High	30-minute headways most of the day every day. Rerouted from 1 - Campbell Center in 2025.
11	Thurston	Springfield Station	Main at 69th	Thurston Road	15-minute headways most of the day, 30-minute headways during evenings every day.
12	Gateway	Eugene Station	VA Clinic	Gateway Station	30-minute headways most of the day weekdays and Saturdays, 60-minute headways during evenings and Sundays. Routes 12, 66, and 67 run together to provide 15-minute frequencies between Eugene Station and Oakway Center.
13	Centennial	Eugene Station	Olympic & 21st (WinCo)	MLK JR Blvd., Autzen Stadium, Chase Village	30-minute headways most of the day weekdays and Saturdays, 60-minute headways during evenings and Sundays.
17	5th Street/Hayden Bridge	Springfield Station	Marcola at 19th (Mohawk Marketplace)	Hayden Bridge Road, McKenzie-Willamette Medical Center	30- to 60- minute headways on weekdays, 60-minute headways on weekends.
18	Mohawk	Springfield Station	Marcola at 19th (Mohawk Marketplace)	McKenzie-Willamette Medical Center, Marcola Road	30- to 60- minute headways on weekdays, 60-minute headways on weekends.
24	Donald	Eugene Station	Donald at Fox Hollow	Willamette St, Donald St, South Eugene High School	30-minute headways most of the day weekdays and Saturdays, 60-minute headways during evenings and Sundays.
28	Hilyard	Eugene Station	West Amazon & Martin	University of Oregon, South Eugene High School	30-minute headways most of the day weekdays and Saturdays, 60-minute headways during evenings and Sundays. Routes 28 and 81 run together to provide 15-minute frequencies between Eugene Station, U of O Station, and Hilyard/30th.
33	Jefferson	Eugene Station	Amazon Station	Jefferson St, 28th Ave/29th Ave	Weekdays only, 8 round-trips.
36	West 18th Ave	Eugene Station	11th at Commerce (Walmart)	West 18th, Willow Creek Rd, West 11th	30-minute headways most of the day weekdays and Saturdays, 60-minute headways during evenings and Sundays.
40	Echo Hollow	Eugene Station	Wagner & Cubit (WinCo)	Eugene Amtrak station, Blair Blvd, Willamette High School	30-minute headways most of the day weekdays and Saturdays, 60-minute headways during evenings and Sundays. Routes 40 and 52 run together to provide 15-minute frequencies between Eugene Station and Chambers/2nd.
41	Barger/Commerce	Eugene Station	11th at Commerce (Target)	Highway 99, Barger Dr, Bertelsen Rd	30-minute headways most of the day every day, 60-minute headways during evenings. 15-minute headways on weekdays at peak morning hours.
51	Santa Clara	Eugene Station	Spring Creek at River Road	Santa Clara Station, River Road, Aubrey Park	30-minute headways most of the day weekdays, 60-minute headways during evenings and weekends. Routes 51 and 52 run together to provide 15-minute (weekdays) / 30-minute (weekends) frequencies between Eugene and Santa Clara Stations.
52	Irving	Eugene Station	Irvington at Willowbrook	River Road, Santa Clara Station, Irving	30-minute headways most of the day weekdays, 60-minute headways on weekends. Routes 51 and 52 run together to provide 15-minute (weekdays) / 30-minute (weekends) frequencies between Eugene and Santa Clara Stations. Routes 40 and 52 run together to provide 15-minute frequencies between Eugene Station and Chambers/2nd.
55	North Park	Eugene Station	Santa Clara Station	Emerald Park, North Eugene High School, West 11th Ave	Weekdays only, two AM and three PM round-trips.
66	VRC/Coburg Rd	Eugene Station	Delta Oaks Shopping Center	Valley River Center, Delta Oaks Shopping Center, Sheldon High School, Oakway Center	30-minute headways most of the day weekdays and Saturdays, 60-minute headways during evenings and Sundays. 20-minute headways during afternoon peak hours. Routes 12, 66, and 67 run together to provide 15-minute frequencies between Eugene Station and Oakway Center.
67	Coburg Rd/VRC	Eugene Station	Delta Oaks Shopping Center	Oakway Center, Sheldon High School, Delta Oaks Shopping Center, Valley River Center	30-minute headways most of the day weekdays and Saturdays, 60-minute headways during evenings and Sundays. 20-minute headways during afternoon peak hours. Routes 12, 66, and 67 run together to provide 15-minute frequencies between Eugene Station and Oakway Center.
79X	UO/Kinsrow	University of Oregon Station	Garden Way at Kinsrow	MLK Jr Blvd, Autzen Stadium	30- to 60- minute headways on weekdays, no service on weekends or during UO school breaks.
81	LCC/Hilyard	Eugene Station	Lane Community College (LCC)	U of O Station, South Eugene High School, Hilyard St	30-minute headways on weekdays, 60-minute headways on Saturdays except during U of O school breaks, no service Sundays. Routes 28 and 81 run together to provide 15-minute frequencies between Eugene Station, U of O Station, and Hilyard/30th. Routes 81 and 82 run together to provide 15-minute frequencies between Eugene Station and LCC Station.
82	LCC/Pearl	Eugene Station	Lane Community College (LCC)	Pearl St, Amazon Station	30-minute headways most of the day weekdays, except during LCC school breaks. No service weekends. Routes 81 and 82 run together to provide 15-minute frequencies between Eugene Station and LCC Station.
85	LCC/Springfield	Springfield Station	Lane Community College (LCC)		60-minute headways on weekdays only.
91	McKenzie Bridge	Eugene Station	McKenzie Bridge Ranger Station	Thurston, Waterville, Leaburg, Vida, Nimrod, Finn Rock, Blue River, McKenzie Bridge	4 round trips on weekdays, 2 round trips on weekends.
92	Lowell/LCC	Eugene Station	Lowell	Amazon Station, LCC Station, Pleasant Hill, Dexter	3 trips Lowell to Eugene Station on weekdays and Saturdays, with 2 Eugene-Lowell.
93	Veneta	Eugene Station	Veneta Park and Ride	West 11th Ave, Highway 126	5 round trips on weekdays, 3 on Saturdays, 2 on Sundays.
95	Junction City	Eugene Station	Lindeborg Junction City	Highway 99N	4 round trips on weekdays, 3 on Saturdays, 2 on Sundays.
96	Coburg	Eugene Station	Coburg Industrial Park	Oakway Center, Gilham Rd, Country Farm Rd	3 round trips on weekdays, 2 on Saturdays.
98	Cottage Grove	Eugene Station	Cottage Grove Walmart	U of O Station, LCC Station, Creswell	6 round trips on weekdays, 3 on Saturdays, 2 on Sundays.
