= Oregon Black Pioneers =

Historical society in Salem, Oregon

Oregon Black Pioneers is a non-profit historical society focused on Black Oregonians, based in Salem, Oregon, United States.

== History ==
The organization was founded as "Northwest Black Pioneers" by Carole Davis, an educator from Seattle, and Oregon State Senator Jackie Winters in 1993. The group drew inspiration from the Northwest Black Pioneers in Seattle. The group later operated under the name "Oregon Northwest Black Pioneers" before officially settling on the name "Oregon Black Pioneers" in 2004.

The organization's early projects mainly focused on Black history education and presentations to Salem-area schools. After a few years of work, the volunteer group became mostly inactive. In 2004, Willie Richardson, a Salem business owner, school board member, and community advocate, gained support from other members to revitalize the group. Richardson served as the group's board president since then. In 2020, Executive Director Zachary Stocks became the organization's first paid staff member.

In February 2025, Oregon Black Pioneers put on a full schedule of events in towns in Oregon for Black History Month including film screenings, discussions, interactive exhibits and a panel of as yet untold stories.

== Programs and projects ==
=== Walking tours ===
Oregon Black Pioneers leads walking tours of Black history in towns across the state, which in 2025 included Portland, Jacksonville, Oregon City, Astoria, Eugene, and Salem.

=== Historical markers project ===
In 2007, Oregon Black Pioneers dedicated a granite marker to 43 Black people buried at the Salem Pioneer Cemetery.

== Exhibitions ==
- Perseverance
- A Community on the Move
- All Aboard! Railroading and Portland's Black Community
- Racing to Change: Oregon's Civil Rights Years
- Racing to Change: The Eugene Story

== Publications ==
- Perseverance: a history of African Americans in Oregon's Marion and Polk Counties. Salem, Oregon: Oregon Northwest Black Pioneers. 2011. ISBN 978-1-4507-4878-0. OCLC 747038125.
- Oregon Black Pioneers; Moreland, Kimberly Stowers (2013). African Americans of Portland. Charleston, South Carolina: Arcadia Publishing. ISBN 0-7385-9619-1. OCLC 809028266.

== Awards ==
- 2009: David Duniway Award for Historic Preservation, from the Marion County Historical Society
- 2010: Education Award from the Oregon Assembly for Black Affairs
- 2010: Heritage Award from American Legacy Magazine
- 2017: George McMath Historic Preservation Award

== See also ==
- History of African Americans in Oregon
- Willie Richardson
