= Louisa Sewell =

African-American woman

Louisa Sewell (1848-1893) was born in Richmond, Virginia. She was one of the first Black Oregonians in Grant County, alongside her husband, Columbus Sewell, and her sons, Thomas and Joseph.

== Life ==
Louisa was born in Richmond, Virginia in 1848. She moved to Canyon City, Oregon after marrying her husband, Columbus Sewell, at nineteen. She and Columbus had three sons. Thomas and Joseph survived into adulthood.

When she first got to Canyon City, she worked as a cook before transitioning to taking care of the homestead while Columbus traveled for his “teamster”/freight hauling business. Within her community, she was well-known for her homemade ice cream and the croquet court used when visitors came to the Sewell homestead. One notable guest included the Paiute writer Sarah Winnemucca. Louisa helped Sarah leave town when a white woman wanted to kill Sarah after a Paiute warrior killed her husband.

== In popular culture ==
Louisa was featured in “Meeting the Sewells,” an educational video created by the High Desert Museum and Oregon Black Pioneers.

Louisa was one of ten Black Oregonians portrayed in the art exhibit “Re-Envisioned: Contemporary Portraits of our Black Ancestors” by Jeremy Okai Davis.
