= Mary Mims =

American educator and sociologist

- Born: August 30, 1882; Minden, Louisiana, U.S.
- Died: November 24, 1967 (aged 85)
- Occupations: Educator, sociologist, agriculture sociologist extension agent

Mary Mims was born in Minden, Louisiana. She was a community organizer, teacher, educator, humanitarian, lecturer, and a sociologist. She was the founder of the "community organization movement" in cooperative extension. She was an extension services specialist in community organizing and worked for Louisiana State University. She was a state community worker for Louisiana.

== Early life ==
It is stated that Mary started teaching at the age of seven after she learned to read. She gathered it is said seven Negro children together, and starting teaching them how to read. Her father ordered seven readers for the seven children. She attended Mims Community School, and afterwards went to Louisiana Industrial Institute (La Tech) at Ruston, Louisiana in 1897 receiving a Bachelor of Industry Degree. She went on to attend Sophie B. Wright's School for Girls in New Orleans.

== Career ==
Mary Mims' teaching career started in Bienville Parish. She went on to become Louisiana's first female principal. She later became the first parish superintendent of education.

Mims is known as an advocate for community development. She is the co-author of the book "The Awakening Community", along with Georgia Williams Mortiz. She viewed communities as "seedbeds of democracy", and communities as a vital part of a government. Mims was a well known national orator during her time. She spoke alongside of president Calvin Coolidge as a guest speaker. She spoke at conferences nationally and internationally; and alongside of national leaders in the United States and with nobility in Europe and other parts of the world. Mims started her career as teacher in Bienville Parish, Louisiana. She was the state's first female principal. She later became parish superintendent of education. In 1925 she was recruited to work for the Louisiana State University Agricultural Extension. The work that she did the LSU extension became a model for the United States in the 1920s, 1930s, and 1940s. She was Louisiana's first extension sociologist. As an extension agent her tasks were to promote, economic, intellectual, civic, health, and recreational life programs to communities. She was a part of the early decades of educational organizing. Mims assisted agents in organizing communities in the state of Louisiana. As a specialist she help in the organizing of public work initiatives in the 1920s and 1930s.

Mims developed the "community organizing method" in the cooperative extension service in the 1920s. Her work extended across the South to over 1000 poor black and white communities through the 1930s.

Mary Mims worked with Essae Martha Culver to establish and promote library services in the Louisiana parishes.

She traveled to Denmark to study community building work and their folk schools. Folk high school are also known as adult or Popular education. In the 19th century N. F. S. Grundtvig pioneered the folk schools. What Mims learned in Denmark, she brought back to the United States. The folk schools were schools for lifelong learning. They gave the peasantry and those from the lower echelons of society opportunities for higher levels of learning. She initiated Folk School Weeks in Rayville, Louisiana and Abbeville, Louisiana. Mims is the founder of the Parish Folk School in Louisiana as training for community education.

In 1932, Mims along with Georgia Williams Moritz published the book "The Awakening Community." The book advocates for the development of strong communities. It became a model for community building and development. In the book community building and cooperative participation are seen as the chief duty of citizenship in a democratic society.

Camp Mary Mims a 4-H Club was named to honor Dr. Mary Mims.

In 1952, Mims retired.
