= Hotel Mims =

Historic hotel in Mims, Florida, US

- U.S. National Register of Historic Places
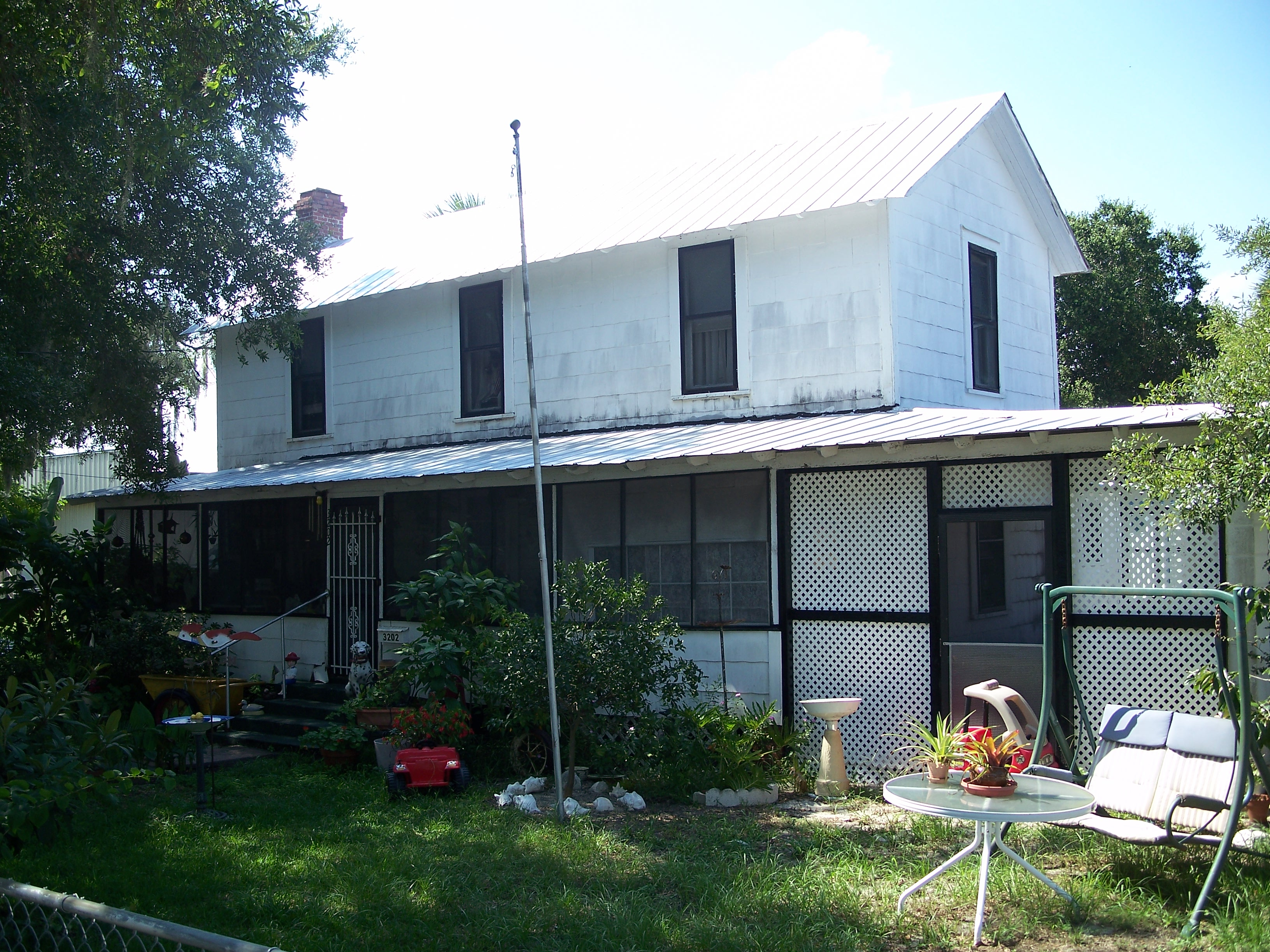

- Location within Florida Location within the United States
- Location: Mims, Florida
- Coordinates: 28°39′54″N 80°50′46″W
- NRHP reference No.: 95000913
- Added to NRHP: July 28, 1995

The Hotel Mims is a historic hotel in Mims, Florida. It is located at 3202 SR 46. On July 28, 1995, it was added to the U.S. National Register of Historic Places.
