= African Americans in Oregon =

Ethnic group in Oregon

Total population
- 137,000 including partially Black people (3.2% of Oregon's population); 81,000 alone (1.9%)

Regions with significant populations
- North and Northeast Portland • Gresham • Fairview

Languages
- English

Religion
- Christianity

Related ethnic groups
- African Americans

African Americans in Oregon or Black Oregonians are residents of the state of Oregon who are of African American ancestry. In 2017, there were an estimated 91,000 African Americans in Oregon.

== History ==
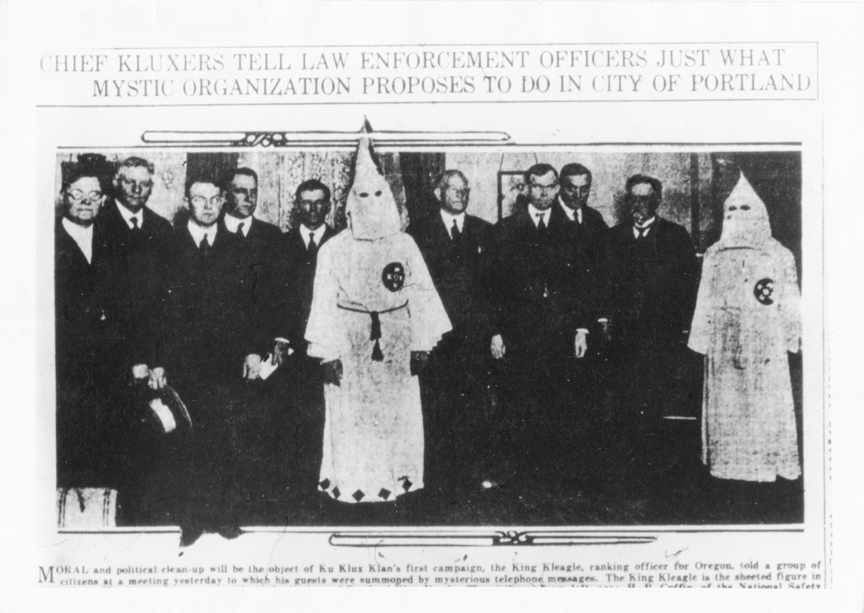
Politicians from Portland meet with the Ku Klux Klan, 1921

Black people likely began arriving in Oregon in the 1500s as free and enslaved passengers of English and Spanish ships. The first confirmed presence of a person of African descent in Oregon is Marcus Lopius, a crew member from Cape Verde aboard the American ship Lady Washington that reached Oregon in 1788. An enslaved man known as York came to Oregon in 1803 as part of the Lewis and Clark Expedition. Other early Black explorers came overland to Oregon as free trappers or as laborers for John Jacob Astor's Pacific Fur Company and the British Hudson Bay Company.

Both enslaved and free Black people settled in Oregon in the 1840s and 1850s. Although slavery had been outlawed in Oregon since the 1843 Organic Laws of Oregon, at least 40 enslaved Black people were brought to the Oregon Country. Some remained enslaved for years after their arrival.

According to Perseverance, "By 1860, African Americans were present in fourteen of the nineteen Oregon counties."

The Oregon black exclusion laws were attempts to prevent Black people from settling within the borders of the settlement and eventual U.S. state of Oregon. The first such law took effect in 1844, when the Provisional Government of Oregon voted to exclude Black settlers from Oregon's borders. The law authorized a punishment for any Black settler remaining in the territory to be whipped with "not less than twenty nor more than thirty-nine stripes" for every six months they remained. Additional laws aimed at African Americans entering Oregon were ratified in 1849 and 1857. The last of these laws was repealed in 1926. The laws, born of both anti-slavery and anti-Black beliefs, were often justified as a reaction to fears of Black people instigating Native American uprisings. The restrictions and laws prohibiting people of African descent from residing in the state caused socioeconomic issues that still exist today.

In the early 20th century, the African American population became heavily represented in the timber industry, transforming it into one of Oregon's most diverse trades.

== Vanport, Portland ==
The establishment of Vanport coincided with an unprecedented influx of African-Americans into Oregon, attracted to work in newly federally-desegregated wartime defense industries. Due to exclusionary racial laws, the state had a population of fewer than 1,800 Black people in 1940; by 1946 more than 15,000 lived in the Portland area, mostly in Vanport and other segregated housing districts. One prewar observer, Portland Urban League secretary Edwin C. Berry, described Portland as a "'northern' city with a 'southern' exposure", arguing that the city shared with Southern cities "traditions, attitudes, and things interracial in character." Berry argued that prior to the war, the city exhibited remarkably unprogressive racial attitudes.

The hastily constructed wartime development's social and cultural mores had little in common with Portland as a whole. Vanport's immigrants imported their particular brands of racism from throughout the country. White migrants from the South were the most vocal in opposing the degree of integration that the Housing Authority of Portland (HAP) dictated for schools, buses and work sites. The authority was largely unsympathetic to these complaints and at no time was de jure segregation imposed on any of Vanport's facilities. When police were called because Black men were dancing with White women at a local event, only the White women were detained and warned that their conduct might lead to a race riot.

HAP never had any explicit policy advocating segregation; nonetheless, for various reasons de facto segregation was the norm. Whites complained when placed near "Black" areas, and segregation of Vanport by neighborhood might as well have been enforced legally. Only in 1944 were complaints raised about the segregation situation in the city. Reacting to the criticism—and pressure from Eleanor Roosevelt—by April 1944, HAP began placing incoming "Blacks" into the "white" areas of the settlement. However, word quickly spread and 63 white residents quickly signed a petition demanding a reversal of the policy. Entire buildings were free in the "Black" areas of town, they argued, and after opponents of the integration plan appeared at a HAP meeting, the authority decided to resume its previous policies.

The unprecedented level of integration and lack of any major racial incidents or severe tensions did not mean there were no problems. Black–White tensions were still a part of Vanport life as well as a problem in relating to Portland. A 1943–1944 study published in the American Sociological Review indicates that the top five complaints from Vanport residents included "negroes and whites in same neighborhood", "negroes and whites in same school", and "discrimination against Vanport people by Portlanders".

Although some of Portland's Black people lived in 53 of the city's 60 census tracts before the war, about half were concentrated in two tracts east of the Willamette River and north of the east–west centerline of the city. After the war, much of Portland's Black community remained centered in northeastern parts of the city.

== Northeast Portland ==
Starting in the 1950s and 1960s, Black residents who were former Vanport residents and shipyard/industrial workers settled in the Northeast Portland area. Much of Portland's Black community, which is 6% of Portland's population, is concentrated within the northeast Portland area; Alberta Arts District and King both include large African American populations. ZIP codes in North and Northeast Portland are mainly at least 15 to 20% Black.

Today, Portland is 5.9% Black, and 7.8% including partially Black people.

== African immigrants ==
There are some Nigerian, Ethiopian, Eritrean, and Somali immigrants in Oregon, primarily in Portland. A killing of an Ethiopian man, Mulugeta Seraw, in the 1980s by white supremacists garnered attention towards the issue of racism toward Black and rAfrican Americans in Portland.

== Notable African American Oregonians ==
- Aminé, Rapper
- Tanya Barfield, playwright
- Dick Bogle, first Black television reporter in the Pacific Northwest
- Beatrice Morrow Cannady, civil rights activist and co-founder of the Portland branch of the NAACP
- Brandon Gonzáles, boxer of both Black and Mexican descent
- A.C. Green, professional basketball player
- Charles Jordan, first Black city commissioner for Portland
- Gladys McCoy, politician
- Harriet Redmond, suffragette
- McCants Stewart, first African-American lawyer in Oregon
- William Tebeau (1925–2013), civil engineer at ODOT and first African-American man to graduate from Oregon State University

== See also ==
- List of African-American newspapers in Oregon
- Native American peoples of Oregon
- Racism in Oregon
