= Lyllye Reynolds-Parker =

American civil rights activist and educator

Lyllye Reynolds-Parker (May 8, 1946 – August 22, 2024) was an American civil rights activist and educator. Born into one of the earliest Black families in Eugene, Oregon, she was a leader in the city's civil rights movement. She worked as a counselor at the University of Oregon's multicultural center. The university honored her by opening the Lyllye Reynolds-Parker Black Cultural Center in 2019.

== Early life ==
Lyllye Reynolds-Parker's parents, Sam and Mattie Reynolds, left the American South during the Great Migration in pursuit of employment. In 1942, they moved from Louisiana to Eugene, Oregon, becoming one of the city's first Black families. Reynolds-Parker's parents helped found St. Mark Christian Methodist Episcopal Church, Eugene's oldest Black congregation.

Lyllye Reynolds-Parker was born at Sacred Heart Medical Center. She was the first Black child born in Eugene. Her birth certificate identified her as White to avoid persecution by the Ku Klux Klan.

Racially restrictive covenants prevented her family from residing within city limits, so they settled across the Willamette River in the segregated Ferry Street Community, a collection of semi-permanent homes. When Reynolds-Parker was three, the city bulldozed her community to clear space for the Ferry Street Bridge. The construction followed a national movement of urban renewal that destroyed Black communities across the country. The Reynolds family relocated to a new Black neighborhood on West 11th Avenue, where Reynolds-Parker spent most of her childhood. Her house, like others in the area, lacked plumbing, running water, and electricity. The Black community provided safety and comfort. Reynolds-Parker recalled, "All the outside world was locked out when we were on West 11th; when we went home to our community, we were enveloped in a climate of love."

When Reynolds-Parker was in seventh grade, her house on West 11th Avenue burnt down, forcing the family to move once again, this time to downtown Eugene. The family would move several more times before she graduated high school, as residential displacement and new housing developments displaced Black tenants across Eugene.

Reynolds-Parker attended White elementary and middle schools. In 1964, she became one of the first three Black students to graduate from Eugene's Sheldon High School. She experienced discrimination in public education. When she told her middle school guidance counselor that she wanted to be the next Thurgood Marshall, the counselor told her to be "more realistic" because she was a "negro and a girl." Experiences like this inspired her to become a counselor at the University of Oregon, where she aimed to "open the door for every young woman, every woman of color, to be whoever she wants to be."

== Activism ==
Reynolds-Parker's mother, Mattie, inspired her political activism. In 1966, Mattie Reynolds became the first Black person to seek public office in Eugene when she ran for city council. Reynolds also founded the Eugene chapter of the Congress of Racial Equality (CORE), of which Reynolds-Parker later became a member. In high school, Reynolds-Parker served as Vice President of the Eugene Chapter of the Student Nonviolent Coordinating Committee (SNCC), where she trained in nonviolent civil disobedience. She has remained committed to racial justice throughout her life, serving as the honorary chair of the Anti-Racial Profiling Committee with the League of United Latin American Citizens in Eugene.

== Education and career ==
After years of activism, Reynolds-Parker took a job with the Southern Pacific Railroad under Lyndon B. Johnson's affirmative action program in 1969. She worked with the railroad for over eight years. When her children were older, Reynolds-Parker decided to pursue a college degree. She enrolled at the University of Oregon in 1986, the same year her daughter graduated from high school. A non-traditional student and single mother, Reynolds-Parker frequently mentored her younger college classmates. Reynolds-Parker graduated with a bachelor's degree in sociology in 1991.

Four years later, she returned to the University of Oregon to work as a counselor in the Multicultural Center, where she served students for seventeen years. Reynolds-Parker became a revered employee at the university, with students describing her as "legendary." She integrated activism into her advising, working to retain and welcome Black, Indigenous, Asian American Pacific Islander, and Latinx students at the university. Prior to her retirement in 2012, the University of Oregon Women's Center established the Lyllye B. Reynolds speaker series, which brings prominent women of color to campus for lectures.

== Lyllye Reynolds-Parker Black Cultural Center ==
In 2018, the University of Oregon broke ground on a new Black Cultural Center, at the urging of the Black Student Task Force. When the university sought public input on how to name the building, overwhelming support for Reynolds-Parker convinced the board of trustees to make an exception to its rule of naming buildings after donors who have died. In all, 84% of public respondents voted to name the building after her. These votes were supported by letters from the community and a memo from University President Michael Schill, which referred to her as "the epitome of resilience and perseverance." The university's first building named after a Black woman, the Lyllye Reynolds-Parker Black Cultural Center offers a dedicated space to Black students and provides educational and cultural programming.

== The Lyllye B. Parker Black, Indigenous and Women of Color Speaker Series ==
Hosted and presented by the UO Women's Center, they hold the annual Lyllye B. Parker Women of Color Speaker Series named after longtime local advocate for Students of Color, Lyllye B. Parker, hosts a keynote speaker who addresses the intersections of racism, sexism and other systems of oppression Black, Indigenous and Women of Color face on individual, institutional and societal levels.
