= The Shoppes at Gateway =

Shopping mall in Springfield, Oregon, USA

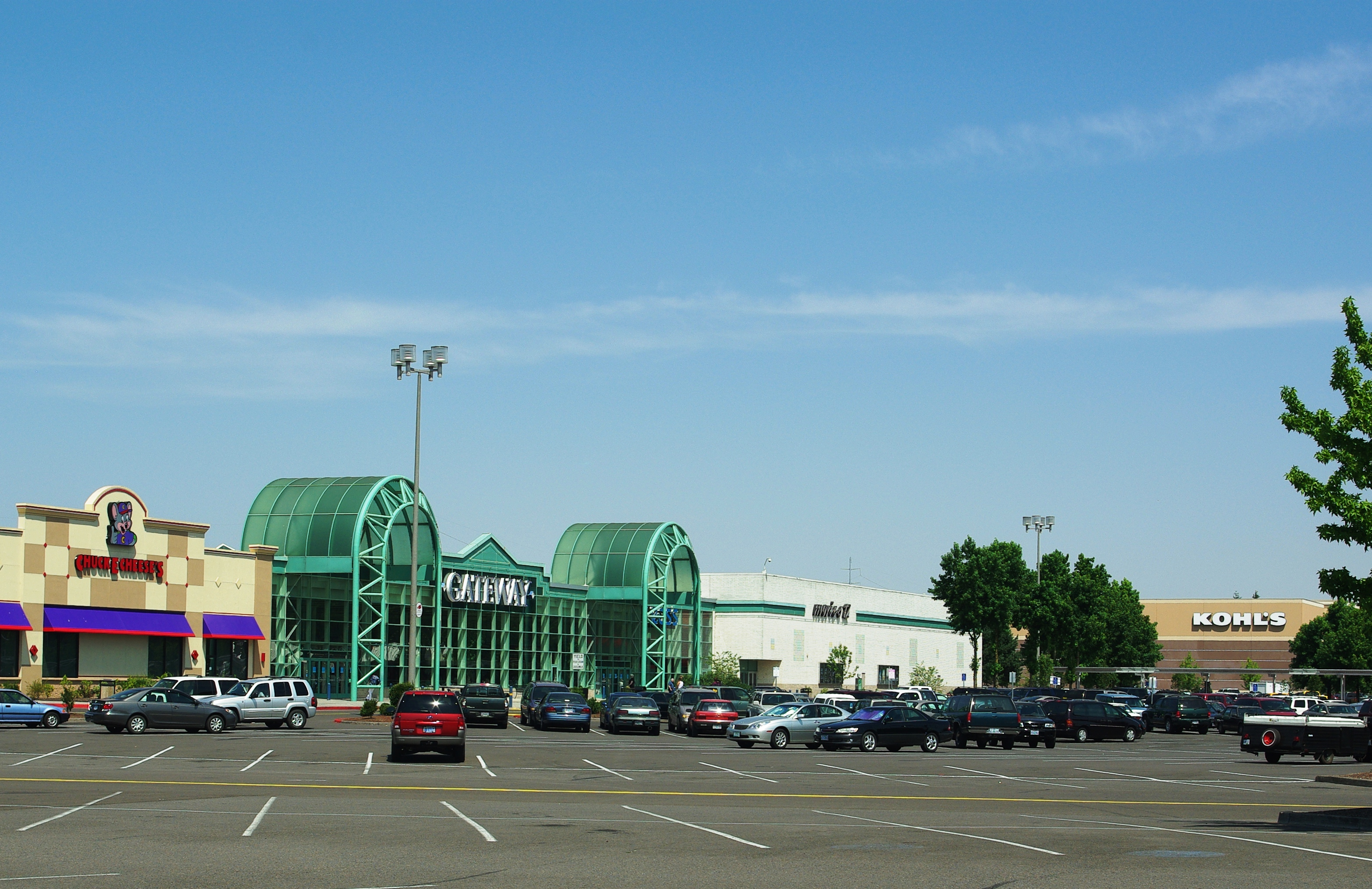
- The exterior of the mall as seen before the 2015 renovation.
- Location: Springfield, Oregon; 44.073743°N 123.045158°W
- Opened: 1990
- Developer: General Growth Properties
- Manager: Balboa Retail Partners
- Owner: Balboa Retail Partners
- Num. of stores: 58
- Num. of anchor tenants: 5
- Floor area: 820,000 square feet (76,000 m^{2})
- Floors: 1 (2 in Kohl's)
- Website: theshoppesatgateway.com

The Shoppes at Gateway, formerly Gateway Mall, is a shopping center located in Springfield, Oregon, United States owned and managed by Balboa Retail Properties. It has 820,000 square feet (76,000 m^{2}) of retail space. The mall opened in 1990 and is located next to Interstate 5, which largely divides the cities of Eugene and Springfield. Located at the mall is one Cinemark theater and 58 retail stores.

== History ==
Plans for a five-anchor shopping mall began in 1988. Gateway Mall opened in 1990 with stores including Target, Sears, and Troutman's Emporium as anchors. A 12-screen Cinemark theater was located adjacent to the food court. In 1999, a 17-screen Cinemark theater opened at the mall, and the 12-screen Cinemark became a second-run discount theater. Ross Dress for Less added a store in 2002. Kohl's built a new two-story department store at Gateway in 2006. The Troutman's later became Ashley Furniture, then Cabela's in 2011. On September 28, 2014, Movies 12 screened its final film, leaving Cinemark 17 as the only theater in the city of Springfield.

In 2015, redevelopment began on the mall. It was renamed The Shoppes at Gateway and partially converted to an outdoor format. New tenants in the redevelopment include Marshalls, Petco, Ulta, and Hobby Lobby, plus a relocated Ross.

In 2016, the mall was listed for sale by Jones Lang LaSalle Incorporated. The mall was sold to Balboa Retail Properties in March 2016 for a then-Lane County record high of $107 million.

On January 4, 2018, it was announced that Sears would be closing as part of a plan to close 103 stores nationwide. The store closed in April 2018. In February of 2024, it was announced that Crunch Fitness was going to open a location at the mall, occupying the former Sears building.

== See also ==
- List of shopping malls in Oregon
