= Eugene Station (Lane Transit District) =

Bus station in Eugene, Oregon, U.S.

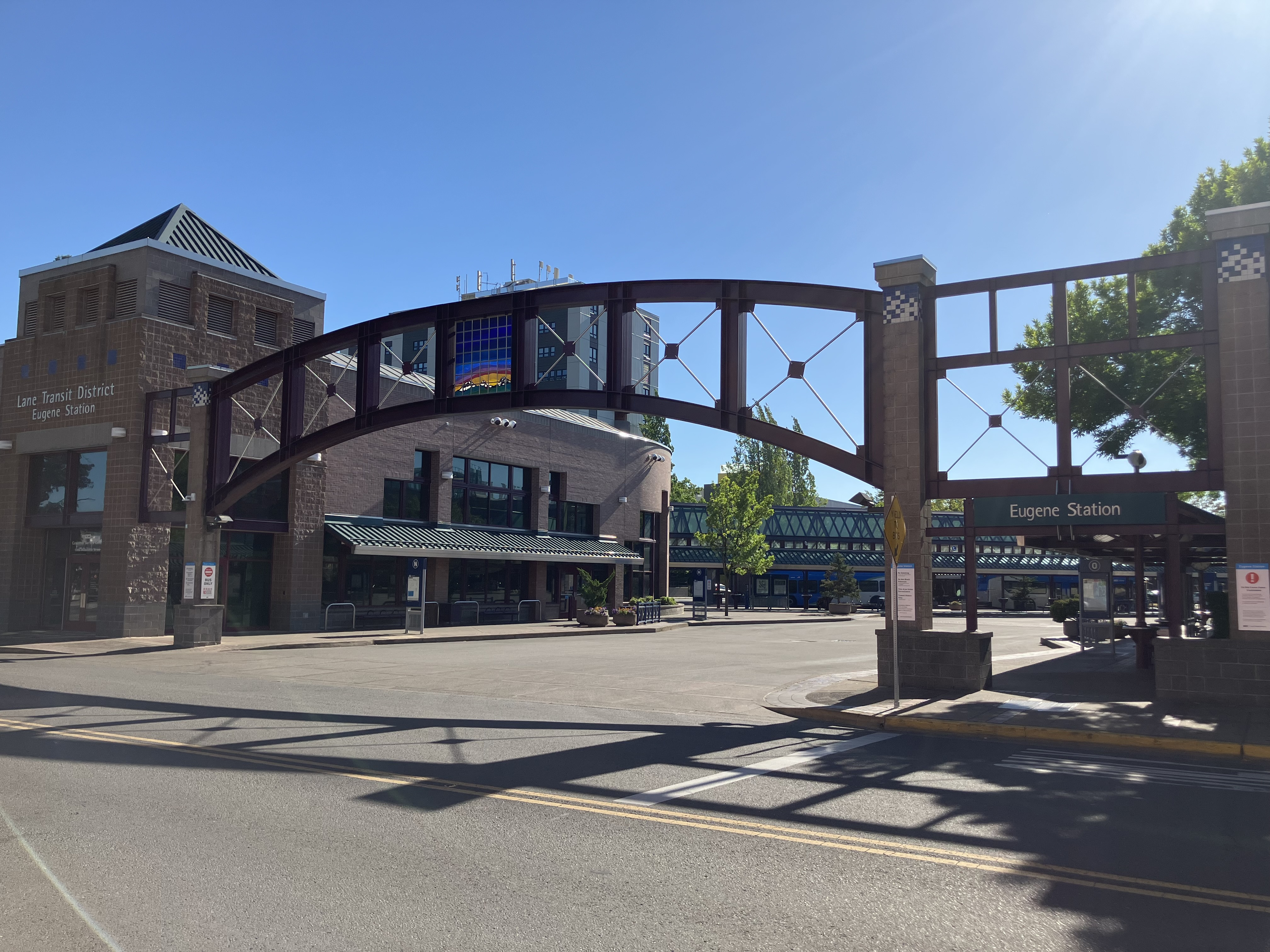
- Front of the station in June 2026

General information
- Coordinates: 44°2′53.64″N 123°5′36.38″W
- System: Bus terminus
- Platforms: 20 (A to T)
- Connections: Lane Transit District; Emerald Express (EmX); Diamond Express

Construction
- Parking: No
- Cycle facilities: Yes

History
- Opened: 1998
Location

Eugene Station is the primary bus station and terminus in Eugene, Oregon, United States, serving the buses of the Lane Transit District (LTD). Construction began with the official groundbreaking in 1996 and the station opened in April 4, 1998. The station covers most of a city block, and includes a clock tower featuring glass pyramids and arches inset with colorful glass blocks created by local glass artist John Rose. Bus lines include LTD's EmX service.
