= Racism in Oregon =

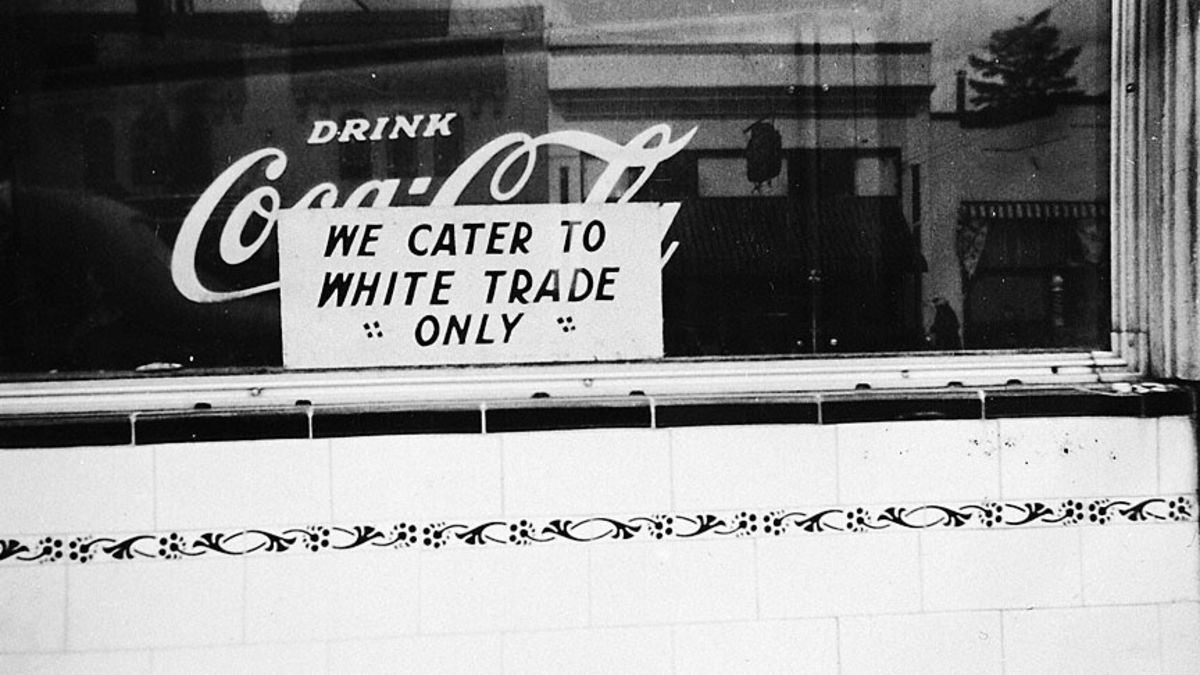
Front window sign on a business in 1943

The history of racism in Oregon began before the territory even became a U.S. state. The topic of race was heavily discussed during the convention where the Oregon Constitution was written in 1857. In 1859, Oregon became the only state to enter the Union with a black exclusion law, although there were many other states that had tried before, especially in the Midwest. The Willamette Valley was notorious for hosting white supremacist hate groups. Discrimination and segregation were common occurrences against people of Indigenous, African, Mexican, Hawaiian, and Asian descent. The California Gold Rush was known to be one of the first industrialized instances of slavery in the West and introduced many visiting miners from Oregon to its broad acceptance and support. Many returning miners and resettling Southern miners brought the pro-slavery movement from the Gold Rush back to Oregon, especially in the lower Southwest quarter of the territory.

== History ==
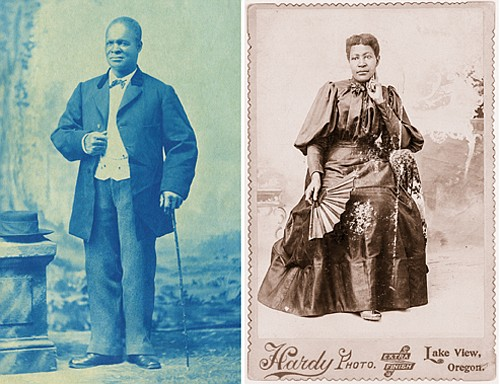
Pictured: Two unknown African-Americans living in Oregon in the mid to late 1800s

=== First arrival of black people: 1788 ===
The first known person of African descent to arrive in Oregon was a sailor named Markus Lopeus. Lopeus arrived in 1788 alongside merchant sea captain Robert Gray. Lopeus later died in an altercation with the local Native Americans. In the following years, black fur trappers and explorers settled in Oregon.

York, an enslaved man, was the only African American on the Lewis and Clark Expedition, which reached Oregon in 1805.

=== Anti-Black Exclusion Laws and Chinese immigration 1844–1859 ===
There are two incidents that led up to the creation of the first Black Exclusion Law of 1844 in Oregon Territory. The first was the Cockstock Affair, which is known to be the largest instance of potential violence against white settlers prior to the Whitman Incident in 1847. The Cockstock Affair started because James Saules (a black settler) reported that a Native known as Cockstock had stolen his newly purchased horse. White settlers who deemed themselves to be in charge of the territory tried to arrest Cockstock, but were met with a force of Natives much bigger than their own. Eventually, the Affair was resolved, but it left a good amount of fear in the white settlers of the potential threat the Native population posed. The second incident is referred to as the Saules-Pickett Dispute. Once again, James Saules (who had been in Oregon since 1841) was involved. Pickett accused Saules of assault and said in court during the trial that Saules threatened to incite the Natives against him. Other witnesses claimed they had also been threatened by Saules and his Native friends. No evidence to these claims was given, but Saules was tried and convicted.

Peter Burnett saw these incidents as his opportunity to present a new bill to the provisional government of the territory. He claimed that it was to prevent slavery from entering Oregon, but he used the Cockstock Affair and the Saules-Pickett dispute as evidence to persuade fellow lawmakers to exclude Black people from settling at all, for fear that they would band together with the Natives against the white settlers. In June 1844, Oregon enacted an exclusion law banning black people from living in Oregon. The punishment for violating the law was to be 39 lashes every six months until the occupant left, but this punishment was deemed too harsh and was replaced with forced labor in December 1844. Also in 1844, the provisional government prohibited slavery. Another discriminatory law was enacted in 1849, which barred Black people who were not already in the area from entering or residing in the Oregon territory. In 1851, a black businessman named Jacob Vanderpool was arrested and expelled from Oregon due to violating the laws regarding black residency.

In 1855, mixed race men were forbidden from becoming citizens. In 1857, despite slavery being illegal, a bill was proposed intending to protect slave property. It was not passed as it was seen as granting special rights to slave owners. That same year a new law was introduced which barred black people from holding property in the state. In 1850, the first Chinese immigrants would arrive and further immigration would take place over the coming decades.

In 1859, Oregon became the only state to enter the Union with a black exclusion law; it introduced a new law the same year prohibiting Black people from owning property and making contracts. The exclusion laws would remain in effect until 1926. In 2001, Measure 14 was introduced which was meant to eliminate racist language, such as "free Negroes and mulattoes," from the constitution. While the constitution itself would not be completely altered, the language would be changed. The measure was voted down in 2002, but later passed.

Ultimately, the Oregon Territorial government and the writers of the Oregon Constitution used the excuse of preventing slavery from entering Oregon to hide their true ambitions. They were not abolitionists, but white supremacists They wanted to create a white utopia. The motivations of these lawmakers were to remove people of color from their territory and in working towards that goal created laws that have had long lasting consequences.

=== Anti-Chinese exclusion laws, expulsions, massacres: 1862–1920s ===
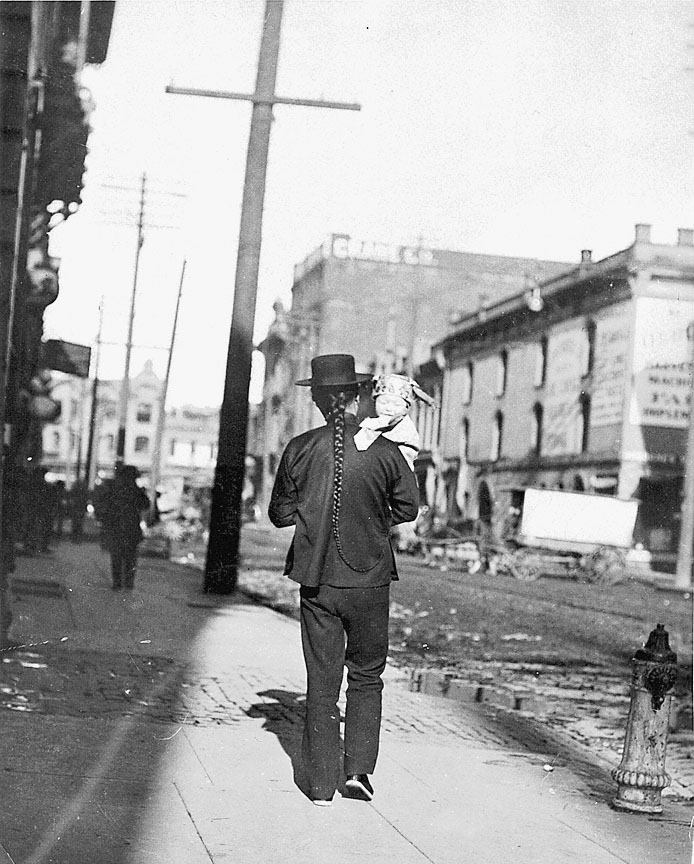
Chinese man and child in Oregon

An article in the Daily Oregonian decried the Chinese population as a racial menace who were polluting some of the city's "best streets." Similar remarks were made about the Chinese residents in Baker City calling them "Celestials," "Mongolians," and "Yellow Horde." In 1862, all people of Black, Chinese, Hawaiian, and Mulatto descent were taxed $5 ($128 in 2020 dollars). Failure to pay this tax would result in the state being able to force them into jobs maintaining state designed roads for 50 cents a day ($12 in 2020 dollars). Interracial marriage between black and white people was outlawed the same year, with the law specifically stating that white people could not marry anyone one-fourth black or more. This distinction was later extended to prevent white people from marrying anyone who was one-fourth or more Chinese or Hawaiian, and a half or more Native American.

In 1868, the Fourteenth Amendment to the U.S. Constitution was passed, granting citizenship to black people. Oregon originally ratified the Fourteenth Amendment on September 19, 1866, but rescinded that ratification on October 16, 1868. That Amendment was only re-ratified on April 25, 1973. In 1870, the Fifteenth Amendment, which prohibited denying the right to vote to racial minorities and former slaves, gained widespread ratification, with Oregon being one of eight states to reject it (in addition to New York's rescission of ratification). That same year, the federal law superseded a clause in the Oregon State Constitution banning black suffrage. It would not be until 1959 that Oregon would ratify the Fifteenth Amendment.

From 1870 to 1885, anti-Chinese sentiment began to rise amongst Oregon citizens, with labor and political leaders advocating for both the expulsion of Chinese residents and the exclusion of future Chinese from Oregon. In May 1873, the Portland city council passed a resolution encouraging contractors to not hire Chinese workers out of fear of losing future contracts (due to Chinese workers of time typically working for low wages and then sending the funds to their families). This resolution was ultimately refused. In August of that same year, a fire, allegedly instigated by white "incendiaries" hoping to displace the Chinese population, broke out at a Chinese laundry. In 1880, most Chinese men resided near Second and Oak Streets, which was so segregated that no other ethnicity beside Chinese lived there.

Sometime during the mid-1880s, Portland's Chinatown saw two of its buildings burn down and Chinese woodcutter camps were raided by eighty masked men. Rallies in support of the anti-Chinese club also took shape. In 1883, an attempt to remove the ban on black suffrage failed due in part to the clause being null and void by the Fifteenth Amendment's inclusion in the U.S. Constitution. Further attempts to remove the clause were made in 1895, 1916, and 1927 with the clause finally being removed in 1927.

In 1885, racial tensions were further exacerbated as about 500 Chinese residents were excluded from Tacoma, Washington, and sent to Portland. On February 22, 1886, a vote was held on the removal of the Chinese residents. Later that day, a Chinese camp at Guild's Lake was attacked by Local workers in East Portland who also drove out between 100 and 200 Chinese workers. Despite the state constitution banning Chinese people from mining, some still worked as miners and the next year a massacre was caused by a group of white men resulting in the deaths of 34 Chinese miners.

By 1890, 1,000 black people lived in Oregon, with that number doubling by 1920. In 1893, the white citizens of La Grande burned down the city's Chinatown. This displaced the residents of that area, and most left Oregon. Some, however, remained and attempt to resist the mob, but were ultimately forced to leave as well. That same year, Baker City Mayor Charles Palmer called for the Baker City Chinatown to be overhauled to "sanitary and moral conditions." Palmer viewed the Chinese as "a class ... that a community cannot afford to harbor or tolerate." Around this time, "sundown towns" started to appear.

From 1900 to 1940, the Oregon Chinese population began to diminish due to laws such as the Page Act of 1875 and the Chinese Exclusion Act of 1882. From 1940 to 1970, however, the number of Chinese people living in Oregon would increase. This was during the Exclusion era lasting from 1882 to 1943 which left Chinese communities isolated and discriminated against in fields such as housing, jobs, commercial opportunities, education, medical and social services.

In 1906, the legal case Taylor v. Cohn led to the Oregon Supreme Court sanctioning the right of white Americans to racially discriminate against Black people in theatres. In 1918, Black soldiers from California saw a sign that read "We employ white help and cater to white trade only." Angered, the men proceeded to destroy the sign. A similar occurrence happened in 1943. In the early 20th century, Black railroad workers coming to Portland faced extreme segregation. In 1919, the Realty Board of Portland had approved a Code of Ethics forbidding realtors and bankers from selling or giving loans to minorities for properties located in white neighbourhoods. That same year, a law making public discrimination illegal was proposed. The law would be passed in 1953. African Americans who did move to Portland in the early 20th century, mostly railroad workers, faced extreme segregation.

"No Negros, Chinese, or Japanese shall own or occupy property in this neighborhood unless they are a worker or a servant."

— An example of the covenants found in Milwaukie.

In the 1920s, racially restrictive housing covenants came into prominence. These covenants allowed communities to be created that excluded certain ethnic and religious groups. These covenants came after widespread housing discrimination of past decades. These covenants were made unenforceable by the federal Civil Rights Act of 1968.

=== WWII and onwards: 1944–present ===
During World War II, the incentive of shipyard jobs caused a boom in the African American population. Portland's African American population grew from 2,565 in 1940 to 25,000 in 1944. With this, an increase in the racism that imbued the private industries and labour unions of the time followed. Due to union rules, black workers were prevented from doing specialized jobs such as stevedores, truck drivers, and laundry workers and were instead relegated to doing common labour. After the war, racism against black Oregonians continued. Some African-Americans lost their jobs due to white soldiers returning, and black residents were told to leave by Earl Riley, the mayor of Portland, who stated they were not welcome. In response, groups resisting racism and promoting equality began to emerge. These included the National Association for the Advancement of Colored People (NAACP), the Urban League, the Office of Vocational Opportunity, and the Committee on Inter-Racial Principles and Practices.

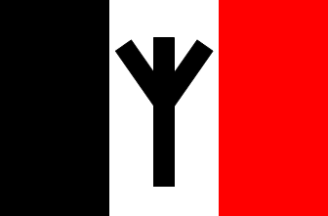
Algiz rune on Volksfront flag

In 1951, the laws prohibiting interracial marriages and insurance surcharges for non-white drivers were removed. By the early 1960s, Black people in Portland were barred from being served at white restaurants, going to the city funded swimming pools, and skating in ice rinks, with the exception of the day set aside for black people to skate. In the 1970s, multiple black men were killed by the police in Portland, and in the 1980s, the Portland Police Bureau was investigated after officers killed possums and placed them in front of black-owned restaurants.

In 1981, amid national unrest relating to the Atlanta murders of 1979–1981, two Portland police officers placed dead opossums outside the Burger Barn, a Black-owned restaurant. The officers were fired; the Oregonian Editorial Board supported the firing in a March 28 editorial which articulated the racial implications of the act. The two were later reinstated when an arbitrator deemed the firing excessive; the FBI investigated the matter for six months, but ultimately declined to bring charges. The police paid part of a settlement.

Ivancie removed the Police Bureau from the portfolio of City Commissioner Charles Jordan, then the only Black member of Portland City Council. The move sparked a protest, led by Ron Herndon. The Portland Internal Investigations Auditing Committee (PIIAC) was formed by City Council over the opposition of Mayor Frank Ivancie, who was closely tied with the Police Bureau, in response to the incident, in 1982. The police union organized a petition drive to bring the formation of the committee before voters, but voters approved the committee.

In 1985, two Portland police officers who had been caught distributing T-shirts with the slogan "Don't Choke 'Em, Smoke 'Em" were reinstated by an arbitrator after having been fired.

In the 1980s, Portland saw a major increase in white power skinhead groups, which primarily targeted people of color and their allies, members of the Indigenous community, Jewish people, and members of the LGBTQ community. Tom Metzger's neo-Nazi organization White Aryan Resistance (WAR) actively recruited members out of Portland's skinhead community, and worked with local groups such as East Side White Pride. Metzger was a supporter of the Northwest Imperative, a separatist movement that sought to create a white ethnostate in the U.S. northwest. Another neo-Nazi group known as Volksfront began operations in the 1990s.

On the night of November 12, 1988, 28 year-old Ethiopian student Mulugeta Seraw was murdered by a group of white supremacists affiliated with East Side White Pride and WAR. Metzger endorsed the attack, while one of the perpetrators—Kenneth Murray "Death" Mieske—admitted in court testimony that the attack was premeditated based on race. The murder of Seraw sparked a movement of Skinheads Against Racial Prejudice (SHARP) in Portland, rooted in the city's hardcore punk scene. The racist and anti-racist skinheads got into confrontations—often referred to as the "skinhead wars"—in public locations such as Pioneer Courthouse Square. Ciaran Mulloy, a union organiser and anti-fascist, recalled how "there were multiple gangs, and 300 Nazis in a city of 300,000", further stating that "the anti-racist youth were intimidated and isolated. The Nazis were just openly hanging out on the streets." In the wake of the murder, Mic Crenshaw and a number of other activists relocated from Minnesota to Portland to establish a local chapter of Anti-Racist Action (ARA). In 1993, a racist skinhead named Eric Banks was shot dead by the anti-racist skinhead John Bair.

On November 5, 2002, 70% of Oregon voted to remove obsolete and offensive language from the Oregon Constitution such as "negroes", "mulattoes", and "whites". In 2007, neo-Nazis attempted to gather in Portland for a three-day skinhead festival. In 2011 an audit, designed to find if that Black and Latino renters were unfairly disadvantaged in regards to the housing market, found that in 64% of the 50 tests done, discrimination took place. This discrimination violated local, state and federal housing laws; however, as of May 2011 no action had been taken against the landlords who discriminated. This audit came after a similar one in 2009 which found that landlords discriminated against Black renters in two-thirds of the tests in Ashland and 78% of the tests in Beaverton.

In 2017, a double murder was committed by white supremacist Jeremy Joseph Christian. On August 17, 2019, a rally was held by among others, members of the American Guard and The Daily Stormer who are white nationalists and neo-Nazis respectively according to the Southern Poverty Law Center.

== Albina ==
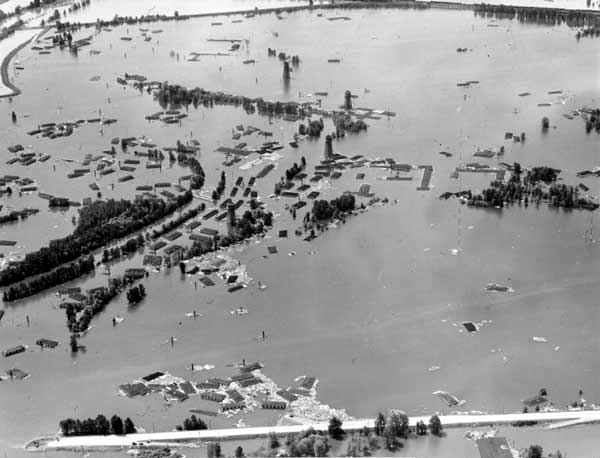
Aerial view of the Vanport flood, looking west from North Denver Avenue on June 15, 1948

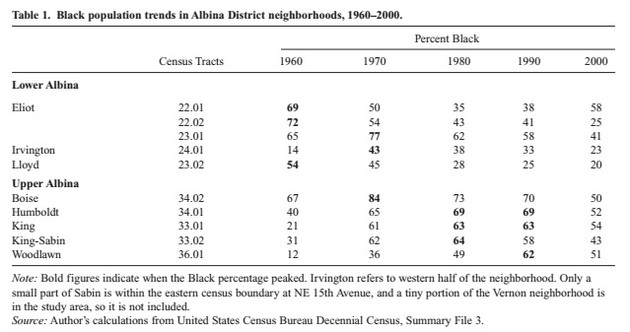
A table showcasing the Black population trends in Albina from 1960 to 2000.

In May 1948 the residents of Vanport, including its sizeable black population totalling over 6,300, would soon become displaced because of a flood that destroyed the city. Due to Albina being the only place where black people could purchase a house it soon becomes the dominant spot for black residents. As such it gained a reputation among white citizens as a "blighted slum in need of repair". In 1956, an arena was built displacing over 476 residents, half of whom were black. Further damage to black-owned properties would take place via the construction of the Veterans Memorial Coliseum and Interstate 5 in 1960 and the local hospital expansion in 1972 which would clear out 300 homes and businesses.

In the 1970s and 1980s, redlining and discrimination by the banks would affect the local black residents causing most to leave. This meant prime reinvestment. In 1988, when the majority of the houses were abandoned and the city terrorized by drugs and gang warfare. Businesses and houses were bought up by white residents, causing racial tensions to heighten as many black residents suffered due to their inability to pay the increased tax. By 1999, the black population of Albina owned 36% fewer homes than they had a decade earlier, while the white population owned 43% more. The displacement of black citizens in Albina continued in the early 2000s.

Resistance to displacement has taken place, such as in 2014 when a Trader Joe's was set to be built, possibly causing more displacement by further gentrifying the area. Resistance took place in the form of a letter written by the Portland African American Leadership Forum protesting its installation. Trader Joe's ultimately pulled out. The act of resistance was largely reported by conservative blogs to be one of racism and discrimination towards white people. This viewpoint was conversely critiqued.

== Ku Klux Klan presence ==
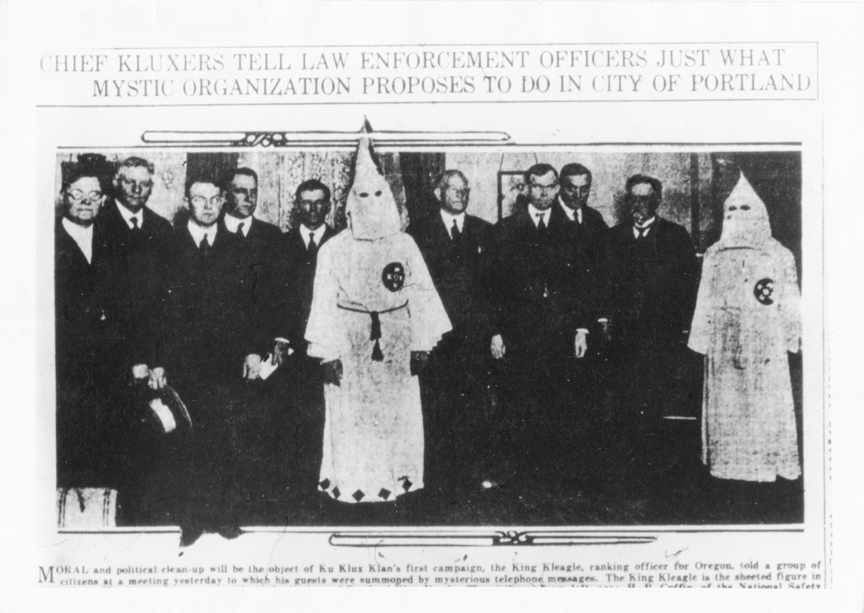
Photograph of KKK meeting with Portland leaders.

In the 1920s, Oregon had the largest Ku Klux Klan (KKK) membership per capita in the United States. On August 2, 1921, members of the KKK met with Portland government officials to discuss the recent negative press against the KKK as well as the supposed collaboration of Klan members and city officials. Notably the meeting featured Fred L. Gifford, a former line superintendent for the Northwestern Electric Company.

Gifford was the grand dragon of the Oregon Ku Klux Klan from 1921 to 1924. Gifford's purpose within the Klan was to recruit new members and gain influence in government. Gifford succeeded in doing so, recruiting over thousands of members, including politicians, such as Kaspar K. Kubli, a state legislator and speaker of the Oregon House of Representatives. Gifford was later nominated as the candidate for the primary election for U.S. Senate, serving as the Oregon representative, which Gifford declined.

By 1921, Klan membership was steadily increasing due to them capitalising on the racism against minorities (particularly Chinese and Japanese), antisemitism, anti-Catholicism, and social morality. KKK member Walter M. Pierce was elected governor in 1922. Over 35,000 members were claimed by the Klan leaders to be active in 1923. By the mid-1920s the KKK's presence began to fade, leading to most klaverns in the area to be non-existent by the end of the 1930s.

== Legacy and modern solutions ==
According to Matt Novak of media outlet Gizmodo, Oregon "today still exists as a white utopia in some respects". Due to "Nearly two centuries of exclusion, violence and intimidation", Portland is among the whitest major cities in the United States. In 2019 the population was nearly 87% white (excluding Hispanic or Latino demographics, the number becomes 75%). In 2016 around 38,000 African Americans lived in Portland with over 10,000 of them having to move to the outskirts from the city due to gentrification. In Portland the gentrification of the historically black neighborhood Albina has caused conflict between long-time black residents and new white residents. Wider gentrification has displaced many black residents in north and northeast Portland. A blog entitled "Shit White People Say to Black and Brown Folks in PDX [Portland]", which details people of color's encounters with white citizens, once claimed that "Most of the people who live here in Portland have never had to directly, physically and/or emotionally interact with PoC [people of color] in their life cycle." According to Walidah Imarisha and James Loewen, sundown towns still have a strong presence within Oregon.

A 2014 report by the Portland State University and the Coalition of Communities found that not only do black families fall far behind white families in Portland in regards to employment, health outcomes, and high-school graduation rates, but that in 2010 only 32% of African Americans in Multnomah County owned houses, which was 13% lower than the national average for African Americans and 28% lower than White Americans in the same county. Also that year almost two-thirds of black single mothers in Multnomah County with children under five lived in poverty which was higher than the average for the rest of nation, being over half. Just the year before White Americans in Multnomah County made around $70,000 while African Americans made around $34,000, which is $8,000 below the national average. Overall the report concluded that "Oregon has been slow to dismantle overtly racist policies", and so African Americans in Multnomah County suffer as a result and have to deal with the lasting effects of "racialized policies, practices, and decision-making". The Portland African American population were also found to be disproportionately affected by crime, accounting for 45% of the city's homicide victims and 27% of its jail population. African American children in Portland were also found to be expelled the most from school, starting from Kindergarten. Native American children were the next highest.

While Oregon was overt with its racist laws, the laws themselves were not too different from those formed elsewhere in the nation:

Oregon is a useful case study for the rest of the nation because the only thing unique about Oregon is [it] was bold enough to write it down. The same policies, practices and ideologies that shaped Oregon, shaped the nation as a whole.

She also stated that racist practises of the past are "not only alive" but serve as "the foundation for the institutions of Oregon", and that "Portland has, in many ways, perfected neoliberal racism". Imarisha has also commented on how at events she does around Oregon on the history of black inhabitants, Neo-Nazis have frequently harassed her with "sexually explicit comments" and death threats.

Hoping to dispel racism within Oregon, actions such as police reform have been flaunted. Governor Kate Brown in particular has passed juvenile justice reforms and has worked to reduce harsh prison sentences and reinvest in crime prevention and drug rehabilitation. In 2020, during the George Floyd protests she partook in community listening sessions with Black organizers on the matter of meaningful social change. Brown intended to implement reforms suggested by the People of Color Caucus at the aforementioned hearings but never followed through.

In an attempt to catalogue and remove racially restrictive housing covenants graduate student, Greta Smith has begun to create a database of said covenants alongside a map of where people of color were excluded from. Government officials have also allowed homeowners to request the removal of racist language in home covenants.

In 2012, intending to make amends with those displaced by the expansion to Legacy Emanuel Hospital, several events have been held such as breakfasts and hearings dedicated to the previous residents. That same year an exhibit was erected "to honor the neighborhood's history and accept the hospital's role in devastating it". The hospital also made a promise that the such an act will never be repeated. Some people, such as Lolenzo Poe, Portland Public Schools' chief equity and diversity officer criticised the actions by the hospital as ineffective. Some, however, praised the hospital for being the first institution to acknowledge the pain felt by those affected. In other attempts to fix racial bias, Emanuel has worked with minority contractors and actively hired minority workers to better the "racial makeup" of its staff.

In 2017, CBSN presented the documentary film Portland: Race Against the Past, which focused on racism in Portland.

== See also ==
- History of African Americans in Oregon
- Ethnic groups in Portland, Oregon
- Red Summer
