= Oregon Rangers =

Settler militia in the Willamette Valley, Oregon, U.S.

- Active: 1844–1846
- Country: Provisional Government of Oregon
- Type: militia
- Engagements: Battle Creek, Oregon

Commanders
- Notable commanders: Thomas Dove Keizur, Captain Charles Bennett, First Lieutenant A.A. Robinson

The Oregon Rangers were two 19th-century settler militia in the Willamette Valley of the contested Oregon Country. The first was established in response to the Cockstock incident and quickly dissolved. The second was formed in 1846 but only lasted few months.

== First militia ==
=== Background ===
The Cockstock Incident was climax of a dispute between a Molala named Cockstock and two black settlers, Winslow Anderson and James D. Saules over a horse. On 4 March 1844, Cockstock arrived at Oregon City, where anxious settlers soon attempted to capture him. In the ensuing skirmish, Anderson killed Cockstock by smashing his rifle into the native's skull. Two white settlers, LeBreton and Sterling Rogers, were killed from injuries sustained in the fight. The event has been called "the most significant occurrence of violence" in the Oregon Country between indigenous peoples and settlers prior to the Cayuse War.

=== Creation and end ===
The Oregon Rangers was organised on 23 March 1844 in response to the Cockstock incident. The militia members were given orders to meet at the Oregon Institute. A total of 25 men enlisted in the group. The militia was initially led by Captain Thomas D. Keizur, who resigned shortly after its creation, with Charles H. Bennett taking command. Among the members included Webley John Hauxhurst, Lindsay Applegate, William H. Gray, and Daniel Waldo.

Members of the Oregon Rangers were expected to provide their own weapons and supplies. The Provisional Government promised $2 daily for active service. Despite being "aimed as much at the Hudson's Bay Company as at the Indians", the company never entered combat and was quickly disestablished. Frances Fuller Victor gave a negative assessment of the initial militia, stating there was a lack "any deeds of prowess performed by the rangers..."

== Second militia ==
=== Reformation ===
The organization was revived in May 1846 at Daniel Waldo's farm in the Waldo Hills. Many of the 45 members who agreed to create a mounted rifle company were a part of the previous militia. The agreement read in part:

"That we, as citizens of said territory, in pursuance of this duty, forthwith organize ourselves into a company of mounted riflemen, and pledge ourselves to abide by such rules, regulations and laws as may be adopted by a majority of the company."
"Resolved, That this company shall be called "The Oregon Rangers.""

Among those selected as officers of the company included: Captain Charles Bennett, First Lieutenant A. A. Robinson, Second Lieutenant Isaac Hutchins, Third Lieutenant Hiram English, and orderly sergeant Thomas Holt. Many in the group had some military experience, including Bennett and Holt, who had been in the Seminole War as dragoons.

On July, 4 1846 Mrs. Mary Holden presented an American flag to the company, it was one of the first American flags made in Oregon.

=== Battle Creek Incident ===
In June 1846 a band of Wascos arrived in the Willamette Valley and camped on the Santiam River. The band was probably on a seasonal berry gathering excursion, a traditional movement that "almost certainly dates back hundreds of years." Rumors began to spread among the pioneer settlements accusing these Wascos of thefts, including livestock formerly owned by the Methodist Mission.

An estimated forty Rangers rode about 14 miles to location occupied by the band, under the command of Robinson, near what became known as Battle Creek in Marion County, Oregon. A short skirmish ensued with one Ranger collapsing from heat exhaustion and one Wasco injured by David Daily. The Rangers soon retreated a short distance and then opened fire with their longer range rifles.

=== Resolution ===
A parley ensued, with the Wascos upset and angered by the unprovoked attack, and they denied the accusations of their supposed thefts. As there was no evidence to support the settlers' claims, the Rangers offered a horse and some blankets as reparations to the injured native. The poor judgment and action by the Rangers led to ridicule by fellow settlers and the company was disbanded.

== Bibliography ==
=== Articles ===
- Taylor, Quintard (1982). "Slaves and Free Men: Blacks in the Oregon Country, 1840-1860". Oregon Historical Quarterly. 83 (2): 153–170. ISSN 0030-4727. JSTOR 20613841.

=== Books ===
- Allen, A. J. (1848). Ten Years in Oregon. Ithaca, NY: Mack, Andrus, & Co. pp. 230–237.
- Brown, J. Henry (1892). Brown's Political History of Oregon: Provisional Government. Portland, OR: Wiley B. Allen. LCCN rc01000356. OCLC 422191413. Archived from the original on 2015-04-13 – via Google Books.
- Clarke, Samuel A. (1905). Pioneer Days of Oregon History. Vol. 2. Portland, OR: The J. K. Gill Co. – via Google Books.
- La Fayette, Grover (1853). The Oregon Archives. Salem, OR: A. Bush – via Google Books.
- Horner, John B. (1919). Oregon: Her History, Her Great Men, Her Literature. Portland, OR: The J. K. Gill Co. – via Internet Archive.
- Ruby, Robert H.; Brown, John A. (1988). Indians of the Pacific Northwest: A History. Norman, OK: University of Oklahoma Press. ISBN 9780806121130 – via Google Books.
- Victor, Frances Fuller (1894). Early Indian Wars of Oregon. Salem, OR: Frank C. Baker – via Internet Archive.
- Whaley, Gray H. (2010). Oregon and the Collapse of Illahee. Chapel Hill, NC: University of North Carolina Press.

=== Newspapers ===
- T'Vault, William G., ed. (1846-06-11). "[Willamette, May 22, 1846]". Oregon Spectator. Vol. 3. Oregon City, OR. p. 1.

=== Websites ===
- Coleman, Kenneth R. (2020). "Cockstock Incident". The Oregon Encyclopedia. Oregon Historical Society. Archived from the original on 2020-09-28.
