= William Henry Mitchell =

American businessman

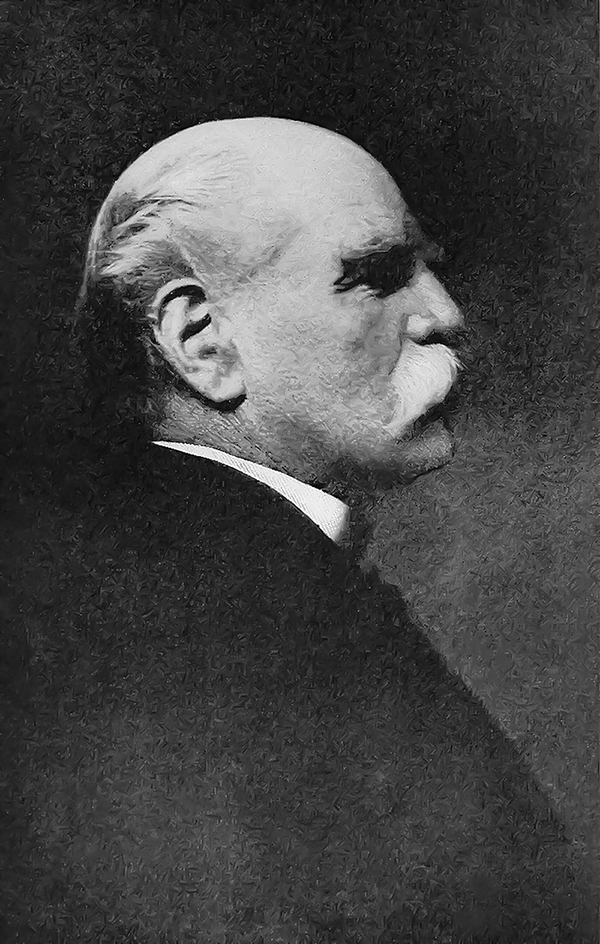
- Born: November 13, 1834; Chicago, Illinois
- Died: March 14, 1919 (aged 84); Los Angeles, California
- Education: Beloit College
- Occupations: Businessman; member of the Washington State Legislature; joint councilman a joint councilman for Thurston and Lewis counties; sheriff and deputy sheriff in Olympia, Washington; director of the Olympia Branch Railroad Co. and the Thurston County Railroad Co.; director of the Mitchell, Lewis & Starver Company
- Years active: 1853 – 1909
- Organizations: Pioneer's Association of the State of Washington; Washington Territorial Volunteers
- Known for: A pioneer, businessman, and politician from Olympia, Washington. Was a member of the city and state legislatures. Developed a number of businesses in the city, built a railroad connection between Olympia and Northern Pacific Railway, and developed the family business: the Mitchell–Lewis Wagon Manufactory (later Mitchell, Lewis & Starver Company).
- Political party: Democrat
- Spouse: Martha T. Jones (married 1859 – 1896)
- Children: 5
- Parents: Henry Mitchell (father); Margaret Mitchell (mother)

William Henry Mitchell (November 13, 1834 – March 14, 1919) was a pioneer of the Washington Territory and Olympia who made big contributions to the city's industrial and business development. He was a member of the Washington State Legislature and the Pioneer's Association of the State of Washington, an Olympian Town Trustee and a joint councilman for Thurston and Lewis counties.

Mitchell was one of the Great American Plains emigrants, among the first to cross the Naches Pass, a member of Washington Territorial Volunteers, and a ranger during the Yakima War. After the war, he served as sheriff and deputy sheriff of Olympia.

During his long career in Olympia, Mitchell owned a grocery store and developed the bakery and butcher businesses, working in the field for over eleven years. He entered the lumber business, investing $20,000 ($531,000 in 2020 dollars) into a sawmill in Tumwater, Washington owning a mill in Olympia. He was engaged in the lumber business for fourteen years. Under Mitchell's management, the railroad line between Olympia and Tenino was built, connecting the city to the Northern Pacific Railway.

In later years, Mitchell returned to his family business: the manufacture of the Mitchell wagons, which were famous around the U.S. Mitchell participated in the merger of several companies into the family business; after the merge he became the president of the Mitchell, Lewis & Starver Company. Under his direction, branch firms in Portland and Seattle were opened. After his retirement from the business Mitchell designed, built, and managed the Mitchell Hotel in Olympia.

== Early life, family, and education ==
William Mitchell was born on November 13, 1834, in Chicago, Illinois. His parents, Henry Mitchell and Margaret Mitchell, were married in Scotland and had eight children, of which William was the eldest. Both of Mitchell's parents were communicants in the Baptist church. Mitchell's father, born in Aberdeen, Scotland, emigrated to Chicago and became a successful manufacturer of the Mitchell wagon, a product known all around the U.S. The family moved from Chicago to Kenosha, Wisconsin, and then to Racine, where huge wagon works were built. At the same time, Mitchell's father established the Mitchell & Lewis Company. The next generations kept on developing and working in the business until 1983.

Despite travelling a lot, Mitchell had time to attend the public schools of Kenosha, Wisconsin, and spent a year in Beloit College.

== Journey through the Great Plains ==
In 1853, aged 18, Mitchell decided to go to the Oregon Territory. Mitchell's family was against the trip, but after the argument was settled, they found him travel companions: Samuel Holmes and his family. Together with other emigrants, they started their journey on April 9, 1853. The first stop was at Council Bluffs, where Mitchell lost almost all of his money in a card game, and where his team joined a train of 20 wagons to continue the journey together. They left on June 3, crossed the Missouri River (or the Mississippi River), and continued their journey along the Platte River. The travel became more difficult and dangerous. There were more natives, following or watching the train from the distance. Despite being armed, two immigrants were killed by natives near the Snake River. Mitchell shot himself in near the Boise River, and had to cut the bullet out with a knife. In his own words, that shot was accidental: his gun "slipped from its holster and was discharged."

In his memoir, Mitchell stated that their train reached Fort Kearny on July 4, but a later brochure assumed he may have been referring to Fort Hall, based on the distance provided by Mitchell.

One last stop before getting to Fort Walla Walla was La Grande, Oregon, where the travelers stopped to buy provisions, and Mitchell witnessed a woman being stolen from their camp by a trader. Reaching Fort Walla Walla, the wagon train split. Mitchell's party decided to go over Naches Pass through the Cascade Range and to Fort Steilacoom. This was a historic passage, for it was the first party to ever cross the Naches Pass, opening the region for more settlers. From there, Mitchell went on to Olympia, arriving October 6, 1853, around the same time as Governor Isaac Stevens.

== Career start and participation in Yakima War ==
In the beginning of his time in Olympia, Washington, Mitchell had a number of jobs: cutting cordwood, assisting in a blacksmith shop, and participating in the wholesale cattle business. In 1855 or 1856, during the Indian War, Mitchell served as a member of Washington Territorial Volunteers, and then became a ranger, taking part in the battle at White River. After the conflict with the naives, Mitchell helped build a stockade in Olympia, where women and children from the surrounding country could be sheltered. In 1857, Mitchell was elected the sheriff of Thurston County, staying in the position for several years. Later, he served as deputy sheriff, and the execution of Chief Leschi, a chief of the Nisqually Native American tribe, was assigned to Mitchell and his subordinates.

== Career after the war ==
=== Bakery, butcher and lumber businesses ===
After the war, in 1856, Mitchell entered the bakery and butcher businesses in Olympia with a partner, John Stewart. They had an affiliate house in Seattle. After eleven years, the partners decided to separate. According to one book, Mitchell purchased his partner's interest and the business kept going until 1873; in another account, Stewart took the Seattle branch and Mitchell was assigned everything else, selling his part in 1867. During this time, Mitchell and Stewart owned a two-story building at the corner of the 3rd and Main streets that was used as a grocery store. (Note: One account stated that Mitchell was the one to erect the building; however, in Mitchell's own account, the building was bought during his partnership with John Stewart.)

In 1868, together with Ira Ward and S. M. Cooper, Mitchell invested $20,000 ($531,000 in 2020 dollars (Note: The approximate value converted to 2020 dollars, based on a standard adjustment of the 1913 dollar value using the Consumer Price Index as calculated by United States Department of Labor.)) into a sawmill in Tumwater, Washington, near Olympia, and opened the firm Ward & Mitchell. He also owned a sawmill in Olympia. Mitchell was joined in the lumber business by his brother-in-law, another Olympian pioneer, Bennet W. Johns, with whom he worked for fourteen years.

=== Connecting Olympia to Northern Pacific Railway ===
In the 1870s, Mitchell was involved in the railroad business. He established a committee that raised funds to build a line connecting Olympia to the Northern Pacific Railway. The Olympia Branch Railroad Co. was organized in 1870, and Mitchell was elected director. However, the company couldn't build the line, and in 1877, it was replaced by the Thurston County Railroad Co., where Mitchell served as director and later was elected superintendent. This time they were successful, and the railroad was finished in July, 1878. It connected with Northern Pacific at Tenino, Washington.

=== Returning to the family business ===
Mitchell successfully directed his businesses until 1881 or 1882, then disposed of them and returned to Portland, Oregon, to work for the Mitchell–Lewis Wagon Manufactory Pacific agency, his father's business. In 1892, Mitchell participated in the merger of several companies into the family business; after the merge, he became the president of the Mitchell, Lewis & Starver Company. Under his direction, branch firms in Portland and Seattle were opened. He retired from this position in 1897, but remained the nominal head of the company until 1909.

=== Building of the Mitchell Hotel ===
Returning to Olympia, Mitchell contributed to the city's layout by designing and erecting the Mitchell Hotel on the corner of Main and 7th streets in 1903. (Note: A newspaper article was published in 1903 about the building's dedication ceremony, its features, and the terms of construction work. However, a book published much later gave a later origin year for the building–1906.) This was a modern brick and concrete building, with heating, hot and cold water, and electricity. For some time, Mitchell managed the hotel himself.

=== Other positions ===
During his years in Olympia, Mitchell occupied a number of positions. He was elected a member of the state legislature, supported by the common public, industrial, and commercial circles; a delegate to the Democratic County Convention in Olympia; an elected town trustee and a joint councilman for Thurston and Lewis counties; a trustee of the Baptist Church of Olympia; and a member of the Pioneer's Association of the State of Washington.

== Personal life ==
On April 13, 1859, Mitchell married Martha T. Jones, a native of Tennessee, who had crossed the plains in the same wagon train as he when they were young. Her father, Bennet L. Johns, was a Seattle pioneer. The Mitchells had five children; one child, William Walter, died in infancy. Frank W. and Harry W. both occupied the managerial positions in Portland and Seattle branches of the Mitchell–Lewis Wagon Manufactory; Albert B. suffered from blindness and also participated in the family business. Cora Edith married A. L. Young of San Francisco, according to Mitchell's own account as well as another source; according to Prosser, a founder of the Washington State Historical Society, she married an Oregon Railroad & Navigation Company worker McCorgnadale (or McCoquadale). Mitchell's wife died in 1896, and he never remarried.

After the death of his wife and retirement from business, Mitchell built a residence near Olympia where he lived with a housekeeper and his granddaughter, Hellen. In 1918, Mitchell moved to Los Angeles, California, to live with his daughter.

During his life, Mitchell was a Democrat, and a communicant of the Baptist Church of Olympia.

William Henry Mitchell died in Los Angeles, California on March 14, 1919.

== See also ==
- Isaac Stevens
- Leschi (Nisqually)
- Great Plains
- Naches Pass
- Yakima War

== Literature cited ==
- De Rego, David, ed. (1914), "A Legacy of Service to the Agricultural Community.", mitchellewis.com, Wilsonville, Oregon: Mitchell, Lewis & Staver Company, OCLC 1017491225
- "CPI Inflation Calculator", Bureau of Labor Statistics, Washington: United States Department of Labor
- Murphy, John Miller, ed. (December 28, 1878), "Olympia landmarks", The Washington Standard, Olympia: McClatchy, p. 4, ISSN 2379-7339, LCCN sn84022770, OCLC 10580261
- Murphy, John Miller, ed. (October 23, 1903), "The new hotel", The Washington Standard, Olympia: McClatchy, p. 3, ISSN 2379-7339, LCCN sn84022770, OCLC 10580261
- Murphy, John Miller, ed. (December 29, 1905), "Death of another pioneer", The Washington Standard, Olympia: McClatchy, p. 3, ISSN 2379-7339, LCCN sn84022770, OCLC 10580261
- "Pioneers are passing away", Spokane Chronicle, Spokane: Cowles Company, p. 2, June 18, 1907, LCCN sn86072020, OCLC 14374699
- Blankenship, Georgiana M. (1914), Early History of Thurston County, Washington: Together with Biographies and Reminiscences of Those Identified with Pioneer Days (PDF), Olympia, LCCN 17012856, OCLC 5692696519
- Himes, George H. (March 31, 1919), Young, Frederic George (ed.), "Death List of Oregon Pioneers January 1-March 31, 1919", The Quarterly of the Oregon Historical Society, 20 (1), Portland: Oregon Historical Society: 139, ISSN 0030-4727, JSTOR 20610126, LCCN 06013601, OCLC 655109220
- Hunt, Herbert; Kaylor, Floyd C. (1917), Washington, west of the Cascades; historical and descriptive; the explorers, the Indians, the pioneers, the modern, Chicago: S. J. Clarke Publishing Company, LCCN 18015511, OCLC 10086413
- Prosser, William Farrand (1903), Lewis, Edward Gardner (ed.), A history of the Puget Sound country, its resources, its commerce and its people, New York City: Edward Gardner Lewis, LCCN 05013767
