= Harlows Creek =

Stream in Wahkiakum County, Washington, U.S.

Coordinates: 46°15′59″N 123°33′08″W

Harlows Creek is a stream in Wahkiakum County in the U.S. state of Washington. The name of the stream used to be Jim Crow Creek until it was changed by the U.S. Board of Geographic Names effective May 10, 2017 as part of an nationwide effort to remove offensive and/or derogatory names from geographic features. The new name commemorates John (1872-1953) and Mary (1888-1963) Harlow, who lived in the area during the 1870s.

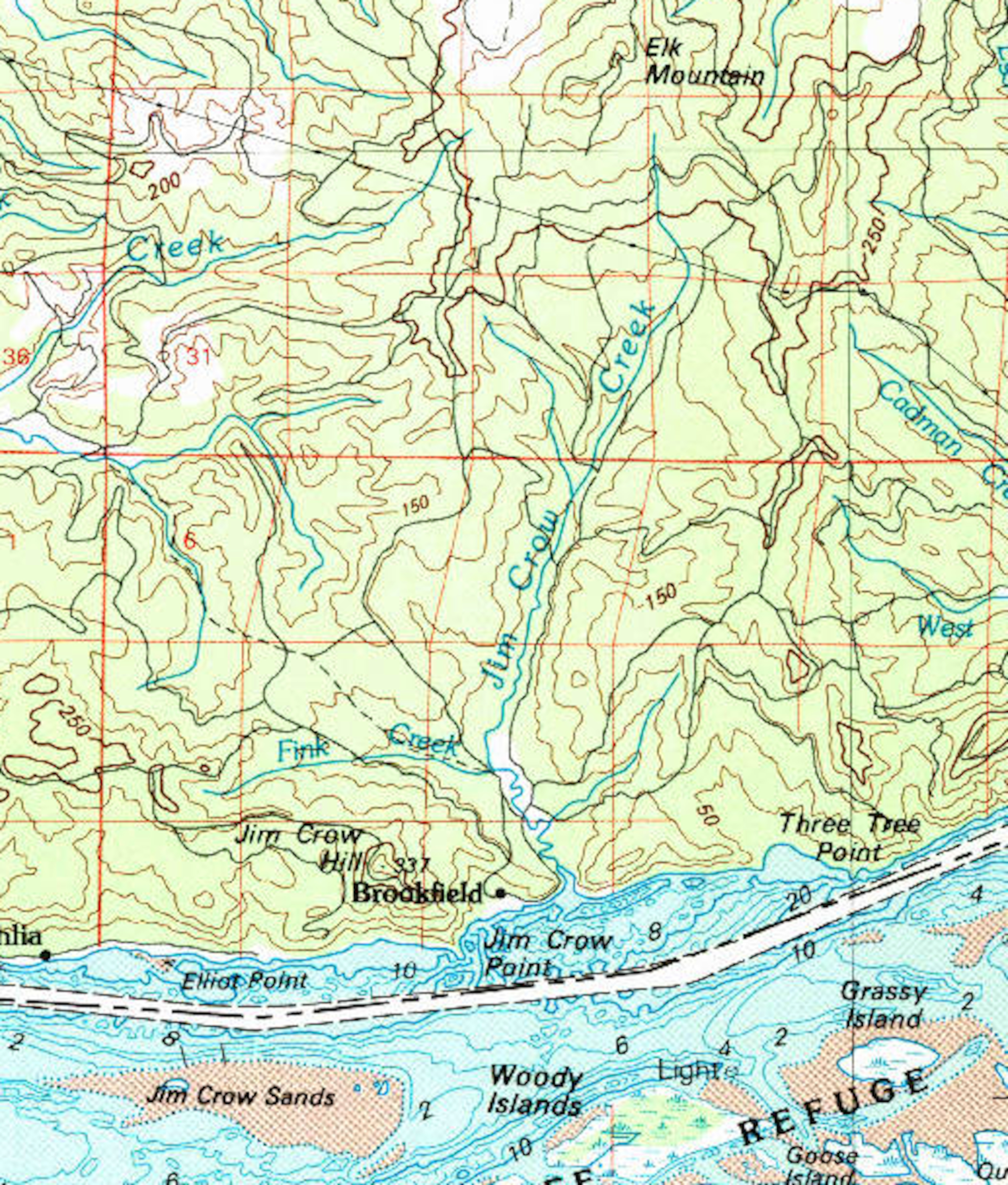
1981 USGS topo map showing Harlows Creek as Jim Crow Creek. Also shows Jim Crow Hill, Jim Crow Point, and Jim Crow Sands.

The origin of the name Jim Crow Creek was a reference to James D. Saules, a free black sailor who travelled widely throughout the Pacific in the 1800s. He was part of the United States Exploring Expedition. After the Cockstock incident along the lower Columbia River four nearby places where named "Jim Crow" due to Saules's involvement: Jim Crow Creek (Harlows Creek), Jim Crow Hill (now Beare Hill), Jim Crow Point (now Brookfield Point), and Jim Crow Sands. The incident also contributed to the Provisional Government of Oregon enacting the Oregon black exclusion laws. All three "Jim Crow" places names in Washington were renamed in 2017 due to the efforts of Washington Senator Pramila Jayapal. Jim Crow Sands, in the Columbia River, is in Oregon and has not been renamed as of 2023.

Harlows Creek originates high on the slopes of Elk Mountain and flows south to the Columbia River, entering the river just east of the historical community of Brookfield, about 13 mi (21 km) east of Astoria, Oregon. Harlows Creek has one named tributary, Fink Creek.

An early 20th century work suggested the point was named for crows that nested there. However, this reference also suggests a tree growing on the point could be seen far out at sea, an idea which should not be taken seriously due to distance as well as geographic features, so the reference itself might have little value.

== See also ==
- List of rivers of Washington (state)
- List of tributaries of the Columbia River
