= USS Shark (1821) =

Former US Navy schooner

Coordinates: 46.2449°N 124.0679°W

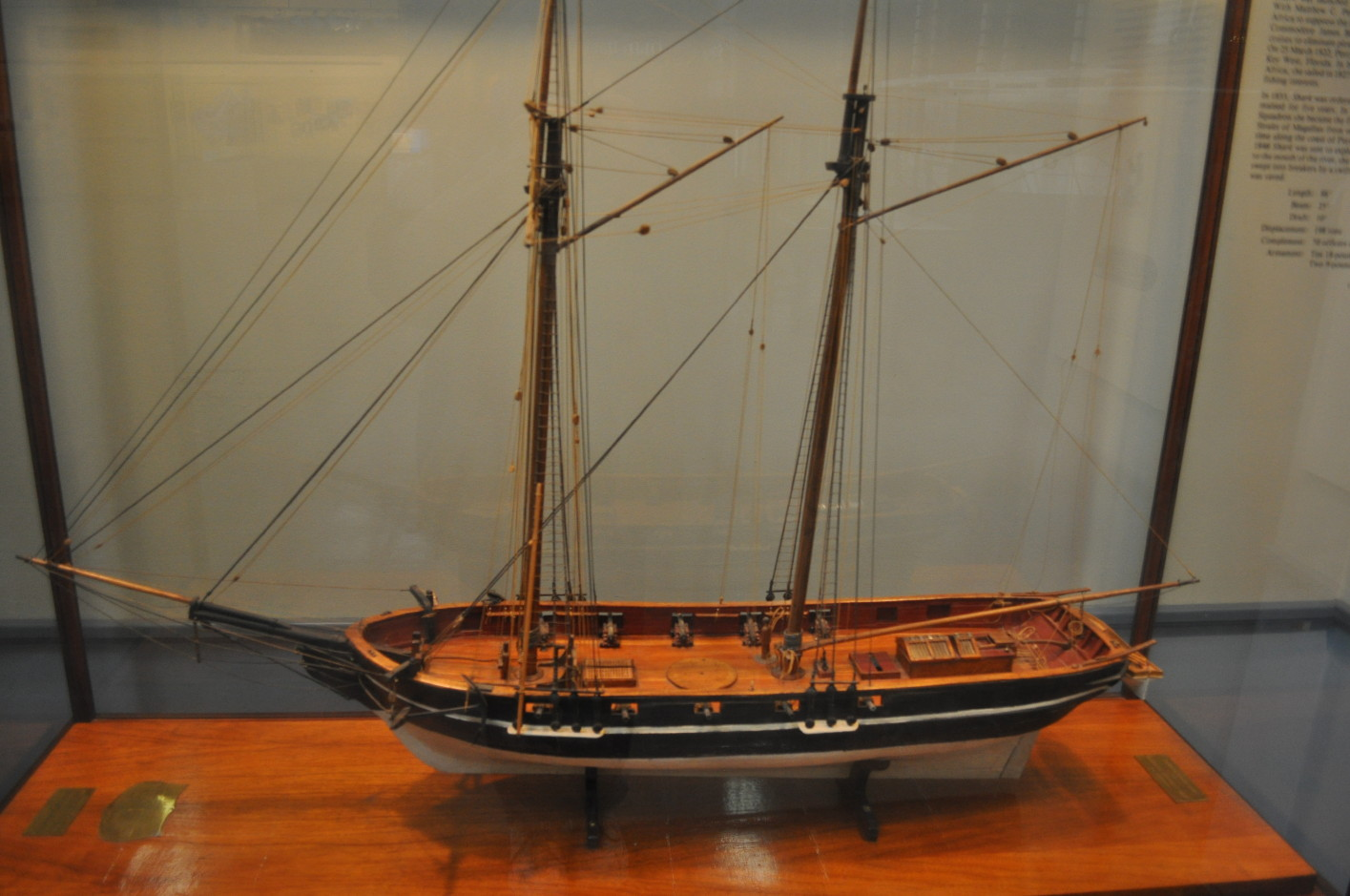
- Model of Shark at the U.S. Navy Museum

History

United States
- Name: USS Shark
- Namesake: Shark
- Builder: Washington Navy Yard
- Cost: $23,627.00 USD in 1821
- Launched: 17 May 1821
- Fate: wrecked 1846

General characteristics
- Displacement: 198 t (195 long tons; 218 short tons)
- Length: 86 ft (26 m)
- Beam: 24 ft 7 in (7.49 m)
- Draft: 10 ft 4 in (3.15 m)
- Speed: 8 kn (15 km/h; 9 mph)
- Complement: 70 officers and men
- Armament: 10 × 18 pdr carronades; 2 × 9 pdr guns

The USS Shark was a schooner in the United States Navy from 1821 until it sank crossing the Columbia Bar in 1846.

== Construction ==
The Shark was built in the Washington Navy Yard to the designs of Henry Steers. It was designed for combating Caribbean piracy. The vessel had an "inclination to lower its bow and dive under when pressed by the wind under full sail." On 11 May 1821, Matthew C. Perry was ordered to take command of Shark. She was launched on 17 May and the ship was ready to receive her crew on 2 June 1821.

== Atlantic anti-slavery activities ==
The Shark sailed from the Washington Navy Yard on 15 July for New York. While there, she received Dr. Eli Ayers, on board for transportation to the west coast of Africa. On 7 August the Shark began her first cruise, with the goals of the suppression of the slave trade and piracy. Sailing by way of the Madeira, Canary, and Cape Verde islands, she landed Dr. Ayers at Sierra Leone in October. The Shark returned by way of the West Indies to New York, arriving on 17 January 1822.

The Shark put to sea from New York on 26 February and joined Commodore James Biddle's squadron for the suppression of piracy and slave trading in the West Indies. On 25 March, Lt. Perry took formal possession of what is now Key West, Florida, in the name of the United States. He called the island Thompson's Island to honor Secretary of the Navy Smith Thompson and named the harbor Port Rodgers to compliment Commodore John Rodgers.

Under orders from Commodore Biddle, the Shark departed Nassau on 14 August for another cruise to the western coast of Africa. On 12 December 1822 she returned to Norfolk, Virginia. The Shark again sailed for the West Indies in February 1823. She was back at New York in early July for repairs. On 5 October, she sailed from New York carrying Commodore John Rodgers and three Navy surgeons to Key West to determine the suitability of the location as a naval base. She debarked Rodgers and his party at Norfolk on 16 November 1823 before resuming her cruise in the West Indies. She returned to New York on 13 May 1824.

After repairs in the New York Navy Yard, the Shark sailed on 5 October 1825. She cruised in the West Indies and the Gulf of Mexico until 29 August 1826, when she arrived at Norfolk. On 28 November she proceeded to the coast of Africa to protect slaves freed from captured slave ships. After seeing that the liberated slaves were safely established in Liberia, she returned by way of the Caribbean and arrived at New York on 5 July 1827.

The busy schooner sailed again on 24 July for a cruise to the Newfoundland fisheries to defend American interests there and returned on 6 October. She then resumed her duty in the West Indies, which included anti-slavery and anti-piracy patrols and periodic voyages to West Africa to check the American settlements there.

== Mediterranean ==
In 1833, the Shark was relieved in the West Indies by the schooner Experiment, and sailed for the Mediterranean, where she remained for the next five years, cruising extensively in order to protect American commerce. She cleared Gibraltar for the United States on 22 January 1838 and sailing by way of the West Indies, arrived at the Norfolk Navy Yard on 24 March.

== Pacific Squadron ==
The Shark put to sea from Hampton Roads on 22 July 1839 for duty with the Pacific Squadron. She was the first United States man-of-war to pass through the Straits of Magellan from east to west, a feat accomplished on 13 December 1839 en route to Callao, Peru. During the next five years, she spent much of her time along the coast of Peru to protect American citizens and property during civil disturbances in that country. The Secretary of the Navy noted in 1841 that "all who witnessed the operations of the Shark were inspired with increased respect for the American flag." She also made infrequent cruises northward to observe conditions in Panama and to receive mail.

On 1 April 1846, Shark was ordered to Honolulu, Hawaii for repairs in preparation for an exploratory voyage up the Columbia River, "to obtain correct information of that country and to cheer our citizens in that region by the presence of the American flag."

On 12 July 1846 the Shark reached the mouth of the Columbia River. In the afternoon Henry H. Spalding, Asa Lovejoy, and William H. Gray arrived on a small boat. While there wasn't a regular pilot for the Columbia, they recommended employing James D. Saules to reach Fort George. He was likely most familiar with scows, the most commonly used vessels on the Columbia by fur traders and settlers. Saules "was also facing one of the world's most difficult rivers to navigate..." Commanding officer Lieutenant Neil M. Howison described the subsequent events:

[Saules] ordered the helm put up, head sheets aft, and yards braced, with an air that deceived me into the belief that he was fully competent to conduct the vessel, and he was put in charge of her. In twenty minutes he ran us hard ashore on Chinook shoal, where we remained several hours thumping severely.

After the USS Shark freed itself from the shoal it awaited Alexander Lattie, the officer in charge of Fort George. The following morning Lattie succeeded in guiding the vessel to his fur trading post. Lattie was dismissed by the Hudson's Bay Company later that year.

== Sinking ==
After several weeks in the vicinity of Fort Vancouver, the vessel returned to the mouth of the Columbia on 8 September. As it was known that the Columbia bar had changed position since the last survey was made by Charles Wilkes, the following day was spent making new observations and other preparations for crossing. Unable to secure another pilot, on 10 September the Shark attempted to exit the Columbia River. Unfortunately, the ship hit another uncharted shoal, was swept into the breakers by a swift tide, and sank. Saules likely witnessed the event, although his reaction isn't preserved in historical documentation.

=== Aftermath ===
The Shark was a total loss, but her entire crew was saved. Upon learning of the vessel's demise, the Royal Navy and Hudson's Bay Company's officers at Fort Vancouver immediately coordinated and dispatched a relief effort, including food, tobacco, and clothing. Lt. Howison soon returned to Fort Vancouver, where he acquired additional supplies and on 16 November chartered the Hudson's Bay Company schooner Cadboro. She reached San Francisco, California on 27 January 1847.

A court of inquiry absolved Lt. Neil M. Howison of all blame for the loss of his ship.

== Artifacts ==
Several artifacts associated with the wrecked schooner are on public display in Oregon. The schooner's capstan and one carronade are on display at the Cannon Beach History Center in Cannon Beach, Oregon. The carronade was discovered four or five miles north of Arch Cape in 1898, and is what gave Cannon Beach its name. On 16 February 2008, two more carronades believed to have belonged to Shark were discovered on the beach near Arch Cape, Oregon.

The newly discovered carronades were restored at the Center for Maritime Archaeology and Conservation at Texas A&M University and are now on display at the Columbia River Maritime Museum in Astoria, Oregon. The Maritime Museum exhibit also features an officer's sword that is believed to have originated on Shark, along with a large rock known as "Shark Rock" that features words and dates believed to be etched on by survivors of the wreck.

== Bibliography ==
=== Articles ===
- Howison, Neil (Mar 1913). "Report of Lieutenant Neil M. Howison on Oregon, 1846: A Reprint". The Quarterly of the Oregon Historical Society. 14 (1). Portland, OR: Oregon Historical Society: 1–66. JSTOR 20609921.
- Shine, Gregory Paynter (2008). "'A Gallant Little Schooner': The U.S. Schooner Shark and the Oregon Country, 1846". Oregon Historical Quarterly. 109 (4). Portland: Oregon Historical Society: 536–565. ISSN 0030-4727.

=== Books ===
- Coleman, Kenneth R. (2017). Dangerous Subjects. Corvallis: Oregon State University Press. ISBN 9780870719042.

=== Newspapers ===
- Crombie, Noelle (2008-02-20). "Pair of cannons found on Oregon Coast could be from 1846 ship". OregonLive.com. The Oregonian. Archived from the original on 2022-01-16.
- Tetlow, Roger T. (1975-03-12). "Black Saul Details". The Daily Astorian. Astoria, OR.
- Tobias, Lori (2014-05-16). "Cannons from USS Shark come back home to Oregon's coast". OregonLive.com. The Oregonian. Archived from the original on 2017-11-15.
