= James D. Saules =

Black sailor and Oregon Country settler

- Occupations: Sailor, Freight Business Owner
- Known for: US Exploring Expedition, first settler of Cape Disappointment, Cockstock Incident

James D. Saules was a sailor of the United States Exploring Expedition. In 1841 he survived the sinking of the USS Peacock at the Columbia Bar. Saules subsequently was among the first black settlers of the Oregon Country. While residing in the Willamette Valley he became involved in the Cockstock incident.

== Early life ==
There is no definite birthplace of Saules. Based on onomastic information and historical accounts, Kenneth R. Coleman, author of a microhistory about Saules, considers North Carolina or Virginia to be probable. 1806 is suggested as his birth year. Regardless if Saules was born into slavery or not, he was free by 1833.

== Maritime career ==
Saules started sailing when he was about 15 years old. Coleman considers the ports of Baltimore, Charleston, Norfolk, and Richmond as potential places where he began. Saules was living in New Bedford when he joined the Winslow, a whaling ship based out of New Haven during 1833. He served as a mate on the vessel, just below the captain. Stockpiles of salt meat on board the Winslow became putrid and scurvy developed among the crew. Nine men from the Winslow deserted on Cocos Island, with Saules likely among them. They were eventually picked up by the Almira, another whaling ship, and were subsequently taken to the port of Paita in Peru.

=== U.S. Exploring Expedition ===
In the aftermath of the War of the Confederation, the Peruvian port city of Callao had many American mercenaries, Saules may have been among them. The United States Exploring Expedition visited the port during July 1839 and hired Saules as a cook for the USS Peacock. Saules' opportunity was rare for black men during the Antebellum of the United States. The job came with relative independence and separation from the crew. He also performed as a musician, either as a fiddler or violinist.

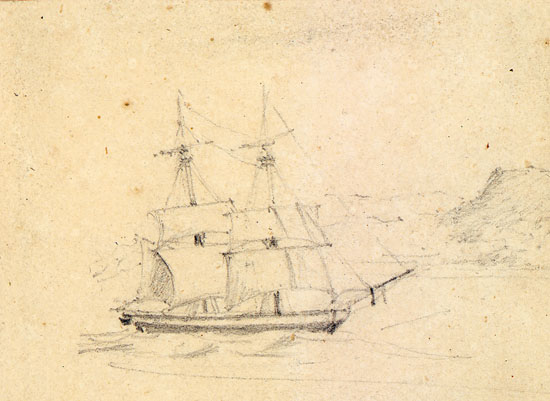
The USS Peacock

Saules served with the U.S. Exploring Expedition from July 1839 until October 1841. During the initial part of his service he visited Tuamotus, Tahiti, and Samoa. On 10 January 1840 the Peacock briefly visited Macquarie Island after leaving Port Jackson. After a perilous encounter with icebergs the vessel returned to Sydney on 21 February for repairs.

On 30 March the Peacock departed the Australian port for Fiji. Once at the Fijian archipelago, in the orders of Lieutenant Charles Wilkes, the Peacock went to Rewa of Viti Levu island. Commander William L. Hudson sought to capture a man named Ro Veidovi, a brother of the reigning Roko Tui Dreketi, Ro Banuve. Ro Veidovi was accused participating in the murder of the crew of the American Charles Daggett on Ono Island in 1836.

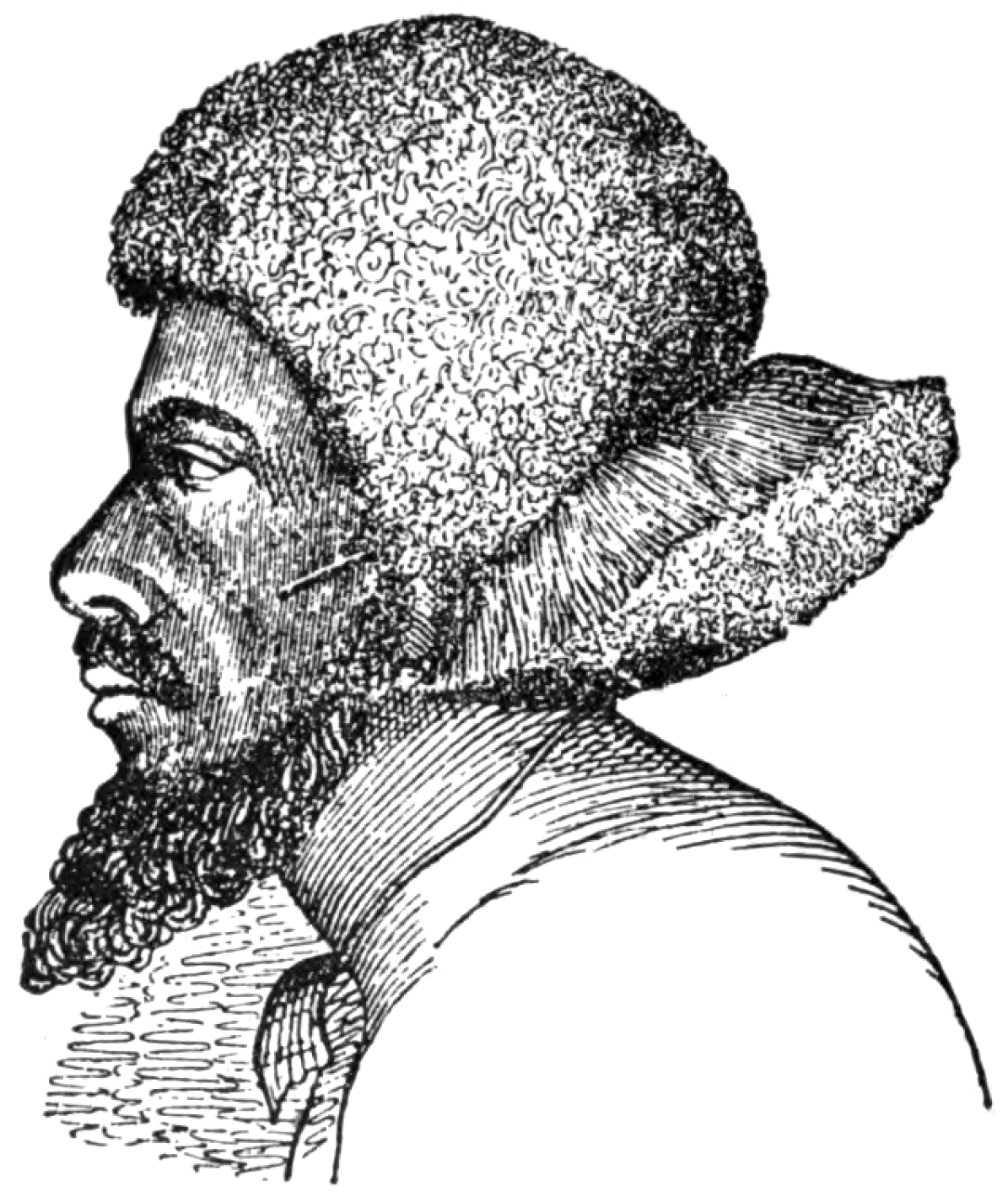
Ro Vendovi.

On 21 May, Ro Banuve along with his family and entourage, were invited onto the Peacock for entertainment. According to William Reynolds a staged ceremony was held for the visiting Fijians, with Saules a part of the ruse:

"[Ro Banuve] was honored with one roll and a half of the drum, instead of three, the black steward of my mess, who flourished the sticks, breaking down in the middle of the second, so that this part of the show terminated in several abortive squeaks of the fife breathed by the Ship’s Cook."

The Fijians were soon informed that the true purpose of their visit was to capture then as hostages. Captain Hudson explained that "meant them no harm, but it was his intention to detain them until Vendovi was brought off." Ro Veidovi surrendered himself the following day. While the American officers promised to not execute him, they insisted on taking Ro Veidovi back to East Coast of the United States. Agreeing to the proposal, Veidovi remained with the U.S. Exploring Expedition until its return to New York City in 1842, where he died from illness.

The U.S. Exploring Expedition departed Fiji in August 1840. En route to the Kingdom of Hawaiʻi, supplies of flour, coffee, tea, and sugar on board the Peacock ran out. Its personnel were served "worm-infested bread, a daily pound of yams per man, and stinking beef that resembled mahogany." Oahu was reached on 30 September. After resupply the Peacock returned to Samoa, as Wilkes had found the previous survey inadequate.

The Peacock went to contemporary Kiribati after leaving Samoa. It visited Manra of the Phoenix Islands on 17 January 1841. After several additional surveys of various atolls, on 3 April the Peacock reached Utiroa. A crewmember went missing after visiting the island. Almost the entire crew with Saules likely among them killed a number of Kiribatians in the Battle of Drummond's Island. The Peacock then sailed for Oahu, going through the Marshall Islands. The vessel reached the Hawaiian port on 14 June and received extensive repairs.

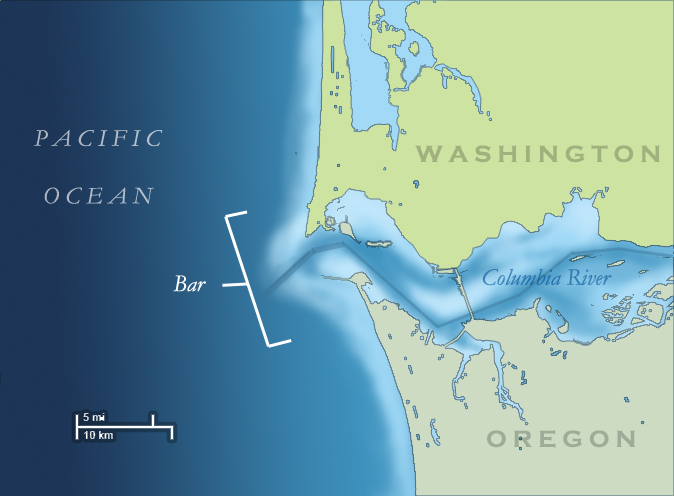
Map of the Columbia Bar.

On 2 December the Peacock departed for the Pacific Northwest. It reached the mouth of the Columbia River on 17 July 1841. In the afternoon of the following day Hudson ordered the Peacock to cross the Columbia Bar. Unfortunately, the Peacock soon hit a shoal and proceeded to be battered by the current. After struggling to keep it afloat throughout the night, the crew was rescued the following morning. The Peacock was soon destroyed thereafter.

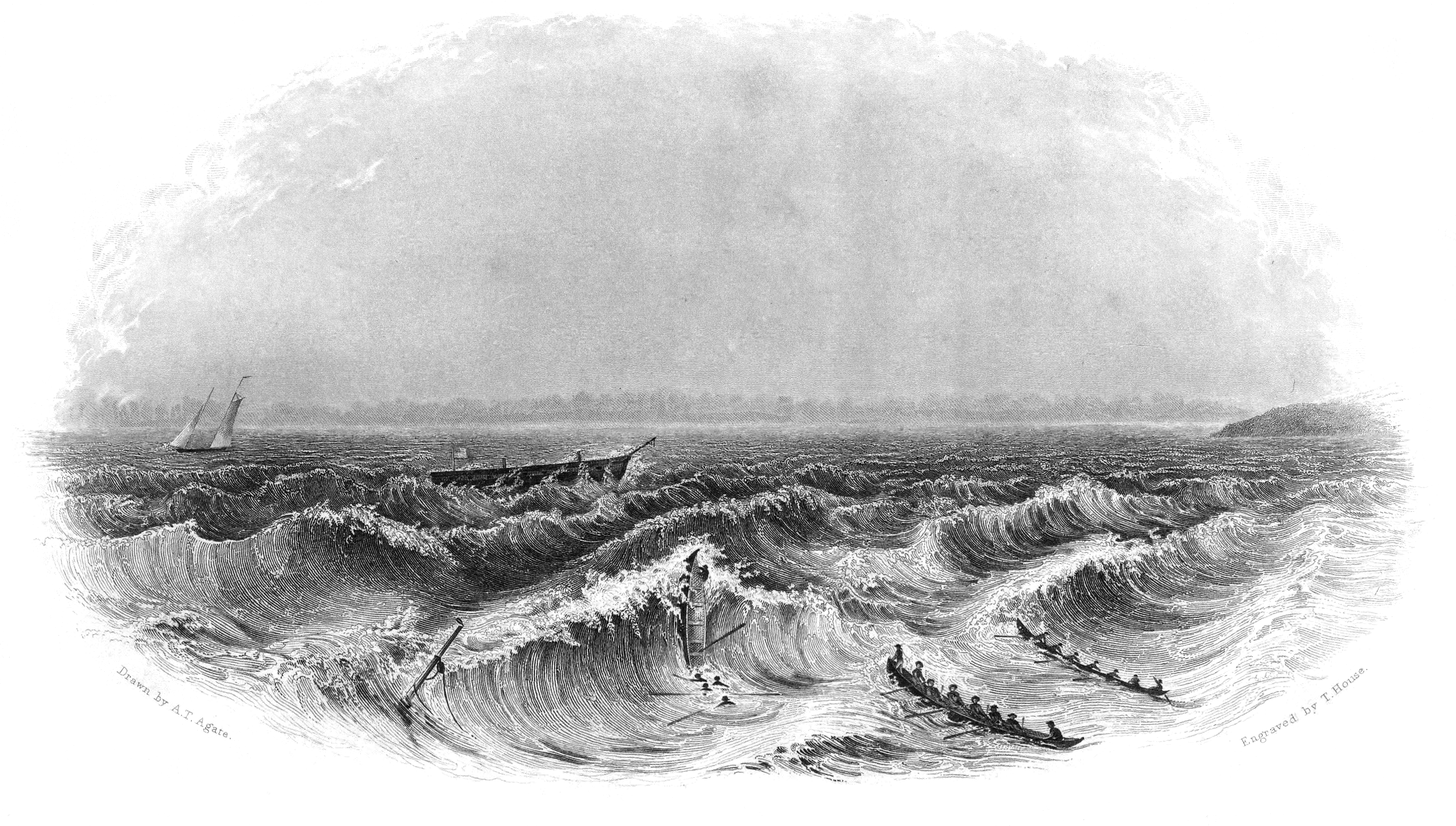
The crew abandoned the USS Peacock.

The beleaguered Peacock crew was given aid by James Birnie and John McLoughlin of the Hudson's Bay Company and Clatsop Mission members Joseph H. Frost and Henry W. Kone. The fur traders and missionaries sent food, clothing, bedding, razors, and other amenities. The crew of the Peacock established residency near the original location of Fort Astoria. Rather than join the replacement USS Oregon, Saules deserted on 1 October 1841. Two other black servicemen, steward Warren Johnson and fellow cook Henry Evans joined Saules in desertion.

== Settler ==
=== Cape Disappointment ===
Saules settled in contemporary Cape Disappointment, Washington state and initially found employment as a maritime pilot. While there he married a Chinookan woman from around contemporary Ilwaco, and probably learned Chinook Jargon.

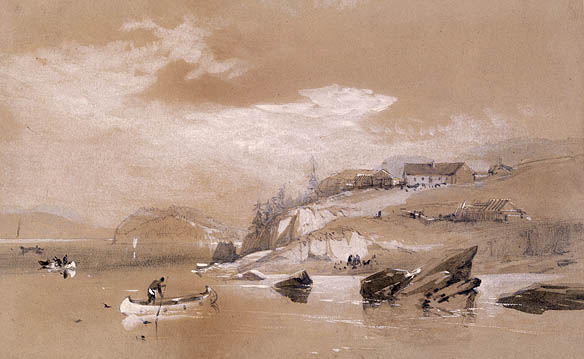
A watercolor painting of Fort George in 1845.

In 1842 Saules began an enterprise shipping supplies between Fort George and Cathlamet. He "threw his lot in with the colonizers" by participating in the transportation of "the goods and services that were crucial for the expansion of Euro-American economic power in the region." Cathlamet was once the largest indigenous settlement of the Lower Columbia River. It had a predominantly mixed Chinookan population of Kathlamet, Chinook, and Wahkiakum peoples alongside some Cowlitz.

=== Willamette Valley ===
Saules and his wife moved near Oregon City in the Willamette Valley. While living there he became embroiled in the Cockstock incident which was to have a profoud impact upon his life. The problem started when another black pioneer, George Winslow, sold Saules a horse previously promised to a Molala man, Cockstock. After learning his horse was gone Cockstock confiscated the horse and made threats towards the two black men. Eventually, in early March 1844, violence between settlers and Cockstock erupted. Ultimately Henderson and Saules killed Cockstock out of defense for Anderson. Sub-Indian agent Elijah White paid off Cockstock's Wasco relatives to ease tensions.

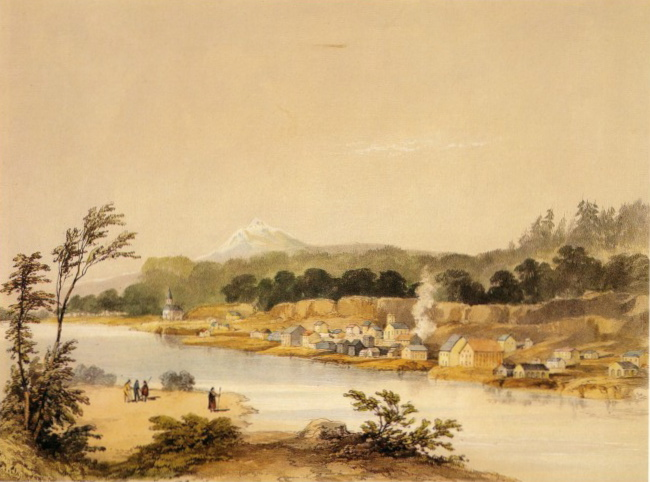
Oregon City in 1845, as depicted by Warre.

Joseph Meek arrested Saules on 1 May 1844 for allegedly threatening to incite his Chinookan wife's relatives against Charles E. Pickette during an argument. Pickette, a "belligerent and eccentric Southerner... was adamantly pro-slavery, and harbored a notorious aversion to physical labor." As the Provisional Government of Oregon denied Saules citizenship it is probable he received no legal representation or a fair trial. In late July 1844 the first black exclusion law was decreed by the Provisional Government. It forbade both black slavery and the residence of any "free negros and mulattos" in Oregon. As the Provisional Government was centered in the Willamette Valley, its authority didn't extend north of the Columbia River.

=== Return to Cape Disappointment ===
Saules was forced back to Cape Disappointment, where he returned to sailing between Cathlamet and Fort George. When fur trader James Birnie relocated his family from Fort George to Cathlamet business activity increased for Saules. Late in 1846 Saules' wife died.

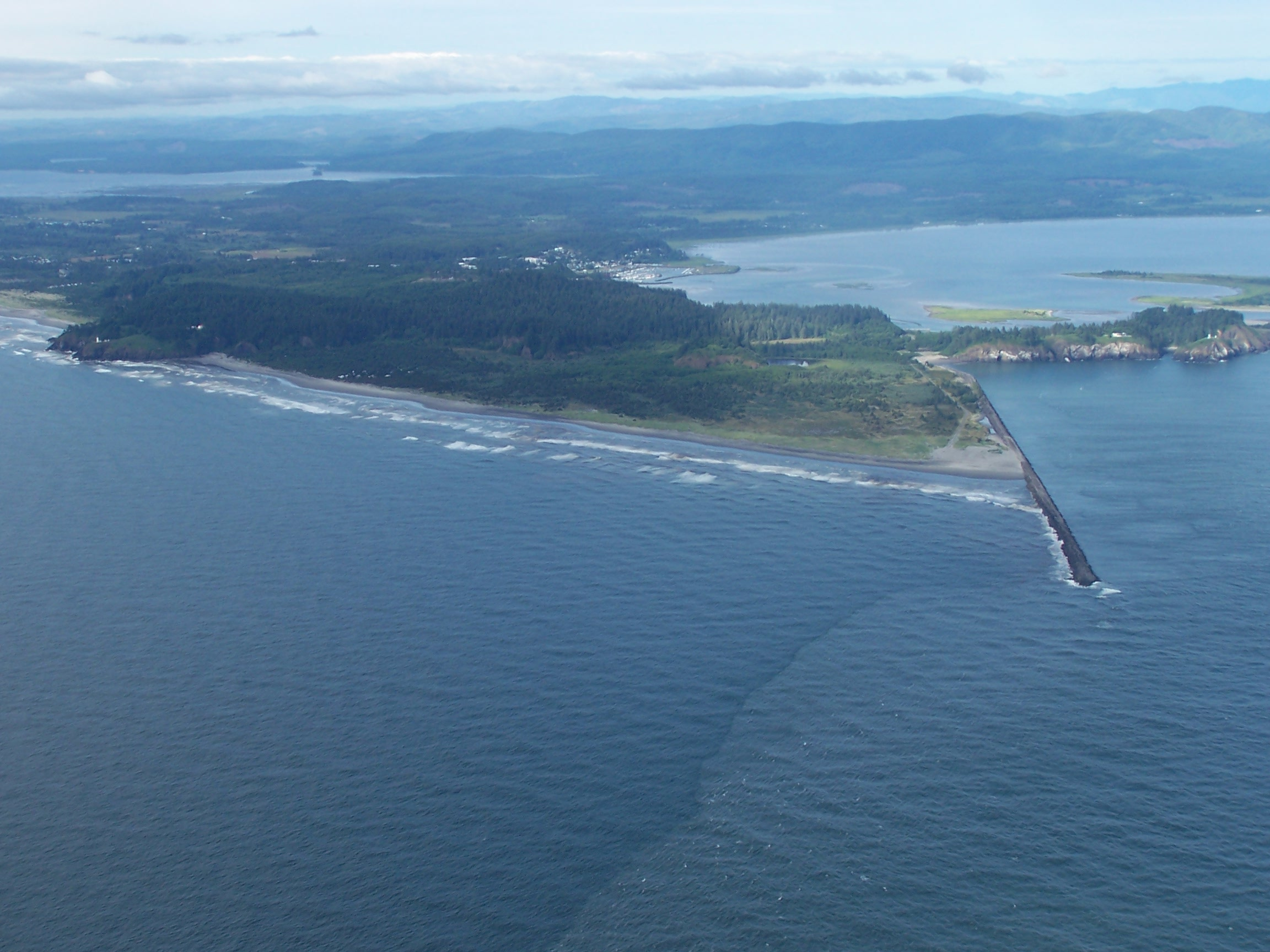
Modern Cape Disappointment

On 12 July 1846 the USS Shark reached the Columbia River. It was designed for combating Caribbean piracy. The vessel had an "inclination to lower its bow and dive under when pressed by the wind under full sail." In the afternoon Henry H. Spalding, Asa Lovejoy, and William H. Gray arrived on a small boat. While there wasn't a regular pilot for the Columbia, they recommended employing Saules to reach Fort George. He was likely most familiar with scows, the most commonly used vessels on the Columbia by fur traders and settlers. Saules "was also facing one of the world's most difficult rivers to navigate..." Commanding officer Lieutenant Neil M. Howison described the subsequent events:

"[Saules] ordered the helm put up, head sheets aft, and yards braced, with an air that deceived me into the belief that he was fully competent to conduct the vessel, and he was put in charge of her. In twenty minutes he ran us hard ashore on Chinook shoal, where we remained several hours thumping severely."

After the USS Shark freed itself from the shoal it awaited Alexander Lattie, the officer in charge of Fort George. The following morning Lattie succeeded in guiding the vessel to his fur trading post. Lattie was dismissed by the Hudson's Bay Company later that year. Unable to secure another pilot, on 10 September the USS Shark attempted to exit the Columbia River but hit another shoal, sinking this time. Saules likely witnessed the event, although his reaction isn't preserved in historical documentation.

In 1848 Saules was captured and publicly flogged by white settlers. An observer of the violence stated "It was a shocking scene to witness" and that "Saul never recovered from his disgrace. His troubles affected his mind, and he became partially insane."

== Later life and legacy ==
The last records of Saules are in early 1850s of Cathlamet store ledgers. He is believed to have died during the time period. Coleman surmised Saules' experiences in Pacific Northwest:

"Saules lived in Oregon at a time when Anglo-Americans conquered the region. These were people who had difficulty imaging that racial difference would not leaf to violent social divisions. For the majority of them, the creation of their ideal community required the marginalization and often the removal of people they marked as nonwhite. Their racialist views compelled them to see black people not as fellow colonizers but as a threat to colonization itself."

== Place-names controversy ==
In 2016 Washington state Senator Pramila Jayapal proposed that 36 place names that contained racial slurs be renamed. In the area around Cape Disappointment were three locations named Jim Crow. Historians consider them references to Saules as he lived in the vicinity. Some consider the place names to have been derived from the birds of the area, a logger, or a native chief. Although Senator Jayapal had suggested naming the three locations after Saules, in the end, they were renamed Beare Hill, Brookfield Point, and Harlows Creek.

== Bibliography ==
=== Articles ===
- Bordwell, Constance (1991). "Delay and Wreck of the Peacock: An Episode in the Wilkes Expedition". Oregon Historical Quarterly. 92 (2). Portland: Oregon Historical Society: 119–198. ISSN 0030-4727. JSTOR 20614379.
- Davis, Lenwood G. (1972). "Sources for History of Blacks in Oregon". Oregon Historical Quarterly. 73 (3). Portland: Oregon Historical Society: 196–211. ISSN 0030-4727. JSTOR 20613303.
- Howison, Neil (Mar 1913). "Report of Lieutenant Neil M. Howison on Oregon, 1846: A Reprint". The Quarterly of the Oregon Historical Society. 14 (1). Portland: Oregon Historical Society: 1–66. JSTOR 20609921.
- Lattie, Alexander (1963). "Alexander Lattie's Fort George Journal, 1846". Oregon Historical Quarterly. 64 (3). Portland: Oregon Historical Society: 197–245. ISSN 0030-4727. JSTOR 20612749.
- McClintock, Thomas C. (1995). "James Saules, Peter Burnett, and the Oregon Black Exclusion Law of June 1844". The Pacific Northwest Quarterly. 86 (3): 121–130. ISSN 0030-8803. JSTOR 40491550.
- Savage, W. Sherman (July 1928). "The Negro in the History of the Pacific Northwest". The Journal of Negro History. 13 (3): 255–264. doi:10.2307/2713979. JSTOR 2713979.
- Shine, Gregory Paynter (2008). "'A Gallant Little Schooner': The U.S. Schooner Shark and the Oregon Country, 1846". Oregon Historical Quarterly. 109 (4). Portland: Oregon Historical Society: 536–565. doi:10.1353/ohq.2008.0012. ISSN 0030-4727. JSTOR 20615903.
- Taylor, Quintard (1982). "Slaves and Free Men: Blacks in the Oregon Country, 1840–1860". Oregon Historical Quarterly. 83. Portland: Oregon Historical Society: 153–169.

=== Books ===
- Coleman, Kenneth R. (2017). Dangerous Subjects. Corvallis: Oregon State University Press. ISBN 9780870719042.
- Grover, La Fayette (1853). The Oregon Archives. Salem: Asahel Bush.
- Hunt, Herbert; Kaylor, Floyd C. (1917). Washington, West of the Cascades: Historical and Descriptive; the Explorers, the Indians, the Pioneers, the Modern. Chicago, Seattle, Tacoma: S. J. Clarke Publishing Company.
- McDonald, Lucile Saunders (1966). Coast country; a history of southwest Washington. Portland: Binfords & Mort – via Internet Archive.
- Reynolds, William (2004-10-26). Philbrick, Nathaniel; Philbrick, Thomas (eds.). The Private Journal of William Reynolds: United States Exploring Expedition, 1838–1842. Penguin Publishing Group. ISBN 978-0-14-303905-1.
- Scammon, C. M. (1875). "Pioneer Nig Saul". Overland Monthly and Out West Magazine. San Francisco, CA: A. Roman and Co. pp. 273–276 – via Google Books.
- Strong, Thomas N. (1906). Cathlamet on the Columbia: recollections of the Indian people and short stories of early pioneer days in the valley of the lower Columbia River. Portland: Binfords & Mort.
- Stanton, William R. (1975). The Great United States Exploring Expedition of 1838–1842. Berkeley and Los Angeles: University of California Press. ISBN 978-0-520-02557-8 – via Internet Archive.
- Wilkes, Charles (1844). Narrative of the United States Exploring Expedition: During the Years 1838, 1839, 1840, 1841, 1842. Vol. 4. Philadelphia: C. Sherman.
- Wilkes, Charles (1849). Narrative of the United States Exploring Expedition: During the Years 1838, 1839, 1840, 1841, 1842. Vol. 3. Philadelphia: C. Sherman.

=== Newspapers ===
- Mataitini, Ro Alipate Doviverata (2009-12-09). "Ro Veidovi-Putting Him in Proper Perspective". Fiji Sun. Archived from the original on 2020-01-26.
- McDonald, Lucile Saunders (1964-11-22). "Cape Disappointment's First Settler". The Seattle Times. pp. 4–5.
- St. John, Natalie (19 April 2016a). "Jim Saules, not Jim Crow". Chinook Observer. Archived from the original on 2019-01-28.
- St. John, Natalie (1 June 2016b). "Brookfield names will replace Jim Crow". The Daily Astorian. Archived from the original on 2023-06-11.
- Tetlow, Roger T. (1975-03-12). "Black Saul Details". The Daily Astorian. Astoria, OR.

=== Theses ===
- Coleman, Kenneth R. (2014). Dangerous Subjects: James D. Saules and the Enforcement of the Color Line in Oregon. Portland: Portland State University.

=== Websites ===
- Coleman, Kenneth R. (2020a). "Cockstock Incident". The Oregon Encyclopedia. Portland: Oregon Historical Society. Archived from the original on 2020-09-28.
- Coleman, Kenneth R. (2020b). "James D. Saules (1806?–1850s)". The Oregon Encyclopedia. Portland: Oregon Historical Society. Archived from the original on 2020-09-26.
- Nemec, Bethany (April 2, 2019). "Exclusion Laws". Historic Oregon City. Oregon City: The End of the Oregon Trail Interpretive Center. Archived from the original on 2020-02-29.
- Nokes, R. Gregory (2013). "Dangerous Subjects". Oregon Humanities.
