= Thomas D. Keizur =

19th Century American Pioneer

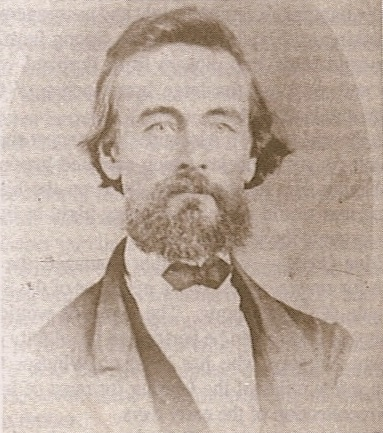
- Oregon pioneer Thomas D. Keizur
- Born: Thomas Dove Keizur; 20 November 1793; Buncombe County, North Carolina
- Died: 19 June 1871 (aged 77); Marion County, Oregon
- Occupation: Farmer
- Known for: Founder of Keizer, Oregon

Thomas Dove Keizur (his name is incorrectly spelled Keizer, Keiser, Kaizur, Kaiser, Keysur, Keyser, Kizer, or Kisor in various documents) was one of the earliest American pioneers to settle in the Oregon Country. In 1843, he led his large family from Missouri to Oregon over the Oregon Trail. He homesteaded in Oregon's Willamette Valley in an area north of modern-day Salem, Oregon. Keizur was one of eight citizens elected to serve on Oregon's third pre-provisional legislative committee which helped lay the foundation for the establishment of the Oregon Territory. He was also the first captain of the Oregon Rangers, the first militia unit organized in Oregon. Today, the city of Keizer, Oregon, is named in his honor.

== Early life ==
Keizur was born on 20 November 1793 in Buncombe County, North Carolina. His parents were George A. and Mary (Dove) Keisur. Keizur married Mary Girley in 1812. Together, they had ten children, five boys and five girls.

In 1828, the Keizurs moved from North Carolina to Giles County, Tennessee. Five years later, he moved further west to Van Buren County, Arkansas.

In 1842, the Keizur family traveled to Missouri hoping to join an emigrant wagon train bound for the Oregon County. However, they arrived too late to start crossing the continent with that year's migration. As a result, the family spent a year in Missouri waiting for the 1843 wagon train to form up.

== Oregon Trail ==
Keizur and his family left Independence, Missouri, for Oregon on 20 May 1843. On the journey to Oregon, Keisur was joined by his wife, five sons, five daughters, two sons-in-law, eight grandchildren, and a brother of one of his sons-in-law.

There were over one hundred wagons and approximately 900 pioneers traveling west to Oregon in 1843. In addition, the pioneers brought a herd of 5,000 cattle that followed as the wagons moved along the trail. The trek was guided by Marcus Whitman, who was returning to his mission station on the Columbia River. To prevent over grazing along the route the pioneers divided into smaller traveling groups. The Keizurs joined what became known as the Applegate party, which traveled slowly with the cattle herd. Along the trail, Keiser became an active leader among the emigrants.

The Keizurs covered over 2,000-mile (3,200 km) on the Oregon Trail. First, their wagon train followed the Platte River and then headed north to Fort Laramie in Wyoming. From there, they followed the North Platte River and the Sweetwater River before crossing the continental divide at South Pass in central Wyoming. Once on the west side of the continental divide, the wagon train headed for Fort Bridger and then turned north to Fort Hall. From there, the party followed the Snake River and then the Columbia River to the Willamette Valley. It took six months for the Keizurs and their fellow emigrants to cross the continent.

== Oregon pioneer ==
The Keizur family arrived in the Willamette Valley in mid-November. They spent the winter in temporary quarters on the west bank of the Willamette River across from the Methodist mission station at Mill Creek which had been established by Jason Lee. In the spring of 1844, the family re-crossed the river and established a number claims on the west bank. The Keizur family land claims were north of the mission. In total, the adult members of the Keizur family claimed 2,725-acre (1,103 ha) of farm land along the Willamette River.

Thomas Keizur himself claimed 608-acre (246 ha). He filed his claim under the provisional government's original land act. His property was bordered on the west by the Willamette River. To the north his land ended at Cummings Lane, a road that was built by the Keizur family. The eastern boundary was River Road and then Cherry Avenue heading south to what is today Salem Industrial Drive. The southern boundary ran from the junction of Cherry Avenue and Salem Industrial Drive west to the river. After Oregon became a United States territory, Keizur refiled his claim in accordance with the Donation Land Claim Act of 1850.

In 1844, Keizur was one of eight citizens elected to the Oregon Country's third provisional legislative committee. He was one of the three representatives from the Champoeg district. This was the first legislative body in the Oregon Country selected in a regular election. Members of the two previous legislative committees were selected at open public meetings. The committee met twice. Both sessions were held in Oregon City. The first meeting was at the home of Felix Hathaway from 18 to 27 June 1844. The second meeting took place at the home of Doctor John E. Long from 16 to 21 December the same year. These meetings helped lay the foundation for the establishment of the Oregon Territory.

In 1844 the Cockstock incident led to several deaths at Willamette Falls near Oregon City. After the deaths, a citizens committee of Willamette Valley residents met on 9 March 1844 to discuss forming a militia. The committee was chaired by W. H. Wilson with Keizur serving as the meeting secretary. The committee approved formation of a mounted rifle company to protect settlers. As a result, a militia company of 25 men, known as the Oregon Rangers, was organized. Keizur was elected captain of the company. Keizur was duly commissioned by the executive committee of Oregon's provisional government. This was the first military unit authorized and formed in the Oregon Country. The company met several times for training, but was not called into action.

In 1846, a special citizens meeting was held at the farm of Daniel Waldo to discuss the need for a militia company. Keizur was elected chairman of the meeting. Attendees voted reestablish the Oregon Rangers mounted rifle company. Charles Bennett was appointed captain of the company. After the meeting, 45 attendees volunteered to serve in the company. Keizur signed the meeting minute which were published in the Oregon Spectator newspaper.

During the 1851–1852 session of the Oregon Territorial Legislature Keizur and two other citizen were appointed to a commission tasked with determining the route of a territorial road between Lafayette in Yamhill County to Salem in Marion County. It appears that Keizur was unable to participate in the commission since records show that another citizen ended up serving in his place. When the proposed route was finally announced in 1853, Keizur and other Marion County residents signed a petition against building the road along the proposed route. As a result of the protest, the road was not built.

Keizur's wife, Mary, died in 1853. Keizur died on 19 June 1871 in Marion County, Oregon. He was 78 years old at the time of his death.

== Legacy ==
Keizur's service in the 1844 pre-territorial legislature helped lay the groundwork for Oregon's territorial government and eventual statehood. When he was elected captain of the Oregon Rangers, he became the state's first militia commander and thus the founding leader of what is today the Oregon National Guard.

The Keiser post office was established in 1948, as a Salem delivery station. On 2 November 1982, the city of Keizer was incorporated and named in honor of Thomas D. Keizur. At the time, the city's population was 19,650. The city continues to grow. As of 2016, the estimated population of Keizer was 38,980.

In 2010, a large bronze statue of Keizur on horseback was installed at the Keizer Civic Center. The statue honors Keizur for his service in pre-territorial legislature and as commander of the state's first military organization. It also recognized him as the founding father of the city of Keizer.

Keizur's last name is spelled incorrectly in various military documents, land deeds, state records, history books, and newspaper articles. Researchers have found 15 different spelling including Keizer, Keiser, Kaizur, Kaiser, Keysur, Keyser, Kizer, and Kisor. However, the correct spelling is Kiser according to various court documents relating to his father, George Kiser.
