= Cockstock incident =

Altercation in the Willamette Valley (1844)

The Cockstock incident was an altercation between Indigenous peoples and settlers in the Willamette Valley. It originated as a dispute between Cockstock, a Native, and James D. Saules, a free Black settler. On 4 March 1844, conflict erupted between Cockstock's party and settlers; with Cockstock and two white settlers dying. The event has been called "the most significant occurrence of violence" in the Oregon Country between indigenous peoples and settlers prior to the Cayuse War.

In the aftermath of the violence, white settlers feared that Black settlers could insult local Indigenous peoples enough to provoke an uprising. The Cockstock incident influenced the adoption an 1844 black exclusion law that banned black settlers from living in the Oregon Country. Historian Thomas McClintock has written that the connection between the Cockstock incident and the Exclusion Law is "unquestionable".

== Background ==
Cockstock was a Molala man who lived in the Oregon Country during the first half of the 19th century. A relative of his had been flogged by Indian agent Elijah White after breaking into the Wascopam Mission home of missionary Henry K. W. Perkins. This incident frustrated Cockstock. He began to advocate against Elijah White's laws on matters of criminal justice and land ownership being imposed on indigenous societies.

In 1843 Cockstock was employed on Winslow Anderson's farm, a free black settler. A horse was promised as payment for Cockstock's labor. By the end of his contract, however, Anderson had sold the horse to another black settler, James D. Saules. This angered Cockstock, who took the horse and issued threats to both men.

On 17 February 1844, White received a letter from Saules. He wrote that he feared for his life and claimed that Cockstock harassed settlers and had "murdered several Indians lately". The following day, White and a small party of settlers attempted to find Cockstock in the vicinity of the Willamette Falls, but he evaded capture. In consequence, White issued a $100 warrant for his arrest.

Archbishop François N. Blanchet recorded an alternative account told by natives, which stated there was one murder. The victim was a baptized Klickitat man who resided on the Clackamas River. He had mistreated and abused two native slaves, who eventually killed their tormentor. Afterwards the slaves escaped back to their homeland.

== Incident ==
On 4 March 1844, Cockstock returned to Oregon City with several men. He inquired why the settlers had been attempting to capture him. A crowd of settlers started to form. Watching the development, an employee of John McLoughlin reportedly exclaimed "That Indian is a good man, you should not molest him; if you do, you will repent!"

The attempt to capture Cockstock was led by Oregon legislature official George LeBreton. Some of the assembled settlers wanted to "shoot him [Cockstock] at any risk". In the ensuing skirmish, Anderson killed Cockstock by smashing his rifle into the native's skull. Two white settlers, LeBreton and Sterling Rogers, were killed from injuries sustained in the fight.

== Aftermath ==
Three days after the conflict, Rev. Modeste Demers described the sentiment of the Willamette Valley settlers to then Vicar general Blanchet:

The settlers seem to acknowledge they have been too quick, in this unfortunate affair; but the unlucky deed is over; it is a true murder; based upon the extremely rash and unjustifiable action of poor Le Breton who will pay dear for his apostasy and crime.

Many white settlers feared retaliation and the Oregon Rangers was organized on 23 March 1844 in response. The widow of Cockstock was Wasco and her relatives were angry at his death. They argued that he had not gone to Oregon City with violent intent. Over 70 Wascos arrived and demanded compensation. Peace between the settlers and natives was maintained by White, who offering payment of "two blankets, a dress, and [a] handkerchief" to the widow.

On 1 May 1844, White wrote to United States Secretary of War James Madison Porter, citing the Cockstock incident and mentioned Saules:

[Saules] remains in that vicinity with his Indian wife and family, conducting [behaving], as yet, in a quiet manner, but doubtless ought to be transported, together with every other negro, being in our condition dangerous subjects. Until we have some further means of protection their immigration ought to be prohibited. Can this be done?

=== 1844 exclusion law ===
In late July 1844 Peter Burnett introduced a statute for the "prevention of slavery in Oregon" in the Legislature of the Provisional Government of Oregon. It forbade both black slavery and the residence of any "free negros and mulattos" in Oregon. Any blacks refusing to leave Oregon were to receive a number of lashes and forcible deportation. The bill was adopted by the legislature, although an amendment was passed in December that removed the physical punishment. Instead, blacks were to be forced back into bondage to work for white settlers, before eventually being deported east to the United States. As the Provisional Government was centered in the Willamette Valley, its authority didn't extend north of the Columbia River. Black and mixed-race people like Saules and George Bush consequently settled in modern Washington state.

== Bibliography ==
=== Articles ===
- Davis, Lenwood G. (1972). "Sources for History of Blacks in Oregon". Oregon Historical Quarterly. 73 (3). Portland: Oregon Historical Society: 196–211. ISSN 0030-4727. JSTOR 20613303.
- McClintock, Thomas C. (1995). "James Saules, Peter Burnett, and the Oregon Black Exclusion Law of June 1844". The Pacific Northwest Quarterly. 86 (3): 121–130. ISSN 0030-8803. JSTOR 40491550.
- Taylor, Quintard (1982). "Slaves and Free Men: Blacks in the Oregon Country, 1840–1860". Oregon Historical Quarterly. 83 (2): 153–170. ISSN 0030-4727. JSTOR 20613841.

=== Books ===
- Allen, A. J. (1848). Ten Years in Oregon. Ithaca, NY: Mack, Andrus, & Co. pp. 230–237.
- Blanchet, François N. (1878). Historical Sketches of the Catholic Church in Oregon During the Past Forty Years. Portland – via Google Books.
- Brown, J. Henry (1892). Brown's Political History of Oregon: Provisional Government. Portland: Wiley B. Allen. LCCN rc01000356. OCLC 422191413. Archived from the original on 2015-04-13 – via Google Books.
- Carey, Charles Henry (1922). History of Oregon (University of Virginia Digitization ed.). Pioneer Historical Publishing Company.
- Grover, La Fayette (1853). The Oregon Archives. Salem: Asahel Bush.
- Ruby, Robert H.; Brown, John A. Jr. (1988). Indians of the Pacific Northwest: A History (1st ed.). Norman: University of Oklahoma Press. ISBN 9780806121130.

=== Newspapers ===
- Hendricks, R. J., ed. (1929-12-31). "Bits for Breakfast". Statesman Journal. Salem. p. 4.
- Jackson, Sam, ed. (1920-11-11). "Olden Oregon". The Oregon Daily Journal. Vol. 19, no. 211. Portland. p. 10.
- Lockley, Fred (1914-10-09). Jackson, Sam (ed.). "In Earlier Days". The Oregon Daily Journal. Vol. 13, no. 181. Portland. p. 6.

=== Websites ===
- Coleman, Kenneth R. (2020). "Cockstock Incident". The Oregon Encyclopedia. Oregon Historical Society. Archived from the original on 2020-09-28.
- Jette, Melinda (2004). "The Cockstock Incident". The Oregon History Project. Oregon Historical Society. Archived from the original on 2021-03-07.
- Nokes, R. Gregory (2013). "Dangerous Subjects". Oregon Humanities.
