= Frederic George Young =

American educator (1858–1929)

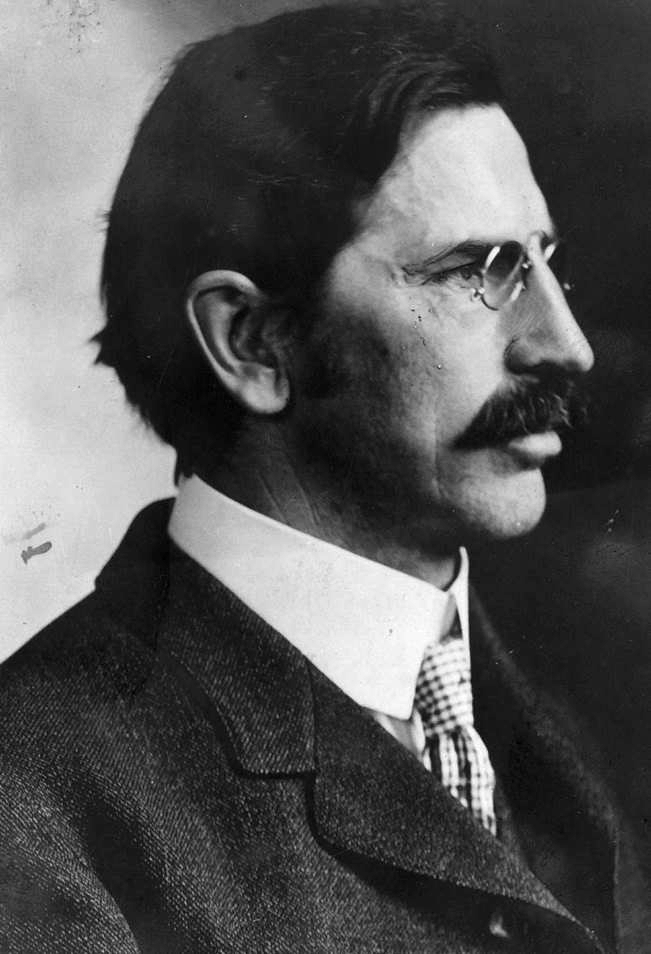
Frederic G. Young, circa 1900

Frederic George Young (sometimes spelled Frederick) (1858–1929) was an educator in the U.S. state of Oregon. He was born in Burnett, Wisconsin on June 3, 1858, and after graduating from Johns Hopkins University in 1886, he taught in Wisconsin and South Dakota. He moved to Portland in 1890, and served as principal at its high school and as president of Albany College before being appointed professor of economics and history at the University of Oregon in 1895. He was a founding officer of the Oregon Historical Society in 1898, and served as editor of its Oregon Historical Quarterly from its founding in 1900 through the December 1928 issue. He served on the Oregon Commission for the Lewis and Clark Centennial Exposition. He was dean of Oregon's School of Sociology from 1919 until his death.
