= Charles H. Bennett (soldier) =

American pioneer

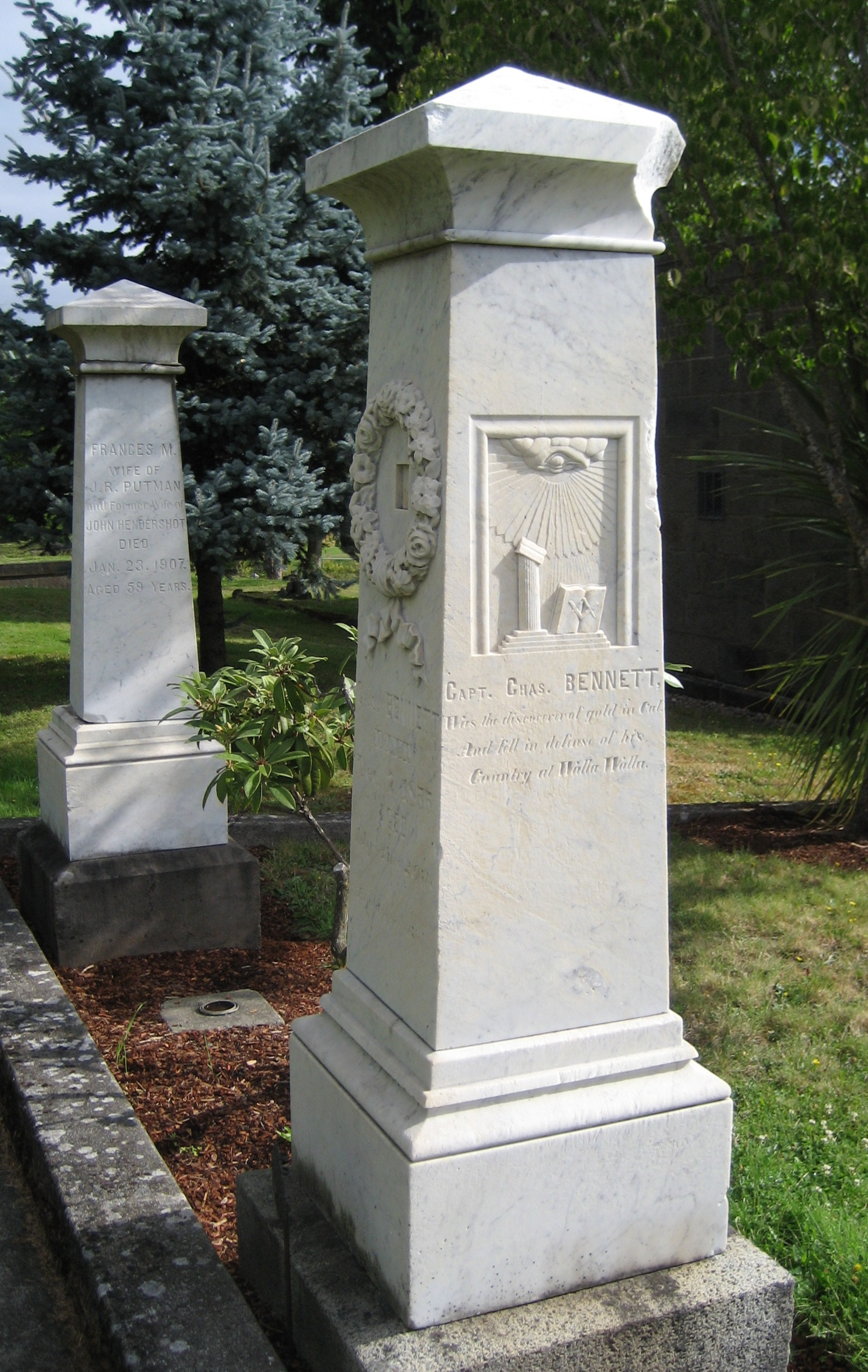
- Charles H. Bennett gravemarker at the Salem Pioneer Cemetery
- Born: August 18, 1811
- Died: December 7, 1855 (aged 44); Walla Walla, Washington
- Military career
- Allegiance: United States of America
- Branch: United States Army
- Service years: 1835-1844, 1855
- Rank: Sergeant, Captain
- Unit: Company A United States Regiment of Dragoons
- Commands: Oregon Rangers; Company F, Oregon Mounted Volunteers
- Conflicts: Yakima War

Charles H. Bennett (18 August 1811 – 7 December 1855) was an American soldier and hotelier who was present at the discovery of gold that initiated the California Gold Rush in January 1848. He served in the United States Army and was captain of a militia unit of the Provisional Government of Oregon. In later years he operated a hotel in the Oregon Territory before dying in the American Indian Wars as a captain of a cavalry unit.

== American West ==
In 1835 Bennett was a Sergeant in Company A, United States Regiment of Dragoons, at Fort Leavenworth, under General Stephen W. Kearny. He moved to Oregon from Fort Leavenworth in 1844. In May 1846 he was involved with forming the Oregon Rangers mounted rifle company, where he was selected as the captain of the group.

In 1847, he went from Oregon Country to California where he was then employed by James Marshall as a carpenter at Sutter's Mill when gold was discovered. Marshall claimed that at the time that he discovered gold in the mill's tail-race, Bennett was half a mile away at the house. This version of events is disputed by Stephen Staats, a lifelong acquaintance who was with him at the time, and later wrote a letter to the Oregon Statesman, stating: "In 1847 we furnished Bennett with an outfit and he traveled with us to California. He assisted Marshall in building a mill on the American fork of the Sacramento, and he was the first one that beheld the glittering dust when water was turned into the race for the purpose of clearing it out. Notwithstanding that Marshall has gained worldwide fame as the first discoverer of gold in California..."

In 1850 Bennett built the Bennett House hotel in Salem, Oregon. He extended the property by building a High Street frontage to the eastern side in 1852 and it became the town's principal hotel. In the winter of 1852–1853, nearly the entire territorial legislature was quartered there, including Judge Matthew Deady, Hon. Asahel Bush, Joseph Meek, Colonel George K. Shiel, James W. Nesmith, Delazon Smith, James K. Kelly, Benjamin Harding, John Whiteaker, Nathaniel Ford of Polk county, and George Law Curry. In 1854, the U. S. Surveyor General's office for Oregon was removed to Salem, and occupied rooms at the Bennett House for some time.

== Steamboat activity ==
Bennett was one of several shareholders who built the steamship Canemah. Bennett was the captain of the sternwheeler Wallemet in April 1854, when the boiler of the steamer Gazelle exploded while both boats were lying at Canemah, Oregon.

== Marriage ==
Bennett was married to Mary Ann Shannon.

== Death ==
Promoted to the captaincy of Company F, Oregon Mounted Volunteers, Bennett was killed in action at Walla Walla on the Touchet River in southeastern Washington, near Fort Wallula, in 1855 during the Yakima War. His body was brought back to Salem aboard the Canemah. It was met by a salute fired by the town's citizens before being buried in the Odd Fellows cemetery with Masonic honors.

His memorial is a white marble obelisk, 6 feet in height with a square pointed cap, a Masonic carving of the All-seeing eye gazing upon an open book. The inscription reads "Capt. Charles Bennett. Died Dec 7 1855. Aged 41 yrs, 3 mo, 20 days. Capt. Chas. Bennett was the discoverer of gold in California, and fell in defense of his country at Walla Walla."
