= Oregon black exclusion laws =

Racist law attempt of Oregon

The Oregon black exclusion laws were a series of measures enacted in the 19th century to prevent black people from settling within the borders of the settlement and eventual U.S. state of Oregon. The first such law took effect in 1844, when the Provisional Government of Oregon voted to exclude black settlers from Oregon's borders. The law authorized a punishment for any Black settler remaining in the territory to be whipped with "not less than twenty nor more than thirty-nine stripes" for every six months they remained. Although the 1844 law authorized whipping as a penalty for Black residents who remained in Oregon beyond the prescribed period, there are no documented cases of anyone being whipped under the law. The whipping provision was replaced later in 1844, before the prescribed removal periods had resulted in its enforcement.

Additional laws aimed at African Americans entering Oregon were ratified in 1849 and 1857. The last of these laws was repealed in 1926. The laws, born of anti-slavery and anti-black beliefs, were often justified as a reaction to fears of black people instigating Native American uprisings.

== Timeline ==
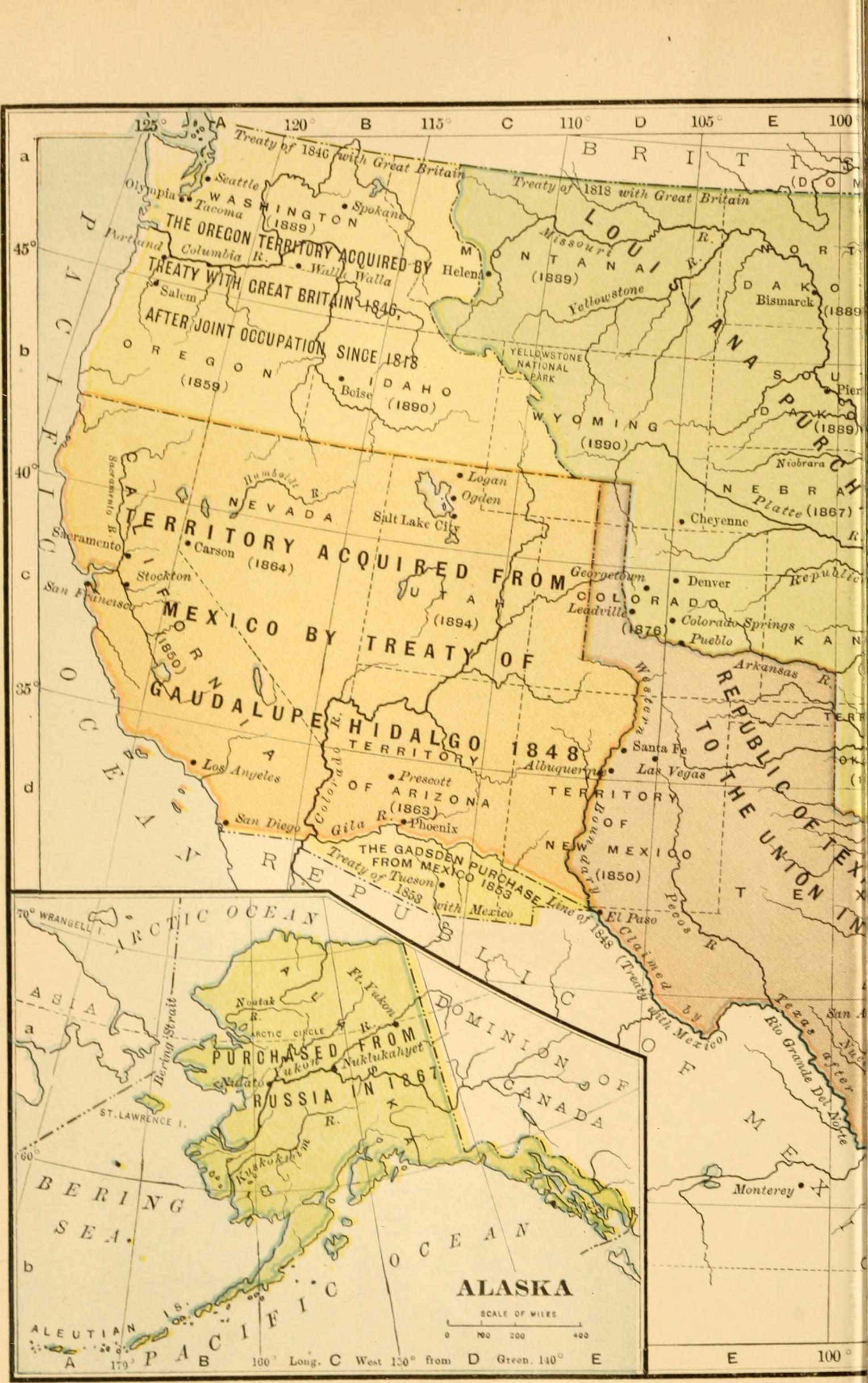
A 1903 map of Oregon Territory

Early white settlers in the Oregon Country often held both anti-slavery and anti-black beliefs, and many came from states, such as Missouri, which had some version of exclusion laws. White settlers believed banning slavery would eliminate political controversy, but feared that settlements of freed slaves would compete for power with white people. One early migrant wrote that Oregon pioneers "hated slavery, but a much larger number of them hated free negroes worse even than slaves".

In 1843, the Provisional Government of Oregon established a set of organic laws, including a ban on slavery: "There shall be neither slavery nor involuntary servitude in the said territory otherwise than in the punishment of crimes whereof the party shall have been duly convicted." Enforcement of the law was left unclear. After a vote on June 26, 1844, the first black exclusion law reiterated a ban on all slavery in Oregon territory, and it forced black and mulatto settlers to leave Oregon territory within three years (two years for men) or be whipped "no more than 39 times". That section was amended in December 1844 to permit a free slave to be resold on the condition that the slave owner agree to remove them from the territory at the end of the contract, which was held with the provisional government. In effect, that re-established slavery on a temporary basis for three years. The law was repealed in 1845 without any such punishment ever being carried out.

In 1857, delegates to Oregon's constitutional convention submitted an exclusion clause to voters, as well as a proposal to legalize slavery. Voters within Oregon ended up rejecting the slavery, but it was approved by the exclusion clause which was originated and imported within the Bill of Rights within the new state's constitution. Oregon then became the only free state admitted within the Union.

On September 21, 1849, the Territorial Legislature established its second exclusion law, declaring a ban on "any negro or mulatto to enter into, or reside" in Oregon unless already established there. At least four black people were punished under this law, including Jacob Vanderpool, a sailor, and three others who were eventually permitted to stay. This specific law was justified by claims that Black people may "intermix with Indians, instilling into their minds feeling of hostility toward the white race. This specific law was rescinded in 1854.

An 1850 census showed fewer than 50 black residents in the state of Oregon, including a mixed-race man from Pennsylvania, George Bush, who was forced to move North of the Columbia River after the first exclusion Law was passed.

On April 16, 1852, Robin Holmes, a black slave of Nathaniel Ford, brought a case to the territorial Supreme Court, charging that he and his family were being held by Ford illegally. Holmes v. Ford was heard by four judges, culminating in Judge George Henry Williams' June 1853 ruling that slavery was illegal in Oregon. Descendants of Holmes have since stated that Ford had encouraged the lawsuit as a means to bring an end to slavery in the state.

On November 7, 1857, Oregon's delegates to the state Constitutional Convention submitted proposals to legalize slavery and to ban black people from the state, including a ban on signing contracts or owning land. The slavery amendment failed, but the exclusion law passed. Oregon was the only state admitted to the Union with such an exclusion law. There are no records that this law was enforced, and the legislature voted down a proposed 1865 law that would authorize sheriffs to deport black residents in their counties.

== 1844 law and amendments ==
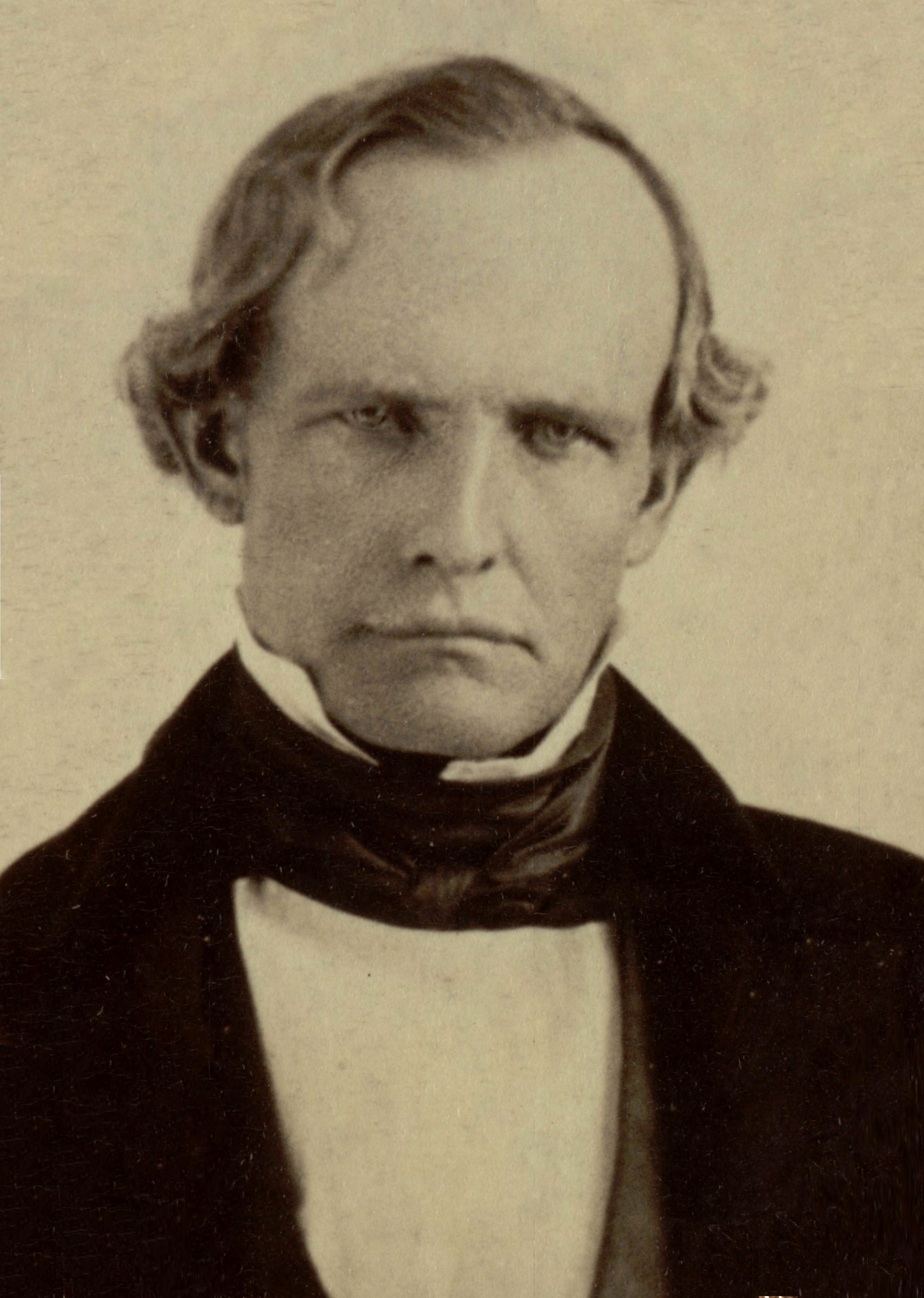
Peter Hardeman Burnett circa 1860

The Cockstock incident was a major factor in the passage of the first black exclusion law. It centered on a fight between a Molala man, Cockstock, and a free black man, James D. Saules, over ownership of a horse. The argument escalated into a melee that killed three men, and led to rhetoric among white settlers that African Americans could create an uprising among local Native American tribes against settlers.

On June 24, 1844, within days of the Cockstock incident, the Oregon Provisional Legislature suspended its rules to allow Peter Burnett to propose a bill "for the prevention of slavery" without reference to a committee. The bill was read twice and voted into law the following day. The bill contained methods of enforcement for the prevention of slavery, which had already been banned in the territory. These laws included a three-year limit on all free black people, and required freed slaves to leave the state within two years, if male, and three years, if female. The initial law proposed "no more than 20" lashings by whip for slaves found in violation of the law, which was amended in December 1844. A week after the law's passage, Burnett wrote in a personal letter that the bill was intended to "keep clear of that most troublesome class of population."

Decades later, Burnett publicly described the exclusion law as intended to prevent disenfranchised black people from being exposed to politically empowered white people, which he wrote "reminds them of their inferiority", and suggested that their presence was "injurious to the dominant class itself, as such a degraded and practically defenseless condition offers so many temptations to tyrannical abuse". In his History of Oregon, William Gray described the law as "inhuman"; Burnett argued that Gray misrepresented the law.

The law had an unknown impact on black people in the state, and no records suggest it was ever directly enforced. However, its threatened enforcement against African American settler George Bush led the Bush-Simmons party, which arrived shortly after the law's adoption, to cut a new spur of the Oregon Trail northward across the Columbia River into disputed, British-controlled territory, where they founded the first U.S. settlement on the Puget Sound in present-day Washington State. Concern over the potential applicability of the exclusion law (which was understood to forbid black land ownership) to Washington lands prior to the creation of a separate Washington Territory later led Congress to pass a private law confirming Bush's title over his lands.

=== Text of the 1844 law and amendments ===
Though the official text of the original law has been lost, it was reprinted in several sources at the time. The law as described contained eight sections, and two amendments were added in December 1844. The Oregon exclusion law prohibited free black men and women in the territory, though jurisdiction for the law was limited to the region south of the Columbia river.

Section 1: That slavery and involuntary servitude shall be forever prohibited in Oregon.

Section 2: That in all cases where slaves shall have been, or shall hereafter be, brought into Oregon, the owners of such slaves respectively shall have the term of three years from the introduction of such slaves to remove them out of the country.

Section 3: That if such owners of slaves shall neglect or refuse to remove such slaves from the country within the time specified in the preceding section, such slaves shall be free.

Section 4: That when any free negro or mulatto shall have come to Oregon, he or she (as the case may be), if of the age of eighteen or upward, shall remove from and leave the country within the term of two years for males, and three for females, from the passage of this act, and that if any free negro or mulatto shall hereafter come to Oregon, if of the age aforesaid, he or she shall quite and leave the country within the term of two years for males and three for females, from his or her arrival in the county.

Section 5: That if such free negro or mulatto be under the age aforesaid, the terms of time specified in the preceding section shall begin to run when he or she arrive at such age.

Section 6: That if such free negro or mulatto shall fail to quit the country, as required by this act, he or she may be arrested upon a warrant issued by some justice of the peace, and, if guilty upon trial before such justice, shall receive upon his or her bare back not less than twenty nor more than thirty-nine stripes, to be inflicted by the constable of the proper county.

Section 7: That if any free negro or mulatto shall fail to quit the country within the term of six months after receiving such stripes, he or she shall again receive the same punishment once in every six months, until he or she shall quit the country.

Section 8: That when any slave shall obtain his or her freedom, the time specified in the fourth section shall begin to run from the time when such freedom shall be obtained.

==== December amendment ====
Be it enacted by the Legislative Committee of Oregon as follows:

Section 1: That the sixth and seventh sections of said act are hereby repealed.

Section 2: That if any such free negro or mulatto shall fail to quit and leave the country, as required by the act to which this is amendatory, he or she may be arrested upon a warrant issued by some justice of the peace, and if guilty upon trial before such justice ... the said justice shall issue his order to any officer competent to execute process, directing said officer to give ten days' public notice, by at least four written or printed advertisements, that he will publicly hire out such free negro or mulatto from the country for the shortest term of service, shall enter into a bond with good and sufficient security to Oregon, in a penalty of at least one thousand dollars, binding himself to remove said negro or mulatto out of the country within six months after such service shall expire; which bond shall be filed in the clerk's office in the proper county, and upon failure to perform the conditions of said bond, the attourney prosecuting for Oregon shall commence a suit upon a certified copy of such bond in the circuit court against such delinquent and his sureties.

== 1849 law ==
In September 1849, the legislature passed another exclusion law, with a preamble arguing that "it would be highly dangerous to allow free negroes and mulattos to reside in the Territory or to intermix with the Indians, instilling in their minds feelings of hostility against the white race". The 1849 law ordered any black people entering the territory to leave within 40 days. It was applied in 1851 to Jacob Vanderpool, a West Indian who had migrated to Oregon City. A white resident of the city brought a case against Vanderpool, who was arrested and ordered to leave Oregon within 30 days. The family of Abner Hunt Francis were ordered out of the state within 40 days, but were allowed to stay after a petition was signed by 225 citizens. The petition formed the basis of a failed coalition to amend the exclusion law to allow for good behavior bonds by black settlers. The Francis family moved to Canada in 1861. A petition was also used in 1854 to prevent the deportation of Morris Thomas and Jane Snowden.

Oregon's congressional delegate, Samuel Thurston, while seeking to limit federal land grants to white people, described the law to congress:

The negroes associate with the Indians and intermarry, and, if their free ingress is encouraged or allowed, there would a relationship spring up between them and the different tribes, and a mixed race would ensue inimical to the whites; and the Indians being led on by the negro who is better acquainted with the customs, language, and manners of the whites, than the Indian, these savages would become much more formidable than they otherwise would, and long and bloody wars would be the fruits of the commingling of the races.

The law was repealed in 1854.

== 1857 law ==
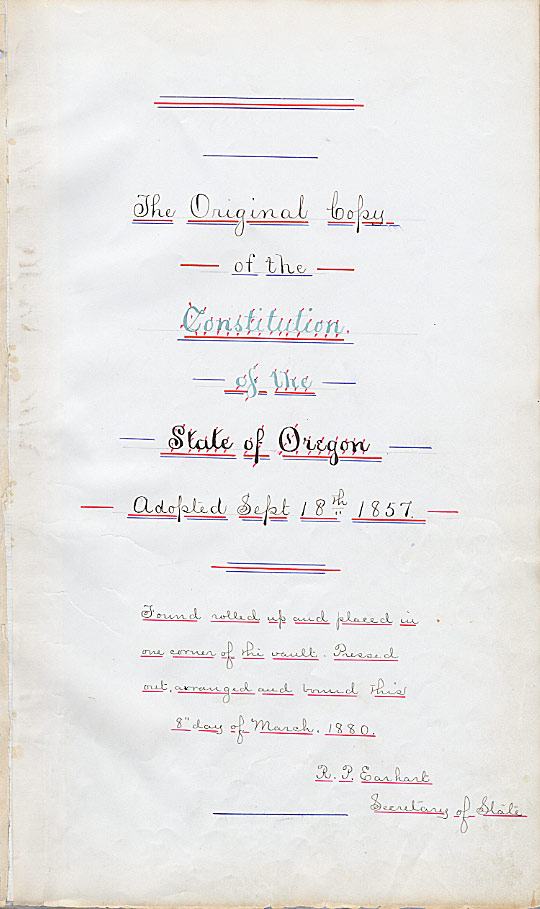
Title page of the Oregon state constitution, 1857

In 1857, after Oregon voters had voted for statehood, they subsequently called for a constitutional convention.

The emergent constitution contained 185 sections, 172 of which were taken from various other state constitutions, with the additions primarily being racial exclusion or finance related. The document enshrined an exclusion law into Section 35 of the Bill of Rights within the Oregon State Constitution. The article read as follows:

No free negro or mulatto not residing in this state at the time of the adoption of this constitution, shall come, reside or be within this state or hold any real estate, or make any contracts, or maintain any suit therein; and the legislative assembly shall provide by penal laws for the removal by public officers of all such negroes and mulattoes, and for their effectual exclusion from the state, and for the punishment of persons who shall bring them into the state, or employ or harbor them.

John McBride, later a state senator, described the amendment: "It was largely an expression against any mingling of the white with any of the other races, and upon a theory that as we had yet no considerable representation of other races in our midst, we should do nothing to encourage their introduction. We were building a new state on virgin ground; its people believed it should encourage only the best elements to come to us, and discourage others."

The question of slavery itself was put to a popular vote, with the public voting against slavery (by a vote of 7,727 to 2,645) but in favor of racial exclusion policies (by a vote of 8,640 to 1,081). The final constitution barred "negroes, mulattos and Chinamen" from voting or owning land in the state.

== Repeal ==
Oregon's racially discriminatory state constitutional amendment, Section 35, was legally invalidated after the Civil War by the ratification of the 14th Amendment to the federal Constitution in 1868. However, Section 35 remained formally on the books for another 58 years. In 1925, the Oregon legislature proposed the formal repeal of Section 35, adopted as House Joint Resolution 8 (1925). The measure was referred to Oregon voters as a 1926 ballot initiative which was approved with 62.5% in favor.

Measure 14 in 2002, approved by a vote of 71%–29%, removed references to the 1857 referendum from the constitution.

=== Legacy ===
From 1850 to 1860, Oregon saw its Black population increase by just 75, compared to an increase of 4,000 in neighboring California. Oregon's Black exclusion laws have been linked to a below-average Black population – two percent – into the present day. Historian Cheryl Brooks has argued that Oregon's small Black population has made it difficult for Oregonians to recognize racial discrimination problems in the state.

== See also ==
- Sundown town
