= The Oregon Encyclopedia =

Encyclopedia about the U.S. state

The Oregon Encyclopedia of History and Culture is a collaborative encyclopedia focused on the history and culture of the U.S. state of Oregon.

== Description ==
The encyclopedia is a project of Portland State University's History Department, the Oregon Council of Teachers of English, and the Oregon Historical Society. It has drawn support from Oregon Cultural Trust partners Oregon Arts Commission, Oregon Council for the Humanities, Oregon Cultural Heritage Commission, and the Oregon State Historic Preservation Office.

One of the project's three editors, Bill Lang, a professor of history at Portland State University, said one goal is to produce an online encyclopedia of Oregon's history "deep into the future." Lang also said the Oregon Encyclopedia will be like a traditional encyclopedia based on verified facts, but with "stuff no one knows about. Yet." Lang contrasted the project with Wikipedia, which he suggested was not based on verified facts. All entries are fact-checked, peer-reviewed, and edited by the project's five editors.

== History ==
It was announced on February 14, 2008, Oregon's 149th birthday. The project was initially launched as an online publication, with plans to eventually publish it in book form. The project originally aimed to produce about 3,000 articles. As of June 2020, it had over 1,750 published articles written by over 400 authors from around the state.

The encyclopedia's former development director, Sherry Manning, estimated the cost would be between $1 million and $2 million. A few days before the announcement date, over $175,000 had been raised and another $500,000 was pending.
