= Oregon Historical Quarterly =

- Discipline: History
- Language: English

Publication details
- Former name(s): The Quarterly of the Oregon Historical Society
- History: 1897–present
- Publisher: Oregon Historical Society (United States)
- Frequency: Quarterly

Standard abbreviations
- ISO 4: Or. Hist. Q.

Indexing
- ISSN: 0030-4727 (print); 2329-3780 (web)
- JSTOR: oregonhistq

Links
- Journal homepage

The Oregon Historical Quarterly is a peer-reviewed public history journal covering topics in the history of the U.S. state of Oregon, for both an academic and a general audience. It has been published continuously on a quarterly schedule by the Oregon Historical Society since 1900. From 1900 to 1925 it was known as The Quarterly of the Oregon Historical Society; its present title was adopted in 1926. Historian, economist, and sociologist Frederic George Young served as editor from the journal's inception through 1928. The journal's circulation of about 4,500 makes it one of the largest state historical publications in the United States.
