= Oregon Historical Society =

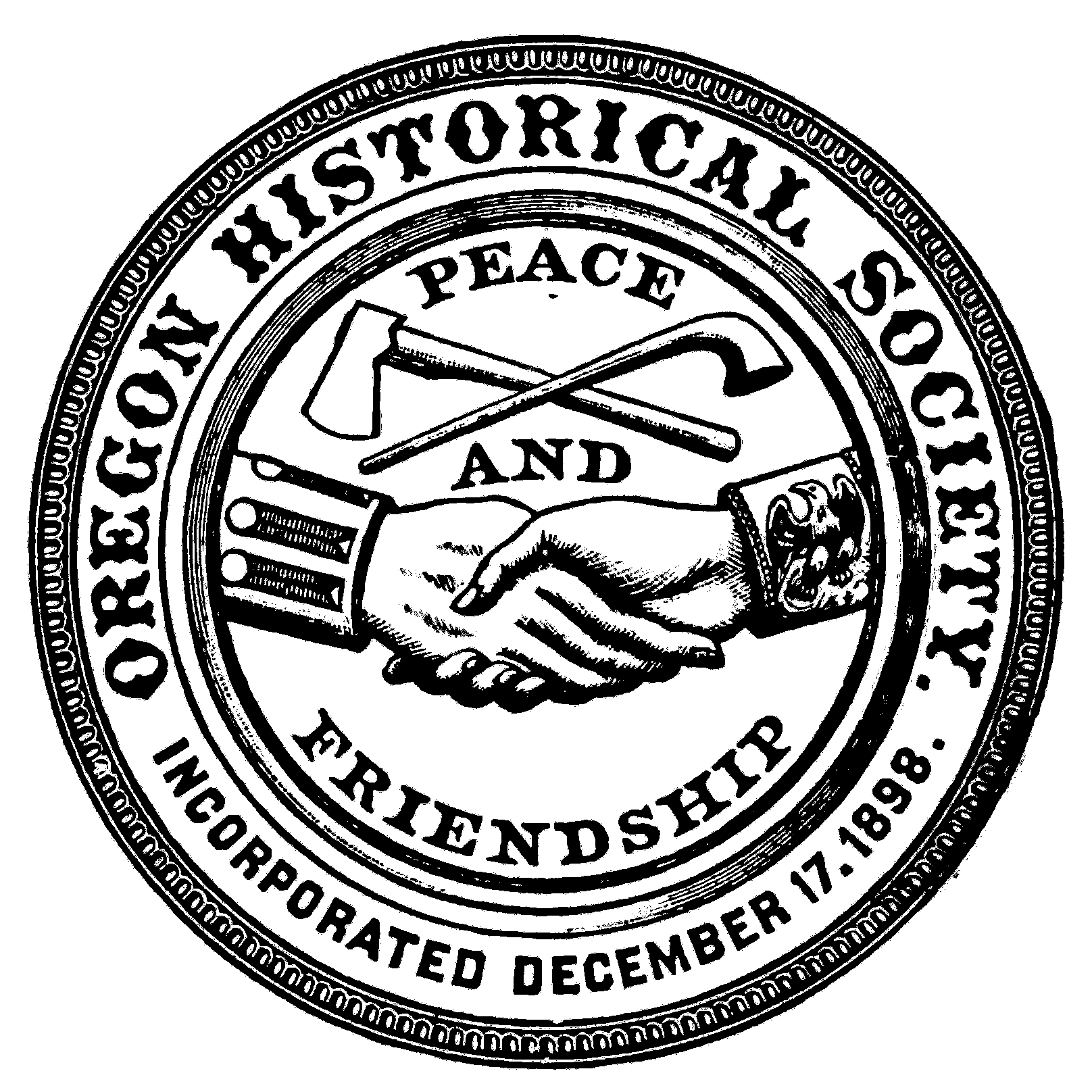
- Seal of the Oregon Historical Society
- Abbreviation: OHS
- Formation: December 17, 1898; 127 years ago
- Type: Historical society
- Headquarters: 1200 SW Park Avenue; Portland, Oregon
- Executive director: Kerry Tymchuk
- Website: ohs.org

The Oregon Historical Society (OHS) is an organization that encourages and promotes the study and understanding of the history of the State of Oregon, within the broader context of U.S. history. Incorporated in 1898, the Society collects, preserves, and makes available materials of historical character and interest, and collaborates with other groups and individuals with similar aims. The society operates the Oregon History Center that includes the Oregon Historical Society Museum in downtown Portland.

== History ==
The Society was organized on December 17, 1898, in Portland at the Portland Library Building. Its mission, as expressed in the first volume of its Oregon Historical Quarterly, was to "bring together in the most complete measure possible the data for the history of the commonwealth, and to stimulate the widest and highest use of them." The first president was Harvey W. Scott, with memberships totaling 370 in the first year. George H. Himes was appointed the Society's first curator in 1899, a post he retained for four decades, until February 1939.

Shortly after its formation, the Society opened its first office and museum in Portland City Hall and began the development of a regional research library and a collection of historical artifacts. In 1900, the first issue of the Oregon Historical Quarterly was printed as the official publication of the organization. In 1913, the Society moved from city hall to the Tourny Building, at 2nd and Taylor streets, but remained there for only 4½ years, moving again in September 1917 into Portland's then-new Public Auditorium (now Keller Auditorium). In 1966, the Society moved to its current location.

Thomas Vaughan stepped down from his 35-year directorship in 1989. Chet Orloff, who had left OHS in 1987 for the Ninth Judicial Circuit Historical Society in Pasadena, California, was considered by The Oregonian to be heir-apparent, but Bill Tramposch was brought in from Williamsburg, Virginia. Tramposch inherited a million-dollar deficit from the previous administration, and his three-year plan to eliminate the deficit, though supported by the board, was unpopular with many long-time staff members, who also criticized Tramposch's management style. Tramposch resigned in 1991, and Orloff returned as executive director in 1992. He remained in the position for nine years, retiring at the end of 2000.

George L. Vogt, a former president of the American Association for State and Local History was appointed as the eighth Executive Director of OHS in November 2006. In July 2007, the Oregon Historical Society was awarded a $2.8 million biennial appropriation from the State of Oregon, though the organization is not a state entity. The $2.8 million given by the state over the two years equals 30% of the annual operating budget. In 2011, Vogt retired and was replaced by Kerry Tymchuk, who was named permanent director in October 2011. The Society sold the Sovereign Hotel in 2014.

== Funding ==
In November 2010, Multnomah County voters approved a ballot initiative that included a five-year property tax levy to fund the institution and grant county residents free admission to the museum and research library. In 2011, the Oregon Legislative Assembly approved $2.5 million to assist the Society in paying off the mortgage on its 100,000-square-foot (9,300 m^{2}) temperature-controlled warehouse that preserves and protects the Society's artifacts, maps, books, films, and other assets. At the end of 2011, the Society received a $2 million bequest from the late Fred Fields, a noted businessman and philanthropist in Oregon.

== Divisions ==
The Society's museum, archives and research library contains approximately 8.5 million feet of film and videotape, over 2.5 million photographs, 85,000 artifacts, 30,000 books, 25,000 maps, 16,000 rolls of microfilm, 12,000 feet (3,700 m) of documents, and oral history preserved in more than 8,400 hours of recordings covering over 2,100 interviews. The society has one of the largest collections of historic photographs in the United States.

OHS has published the Oregon Historical Quarterly continuously since 1900. Since 1929, the Oregon Historical Society Press has published over 150 books on Oregon history, politics, culture, and biographies, including Oregon Geographic Names. As of 2009, the press has suspended operations. University of Washington Press is handling all distribution of OHS Press books still in print. Publication of the Oregon Historical Quarterly will continue.

The OHS Museum Store is located in the lobby of the National Register of Historic Places-designated Sovereign Hotel. The building was added to the register in 1981.

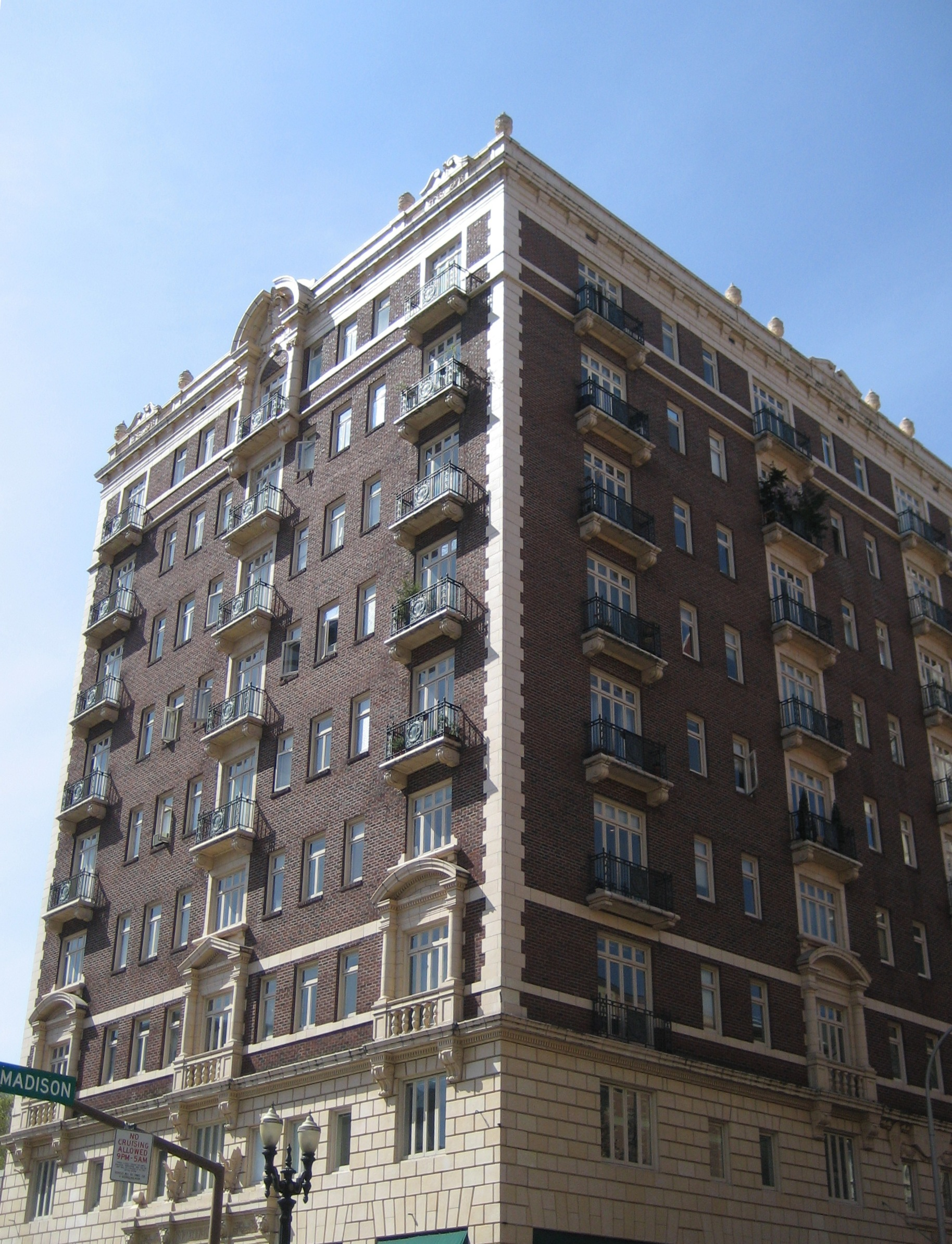
Sovereign Hotel

From 1986 to 2001, the Society used the former Meier & Frank Delivery Depot, in the Pearl District, to house its collection (except items on display at the museum at any given time) and for processing of new acquisitions. In 2000, after property values began rising due to redevelopment in the Pearl that started in the late 1990s, the Society sold that building, for $12.7 million. It moved its storage and processing to a warehouse in suburban Gresham over a four-month period in the first half of 2001. The Gresham warehouse was less conveniently located but had cost only $3.2 million to purchase, although modifications to that building were expected to raise the overall cost of the move to about $6 million.

== Legacy ==
Noting that the four successive presidents after Harvey Scott were attorneys, historian E. Kimbark MacColl stated:

young Portland lawyers at the turn of the [20th] century ... rose to civic prominence, ... became actively involved in the Oregon Historical Society, and ... were instrumental in fabricating an "Oregon Story" that was heavily laden with mythology, hero worship and pioneer idolization. [Charles H.] Carey, Scott, and others, constituted a group of politician-writers who advised: Don't hurt the party. Don't divide up America into classes by denouncing the rich and exciting "the envy and hatred of the poor." Spare the city's reputation. ... Carey and Scott would never admit they had made mistakes or that the old system was rotten.

== See also ==
- Frederick Van Voorhies Holman – former president of OHS
- List of historical societies in Oregon
- The Oregon Encyclopedia – in 2008, the OHS and the PSU history department announced plans to create an online encyclopedia.
- Neil Goldschmidt – in 2004, access to historical records of Goldschmidt's term as Governor brought the OHS's role in such matters under public scrutiny.
