= Moses Harris (mountain man) =

American trapper (??–1849)

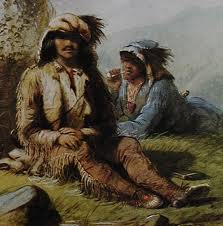
Alfred Jacob Miller, Trappers, depicting Moses "Black" Harris (left)

Moses Harris, also known as Black Harris (died May 6, 1849), was a trapper, scout, guide, and mountain man. (Note: He was also called Black Squire and Major Harris.) He participated in expeditions across the Continental Divide and to the Pacific Ocean through the Rocky and Cascade Mountains. He rescued westward-bound pioneers. Harris spoke the Shoshoni language.

== Early life ==
Moses Harris was said to have come from either South Carolina or Kentucky. (Note: W.H. Gray, author of History of Oregon (1870) stated that Harris was from Kentucky, which was said by James Clyman and Charles L. Camp to be doubtful.) He may have been partly African American. He has been described as a "free black mountain man", with dark skin and hair, as well as brown eyes. He was of medium height. (Note: Alfred Jacob Miller described Harris in 1837 as "a wiry form, made up of bone and muscle, with a face apparently composed of tan leather and whip cord, finished off with a peculiar blue-black tint, as if gunpowder had been burnt into his face.")

== Early years as a trapper ==
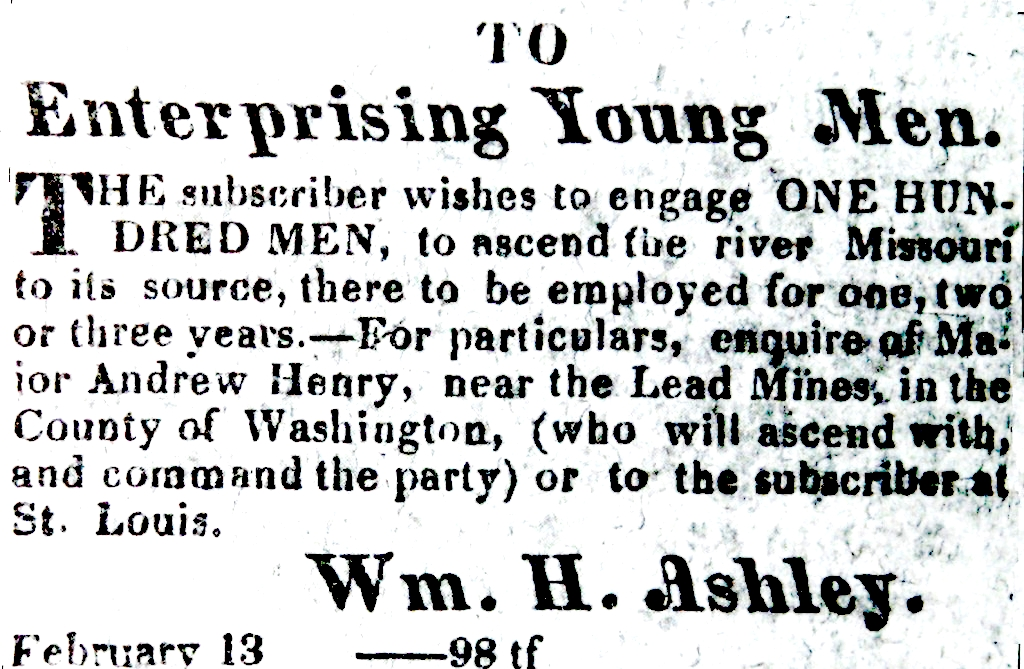
Advertisement from Missouri Gazette, February 13, 1822.

He may have trapped for William H. Ashley beginning in 1822. Harris was considered an experienced mountaineer and was knowledgeable about customs of Native Americans by 1823. In a letter to Thornton Grimsley in 1841, he mentioned that he had been well-known in the mountains for 20 years.

== Across the Great Divide ==
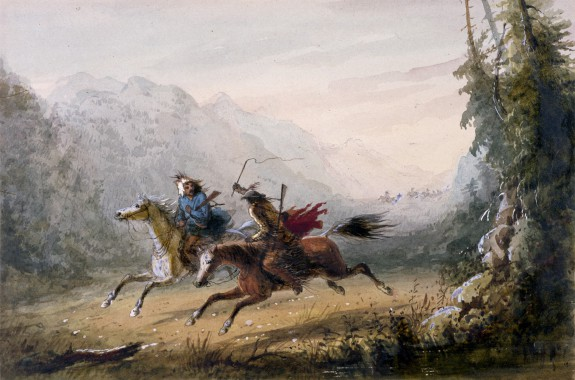
Alfred Jacob Miller, Escape from Blackfeet, watercolor on paper, Walters Art Museum. In addition to Miller's description of Moses Harris, he wrote text on the back of the painting that said: "This Black Harris always created a sensation at the camp fire, being a capital raconteur, and having had as many perilous adventures as any man probably in the mountains."

Harris was among a group of 26 men, led by General William H. Ashley, who ventured from Fort Atkinson on the Missouri, through the frontier, and across the Continental Divide in 1824. The goal was to reach Green River by following the Platte River, North Platte River, the Sweetwater and South Pass. The group of men included James Beckwourth, Thomas Fitzpatrick, Robert Campbell, and Baptiste la Jeunesse. Warned that it would be better to take the South Platte River, Ashley altered the route. The journey began with a blizzard that resulted in the death of a number of their 50 pack horses and a group of horses were later stolen by a party of Crow people.

Ashley here plotted the first section of the central overland route to the Pacific. He was the first white man to travel this route in the dead of winter, and the first to use that variation of the South Pass, called by the name of one of his employees, James Bridger. He was the first American to investigate the mountains of Northern Colorado, the first to enter the Great Divide Basin, to cross almost the entire length of Southern Wyoming, and the first to navigate the dangerous canyons of the Green River.

— Harrison Clifford Dale

== Trapper and guide ==
In the winter of 1825-1826, William Sublette chose Harris to travel with him from the mountains to St. Louis. They traveled with a train of pack dogs and wore snow shoes. The two men guided Ashley through the South Pass the following spring.

Harris became an expert in winter travel after spending years fur trapping in the mountains and is also said to have lived in Missouri in the 1830s. Besides his work as a trapper, he also guided caravans of trappers.

He was a free trapper by 1832, meaning that he was not affiliated with a fur trading company. He was among the 150 trappers that attended the fur-trade rendezvous at Pierre's Hole in July 1832. The following spring, he was with other trappers when they were attacked by Arikara Native Americans. Their horses were taken from them, but they had seven packs of beaver. Harris walked to the rendezvous that year. He traveled back to St. Louis with Dr. Benjamin Harrison in 1833.

Harris has been identified as one of the builders of Fort Laramie (1834–1835).

In 1836, Harris guided Narcissa and Marcus Whitman of the Whitman-Spalding party for part of their trip to Oregon. Narcissa Prentiss Whitman wrote in her diary that she had tea with Harris on June 4, 1836. They went together as far as the Green River fur-trade rendezvous.

In 1837, Alfred Jacob Miller created sketches during his 1837 expedition through the Green River Valley to the annual fur-trader's rendezvous in western Wyoming where there were about 120 trappers. The route that Miller traveled became part of the Oregon Trail. Miller later created 200 watercolors from the sketches, with descriptive text, which were put into a collection The West of Alfred Jacob Miller.

In 1838, Harris was hired by a fur company—owned by Andrew Dripps, William Drummond Stewart and William Sublette—to guide a group including American Board missionary couples and Johann August Sutter from the Pawnee Agency northwest of Independence, Missouri to the rendezvous at the Green River. The missionaries bound for Oregon included Cushing Eells, Elkanah Walker, Cornelius Rogers, William H. (W.H.) Gray, and Asa Bowen (A.B.) Smith. Thomas Fitzpatrick, a trapper, also traveled with the group. (Note: Myra F. Eells mentions Harris in her journal on April 28, May 26, and July 4 of 1838.)

Harris traveled with a group of trappers and missionaries to the rendezvous in 1839. The missionaries continued their journey from the Green River to Oregon. Harris guided the group for part of the journey, but was considered "terribly expensive" and was replaced by Robert Newall. At the rendezvous, Harris was angry and drunk when he took a potshot against Newell. He was then removed from the fur-trading event.

== Wagon train guide ==
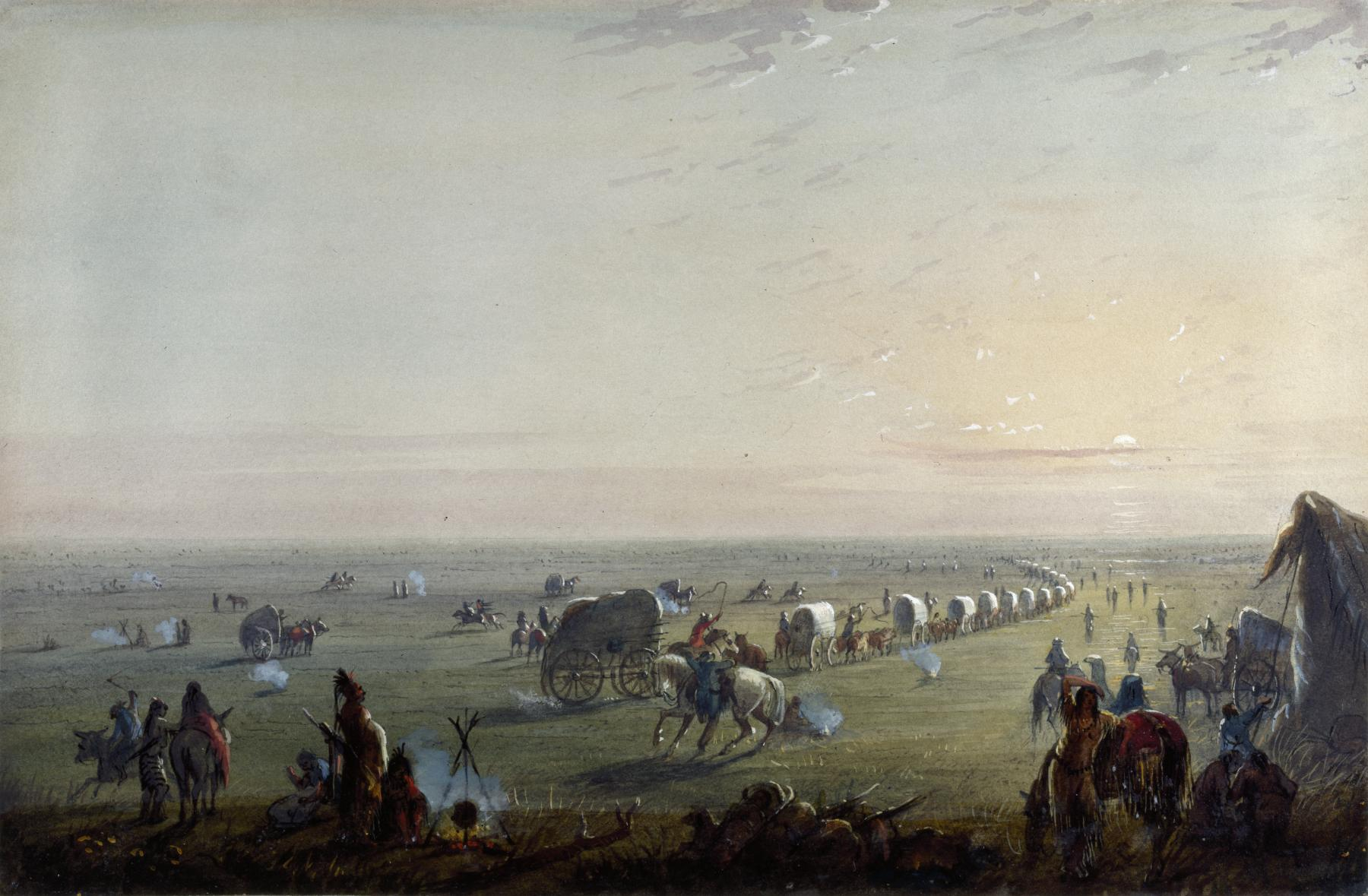
Alfred Jacob Miller, Breaking up Camp at Sunrise, 1858 to 1860, watercolor on paper, Walters Art Museum

Harris often led pioneers west from Fort Hall in Idaho to northern Nevada, California and Oregon. To do so, he helped find better routes across the Cascade Mountains. Fort Hall was initially established by American fur trader Nathaniel Jarvis Wyeth, but it was sold to the Hudson's Bay Company in 1837. Harris wrote to Thornton Grimsley of his concern that the British wanted to keep Americans out of Oregon Country and that they incited Native Americans to scalp Americans. He stated that they also controlled the sale of one to two million pelts and furs out of American territory each year. Harris offered that he, with hundreds of others, would support Grimsley in removing the British and Native Americans from Oregon.

The New Orleans Picayune published sketches of Harris's mountain travels before January 1844. The paper announced Harris's upcoming expedition from Independence, Missouri to Oregon, which was expected to take four months to complete. In 1844, he was a guide for a group of 500 pioneers, including George Washington Bush, who migrated west to settle in the Willamette Valley of present-day Oregon. The company was led by Captain Nathaniel Ford and Captain John Thorp from the Platte River to the Green River, and ultimately to Fort Vancouver. It was an unusually rainy spring resulting in flooding and muddy trails that slowed the wagon train's progress. In two months, they had only been able to travel 100 miles (160 km). A number of people suffered from dysentery and rheumatism. Three of eleven men who were traveling west for their health died within a few days of one another.

In 1845, he was part of a party that set out to find a way for covered wagons to traverse the Cascade Mountains. It was led by Dr. Elijah White and left on July 12, 1845 from a location near the old mission in present-day Salem, Oregon. With no success, the endeavor was tried two more times in 1846. A southern route was found and called the Applegate Trail, which was better than the Barlow Road.

In 1845 and 1846, he was a leader of relief parties to save people in wagon trains who were lost, starving, and sick - or similarly struggling after having been attacked by Native Americans, who defended their communal territories that were being decimated through wasteful hunting, overgrazing, highly contagious diseases by the estimated 400,000 travelers between the 1840s and the 1860s. Among those that were saved were Hugh Linza McNary (father of Charles L. McNary and John Hugh McNary), Tabitha Moffatt Brown, Jesse Quinn Thornton, Rev. J.A. Cornwall, and Rice Dunbar. When a wagon train led by Stephen Meek was lost in the high desert, Harris bargained for supplies with local Native Americans and led those who had survived the journey to The Dalles. He also helped rescue a group stranded in southern Oregon on the Applegate Trail.

Harris was known for his stories about real experiences and fanciful tales. He was also known to be a "brave and useful man".

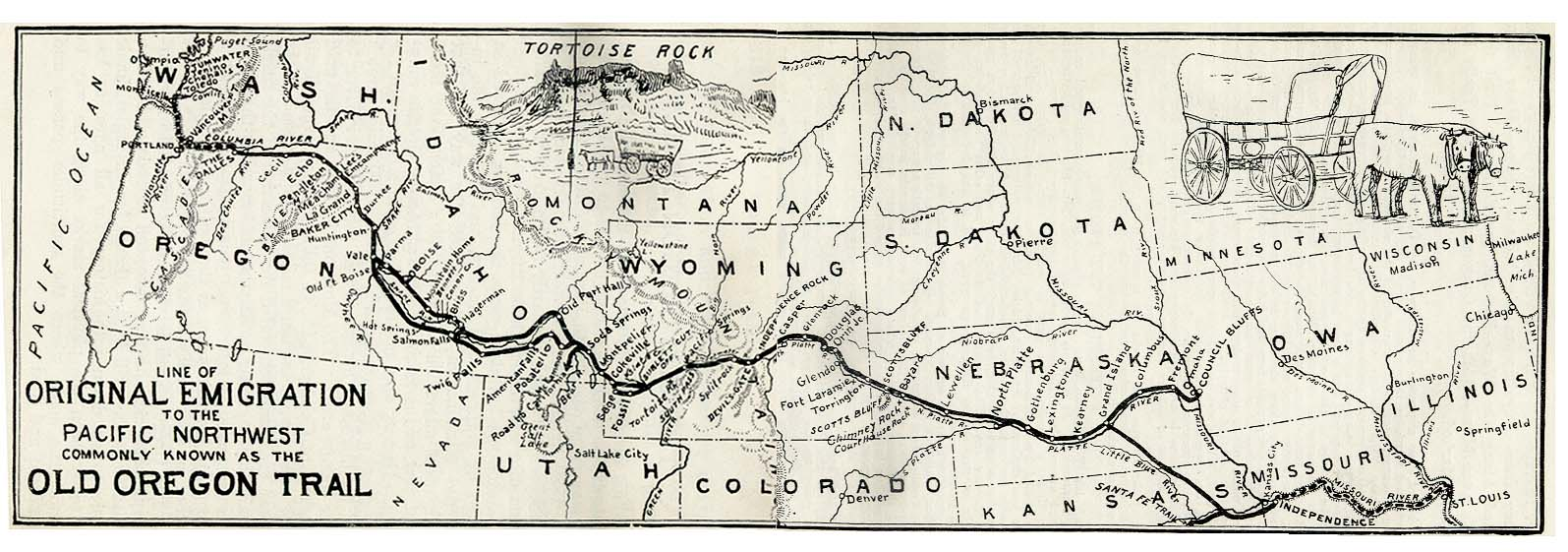
Harris traveled the Oregon Trail from as far east as Missouri, and is known to have been particularly active guiding wagon trains west from Fort Hall in southeastern Idaho

== Later years and death ==
He returned to the United States from Oregon Country in 1846. He died of cholera (Note: He was also said to have died of typhoid fever.) in Independence, Missouri on May 6, 1849. Cholera epidemics struck Missouri periodically from 1833 until 1873 with the worst occurrences in 1849.

James Clyman wrote a mock epitaph for his friend in 1844:

Here lies the bones of old Black Harris
who often traveled beyond the far west
and for the freedom of Equal rights
he crossed the snowy mountain heights.
He was a free and easy kind of soul
especially with a Belly full.

== Sources ==
- Bancroft, Hubert Howe (1888). History of Oregon. 1886-88. The History Company.
- Barry, Louise (1972). The Beginning of the West: Annals of the Kansas Gateway to the American West, 1540-1854. Kansas State Historical Society. ISBN 978-0-87726-001-1.
- Clyman, James; Camp, Charles L. (1925). "James Clyman: His Diaries and Reminiscences (Continued)". California Historical Society Quarterly. 4 (3): 272–283. doi:10.2307/25177768. ISSN 0008-1175. JSTOR 25177768.
