= Mt. Union Cemetery =

Cemetery in Benton County, Oregon, U.S.

Coordinates: 44°32′15″N 123°20′01″W

- Interactive map of Mt. Union Cemetery

Details
- Established: May 1, 1861
- Location: Philomath, Oregon, United States
- Type: Non-profit
- Size: 7 acres (2.8 ha)
- No. of graves: 2,500 (approximate)

Mt. Union Cemetery is a historic non-profit cemetery, located in Philomath, Oregon, United States. It was listed on the Benton County Historic Register on November 14, 1994. It is also known as Newton Cemetery.

== History ==
The land for the Mt. Union Cemetery was donated by Reuben Shipley and his wife Mary Jane Holmes Shipley Drake, with the stipulation that both Black people and White people could be buried there. Mt. Union was the first cemetery in the region to permit burials of multiple races. The Shipleys were both formerly enslaved, and donated 3 acres of their land on May 1, 1861. Both Reuben Shipley and Mary Jane Holmes Shipley Drake are buried in Mt. Union Cemetery.

The cemetery has expanded over the years to seven acres, with over two thousand graves. The headstone for Reuben Shipley procured by his son displays the surname of Ficklin, which is presumed to have been the name of an earlier enslaver. The cemetery entrance has a large granite marker honoring the Shipleys, which was installed in 1981. The historical writer R. Gregory Nokes describes Mt. Union cemetery as "a lasting legacy to racial cooperation and understanding".

Approximately 2,500 people are buried at the cemetery, with additional space for 1,500 to 1,700 more. A new section was added to the cemetery in the 1970s. Mt. Union Cemetery is located by Mount Union Avenue, though some sources cite this location as the rationale for its name, it is believed that the name was chosen to show unity with the anti-slavery movement during the Civil War.

== Notable interments ==
- Reuben Shipley (c. 1800 – 1872)
- Mary Jane Holmes Shipley Drake (1841–1925)
