= Robin Holmes =

Robin Holmes was the plaintiff in an 1852 court case to free his enslaved children in the Oregon Territory.

== Life ==
Robin Holmes was born enslaved in Virginia in 1810. He stated that he and his wife, Polly, had been enslaved by US Army Major in Missouri for twelve years before they were seized to pay the major's debts. Politician and landowner Nathaniel Ford claimed the Holmes as his own, though Holmes would later dispute the legality of the sale.

In 1843, Ford, who was 2400 dollars in debt, mortgaged Robin and Polly Holmes and five of their six children. He regained ownership of Robin Holmes, Polly Holmes, and two of their children. The others- William, Eliza, and Clarisa- he either lost permanently or sold. Based on dates recorded by the Fords, Eliza, the oldest of the three, would have been twelve years old.

On May 14, 1844, the Ford and Holmes families set out for the Oregon Territory. Ford's descendants claimed that Ford was reluctant to bring Robin Holmes along, but was swayed by Holmes's pleas to stay with the Fords. Robin Holmes himself testified that he had been offered freedom in exchange for helping Ford settle in Oregon, an account that Ford did not dispute in his own testimony. Mary Jane, Harriet, and Celi Ann, Holmes's three remaining daughters, were also brought along.

== Holmes v. Ford ==
In 1850, Mr. Ford granted freedom to Robin, Polly, and one of the children, leaving four children enslaved (two children had been born to the couple between 1844 and 1850). One of the children, Harriet, died in 1851. Robin Holmes then sued Nathaniel Ford for his children's freedom in 1852.

The case, Holmes v. Ford, was brought before the Oregon Territorial Supreme Court on July 13, 1853, and the children were awarded to their parents after a fourteen-month trial.
