= Alfred Jacob Miller =

American painter (1810–1874)

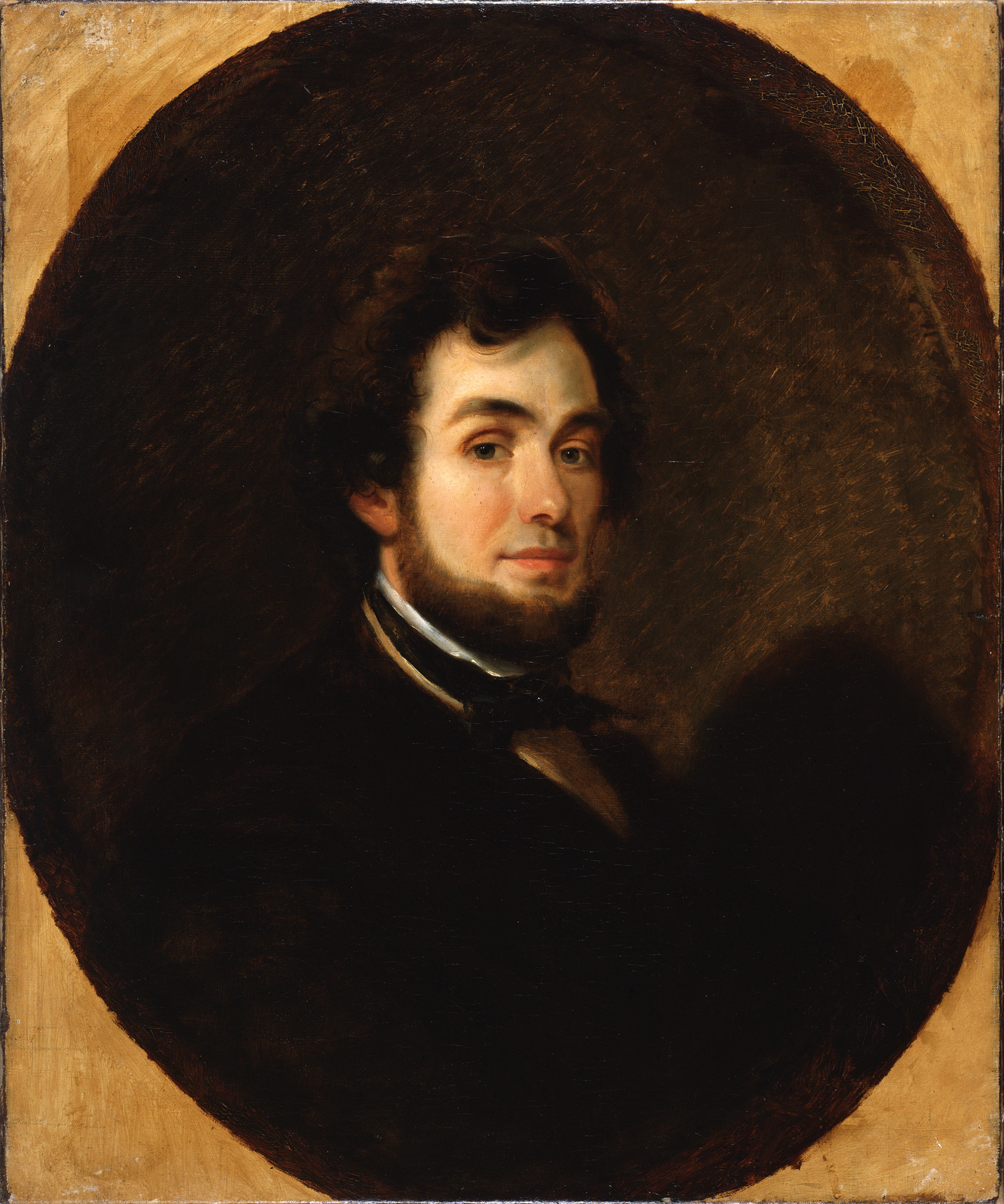
- Self-Portrait, c. 1850
- Born: January 2, 1810; Baltimore, Maryland
- Died: June 26, 1874 (aged 64); Baltimore, Maryland
- Known for: Painting
- Notable work: The Trapper's Bride; The Lost Greenhorn; Attack by Crow Indians; Breakfast at Sunrise and others

Alfred Jacob Miller (January 2, 1810 – June 26, 1874) was an American artist best known for his paintings of trappers and Native Americans in the fur trade of the western United States. He also painted numerous portraits and genre paintings in and around Baltimore during the mid-nineteenth century.

== Life ==
Miller was born in Baltimore, Maryland, the eldest of nine children of George W. and Harriet J. Miller. Miller's father was a merchant and tavern keeper in central Baltimore, and also had a farm in Hawkins Point. Miller attended a private school in Baltimore, John D. Craig's Academy, but did not receive formal art instruction there. He may have received his first lessons in art from Thomas Sully. In 1832, with the financial support of his family and art patrons in Baltimore, Miller traveled to Paris to study art. He was admitted as an auditor to life drawing classes at the École des Beaux-Arts, and copied paintings in the collections of the Louvre. In 1833, he traveled to Italy, visiting Bologna, Florence, and Venice before settling in Rome, where he studied at the English Life School. During his travels in Europe, he became friends with the Danish sculptor Bertel Thorwaldsen and studied with the French painter Horace Vernet.

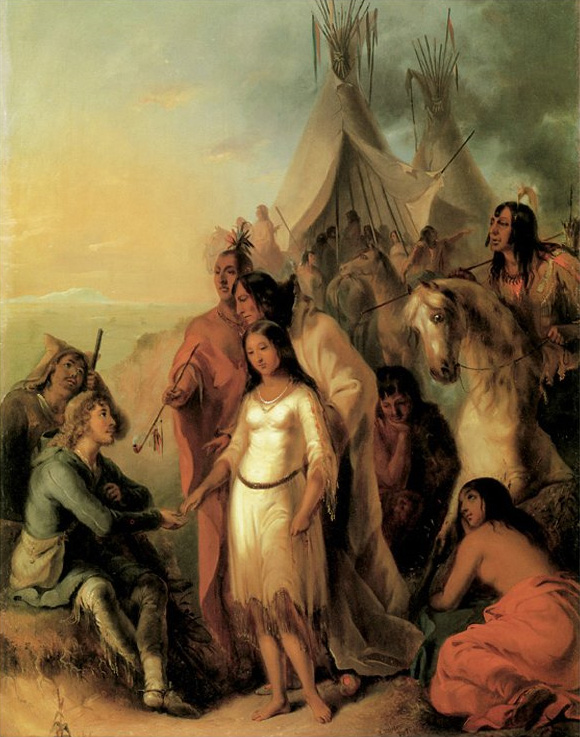
Bartering for a Bride (The Trapper's Bride), 1845, oil on canvas, 36 x 28 in., Eiteljorg Museum of American Indians and Western Art, Indianapolis, Indiana

He returned to Baltimore in 1834, where he opened a downtown studio and advertised himself as a painter of portraits and Old Master copies. Professional and financial difficulties may have prompted his decision to move to New Orleans in 1837. The city was a relatively open market for artists, and Miller quickly established a studio on Chartes Street and began receiving orders for portraits. It was in his studio that he met the Scottish aristocrat and adventurer, Sir William Drummond Stewart.

Stewart hired Miller to accompany him and record his hunting journey to the Rocky Mountains. That same year, along with representatives of the American Fur Company, they ventured as far as Fort William and Green River.

After returning to New Orleans later that year, Miller started working up his sketches in watercolors and oils. The scenes and incidents of the hunting journey were the foundation of a series of paintings documenting Native Americans of the United States. In July 1838 Miller was able to arrange an exhibition in New Orleans. In October 1840 he traveled with his paintings to Stewart's Murthly Castle in Scotland, where a collection of his commissioned work was ultimately hung.

After spending a year in Scotland and another in London, Miller returned to Baltimore in April 1842. He established himself as an acknowledged portrait artist in the city. He died on June 26, 1874.

== Paintings ==
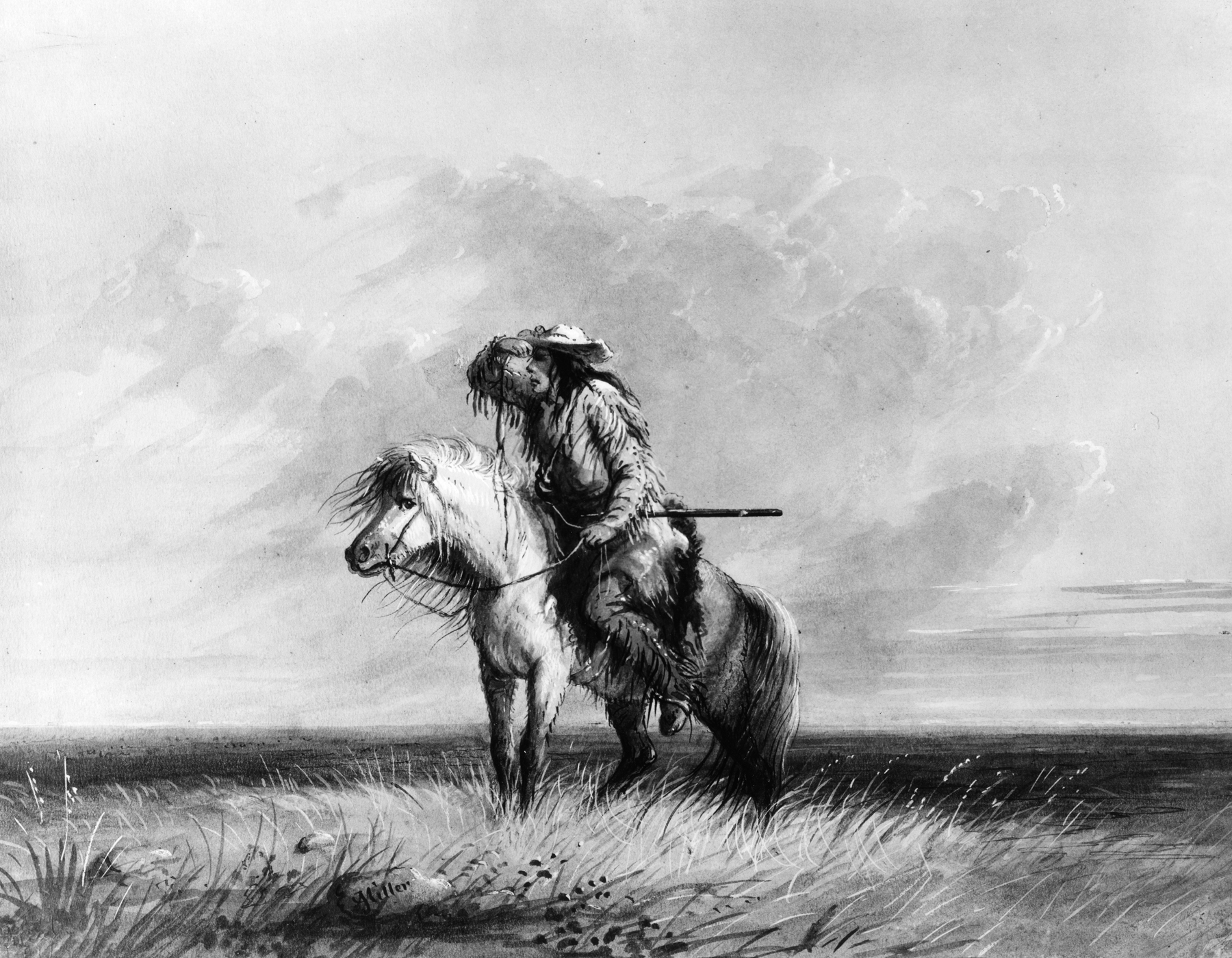
The Lost Greenhorn, 1858–1860, Walters Art Museum

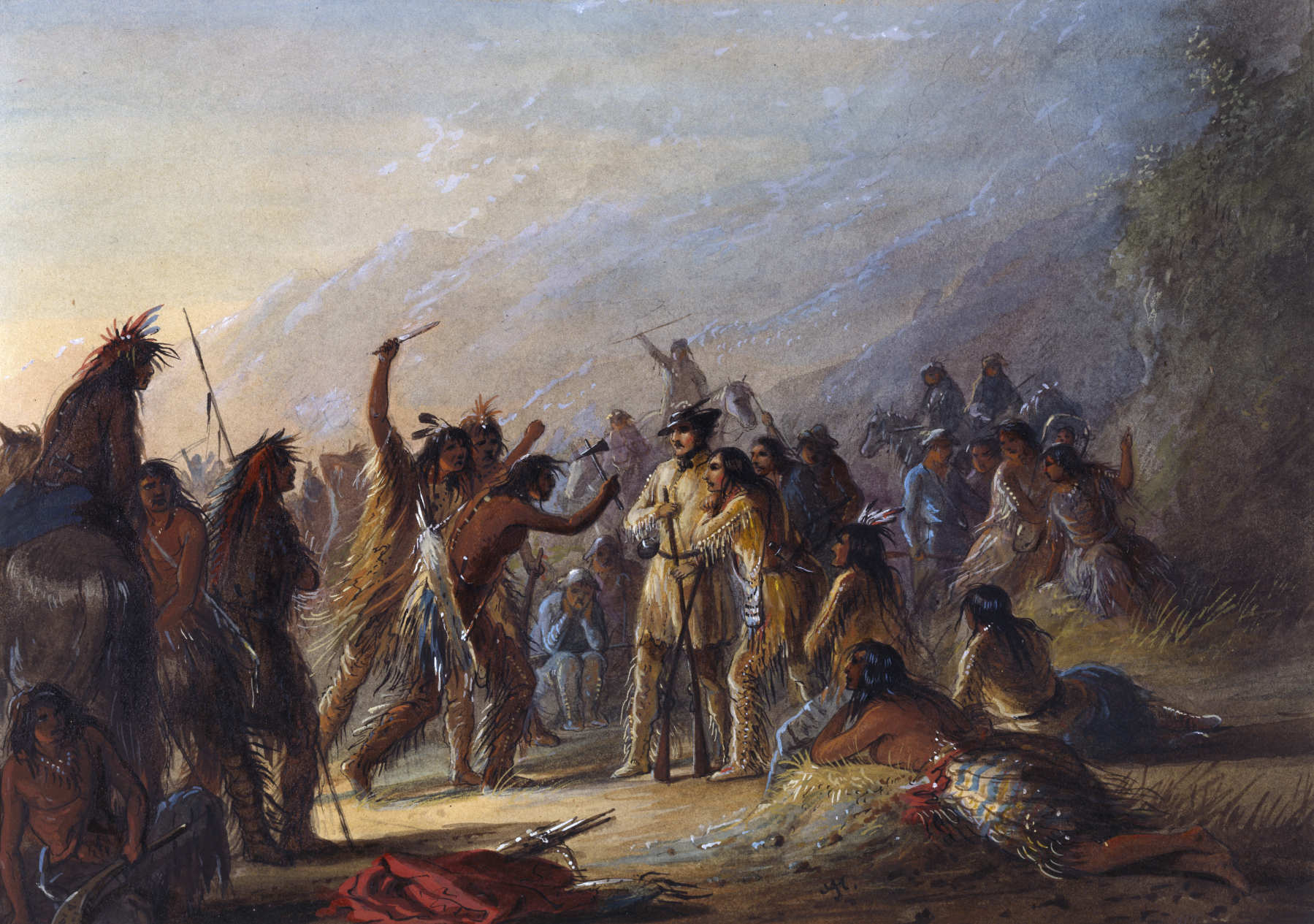
Attack by Crow Indians, 1858–1860, Walters Art Museum

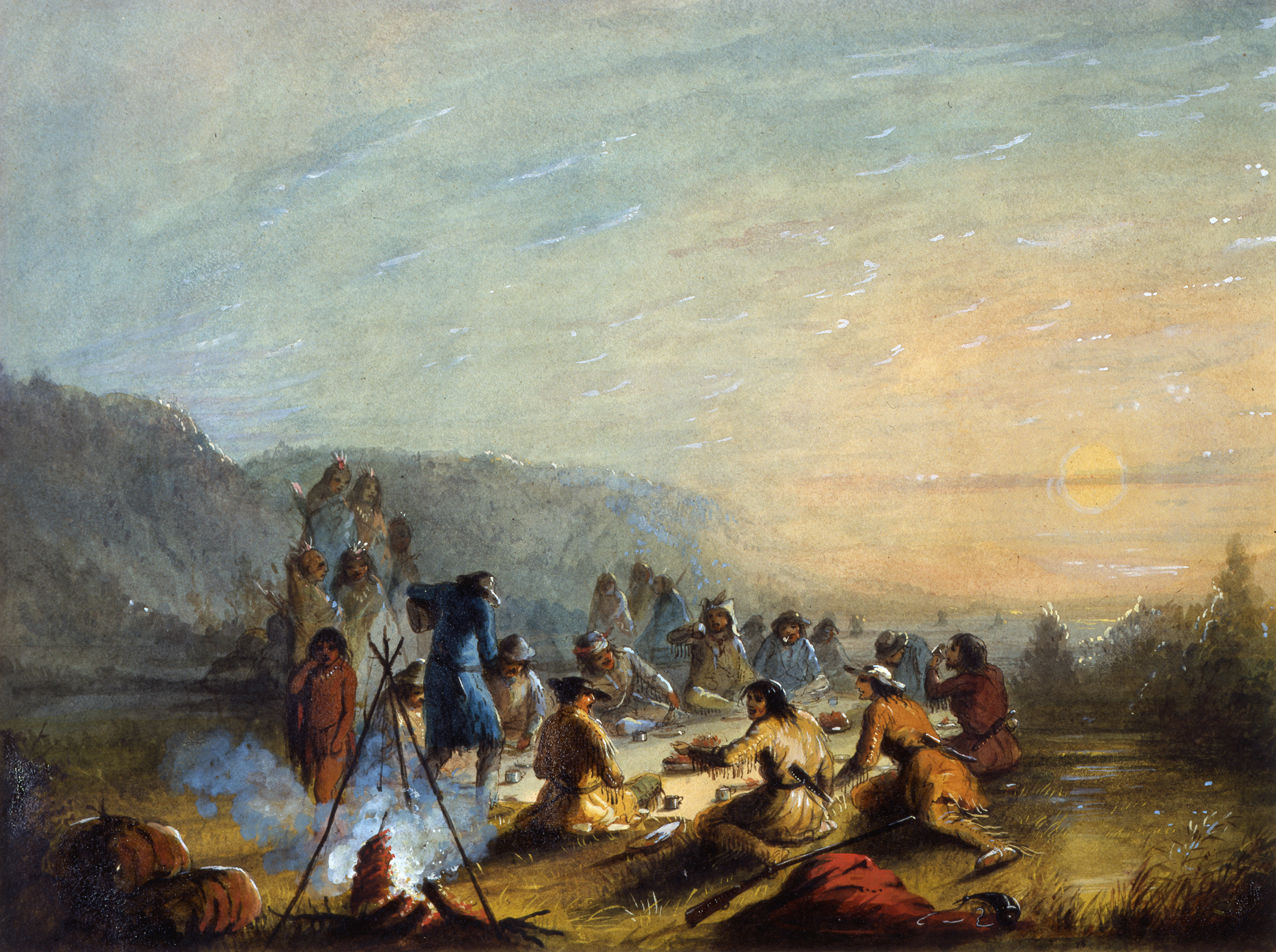
Breakfast at Sunrise, 1858–1860, Walters Art Museum

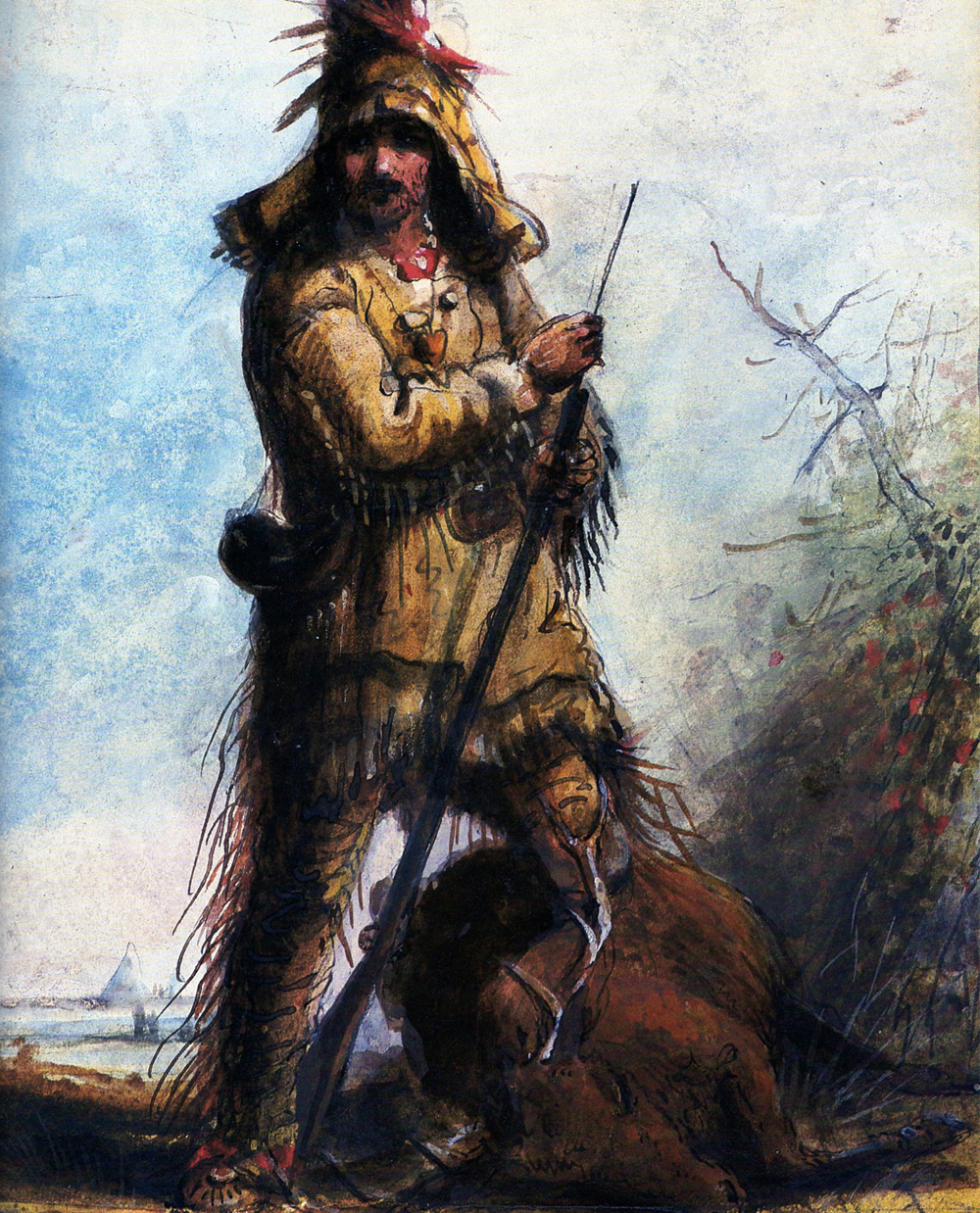
Old Bill Williams, 1839

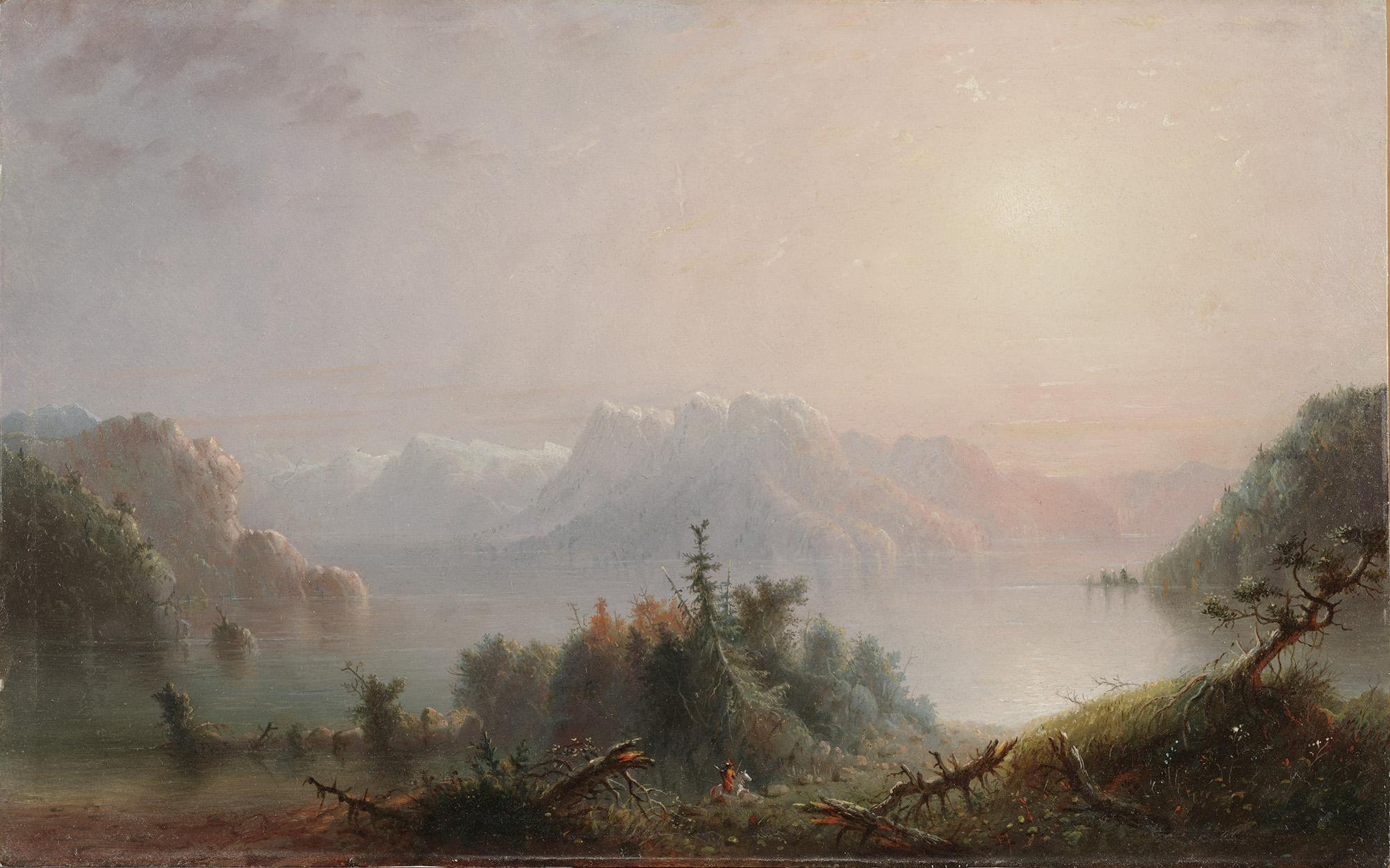
The Lake Her Lone Bosom Expands to the Sky, 1850, Dallas Museum of Art

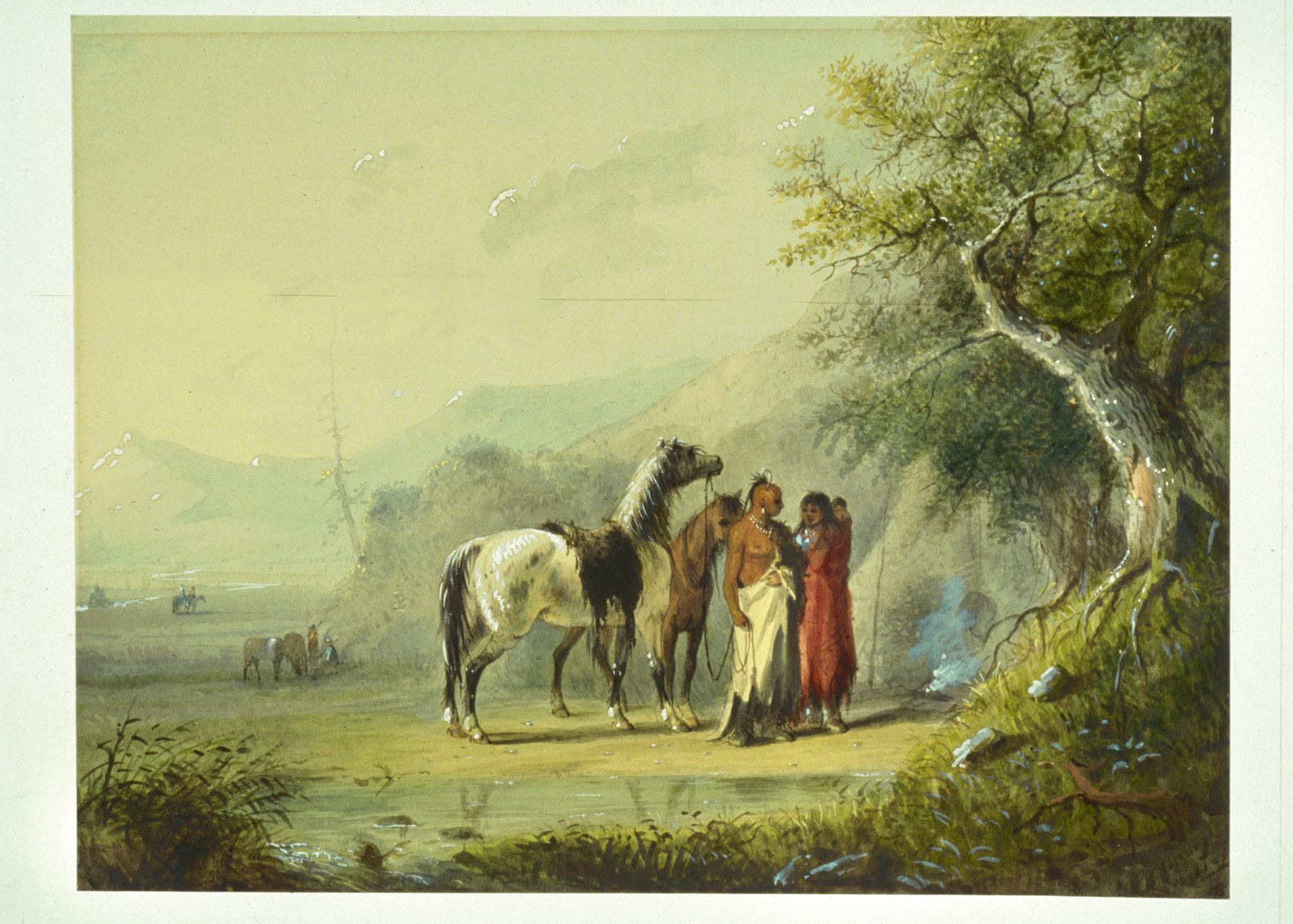
Camp Scene (Sioux), 1858–1860, Walters Art Museum

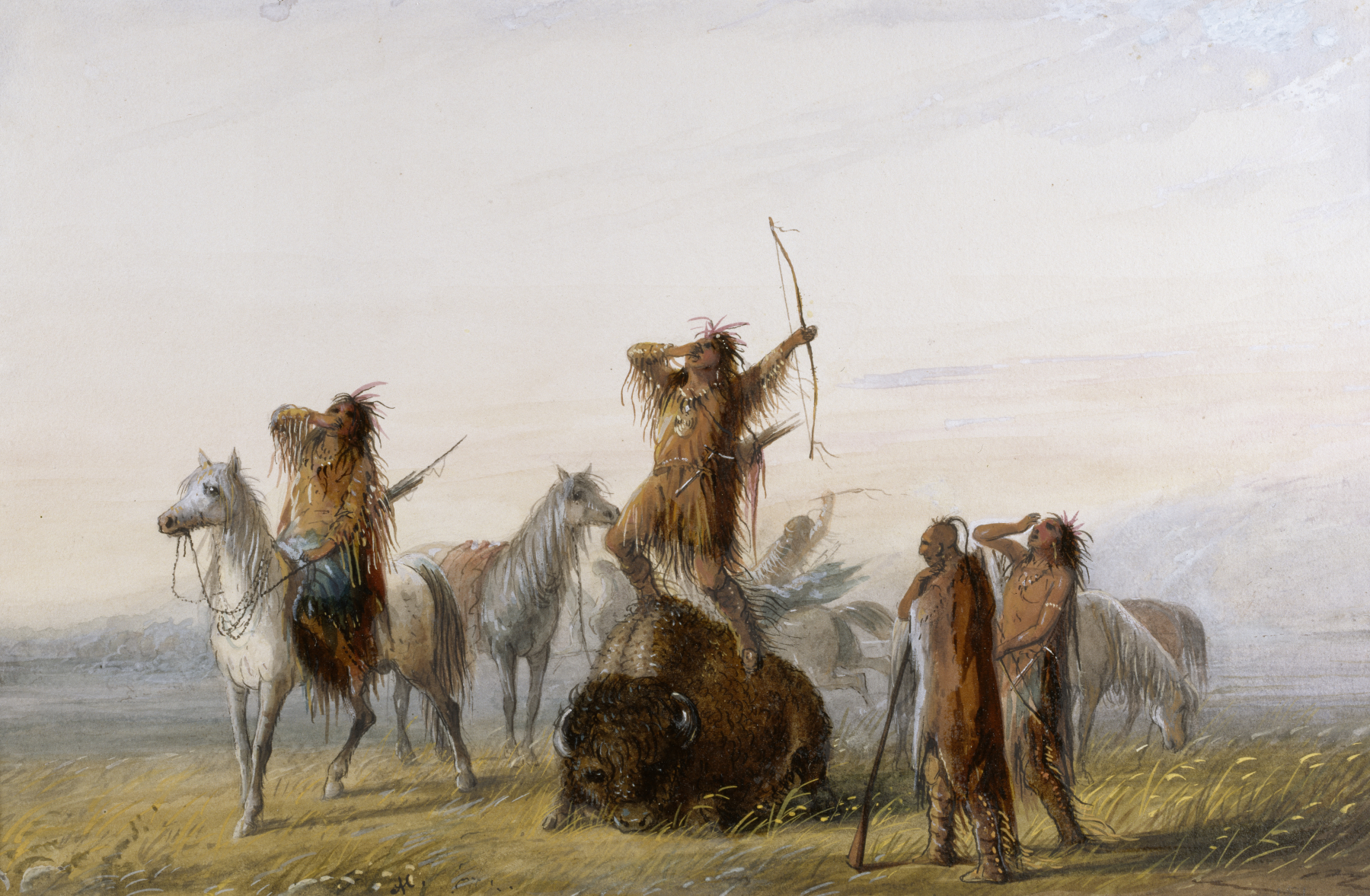
Yell of Triumph, 1858-1860, Walters Art Museum

Cavalcade, 1858–1860, Walters Art Museum

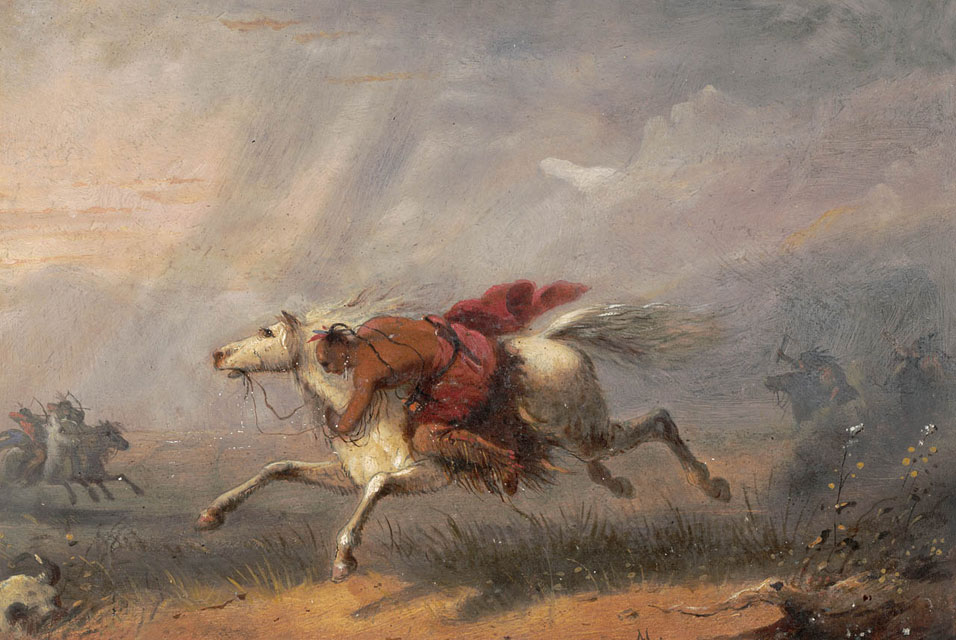
War Path

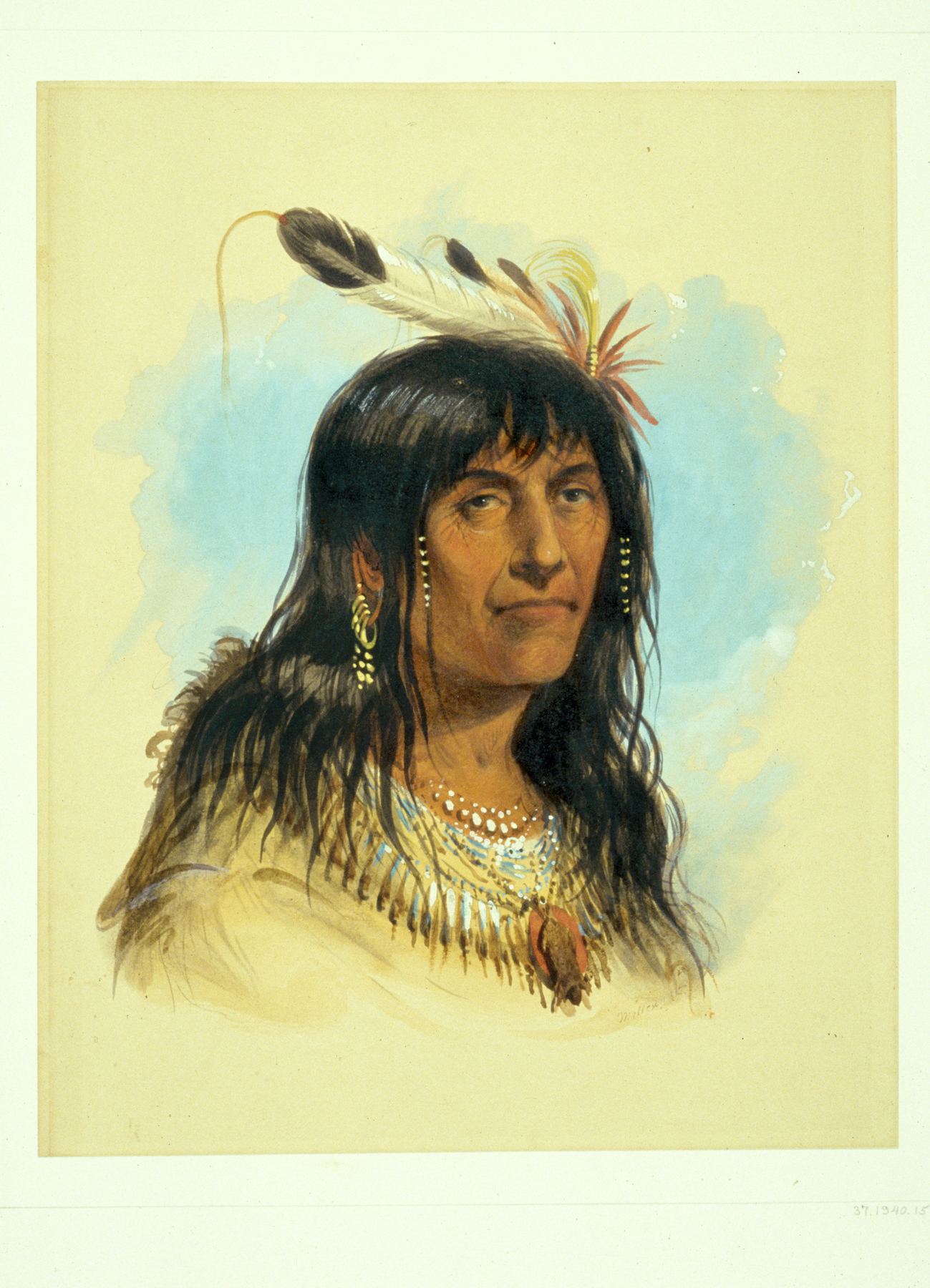
Big Bowl (A Crow Chief), 1858–1860, Walters Art Museum

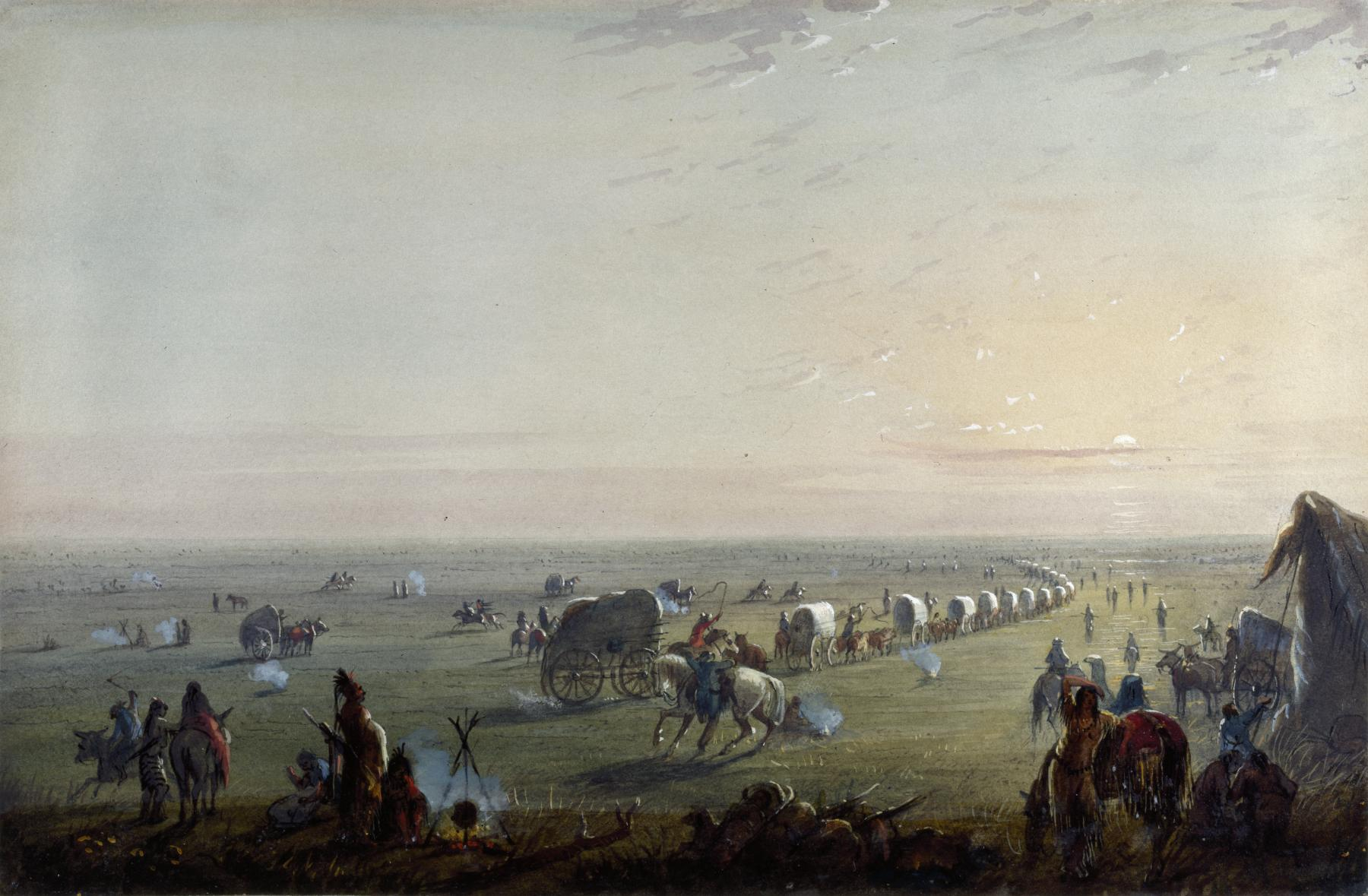
Breaking up Camp at Sunrise, 1858–1860, Walters Art Museum

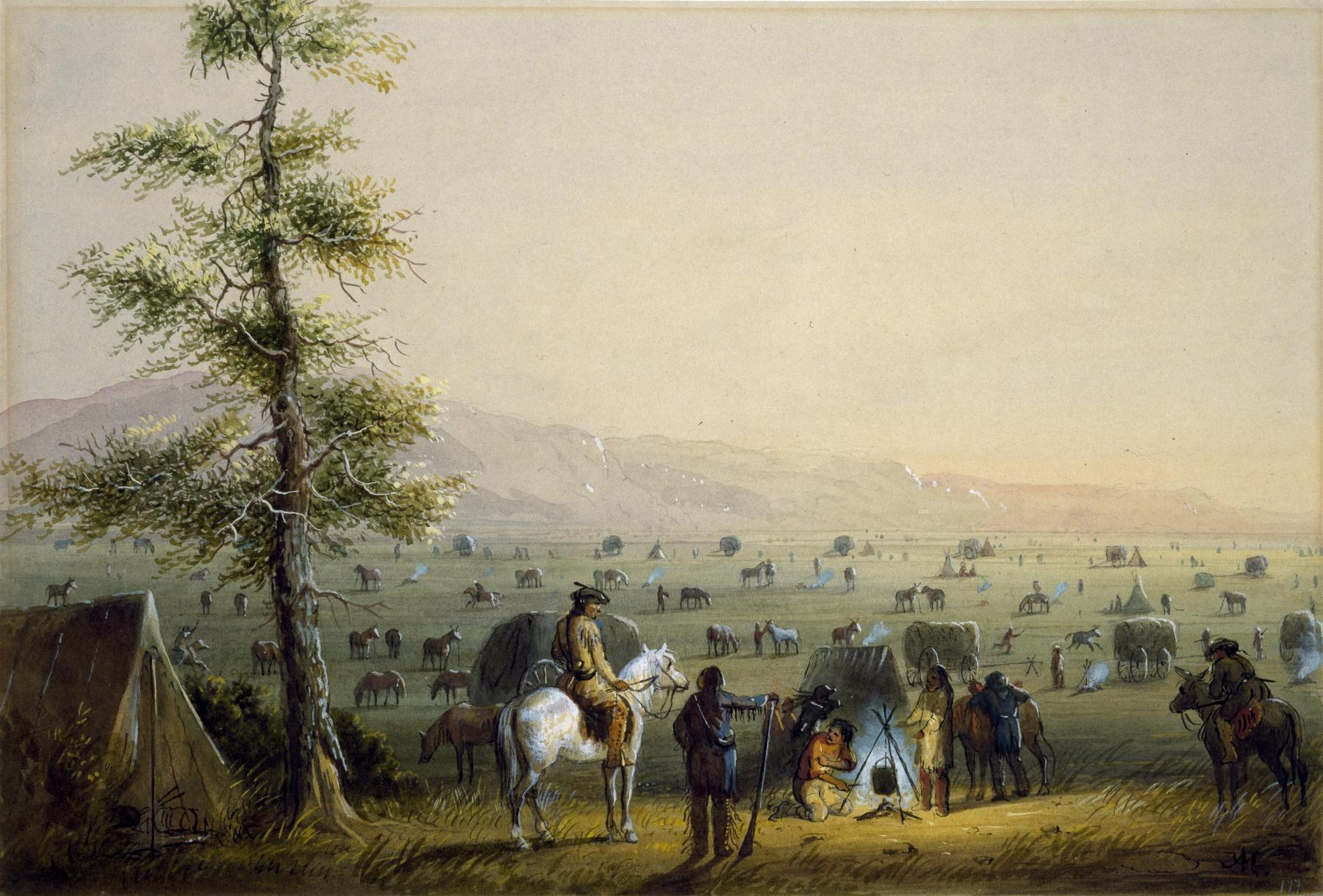
Our Camp, 1858–1860, Walters Art Museum

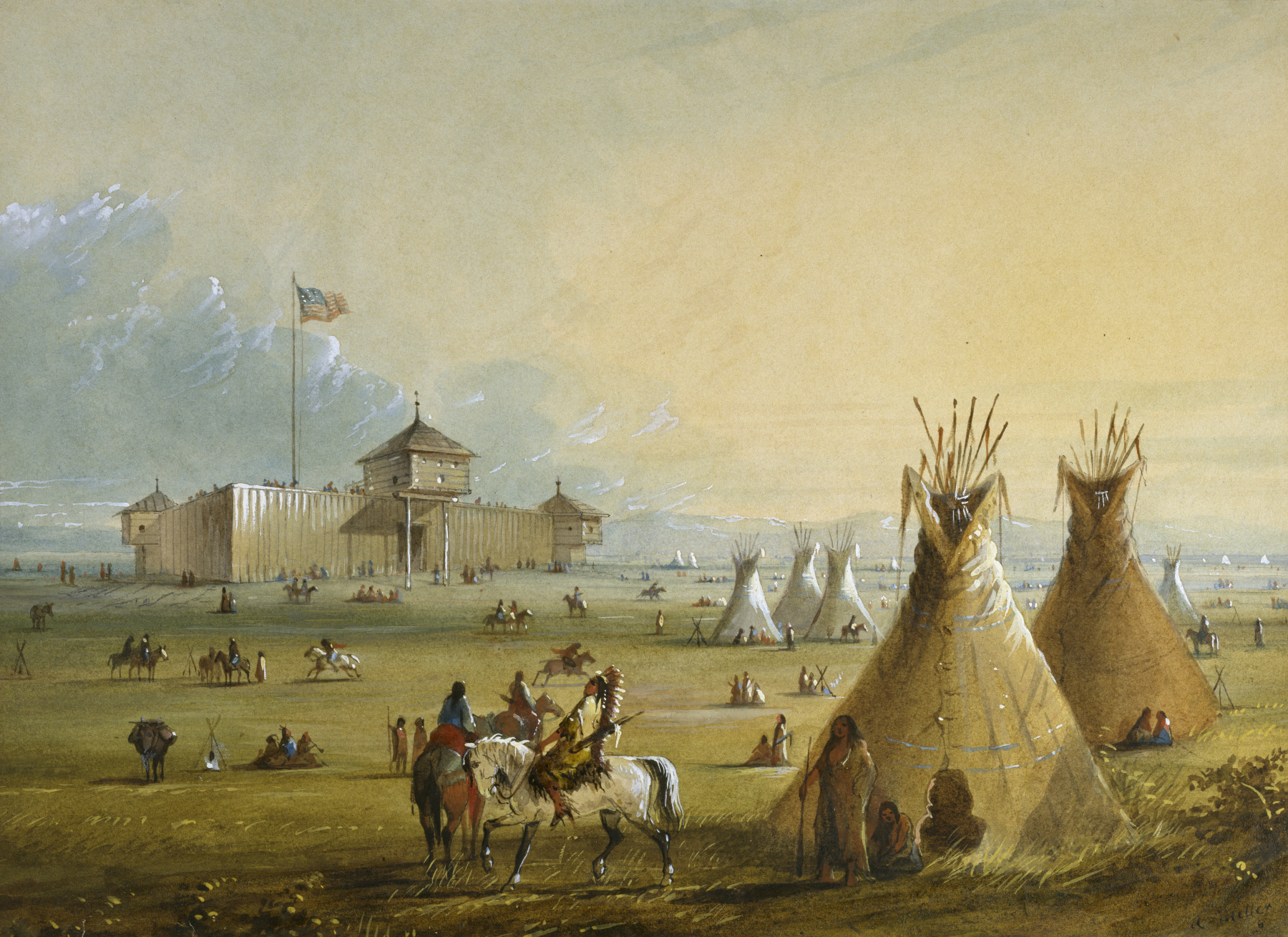
Fort Laramie, 1858–1860, Walters Art Museum

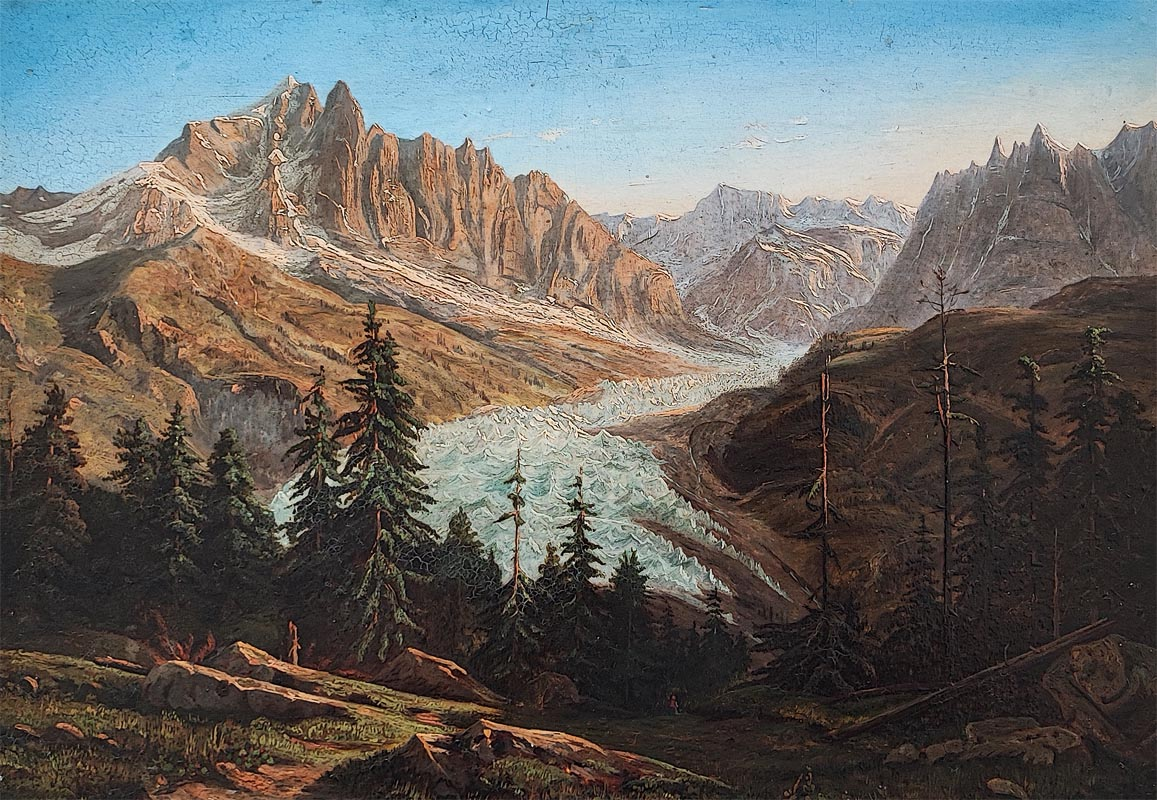
"L' Aiguille du Dru prise du Montenvers"

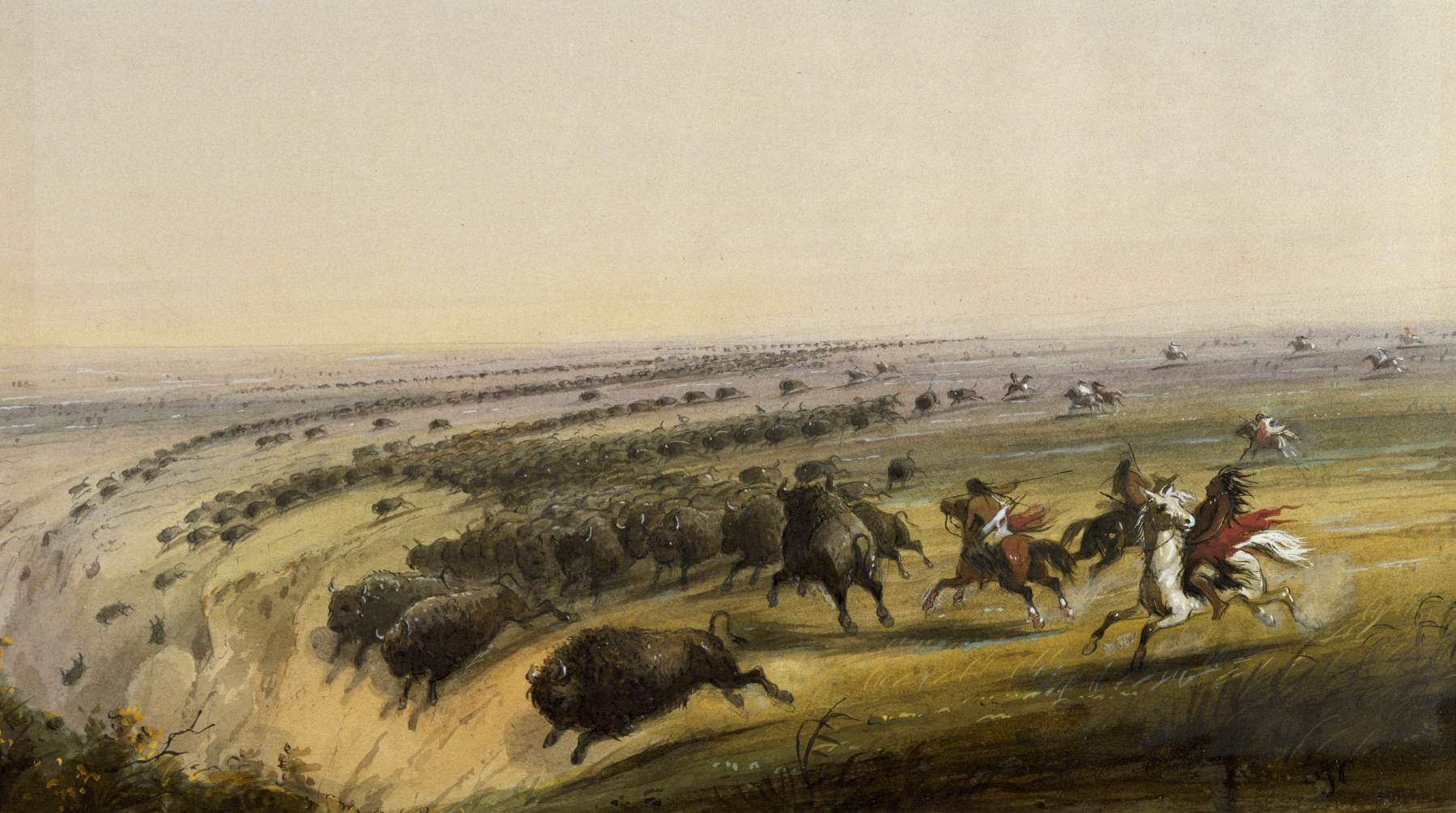
Hunting Buffalo, 1858-1860, Walters Art Museum

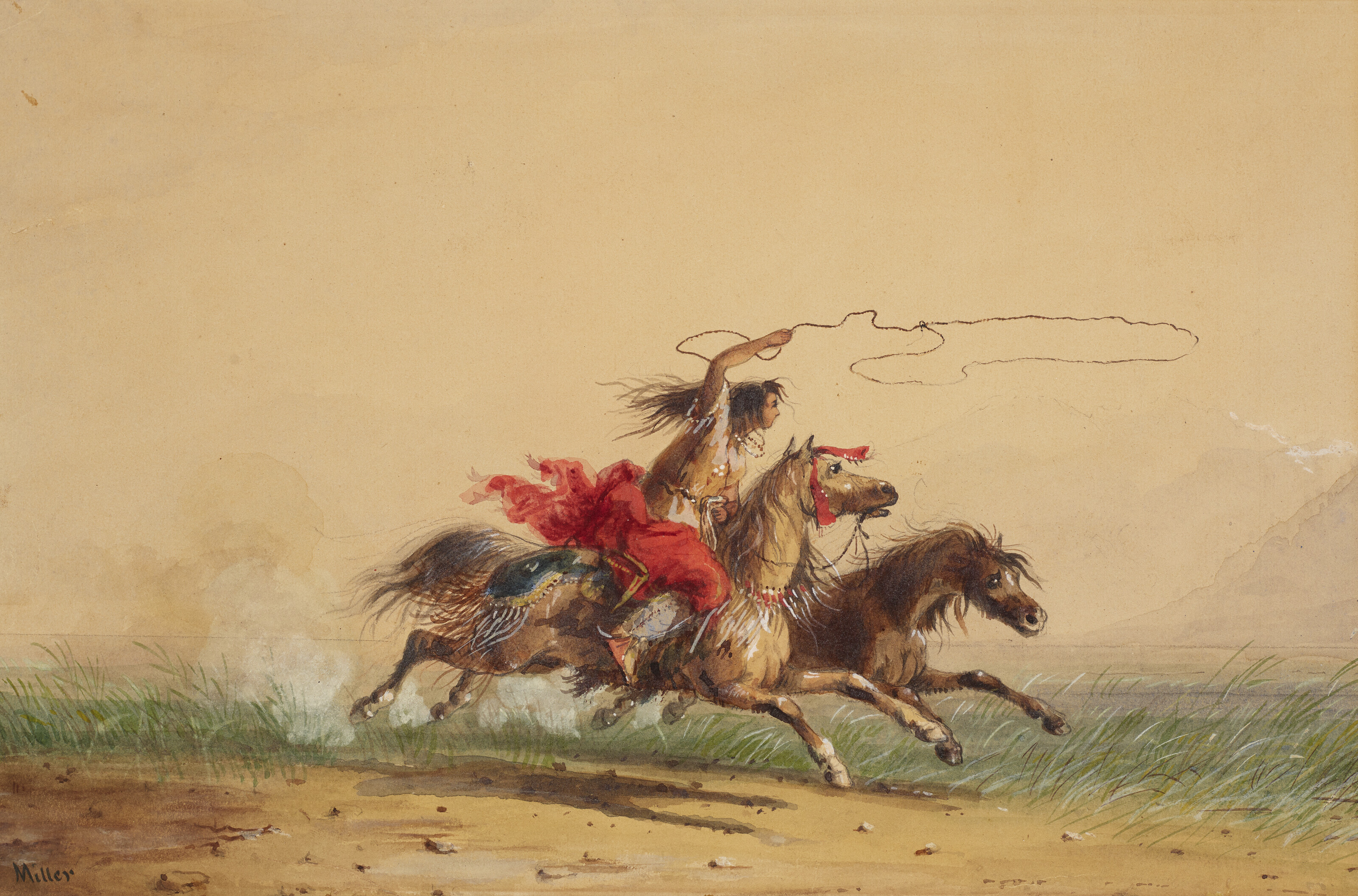
Lassoing Wild Horses

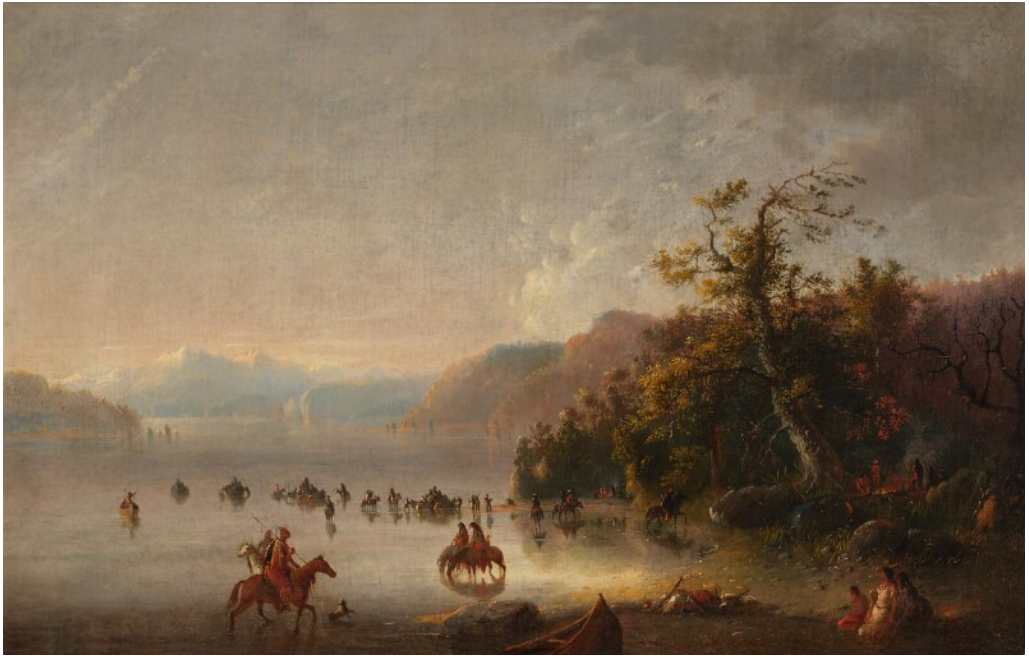
Landscape with Snake Indians

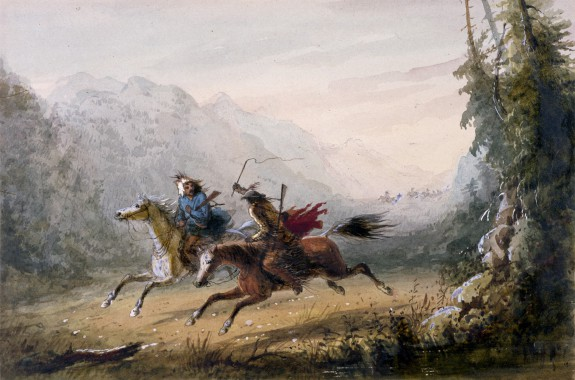
Escape from Blackfeet, Walters Art Museum, 1860

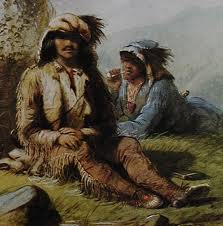
Trapper, depicting Moses "Black" Harris, 1850

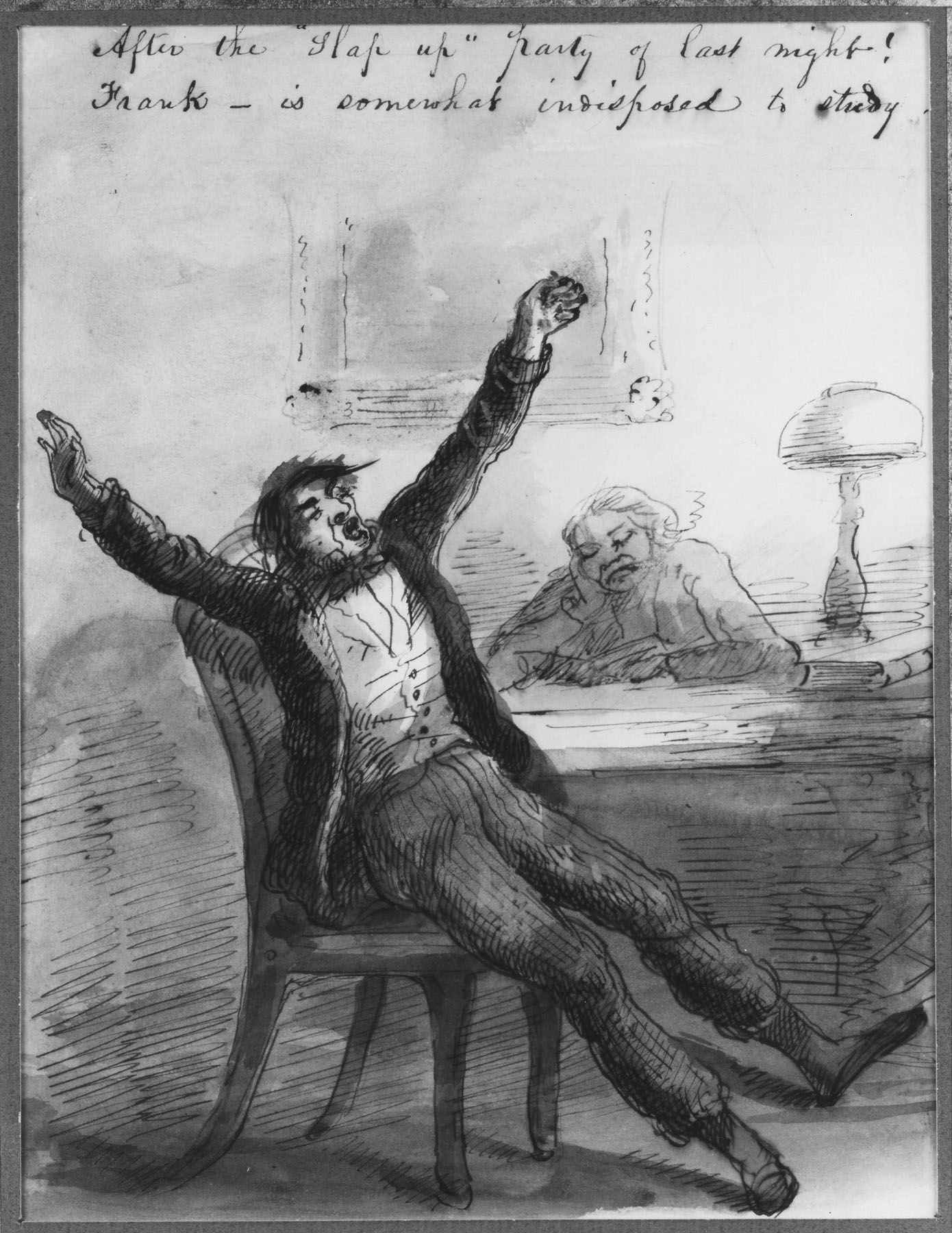
After the "Slap Up" Party of Last Night!, Walters Art Museum

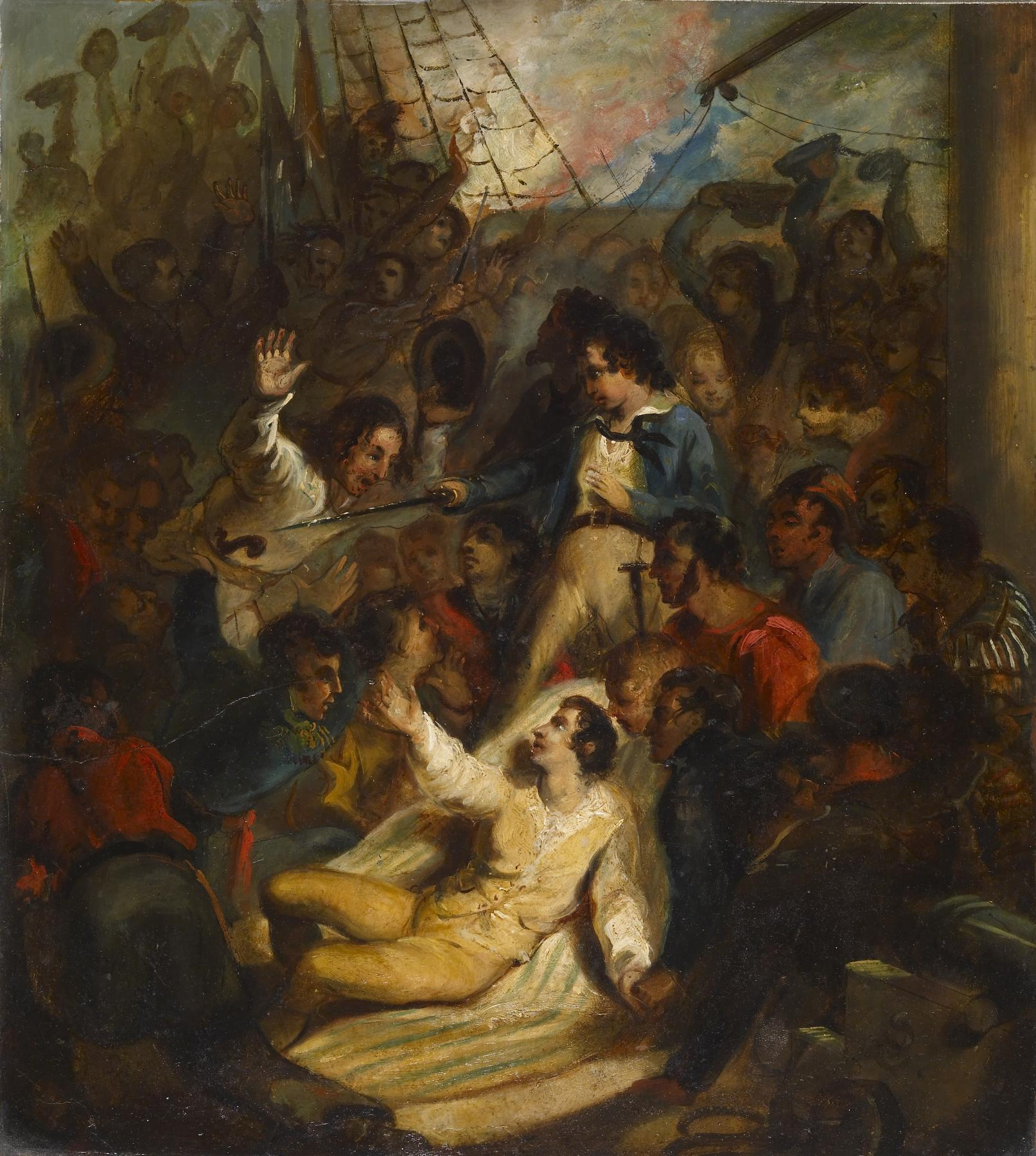
"Don't Give Up That Ship!", a depiction of the death of Captain James Lawrence, circa 1840, Walters Art Museum

7th Baronet of Blair, a depiction of Miller's patron William Drummond Stewart, 1837

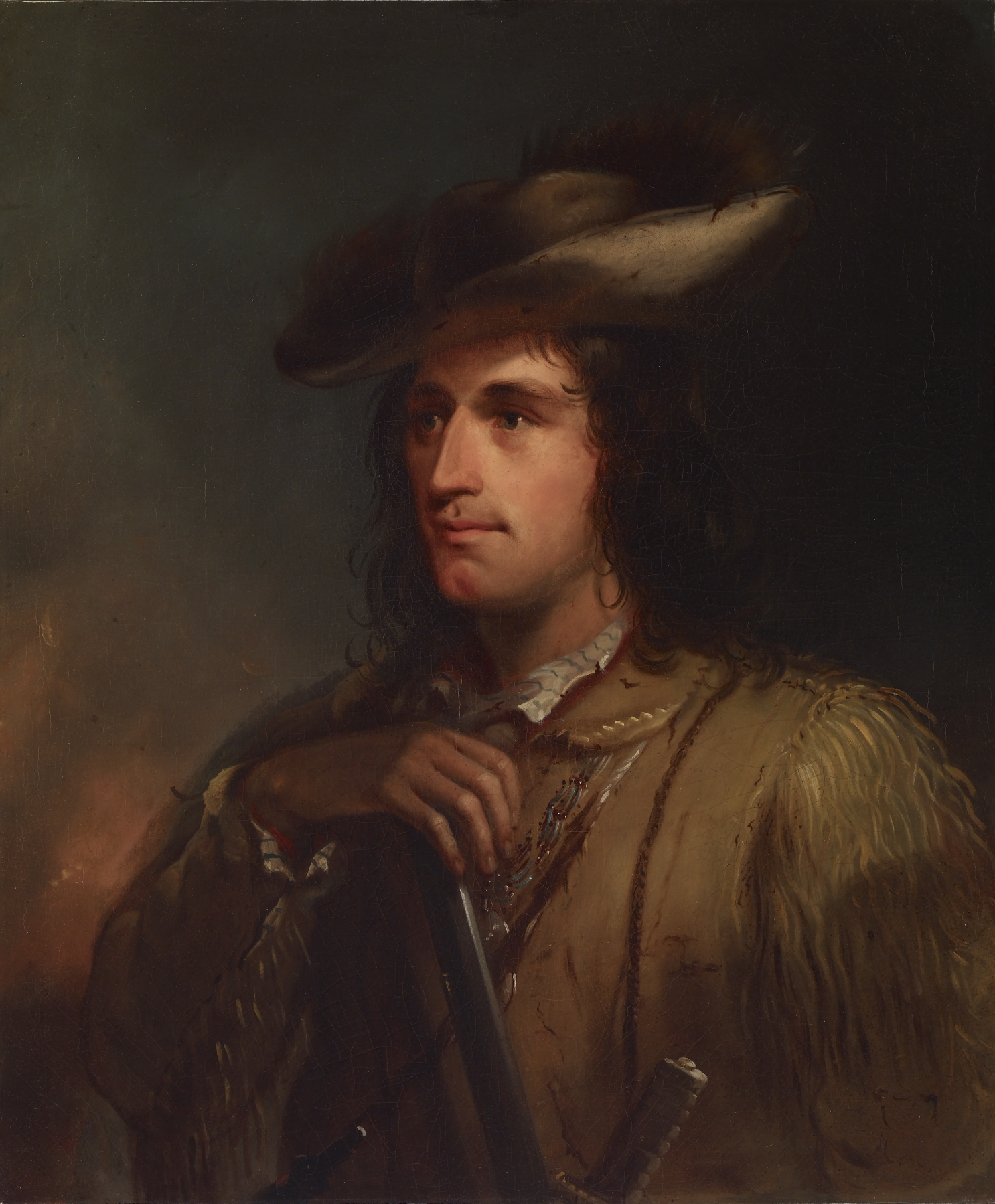
Portrait of Antoine, circa 1840, a depiction of Antoine Clement, Miller's guide during his 1837 expedition with Stewart
