= Reuben Shipley =

Early settler of the Oregon Territory

Reuben Shipley was one of the first Black settlers in the Oregon Territory.

== Early life ==
Reuben Shipley was born in Kentucky between 1800 and 1807. He was enslaved to Robert Shipley. At some point Robert Shipley moved to Missouri and Reuben was brought along; at the time, he was valued at $1,500.

== Later life ==
Reuben was married in Missouri and had two sons. His wife and sons were enslaved 30 miles away on a different plantation. Reuben was permitted to visit them one weekend a month. In Missouri, Reuben was the manager of Robert Shipley's plantation.

Approximately ten years before the American Civil War, in 1853, Robert gave Reuben the option of moving with him to the Oregon Territory or being sold for $1,000. In exchange for helping him move to Oregon and build a home, Robert said he would grant Reuben his freedom. Of course, this meant Reuben would have to leave his family behind, because they were enslaved to a different family. However, he left with the hopes that he could eventually buy his own freedom and the freedom of his wife and sons.

In 1853, Reuben traveled to Oregon, driving an oxen team from Missouri approximately 2,000 miles. When he settled in the Oregon Territory, there may have been as few as 50 Black residents, according to an 1850 census. After helping Robert Shipley move and build his home, Reuben was manumitted. After gaining freedom, Reuben began corresponding with the enslaver of his wife in Missouri, in the hopes that he could gain her freedom, but she died before this was possible. Reuben then hoped to free his enslaved sons, but their enslaver refused Reuben's request and his sons whereabouts were lost during the civil war.

Several years after settling in Oregon, Reuben became a landowner four miles west of Corvallis, Oregon.

He married Mary Jane Holmes in 1857. Mary Jane was also enslaved in Oregon (where slavery was prohibited in 1857). After marrying, Mary's enslaver demanded payment for her freedom, or he would not let her leave the property. Although two locals, Reverend T.J. Connor and Eldridge Hartless, advised against it, Reuben paid the "ransom" the same day, which was between $400-$800. Eventually Reuben and Mary had two sons and a daughter.

In 1861 Reuben Shipley donated land to create Mt Union Cemetery in Philomath, Oregon.

He died in 1872.

== Assumed gravestone discrepancy ==
Though Reuben Shipley was said to have died in 1872 following a visit to Mary Jane's sister, Roxanna in Salem, the circumstances surrounding the name on his gravestone, R. E. Ficklin, gave rise to concern that Shipley's son had donated a headstone with an incorrect name. This was not the case according to the book Breaking Chains: Slavery on Trial in the Oregon Territory. As many enslaved people at the time did, it is believed that Reuben Shipley had used the name of his most recent enslaver, but Shipley had previously been enslaved by a person by the name of Ficklin.

Reuben Shipley's son Edward would take up the last name Ficklin himself despite the majority of the family having gone by the surname Shipley. There is no documentation to verify why or when Shipley's son Edward began using the last name Ficklin.
