= Holmes v. Ford =

1853 freedom suit in Oregon Territory

Holmes v. Ford was an American court case in the Oregon Territory that freed a slave family in the territory in 1853. The decision re-affirmed that slavery was illegal in the territory as outlined in the Organic Laws of Oregon that were continued once the region became a U.S. territory. In the decision, Chief Justice of the Oregon Territorial Supreme Court George H. Williams ruled against Nathaniel Ford, freeing the children of Polly and Robin Holmes.

== Background ==
Robin Holmes was the slave of Nathaniel Ford, a four-term sheriff of Howard County, Missouri and a major landholder there. In 1844, Ford, facing mounting debts, mortgaged Holmes' oldest children, Eliza, Clarisa and William, to another slave owner before migrating to the area of present-day Rickreall in Polk County. Holmes; Holmes' wife, Polly, and their youngest children, Mary Jane, James, and Roxanna, were taken to Oregon, despite the territory's ban on slavery.

In 1850, Ford released Robin and Polly from slavery, keeping four of the Holmes' children and threatening to sell the entire family back to Missouri.

== Case ==
Holmes filed a case against Ford in Polk County, charging that his family was being kept illegally, and requesting a writ of habeas corpus to compel Ford to free the children. Ford waited one year to respond to the summons, claiming the papers had been lost in a coat pocket. In fact, Ford was seeking arrangements to transport the family back to Missouri, as threatened.

Three judges refused Holmes' case, which was brought to court by lawyer Reuben P. Boise. Ford argued that he had freed the Holmes' under the terms of his agreement, having asked Holmes to work for Ford's son digging gold in California and had arranged to house and care for Holmes' wife and children, despite that they were unfit for work. Having now become old enough to work, Ford argued that he should be able to keep them as slaves until the daughters turned 18 and the sons turned 20.

In 1853, George H. Williams was named chief justice of the Territorial Supreme Court, and within weeks ruled against Ford and ordered the children returned to Robin and Polly Holmes. Williams described the case as "the last effort made to hold slaves in Oregon by force of law."

== Legacy ==
This was the last challenge by pro-slavery elements in the territory to retain slavery. Then ten years later during the American Civil War, President Abraham Lincoln signed the Emancipation Proclamation that would lead to the freeing of slaves in the parts of the United States in rebellion. The Thirteenth Amendment officially freed slaves in the remainder of the United States and outlawed slavery.

== See also ==
- American slave court cases
- Slavery in the United States
