= Mary Jane Holmes Shipley Drake =

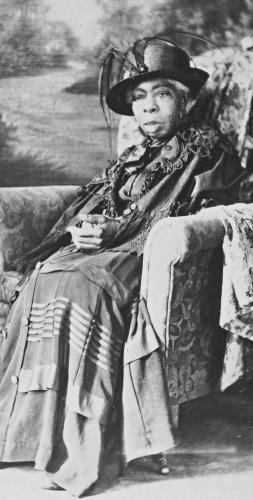
- Born: Mary Jane Holmes; November 29, 1841; Howard County, Missouri
- Died: January 26, 1925 (aged 83); Portland, Oregon
- Spouse: Reuben Shipley

Mary Jane Holmes Shipley Drake was an American slave involved in the Holmes v. Ford case, from which she gained her freedom in 1853.

== Early life ==
Mary Jane Holmes was born in Missouri on November 29, 1841, to Robin and Polly Holmes, along with five other siblings (Eliza, Clarisa, William, James, and Roxanna). The Holmes family was enslaved to farmer Nathaniel Ford, who received them while in office as sheriff of Howard County in Missouri.

== Trial ==
In 1844, Ford moved both his and the Holmes family, including Robin, Polly, the three-year-old Mary Jane, and the younger James and Roxanna, to Oregon, despite the territorial ban on slavery, promising to free them once their affairs were settled. Unfortunately, Ford refused to free the Holmeses for five years, even after his farm was established. After that, Ford did not free the entire family. According to Ford's account, Holmes agreed to work for his son for a year, and upon his return, would free him, Polly, and their infant son. Ford additionally said that Holmes agreed to leave his other three children in the care of Ford as "wards" to recompense for his support of the family in the years before. Holmes denied any such agreement and claimed Ford held his children as slaves and threatened to sell them back to Missouri under the Fugitive Slave Act. Publication of one of Ford's letters in 1930 later proved this to be true.

After Ford refused to release the Holmes' children, on April 16, 1852, Mary Jane's parents filed a lawsuit against him in order to regain custody of their other four children. During the length of a tedious a 15-month trial, the case made its way to the Oregon Territory Supreme Court. through lower courts and finally reached the bench of Chief Justice George A. Williams of the Oregon Territory Supreme Court. On July 13, 1853, Williams ruled the Holmes children free.

== Later life ==
Mary Jane Holmes chose to remain with the Ford family, acting as a servant for a further four years in order to provide income for her parents, who had taken their other children, and moved to Marion County, where they owned a successful plant nursery. In 1857, when she was sixteen and wanted to marry, Ford demanded that the groom, Reuben Shipley (or Reuben Ficklin, depending on the source), pay him seven hundred and fifty dollars to be able wed Mary Jane, even though she had been legally released from his ownership by the Territorial Supreme Court four years earlier. Shipley, however, did not want to repeat the process, and agreed to pay the $750.

Ruben and Mary Jane married and later bought an 80-acre (32 ha) farm near Corvallis, Oregon. They eventually had six children and became respected members of their community. After Ruben's death, Mary Jane married R.G. Drake in 1875. She died on 26 January 1925, having outlived both husbands, and all but one of her children.

== See also ==
- American slave court cases
- Slavery in the United States
- African-American women
