= Nathaniel Ford =

American politician

Member of the Oregon Territorial Legislature
- In office 1856–1858
- Constituency: Polk County

Personal details
- Born: 1795 Missouri
- Died: January 9, 1870 (aged 74–75) Dixie, Oregon
- Spouse: Lucinda
- Occupation: farmer, sheriff

Nathaniel Ford (c. 1795 – January 9, 1870) was an American politician and Oregon pioneer during the time of the Oregon Territory. A native of Missouri, he worked as a sheriff in that state before moving to the Oregon Country where he was selected as judge in the Provisional Government of Oregon and served in the Oregon Territorial Legislature. Ford also lost a civil case that freed his slaves whom he had brought across the Oregon Trail from Missouri.

== Early life ==
Nathaniel "Nat" Ford grew up in Missouri. Born around 1795, Ford worked in Missouri at a number of different occupations. He was a county sheriff, school teacher, surveyor, and a flatboatman. As sheriff of Howard County in Missouri, Ford acquired the Holmes family as slaves, as slavery was still legal in that state at the time.

== Oregon ==
Colonel Ford arrived in Oregon in 1844 from Missouri on the Oregon Trail. In his wagon train he was called Colonel Ford as he was the second in command of the large group of pioneers. Part of this same party included fellow future Willamette Valley politician John Minto, however Ford was in charge of a different company. On this journey across the west Ford brought with him three slaves to help him build the family farm.

Once in Oregon, Ford began farming in Polk County, five miles (8 km) from a place called Nesmith's Mills. Later he served as the first postmaster at Rickreall.

=== Slavery ===
In 1844, before leaving Missouri, Ford promised his slaves Polly and Robin Holmes that he would free them after reaching Oregon and establishing a farm. However, Ford did not keep this promise and only years later did he agree to free any of the family. Finally, in 1852, Robin Holmes sued Ford in court, Holmes v. Ford, to free his family, as slavery was illegal in the territory. Eleven months later the new chief justice of the supreme court arrived and the case was heard July 13, 1854. Judge Williams freed the family, but never mentioned slavery in his decision.

== Politics ==
During the provisional government time in the Oregon Country, Ford was selected by the Provisional Legislature to be the Supreme Judge of Oregon in 1845, but Ford declined to serve. Years later in 1856 he was elected to the Territorial Legislature to represent Polk and Tillamook Counties. The following two years he was again elected, but representing other counties in addition to Polk County. During this time he served in the upper chamber, called the council, as a Democrat. 1858 was the last year of the Territorial Legislature, and Ford's last term as the following year Oregon became a state and the Council became the Oregon Senate.

== Family ==
Ford's wife Lucinda and the rest of the family were members of the Rickreall church in Polk County. This family included a daughter named Lucinda. Nathaniel died in Dixie (aka Rickreall) in Polk County at the age of 75 years on January 9, 1870, with his wife dying a few years later on January 4, 1874. The family is buried along with other pioneer families at Burch Pioneer Cemetery in Polk County.
