= National Register of Historic Places listings in Washington County, Oregon =

Location of Washington County in Oregon

This list presents the full set of buildings, structures, objects, sites, or districts designated on the National Register of Historic Places in Washington County, Oregon, United States, and offers brief descriptive information about each of them. The National Register recognizes places of national, state, or local historic significance across the United States. Out of over 90,000 National Register sites nationwide, Oregon is home to over 2,000, and 51 of those are found in Washington County.

This National Park Service list is complete through NPS recent listings posted July 11, 2025.

== Current listings ==
	Name on the Register	Image	Date listed	Location	City or town	Description
1	Aloha Farmhouse	Aloha Farmhouse	September 30, 2014 (#14000812)	1080 SW 197th Avenue; 45°30′43″N 122°52′45″W	Beaverton	Pietro Belluschi (1899–1994), Oregon's highest-regarded architect of the 20th century, lived in this then-isolated house from 1944 to 1948 during one of the most productive periods of his career. His renovations to the house reflect his ideas in the Northwest Regional style that he helped develop.
2	Beaverton Downtown Historic District	Beaverton Downtown Historic District	January 7, 1986 (#86000037)	Roughly bounded by SW Canyon Road and SW East, Washington, 2nd, and Watson Streets; 45°29′15″N 122°48′20″W	Beaverton	Beaverton's downtown commercial core remains largely intact as a pedestrian-oriented business district constructed along the street pattern from the city's earliest plats. Significant buildings include a handful from the city's first decades (1868–1920) and a larger number from the period of profound transformation between the world wars (1920–1940).
3	Silas Jacob N. Beeks House	Silas Jacob N. Beeks House	June 14, 1984 (#84003100)	3869 NW Martin Road; 45°32′53″N 123°04′28″W	Forest Grove vicinity	
4	Stephen and Parthena M. Blank House	Stephen and Parthena M. Blank House	July 14, 1988 (#88001035)	2117 A Street; 45°31′17″N 123°06′49″W	Forest Grove	Built c. 1858, this house is a prominent example of mid-19th century Greek Revival architecture in Forest Grove. It also exhibits a mix of frame construction techniques of the period. It was relocated a short distance in 1895, and may have been used as a stagecoach inn about that time.
5	M. E. Blanton House	M. E. Blanton House	March 2, 1989 (#89000123)	3980 SW 170th Avenue; 45°29′28″N 122°51′05″W	Beaverton vicinity	This 1912 house, built during the early stages of the suburbanization of the area, is an unusually large and well-preserved example of the Craftsman architecture of the period. The design details, both exterior and interior, are exceptionally intact and richly express the Craftsman style.
6	Clark Historic District	Clark Historic District	June 1, 2002 (#02000617)	Roughly bounded by 18th and 16th Avenues, A and Elm Streets; 45°30′57″N 123°06′33″W	Forest Grove	
7	Benjamin Cornelius Jr. House	Benjamin Cornelius Jr. House	July 14, 1988 (#88001034)	2314 19th Avenue; 45°31′05″N 123°06′21″W	Forest Grove	This architecturally-important house was built c. 1873 by carpenter Harley McDonald, one of the first settlers to offer architectural services in Oregon, and is one of only two houses designed by McDonald remaining in Forest Grove. (Note: The other remaining home by McDonald in Forest Grove is the similar James D. Robb House.) Its Italianate form and Gothic details are highly distinctive in the local area.
8	Harry A. Crosley House	Harry A. Crosley House	September 9, 1993 (#93000919)	2125 A Street; 45°31′17″N 123°06′50″W	Forest Grove	
9	Doriot–Rider Log House	Doriot–Rider Log House	June 25, 2008 (#08000554)	14850 SW 132nd Terrace; 45°24′46″N 122°48′44″W	Tigard	
10	Dundee Lodge	Dundee Lodge	June 6, 1985 (#85001186)	South Road; 45°27′34″N 123°11′57″W	Gaston vicinity	
11	Augustus Fanno Farmhouse	Augustus Fanno Farmhouse	April 5, 1984 (#84003103)	8405 SW Creekside Place; 45°27′32″N 122°47′36″W	Beaverton	After emigrating across the Oregon Trail in 1846, Augustus Fanno settled this land claim — the twelfth claim filed at the Oregon City Land Office and the first in what is now Washington County. Fanno built the New England-style farmhouse with neoclassical details in 1859. The farm continued in productive operation until the 1940s, and the family occupied the house until the 1970s.
12	Adam and Johanna Feldman House	Adam and Johanna Feldman House	February 11, 1993 (#93000013)	8808 SW Rambler Lane; 45°28′03″N 122°46′03″W	Portland	
13	First Church of Christ Scientist	First Church of Christ Scientist	January 21, 1994 (#93001505)	1904 Pacific Avenue; 45°31′11″N 123°06′49″W	Forest Grove	
14	Fogelbo House	Fogelbo House	July 15, 2020 (#100005343)	8740 SW Oleson Road; 45°27′24″N 122°46′00″W	Portland	
15	Forest Grove Downtown Historic District	Forest Grove Downtown Historic District	October 26, 2020 (#100005727)	Roughly bounded by one parcel north of 21st Avenue, Ash, 19th, and A Streets; 45°31′11″N 123°06′44″W	Forest Grove	
16	Imbrie Farm	Imbrie Farm	February 15, 1977 (#77001117)	4045 NE Cornelius Pass Road; 45°32′57″N 122°54′02″W	Hillsboro	This former farm with buildings dating to 1855 includes an Italian Villa style home, an eight-sided barn, a shed, and several other out-buildings. In 1986, the McMenamins chain bought the farm and converted it into the Cornelius Pass Roadhouse brewpub, which added Imbrie Hall constructed from timbers from Henry Weinhard's Brewery.
17	Belle Ainsworth Jenkins Estate	Belle Ainsworth Jenkins Estate	November 28, 1978 (#78002327)	8005 SW Grabhorn Road; 45°27′37″N 122°53′29″W	Beaverton	Ralph and Belle Jenkins began construction on this 68-acre (28 ha) estate in 1912 as an escape from the city. They included fine equestrian facilities, as well as gardens, a greenhouse, an ornamental pool, a tea house, a carriage house, and a water tower. After the Jenkinses died the property changed hands several times, and was finally acquired as a public park in 1976.
18	Zula Linklater House	Zula Linklater House	August 1, 1984 (#84003108)	230 NE 2nd Avenue; 45°31′28″N 122°59′16″W	Hillsboro	This Mediterranean style office building in downtown was oringally a residence. Completed in 1923, it was converted into office space in 1984. The structure is built of concrete, wood, and stucco.
19	Isaac Macrum House	Isaac Macrum House	August 28, 1998 (#98001120)	2225 12th Avenue; 45°30′39″N 123°06′29″W	Forest Grove	
20	Manning–Kamna Farm	Manning–Kamna Farm	October 10, 2007 (#07001077)	29375 Evergreen Road; 45°33′02″N 122°58′45″W	Hillsboro	The oldest of ten buildings on this farm is the cross-wing western farmhouse that was completed in 1883. Other buildings include a two-story barn, a privy, a woodshed, and a chicken coop, amongst other structures. The farm was settled in the 1850s, with the newest building a garage completed in the 1920s.
21	Andrew Jackson and Sarah Jane Masters House	Andrew Jackson and Sarah Jane Masters House	September 17, 2015 (#15000615)	20650 SW Kinnaman Road; 45°29′20″N 122°53′23″W	Aloha	
22	Malcolm McDonald House	Malcolm McDonald House	January 14, 2015 (#14001160)	7250 Northeast Birch Street; 45°31′39″N 122°54′17″W	Hillsboro	
23	C. W. Mertz Rental House #2	C. W. Mertz Rental House #2	August 10, 2005 (#05000852)	1933 16th Avenue; 45°30′52″N 123°06′48″W	Forest Grove	
24	Thomas Michos House	Thomas Michos House	October 17, 1991 (#91001552)	4400 SW Scholls Ferry Road; 45°29′19″N 122°44′46″W	Portland	
25	Oak Hills Historic District	Oak Hills Historic District	July 10, 2013 (#13000482)	Roughly bounded by NW. West Union & Cornell Rds., NW 143rd Ave., Bethany Blvd. 45°32′20″N 122°49′57″W	Beaverton vicinity	
26	Old Scotch Church	Old Scotch Church	November 5, 1974 (#74001723)	Scotch Church Road; 45°34′22″N 122°59′40″W	Hillsboro	The Carpenter Gothic-style building was completed in 1878, and expanded in 1905. More expansion occurred in 1940, 1955, 1960, and 1984, including the first indoor restrooms in 1955. The cemetery on the grounds holds the graves of church members as well as local pioneer settlers of the Tualatin Plains, including Joseph Meek.
27	Ole and Polly Oleson Farmhouse	Ole and Polly Oleson Farmhouse	February 22, 1991 (#91000140)	5430 SW Ames Way; 45°28′51″N 122°44′49″W	Portland vicinity	
28	Painter's Woods Historic District	Painter's Woods Historic District	May 28, 2009 (#09000360)	Centered on 15th Avenue and Birch Street, including portions of 12th, 13th, and 14th Avenues, and Cedar and Douglas Streets; 45°30′45″N 123°06′30″W	Forest Grove	This residential area was the earliest modern subdivision addition to Forest Grove, and represents the town's transition from an agrarian community to a small-urban center. The district includes well-preserved examples of a broad range of architectural styles in currency between 1880 and 1948.
29	John and Elsie Parsons House	John and Elsie Parsons House	August 10, 2005 (#05000853)	1825 Mountain View Lane; 45°31′04″N 123°04′33″W	Forest Grove	
30	Portland Golf Club Clubhouse and Golf Course	Portland Golf Club Clubhouse and Golf Course	February 24, 2023 (#100007088)	5900 SW Scholls Ferry Rd. 45°28′40″N 122°45′47″W	Portland vicinity	
31	Harold Wass Ray House	Harold Wass Ray House	January 21, 1994 (#93001504)	5611 NE Elam Young Parkway; 45°31′51″N 122°55′20″W	Hillsboro	Designed by Charles W. Ertz, the two-story home was completed in 1935. The Prairie School and Craftsman in style house sits on what was Hawthorn Farm, that later became one of Intel Corporation's campuses. The namesake had made his money from his cannery that became part of Birdseye Frozen Foods.
32	Richard and Helen Rice House	Richard and Helen Rice House	November 29, 2006 (#06001096)	26385 NW Groveland Drive; 45°34′29″N 122°56′54″W	Hillsboro	The 1952 home is the main part of the Rice Northwest Museum of Rocks and Minerals. It was the first ranch style home listed on the National Register of Historic Places in Oregon. The William F. Wayman-designed house was built of Arizona flagstone on the exterior and wood native to Oregon, including curly maple and myrtlewood. The 7,500 square feet (700 m^{2}) home includes an elevator to the basement.
33	Rice–Gates House	Rice–Gates House	September 8, 1980 (#80003391)	308 SE Walnut Street; 45°31′03″N 122°59′10″W	Hillsboro	This Second Empire style residence has a mansard roof with diamond shaped shingles. The roof features a boxed cornice, Gable fronted dormers, and eaves with paired brackets. This 1890 structure has windows topped with an arch, plus include a pediment above each window. A former owner, Harry V. Gates, was a state legislator.
34	James D. Robb House	James D. Robb House	July 14, 1988 (#88001033)	2606 17th Avenue; 45°30′57″N 123°06′03″W	Forest Grove	
35	Schanen–Zolling House	Schanen–Zolling House	December 10, 1985 (#85003340)	6750 SW Oleson Road; 45°28′15″N 122°44′57″W	Portland	
36	Edward Schulmerich House	Edward Schulmerich House	February 28, 1991 (#91000050)	614 E Main Street; 45°31′21″N 122°58′49″W	Hillsboro	Completed in 1915, this two-story home in downtown Hillsboro was built for state senator Edward Schulmerich. He was a local merchant who was inspired by Craftsman architecture after a trip to Pasadena, California. The Airplane Bungalow-style house includes a wraparound porch.
37	Shaver–Bilyeu House	Shaver–Bilyeu House	February 11, 1993 (#93000014)	16445 SW 92nd Avenue; 45°24′04″N 122°46′17″W	Tigard	
38	Albert S. Sholes House	Albert S. Sholes House	September 2, 1982 (#82003755)	1599 S Alpine Street; 45°31′09″N 123°03′08″W	Cornelius	
39	Charles Shorey House	Charles Shorey House	June 16, 1989 (#89000518)	905 E Main Street; 45°31′20″N 122°58′31″W	Hillsboro	Completed about 1908, the house is situated on land that was once part of a dairy farm. This Queen Anne style structure is a cross-shaped structure featuring the mixture of both a gambrel roof and a gable roof. The two-story home also has features of the Colonial Revival style.
40	Shute–Meierjurgen Farmstead	Shute–Meierjurgen Farmstead	July 6, 2018 (#100002647)	4825 NE Starr Boulevard; 45°33′19″N 122°56′14″W	Hillsboro vicinity	
41	Alvin T. Smith House	Alvin T. Smith House	November 8, 1974 (#74001721)	S Elm Street; 45°30′16″N 123°06′15″W	Forest Grove vicinity	
42	John Sweek House	John Sweek House	November 8, 1974 (#74001724)	18815 SW Boones Ferry Road; 45°23′03″N 122°45′54″W	Tualatin	
43	Dr. W. R. and Eunice Taylor House	Dr. W. R. and Eunice Taylor House	August 10, 2005 (#05000851)	2212 A Street; 45°31′21″N 123°06′50″W	Forest Grove	
44	John W. Tigard House	John W. Tigard House	July 20, 1979 (#79003739)	10310 SW Canterbury Lane; 45°24′53″N 122°47′00″W	Tigard	
45	Tualatin Academy	Tualatin Academy	February 12, 1974 (#74001722)	2043 College Way; 45°31′13″N 123°06′39″W	Forest Grove	This c. 1850 Colonial Revival building was the earliest home of what grew into Pacific University. Tracing its earliest roots to an orphanage operated by Tabitha Moffatt Brown and Harvey L. Clark, Tualatin Academy received its official charter in 1849 as the first act of the Oregon Territorial Legislature. Renamed as Old College Hall in 1949, it is the oldest educational building in the West.
46	J. S. and Melinda Waggener Farmstead	J. S. and Melinda Waggener Farmstead	July 25, 2003 (#03000693)	34680 SW Firdale Road; 45°26′37″N 123°02′29″W	Cornelius	
47	Walker Naylor Historic District	Walker Naylor Historic District	March 3, 2011 (#11000155)	Gayles Way, Covey Run Dr., A St., and 21st Ave. 45°31′23″N 123°06′56″W	Forest Grove	
48	J. F. Watkins House	J. F. Watkins House	May 27, 1993 (#93000448)	5419 SW Scholls Ferry Road; 45°28′51″N 122°45′36″W	Portland	
49	West Union Baptist Church	West Union Baptist Church	July 10, 1974 (#74001725)	West Union Road; 45°34′25″N 122°54′24″W	West Union	Built in 1853, this is the oldest Baptist church building in Oregon, and one of the earliest surviving pioneer churches in the state. The West Union congregation, organized in 1844, was the first Baptist church west of the Rocky Mountains.
50	Woods and Caples General Store	Woods and Caples General Store	December 2, 1985 (#85003028)	2020 Main Street; 45°31′12″N 123°06′44″W	Forest Grove	
51	John Quincy Adams and Elizabeth Young House	John Quincy Adams and Elizabeth Young House	December 31, 2008 (#08001264)	12050 NW Cornell Road; 45°31′36″N 122°48′03″W	Portland vicinity	The Young family settled in this saltbox house in the 1860s when they acquired an interest in a nearby lumber mill, which became central to the local Cedar Mill community. In 1874, John Young opened Cedar Mill's first general store and post office in the house, which lasted until 1881. The house is the oldest remaining structure in Cedar Mill.

== Former listings ==
	Name on the Register	Image	Date listed	Date removed	Location	City or town	Description
1	Washington County Jail	Washington County Jail	July 31, 1986 (#86002090)	December 24, 2008	872 NE 28th Avenue (former); 45°31′36″N 122°48′03″W	Hillsboro	Part or all of the jail building was moved to the Washington County Museum.

== See also ==
- National Register of Historic Places listings in Oregon
- Listings in neighboring counties: Clackamas, Columbia, Multnomah, Tillamook, Yamhill
- Historic preservation
- History of Oregon
- Lists of Oregon-related topics
