= Painter's Woods Historic District =

Historic district in Oregon, United States

- U.S. National Register of Historic Places
- U.S. Historic district
- Location within Oregon Location within the United States
- Location: Forest Grove, Oregon, centered on 15th Ave. and Birch Sts., including portions of 14th, 13th, 12th Aves., Cedar and Douglas Sts.
- Coordinates: 45°30′45″N 123°06′30″W
- Area: 26.5 acres (10.7 ha)
- Architectural style: Late 19th And 20th Century Revivals, Late 19th And Early 20th Century American Movements
- NRHP reference No.: 09000360
- Added to NRHP: May 28, 2009

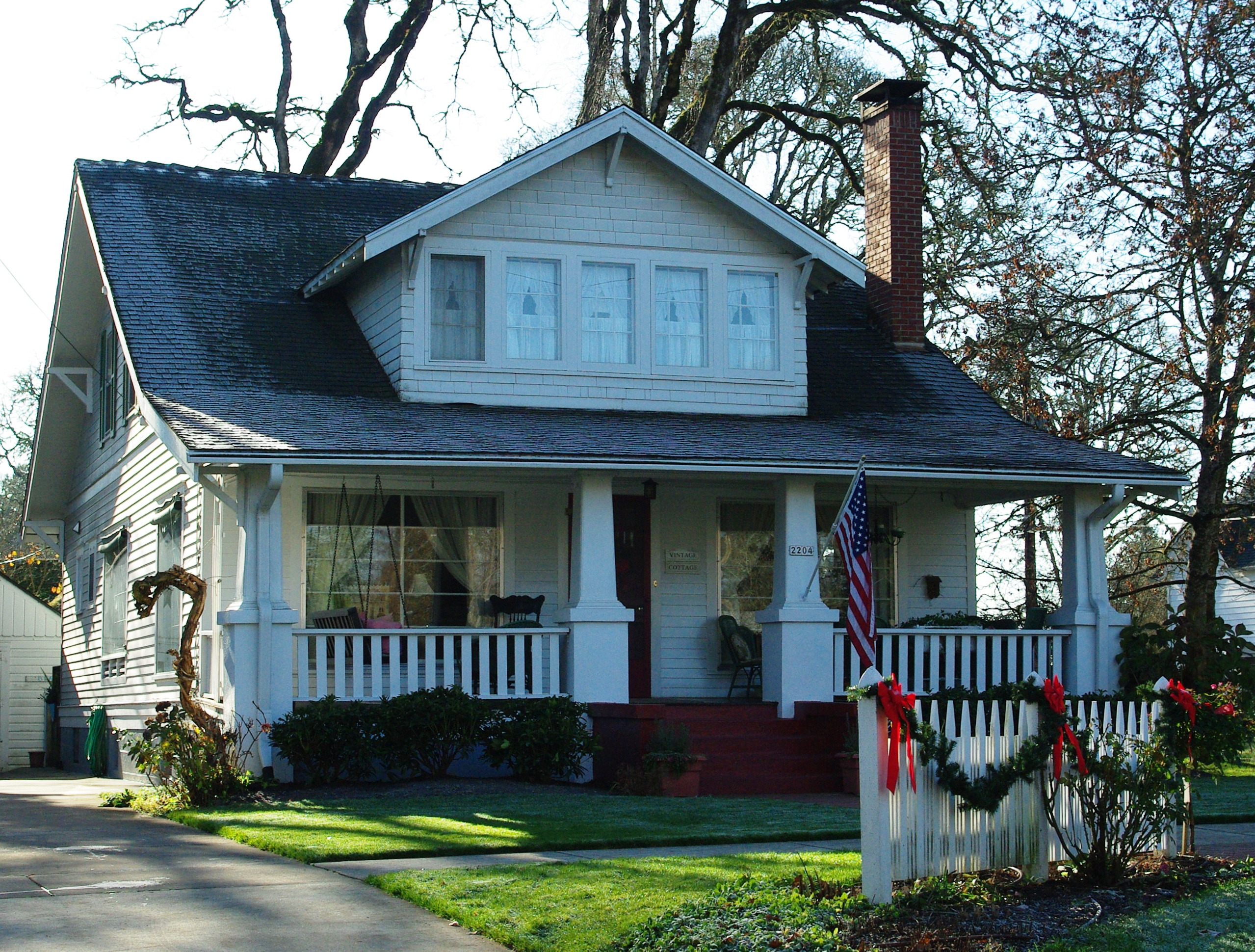
Home in the Painter's Woods Historic District

The Painter's Woods Historic District, located in Forest Grove, Oregon, is listed on the National Register of Historic Places. Painter's Woods includes the earliest modern subdivision addition to Forest Grove, and represents Forest Grove's transition from a largely agrarian community to a small-urban center of commerce and education. Subsequent construction reflected the ebbs and flows of development in Forest Grove over time. Primarily residential in character, the district includes well-preserved examples of a broad range of architectural styles in currency between 1880 and 1948. It is adjacent to the Clark Historic District.

== See also ==
- National Register of Historic Places listings in Washington County, Oregon
