= C. W. Mertz Rental House No. 2 =

United States historic place

- U.S. National Register of Historic Places
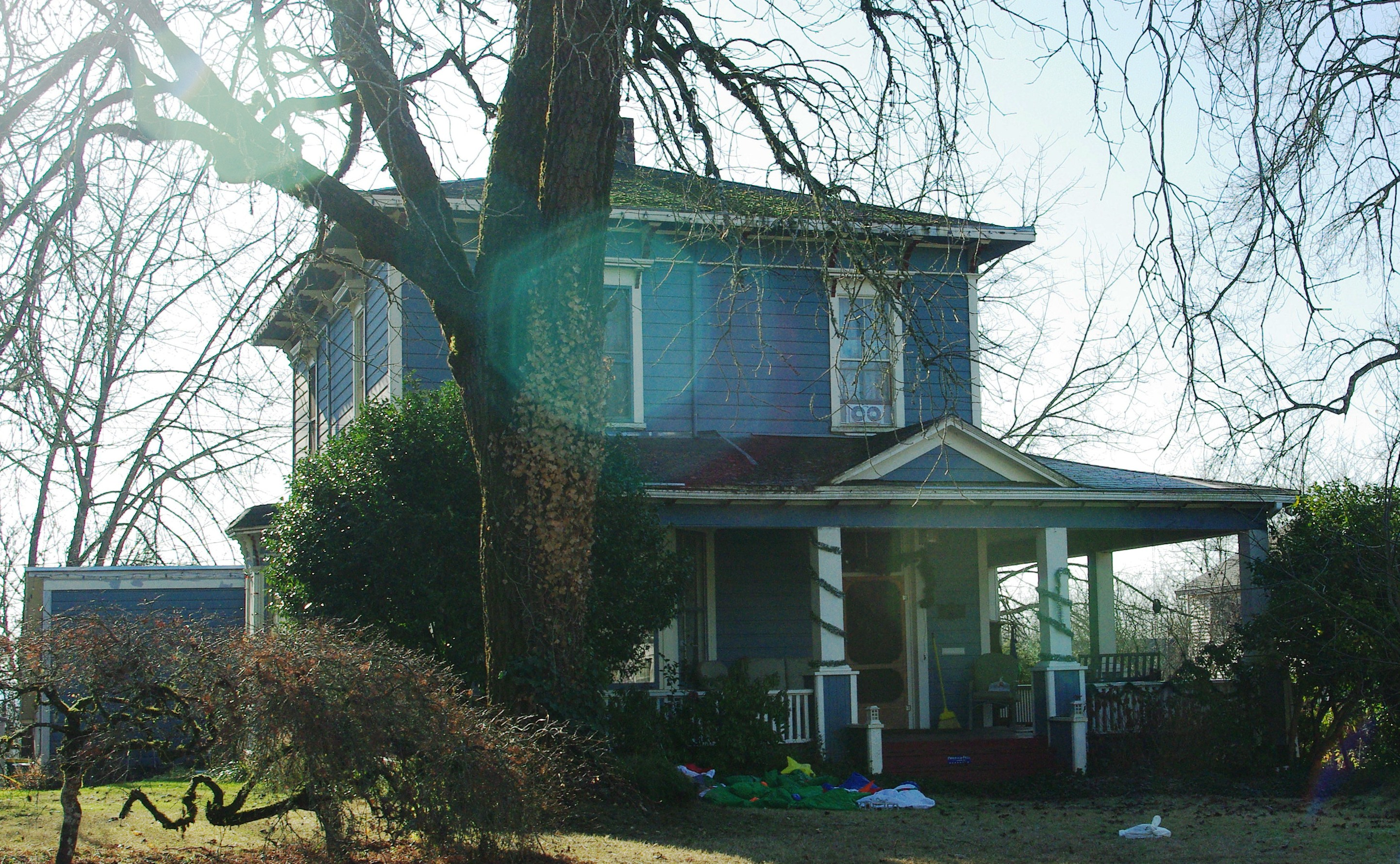
- The house in December 2009

- Location within Oregon Location within the United States
- Location: 1933 16th Avenue, Forest Grove, Oregon
- Coordinates: 45°30′52″N 123°06′48″W
- Built: 1925
- Built by: John Taylor
- Architectural style: Late Gothic Revival
- NRHP reference No.: 14001160
- Added to NRHP: 2015

C. W. Mertz Rental House No. 2 is a building in Forest Grove, Oregon that was listed on the National Register of Historic Places on June 21, 2005. It was built by architect John Taylor. It is a contributing property within the Clark Historic District.

The house is notable for being built of hollow concrete walls, a process developed by John Taylor. The Taylor Process Hollow Concrete Wall system had two concrete walls with a continuous air space between them. Taylor filed a patent for the mold that was used to build the walls. As the walls were built up vertically from a concrete foundation, reinforcing ties were added between the double walls. When the specified height was reached, the top was closed with a suitable cap. The exterior walls could be finished with any adaptable finish, but stucco was the most common method. The Zula Linklater House in Hillsboro was also built using this construction method. About a dozen buildings in Forest Grove, and a few outside the city, were constructed using Taylor's double-wall method.

== See also ==
- National Register of Historic Places listings in Washington County, Oregon
