= Thomas Michos House =

Historic house in Oregon, United States

Coordinates: 45°29′19″N 122°44′44″W

- U.S. National Register of Historic Places
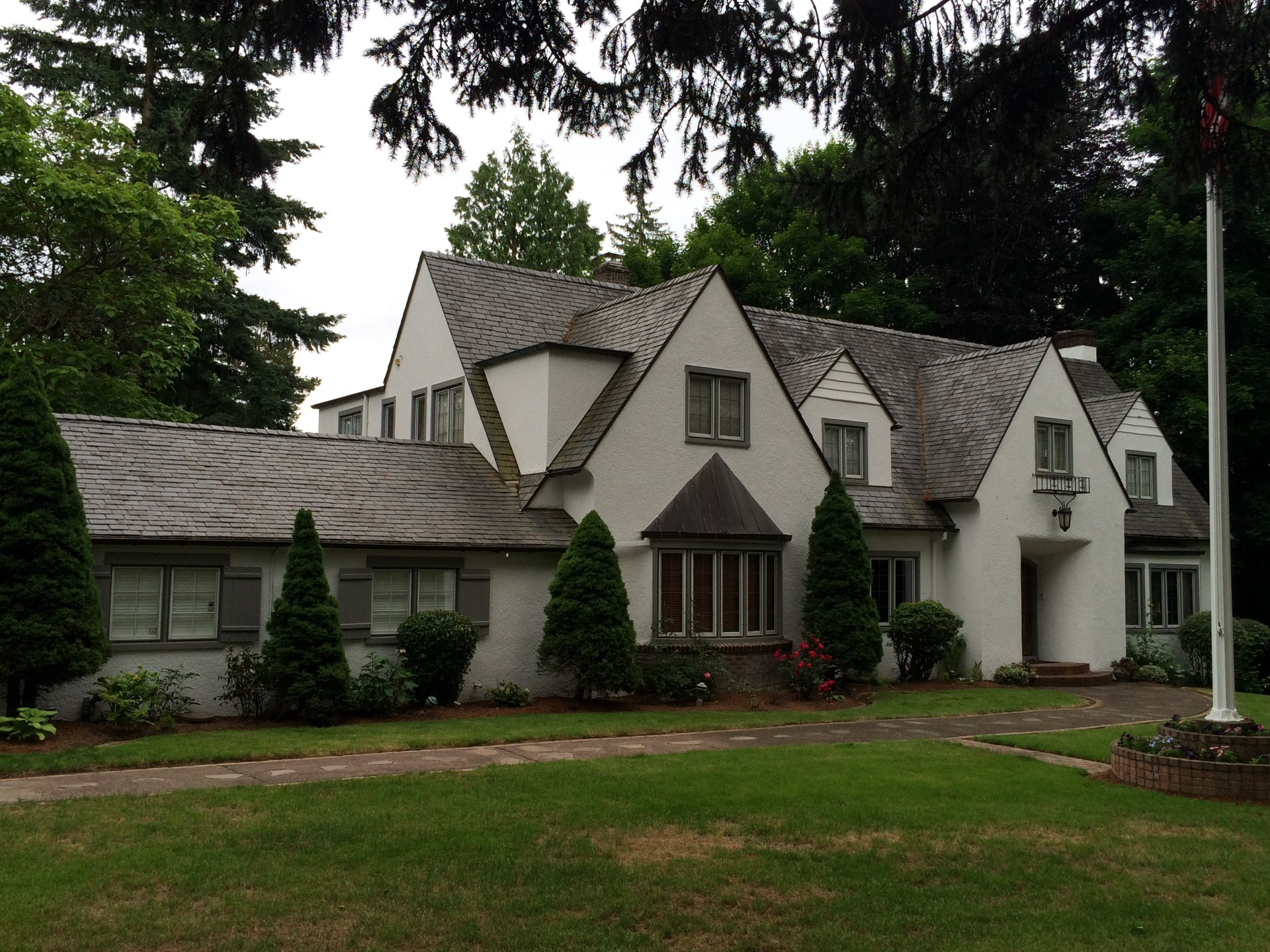
- The house in 2021
- Interactive map of Thomas Michos House
- Location: Portland, Oregon
- Architect: Roscoe Hemenway
- NRHP reference No.: 91001552
- Added to NRHP: October 17, 1991

The Thomas Michos House, located in Portland, Oregon, is a house listed on the National Register of Historic Places. The house is believed to be designed by Roscoe Hemenway, a well-known and prolific architect in Portland, Oregon. His name is listed as the heading in a 1975 Oregonian ad regarding this home. The landscape architect is believed to be Adolph Meyer of Alpine Gardens who designed the extensive gardens and stonework with ponds. He was Swiss-trained.

The original owners were Thomas and Myrtle Michos, who opened the Jolly Joan restaurant in 1932. This became Oregon's largest and most popular restaurant, serving up to 12,000 people per day at Broadway near Washington in the Morgan building, which later became the shopping mall Morgans Alley. For most of its existence, the Jolly Joan was open 24 hours per day 7 days a week, closing only for 2 hours during Roosevelt's funeral.

== See also ==
- National Register of Historic Places listings in Washington County, Oregon
