= Shaver–Bilyeu House =

Historic house in Oregon, United States

- U.S. National Register of Historic Places
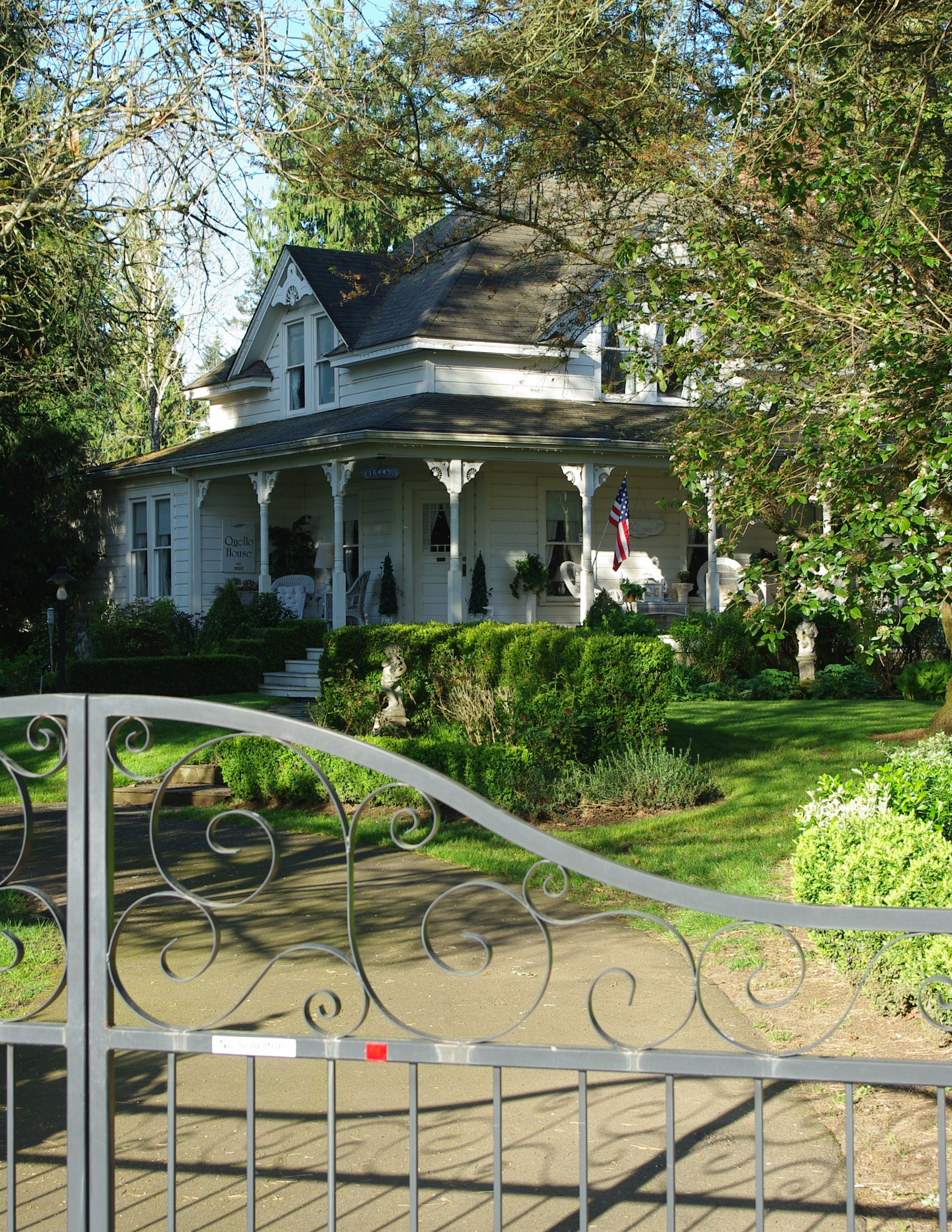
- The house in 2016

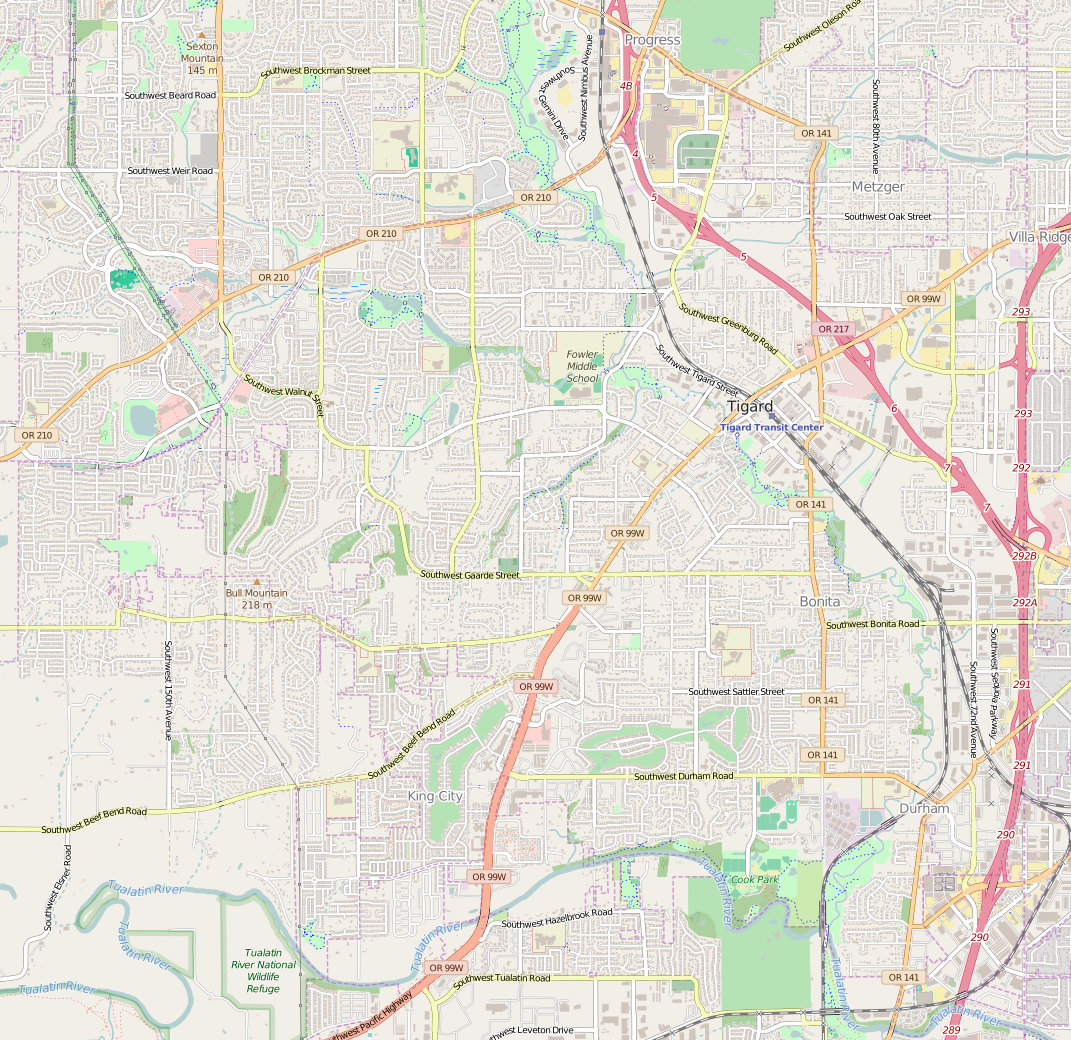
- Location within Tigard OR
- Location: 16445 SW 92nd Avenue; Tigard, Oregon, United States
- Coordinates: 45.401°N 122.7714°W
- Built: 1906
- Architectural style: Queen Anne Cottage
- NRHP reference No.: 93000014

The Shaver–Bilyeu House, located in Tigard, Oregon, is a house listed on the National Register of Historic Places.

== Architecture ==
The Shaver-Bilyeu House is a Queen Anne Cottage style single family home. A veranda wraps around three sides of the extieror of the house. The first floor contains a parlor, dining room, master bedroom and guest bedroom. The second floor of the house contains five bedrooms and one bathroom.

== See also ==
- National Register of Historic Places listings in Washington County, Oregon
