= James D. Robb House =

Historic house in Oregon, United States

Coordinates: 45.51547°N 123.10084°W

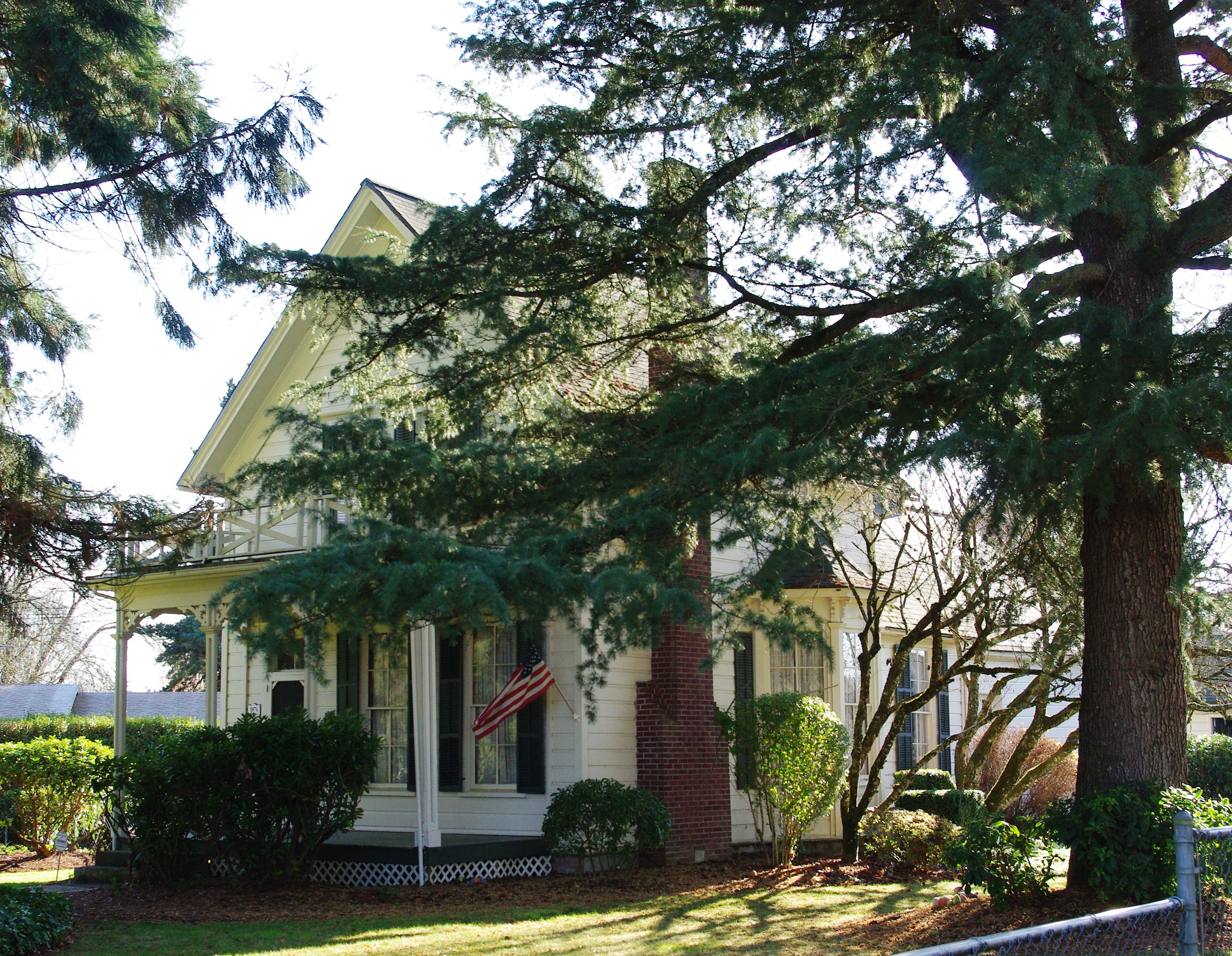
The house in 2009

The James D. Robb House, located in Forest Grove, Oregon, is a house listed on the National Register of Historic Places.

== See also ==
- National Register of Historic Places listings in Washington County, Oregon
