= John Tigard House =

Historic house in Oregon, United States

- U.S. National Register of Historic Places
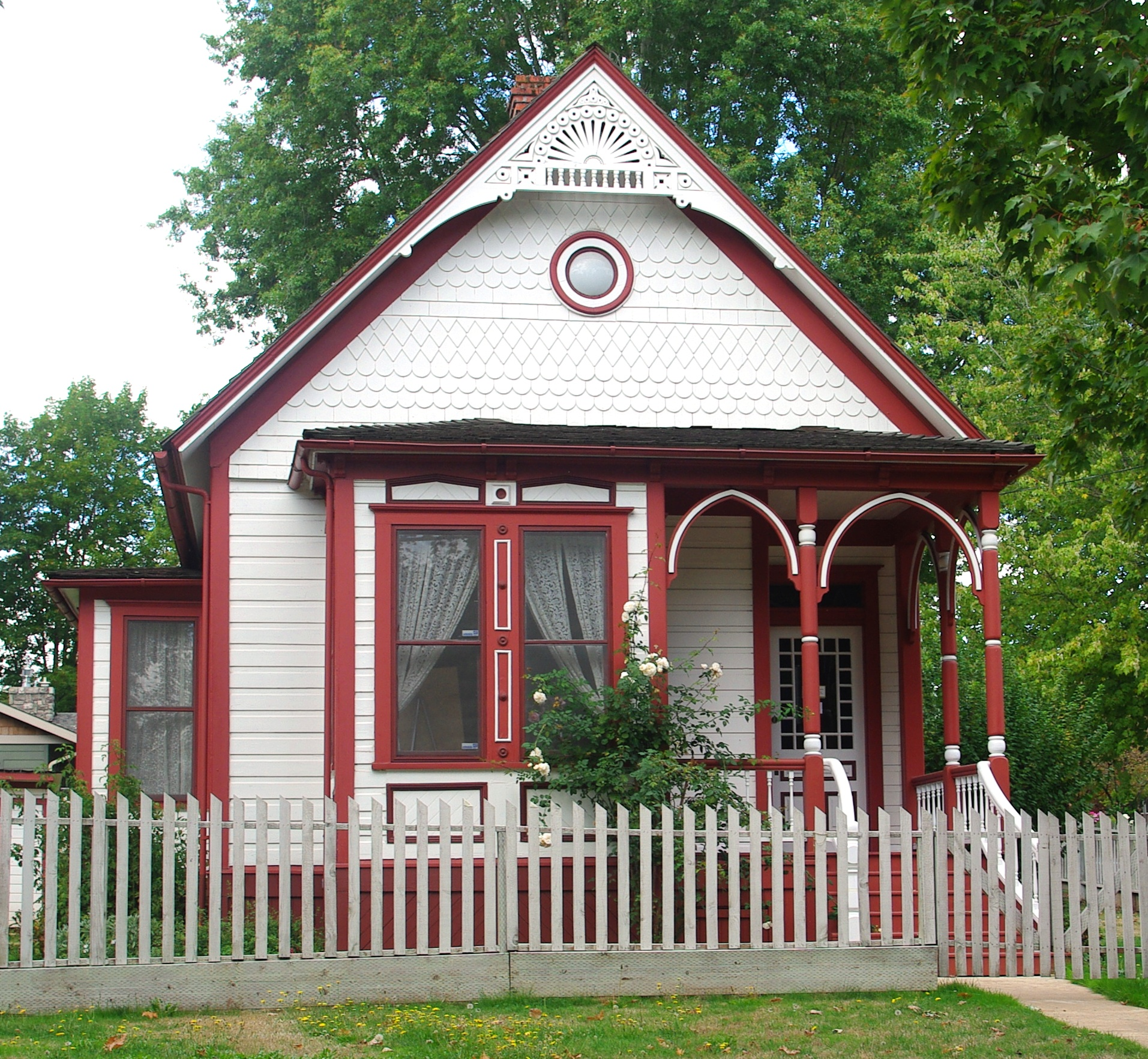
- The front of the house in 2009
- Location: Tigard, Oregon, USA
- Coordinates: 45°24′51″N 122°46′59″W
- Built: 1880
- Architectural style: Queen Anne
- NRHP reference No.: 79003739
- Added to NRHP: July 20, 1979

The John Tigard House is a home built in 1880 located in Tigard, Oregon. The home was originally owned by John Tigard, the son of Tigard founder Wilson Tigard. Queen Anne in style, the structure was moved from its original location along Oregon Route 99W in 1978. Now a museum, it was added to the National Register of Historic Places in 1979.

== History ==
In 1852, Wilson Tigard arrived over the Oregon Trail and settled in the southeast part of Washington County, Oregon, where he became the namesake to what was originally called Tigardville, and later shortened to Tigard. Tigard's oldest son John built a house in 1880 on a plot of land that is now at the intersection of Gaarde Street and Oregon Route 99W in Tigard. After a time the structure began to deteriorate and became run down by the 1970s.

In the 1970s a group of residents formed the Tigard Historical Association to prevent the house from being torn down. They moved the house in 1978 to its present location on Canterbury Lane at 103rd, east of the original location. The group then restored the home. In April 1979, the state's committee on historic preservation recommended the property be listed on the National Register of Historic Places, with the home added to the register on July 20, 1979, as the John Tigard House. The home has been used to host a variety of events, including an apple harvest festival in September 2007.

== Details ==
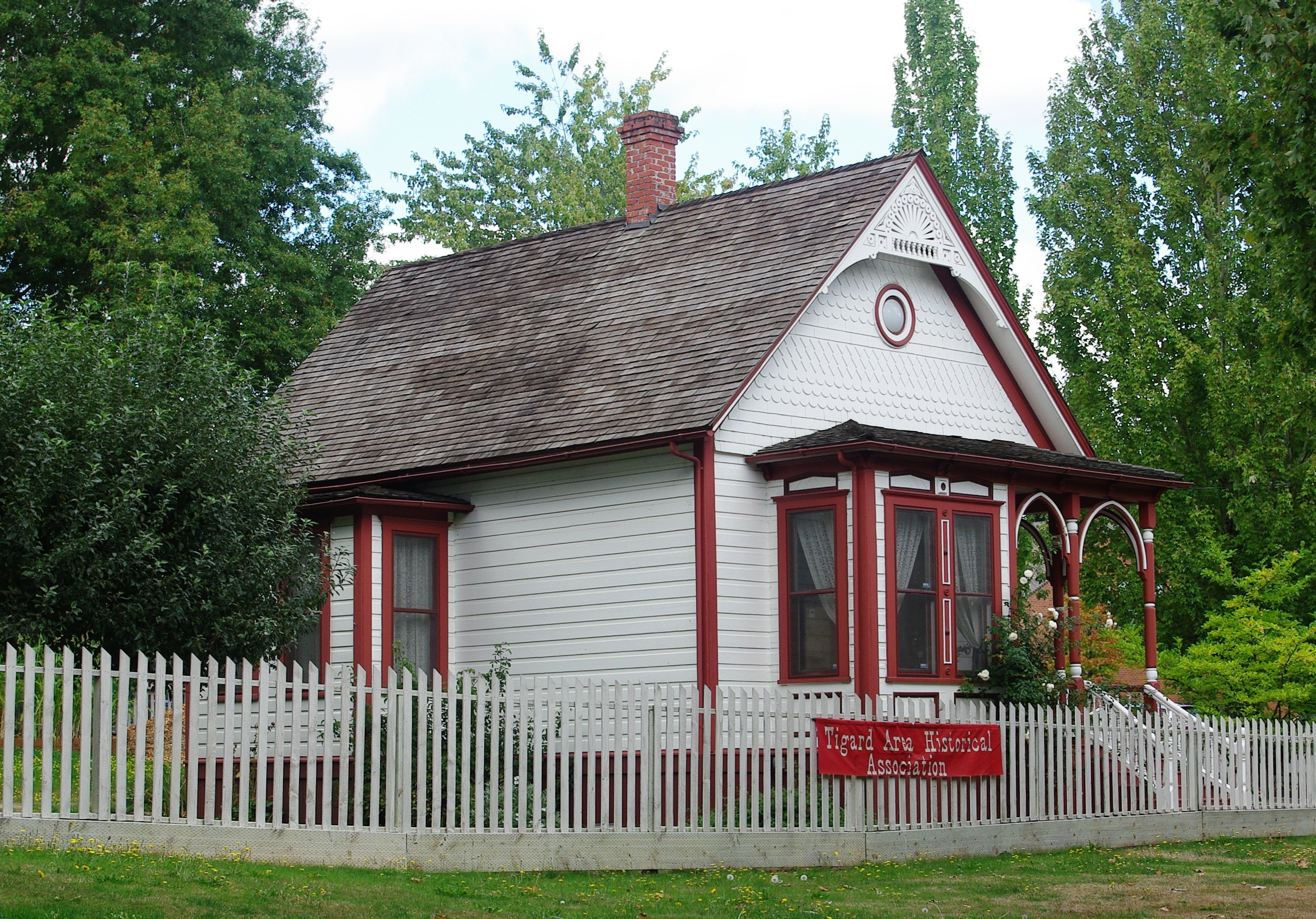
Side of the home

The 1 1/2-story wood building is in the Queen Anne style of architecture with some Carpenter Gothic elements. The home has three bedrooms and is now a museum for the Tigard Historical Society. The half story is an attic, which is used for storing artifacts of the historical society. Outside, the yard includes an apple orchard. Each year during December the home is decorated for Christmas. The free museum has an open house each month.
