= Isaac Macrum House =

Historic house in Oregon, United States

- U.S. National Register of Historic Places
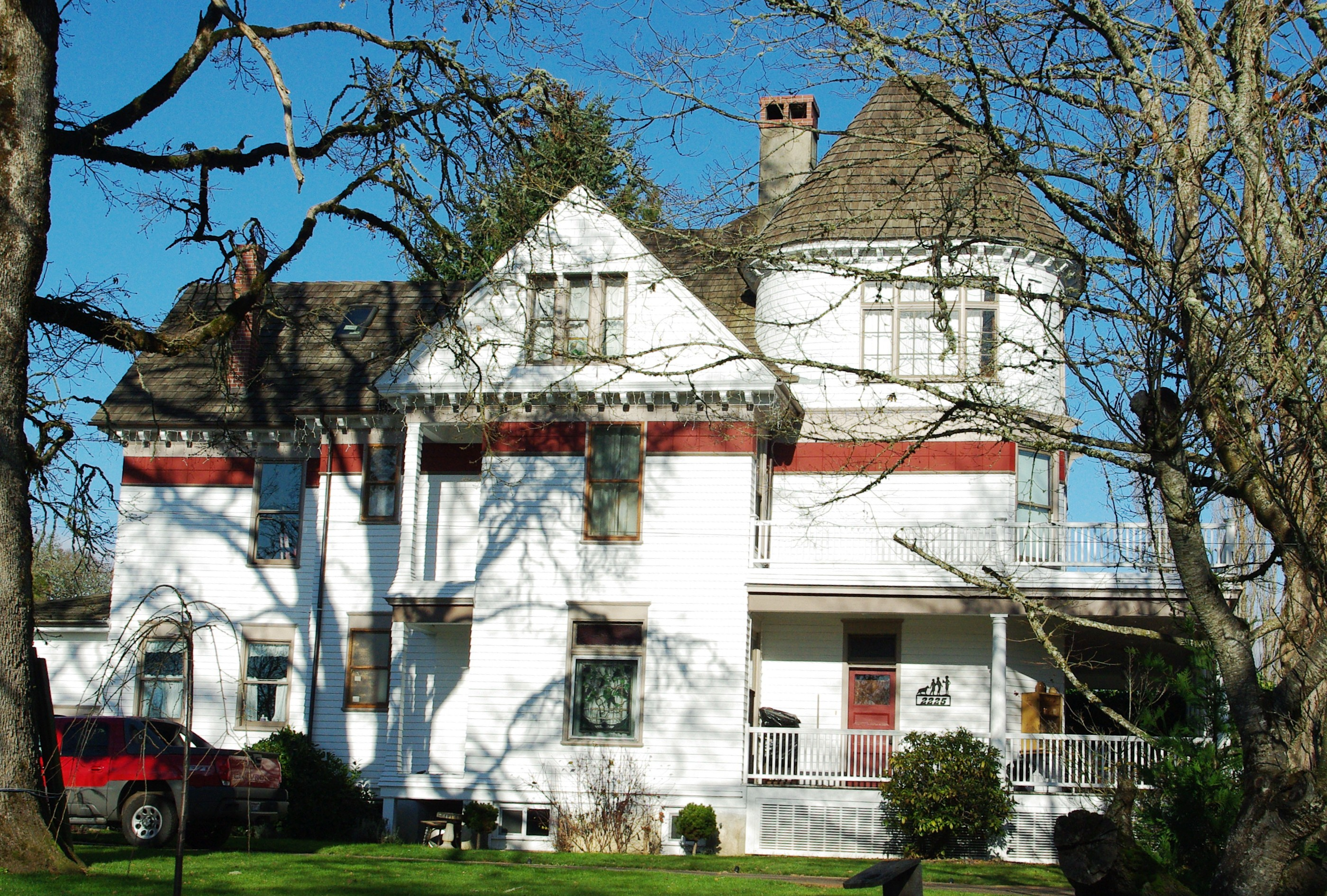
- The house in 2009

- Location within Oregon Location within the United States
- Location: 2225 12th Ave., Forest Grove, Oregon
- Coordinates: 45°30′40″N 123°06′22″W
- Area: 0.4 acres (0.16 ha)
- Built: 1888
- Architectural style: Queen Anne
- NRHP reference No.: 98001120
- Added to NRHP: August 28, 1998

The Isaac Macrum House, located in Forest Grove, Oregon, is a house that is listed on the National Register of Historic Places.

== See also ==
- National Register of Historic Places listings in Washington County, Oregon
