= Beaverton Downtown Historic District =

Historic district in Beaverton, Oregon, U.S.

- U.S. National Register of Historic Places
- U.S. Historic district
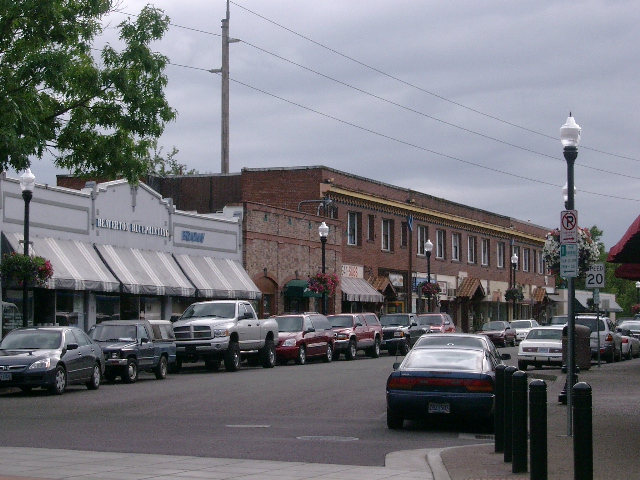
- Southwest Broadway Street in the Beaverton Downtown Historic District at the beginning of the 21st century. Along the far side of the street are contributing buildings Thrifty Market (historic name, 1926, left) and Edward Earl Fisher Building (1916, third from left).

- Location within Oregon Location within the United States

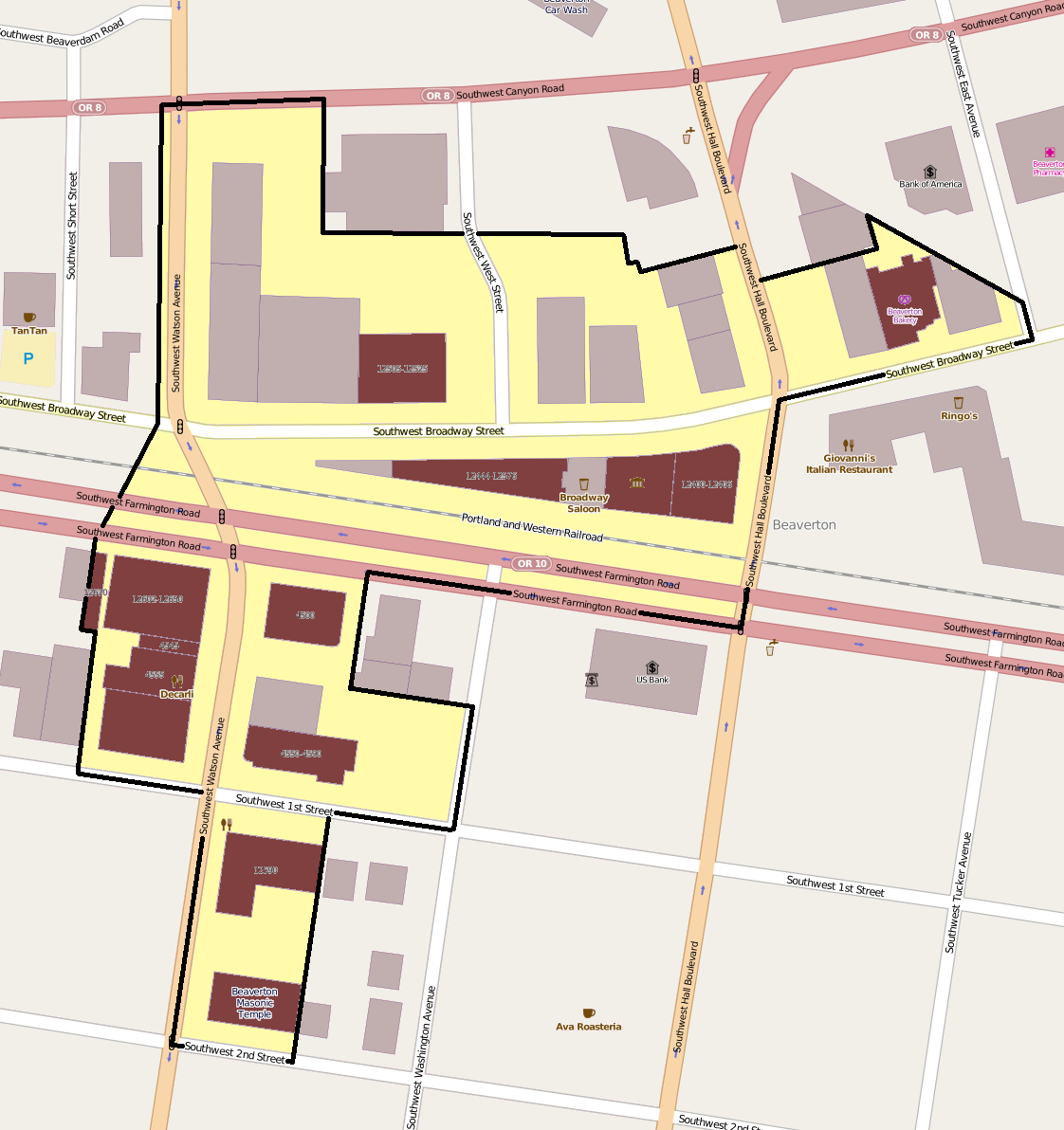
- The Beaverton Downtown Historic District boundaries (black line), and historic contributing resources in the district (brown).
- Location: Beaverton, Oregon, roughly bounded by SW Canyon Road and SW East, Washington, 2nd, and Watson Streets
- Coordinates: 45°29′15″N 122°48′20″W
- Area: 10.07 acres (4.08 ha)
- Built: 1887–1940
- NRHP reference No.: 86000037
- Added to NRHP: January 7, 1986

The Beaverton Downtown Historic District comprises a primarily commercial and civic portion of downtown Beaverton, Oregon, United States. Beaverton's historic commercial core remains largely intact as a pedestrian-oriented business district constructed along the street pattern from the city's earliest plats. Significant buildings include a handful from the city's first decades (1868–1920) and a larger number from the period of profound transformation between the world wars (1920–1940). The district was listed on the National Register of Historic Places in 1986.

== See also ==
- National Register of Historic Places listings in Washington County, Oregon
