= Adam and Johanna Feldman House =

House in Washington County, Oregon, U.S.

- U.S. National Register of Historic Places
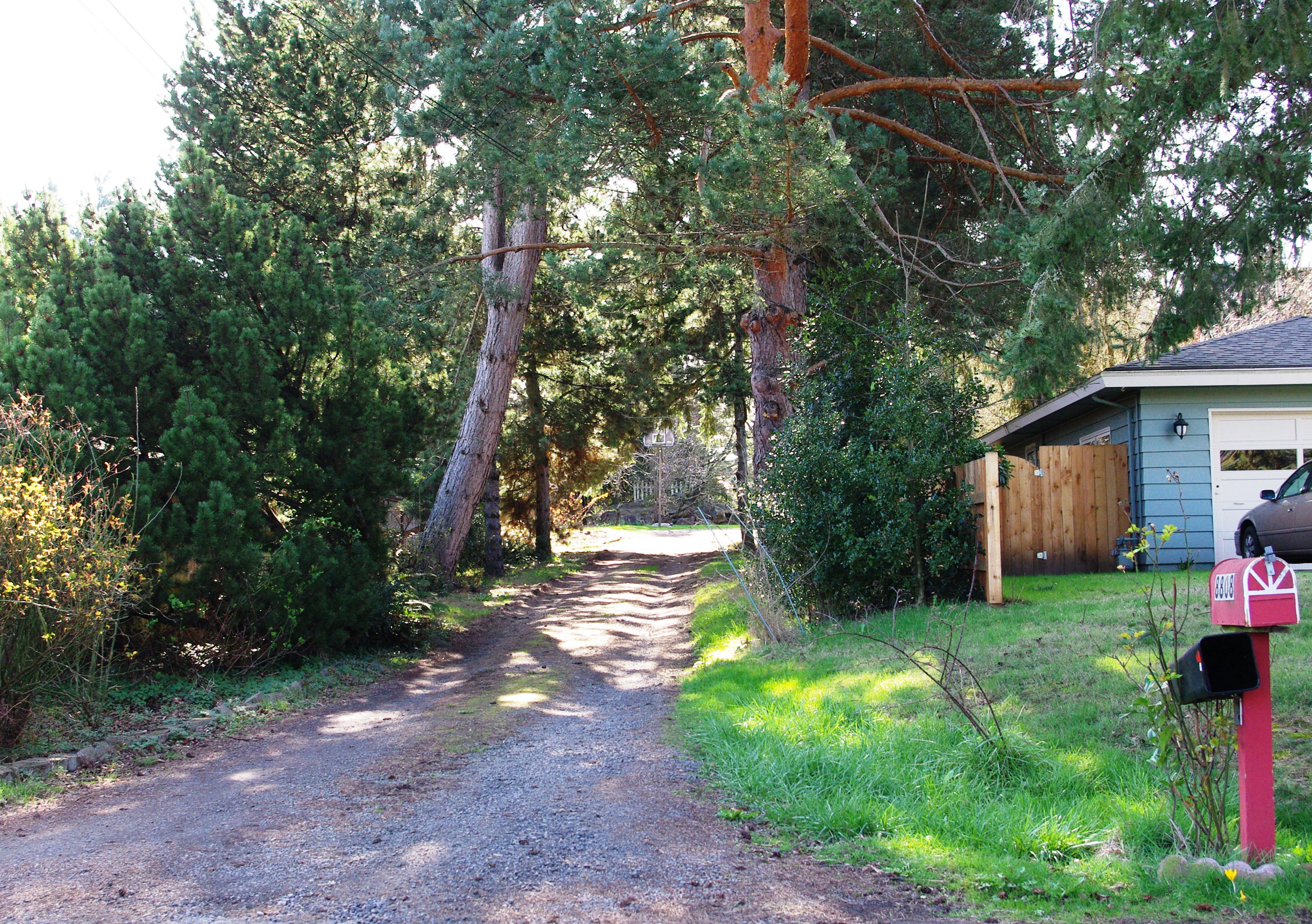
- Entrance to the property in 2010

- Location within Portland, Oregon
- Location: 8808 SW. Rambler Ln., Portland, Oregon vicinity
- Coordinates: 45°28′1″N 122°45′58″W
- Area: 0.5 acres (0.20 ha)
- Built: 1890
- NRHP reference No.: 93000013
- Added to NRHP: February 11, 1993

The Adam and Johanna Feldman House, located in the greater Portland, Oregon, area is listed on the National Register of Historic Places. It is located in an unincorporated part of Washington County, in the Garden Home–Whitford area.

== See also ==
- National Register of Historic Places listings in Washington County, Oregon
