= Ole and Polly Oleson Farmhouse =

Historic house in Oregon, United States

- U.S. National Register of Historic Places
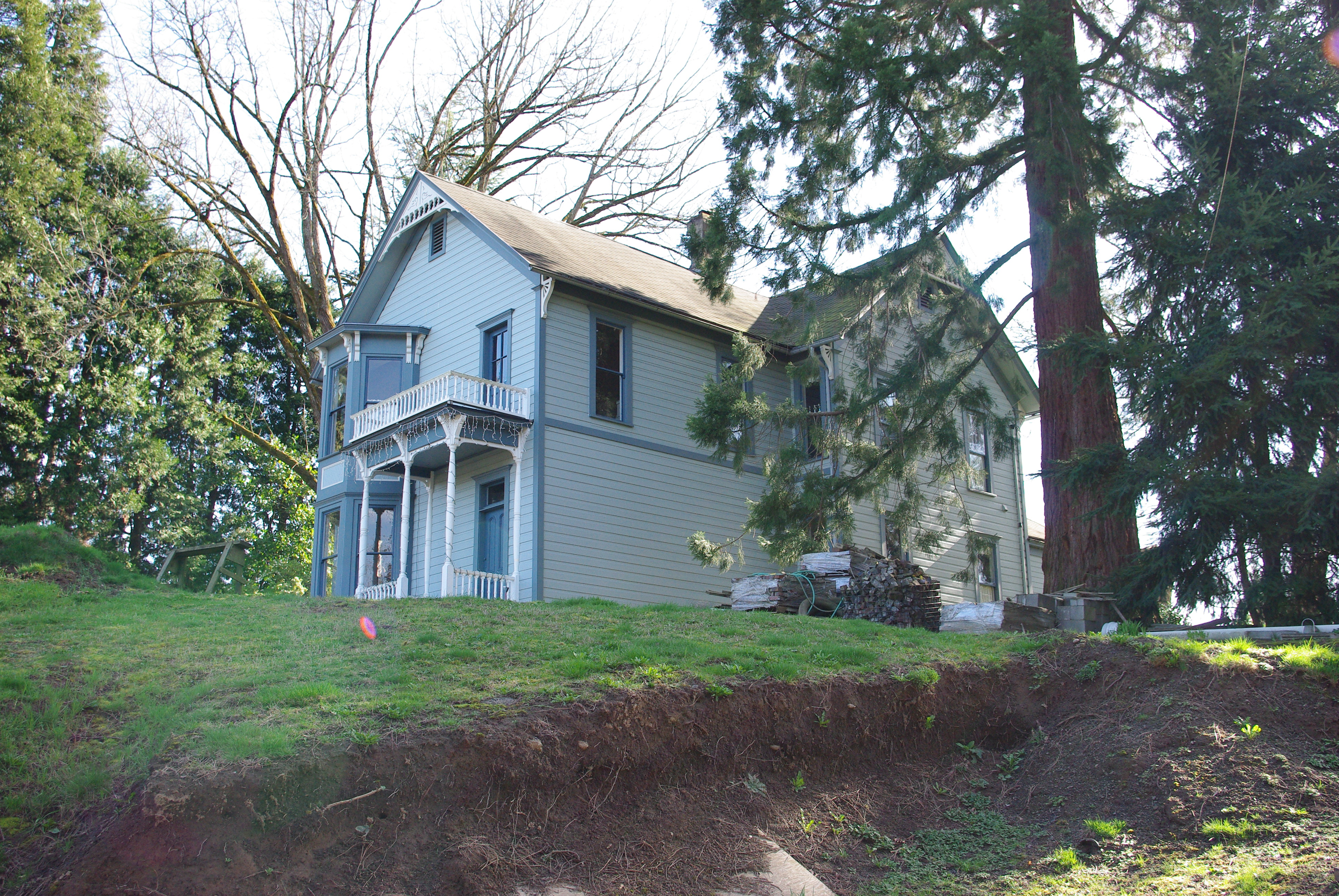

- Location within Oregon Location within the United States
- Location: 5430 SW Ames Way, Washington, Oregon
- Coordinates: 45°28′51″N 122°44′49″W
- Area: 1.31 acres (0.53 ha)
- Built: 1890
- Architectural style: Queen Anne/Eastlake
- NRHP reference No.: 91000140
- Added to NRHP: February 22, 1991

The Ole and Polly Oleson Farmhouse is a historic house located near Portland, Oregon. It was listed on the National Register of Historic Places on February 22, 1991.

== Description and history ==
The house is a two-story pattern book Queen Anne/Eastlake style house situated on 1.31 acres overlooking Ames Way and Oleson Road in the Raleigh Hills area of Washington County. The acreage is dominated by many original plantings by the Oieson family. It was built in 1889–1890, apparently as a replacement for an earlier 1860s structure.

== See also ==
- National Register of Historic Places listings in Washington County, Oregon
