= Silas Jacob N. Beeks House =

Historic house in Oregon, United States

- U.S. National Register of Historic Places
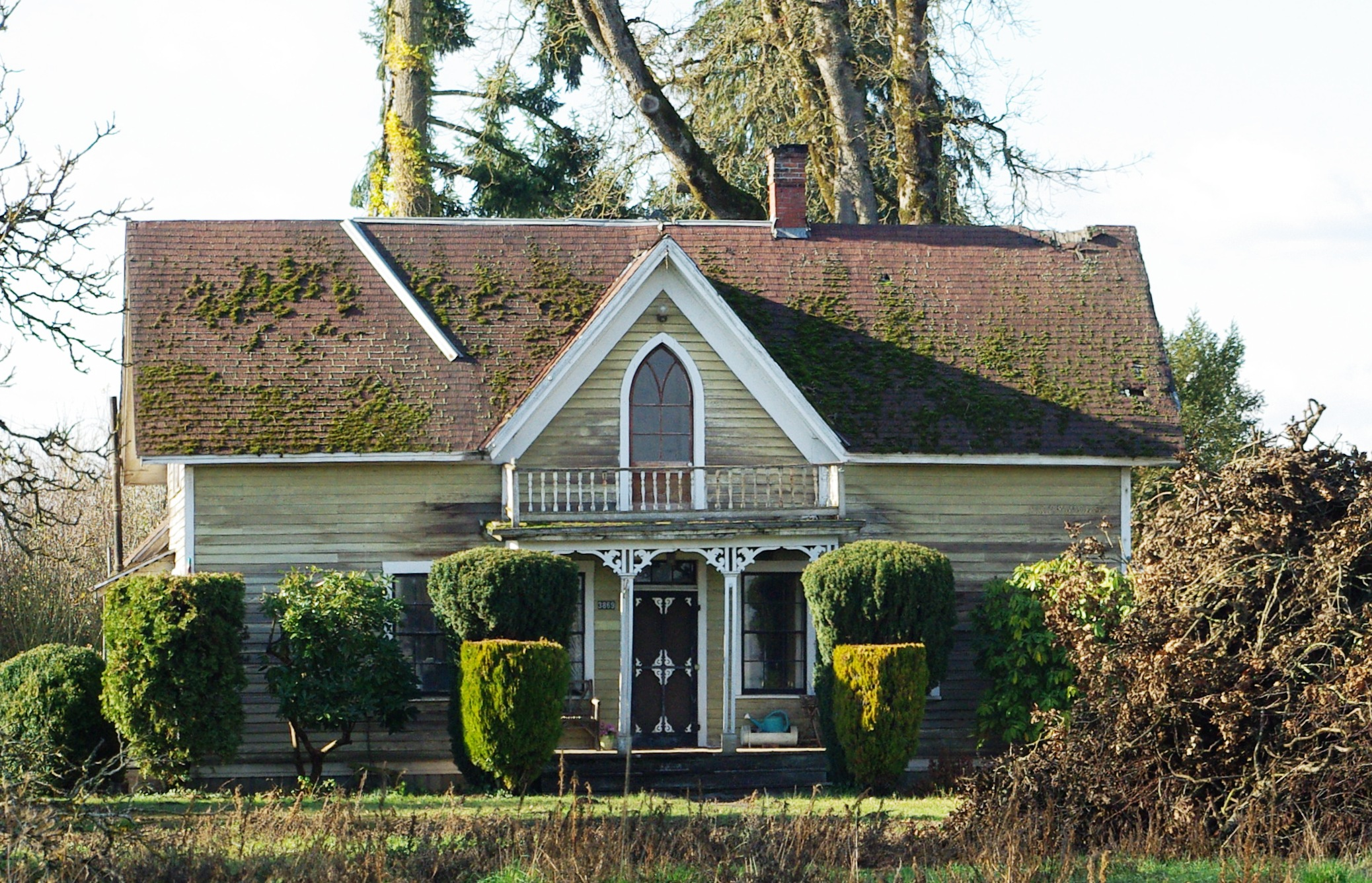

- Location within Oregon Location within the United States
- Nearest city: Forest Grove, Oregon
- Coordinates: 45°32′54″N 123°4′23″W
- Area: 1.7 acres (0.69 ha)
- Built: 1848
- Architectural style: Gothic Revival, Carpenter Gothic
- NRHP reference No.: 84003100
- Added to NRHP: June 14, 1984

The Silas Jacob N. Beeks House, located near Forest Grove, Oregon, is listed on the National Register of Historic Places. Jacob Beeks travelled with his wife to Oregon and built this house in multiple stages starting with the first part in 1848. About twelve years later he would finish the addition. He and his family remained in the house until 1899 when they sold it to a Dutch settler who was the father of Martin Bernards who would go on to establish one of the first trucking companies in Oregon. They then moved to live with their Son in Klickitat County, Washington.

== Architecture ==
The house is designed in a Gothic style including the addition that was added later. It has "Downing style" aspects including the color of the paint which was determined to be "Downing Yellow"

== See also ==
- National Register of Historic Places listings in Washington County, Oregon
