= John and Elsie Parsons House =

Historic house in Oregon, United States

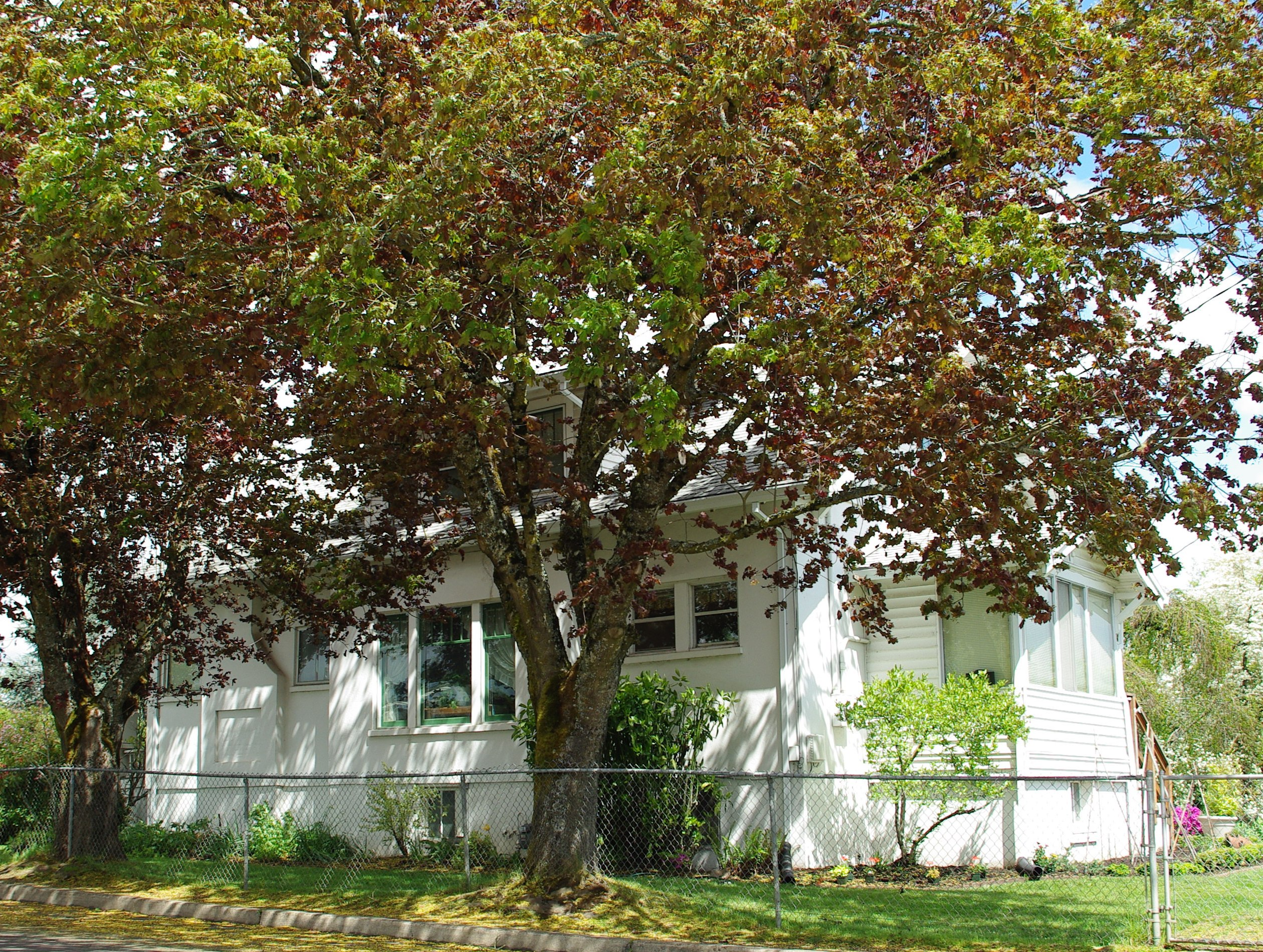
The house in 2009

The John and Elsie Parsons House, located in Forest Grove, Oregon, is a house listed on the National Register of Historic Places.

== See also ==
- National Register of Historic Places listings in Washington County, Oregon
