= Schanen–Zolling House =

Historic house in Oregon, United States

- Schanen-Zolling House
- U.S. National Register of Historic Places
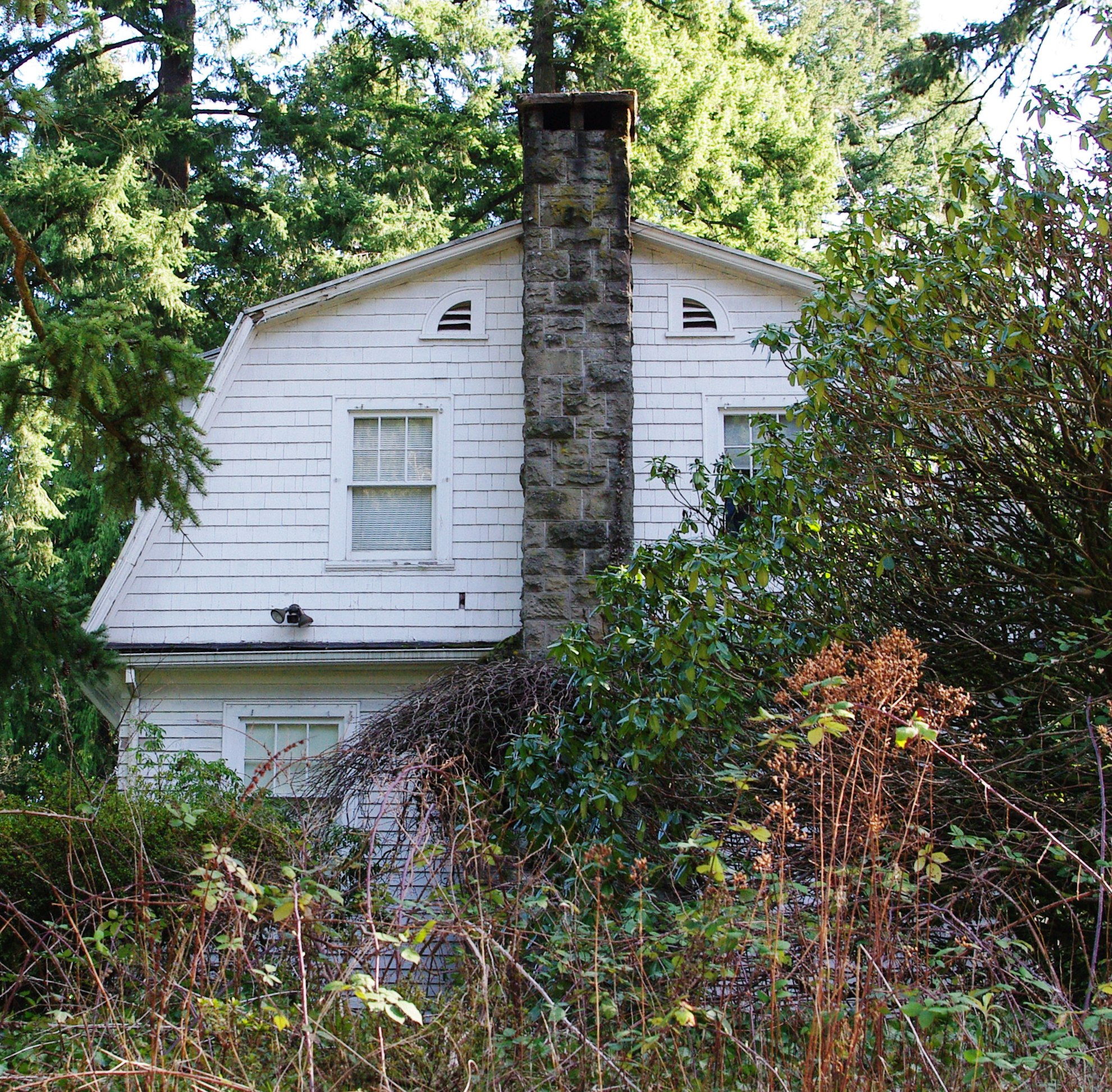
- The house in 2010

- Location within Portland, Oregon Location within Oregon Location within the United States
- Location: 6750 S.W. Oleson Rd., Portland, Oregon
- Coordinates: 45°28′15″N 122°44′57″W
- Area: 1 acre (0.40 ha)
- Built: 1922
- Architectural style: Colonial Revival, Dutch Colonial
- NRHP reference No.: 85003340
- Added to NRHP: December 10, 1985

The Schanen–Zolling House, located in Portland, Oregon, is a house listed on the National Register of Historic Places.

== See also ==
- National Register of Historic Places listings in Washington County, Oregon
