= Fogelbo House =

United States historic place

- Fogelbo House (Fogelquist)
- U.S. National Register of Historic Places
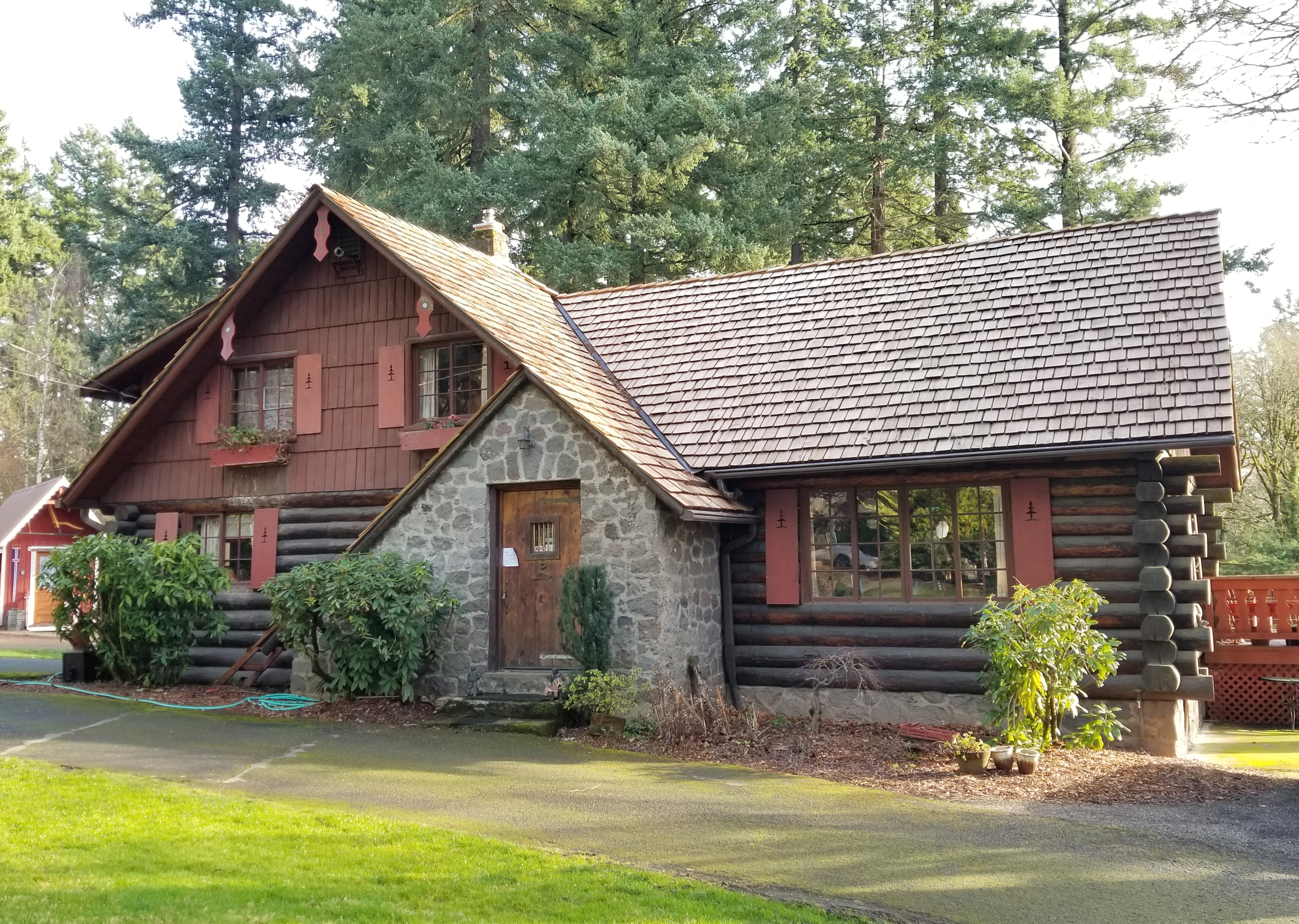
- Fogelbo House (January 19, 2020)

- Location within Oregon Location within the United States
- Location: 8740 Southwest Oleson Road, Portland, Oregon
- Coordinates: 45°27′24″N 122°46′00″W
- Built: 1938
- Architectural style: Craftsman architecture
- NRHP reference No.: 100005343
- Added to NRHP: 2020

Fogelbo House is a log house located in Portland, Oregon, United States. It was listed on the National Register of Historic Places in July 2020. The word fogelbo means "bird nest" in Swedish, and is derived from the Fogelquist family name, meaning "bird on a branch."

== History ==
The log house was built in 1938 by father-son duo Henry Steiner and John Steiner. Later in 1952, the house was purchased by the Fogelquists. In 1978, Washington County designated Fogelbo as a historical site. The estate was deeded to the neighboring nonprofit Nordic Northwest in 2015.

The current residing member of the Fogelquist family, Sir Ross Fogelquist is a member of the Order of the Polar Star and was knighted by the King of Sweden. An avid collector, Sir Ross Fogelquist has transformed the home into one of the largest private collections of Nordic antiques in the United States. The collection hosted in the house's interior is open to publicly scheduled tours, typically led by Sir Fogelquist himself.

Steiner senior was known for various log houses built in and around Mount Hood area. One famous example is Timberline Lodge, which is also registered with NRHP since 1973.
