= Dr. W. R. and Eunice Taylor House =

United States historic place

- U.S. National Register of Historic Places
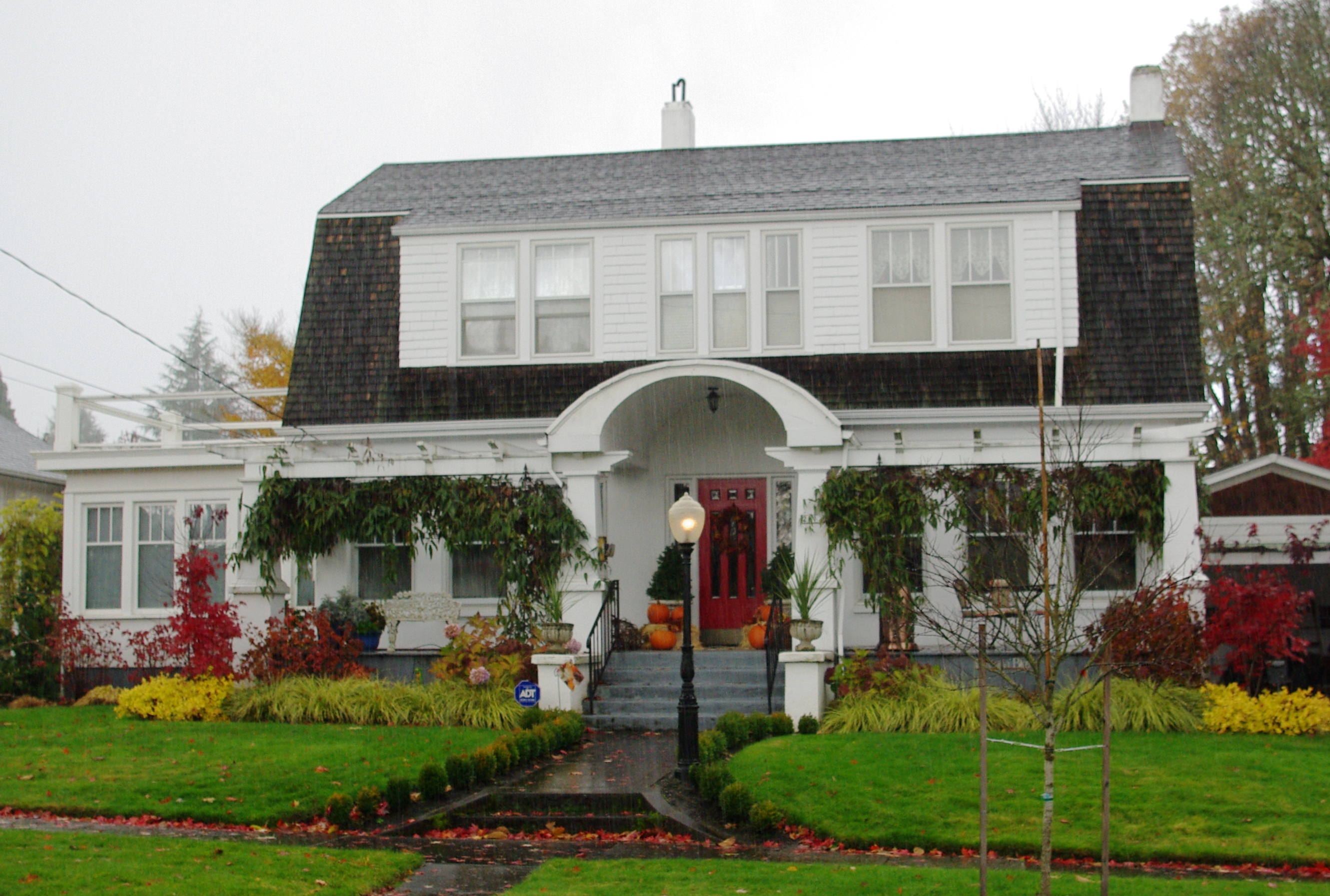
- Dr. W.R. and Eunice Taylor House (November 2009)

- Location within Oregon Location within the United States
- Location: 2212 A Street, Forest Grove, Oregon
- Coordinates: 45°31′21″N 123°06′50″W
- Built: 1921
- Architectural style: Colonial Revival architecture
- NRHP reference No.: 05000851
- Added to NRHP: August 10, 2005

Dr. W. R. and Eunice Taylor House is a mansion located in Forest Grove, Oregon. It was listed on the National Register of Historic Places in 2005.

== History ==
The house was built in 1921 by John Taylor as per the Dutch Colonial Revival-style dwelling. It was remodelled two times, first time in 1982, then the last one was in the year 1995.
