= Woods and Caples General Store =

Building in Forest Grove, Oregon, U.S.

- Woods and Caples General Store (Grove Furniture Store)
- U.S. National Register of Historic Places
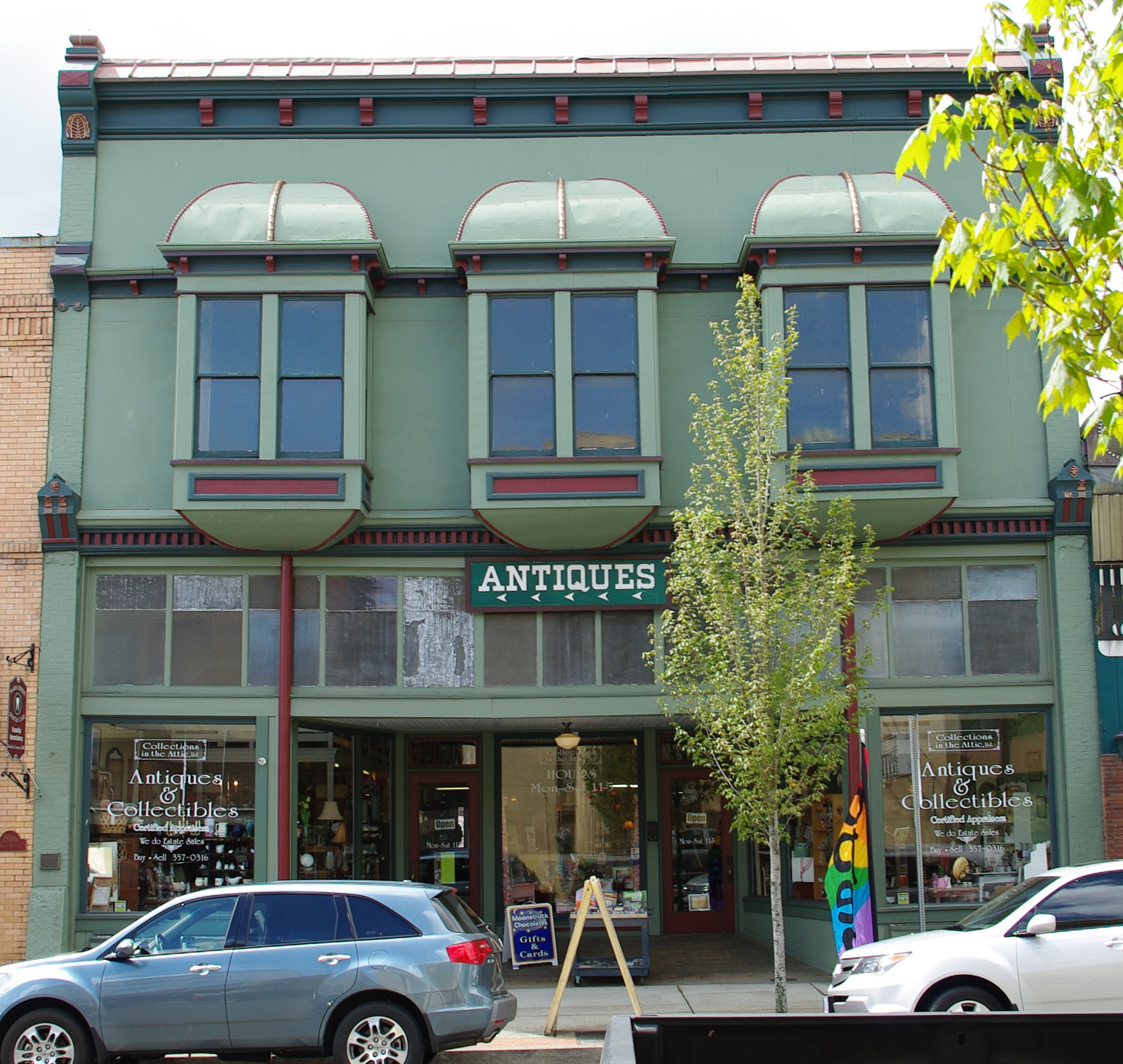
- The Woods and Caples General Store in Forest Grove, Oregon, on Main Street. (May 5, 2009)

- Location within Oregon Location within the United States
- Location: 2020 Main Street, Forest Grove, Oregon
- Coordinates: 45°31′12″N 123°06′44″W
- Built: 1893
- Architectural style: Italianate architecture
- NRHP reference No.: 85003028
- Added to NRHP: December 2, 1985

Woods and Caples General Store (also known as Grove Furniture Store) is a general store located at Forest Grove, Oregon. It is listed on the National Register of Historic Places in 1985.

== History ==
The general store was built in 1893. It is considered as an important landmark in Forest Grove Downtown Historic District. Along with First Church of Christ, Scientist, it is listed with NRHP.
