= J. S. and Melinda Waggener Farmstead =

United States historic place

- U.S. National Register of Historic Places
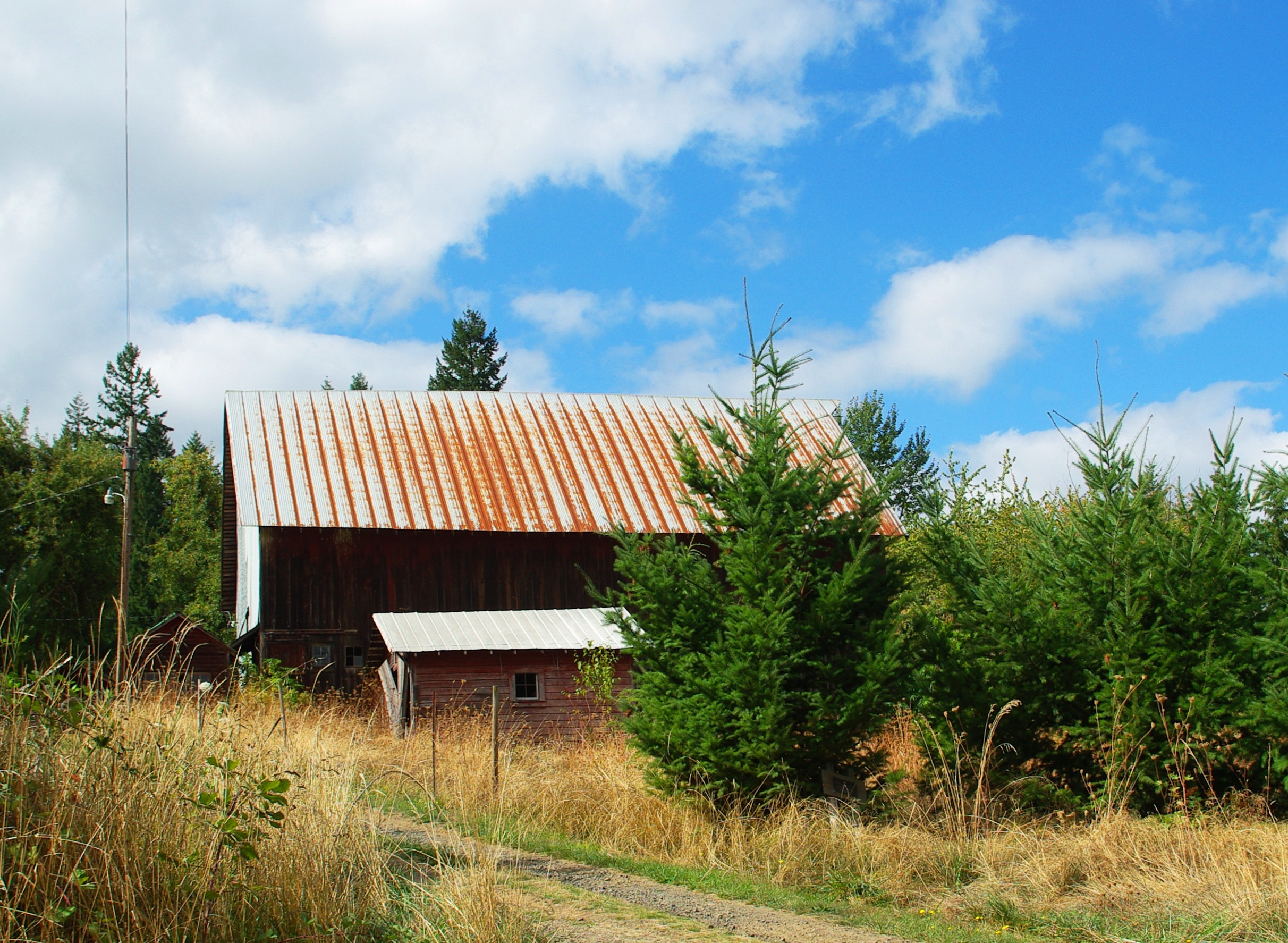
- J. S. and Melinda Waggener Farmstead (September 30, 2009)

- Location within Oregon Location within the United States
- Location: 34680 SE Firdale Road, Cornelius, Oregon
- Coordinates: 45°26′37″N 123°02′29″W
- Built: 1940
- Architectural style: Victorian architecture
- NRHP reference No.: 03000693
- Added to NRHP: July 25, 2003

J. S. and Melinda Waggener Farmstead is a farm located in Cornelius, Washington County, Oregon. It is listed on the National Register of Historic Places in 2003.
