= Doriot–Rider Log House =

United States historic place

- U.S. National Register of Historic Places
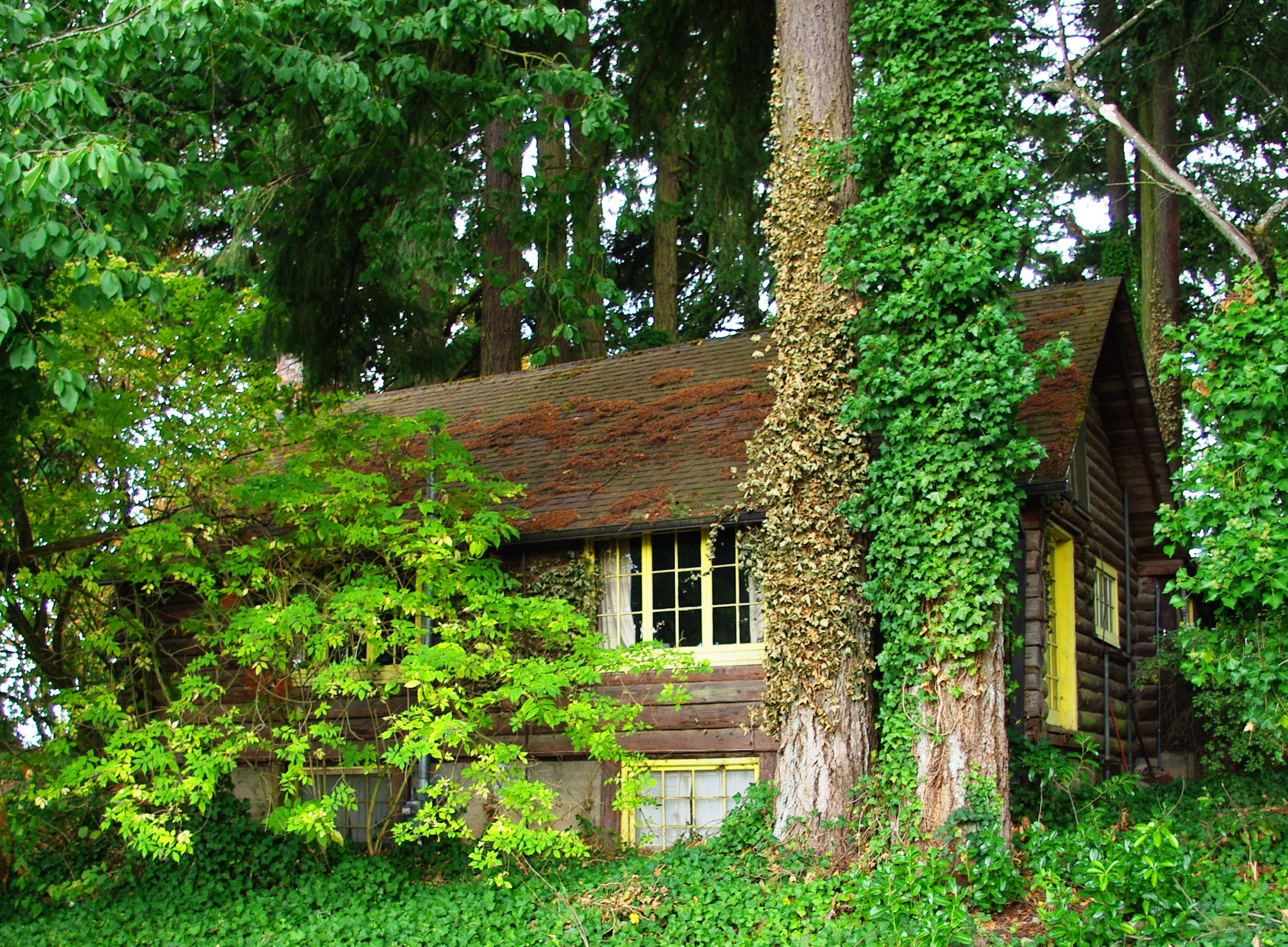
- Doriot–Rider Log House (October 2, 2009)

- Location within Oregon Location within the United States
- Location: 14850 Southwest 132nd Terrace, Tigard, Washington County, Oregon
- Coordinates: 45°24′46″N 122°48′44″W
- Built: 1925
- Architectural style: Vernacular architecture
- NRHP reference No.: 08000554
- Added to NRHP: 2008

Doriot–Rider Log House is a log house at Tigard in Washington County, Oregon. It was listed on the National Register of Historic Places in June 2008.

== History ==
In 1925, the log house was built for the guests by Harry Garfield and Delpha Doriot on their 20-acre property on Bull Mountain. Later in the year 1947, the Riders sold the property to Charles and Alberta Ryder.

It is architecturally significant as a vernacular log house reflecting a period when simple and rustic architecture in post-industrial world was popular.
