= Shute–Meierjurgen Farmstead =

United States historic place

- Shute–Meierjurgen Farmstead (Shute Constable Five Oaks)
- U.S. National Register of Historic Places
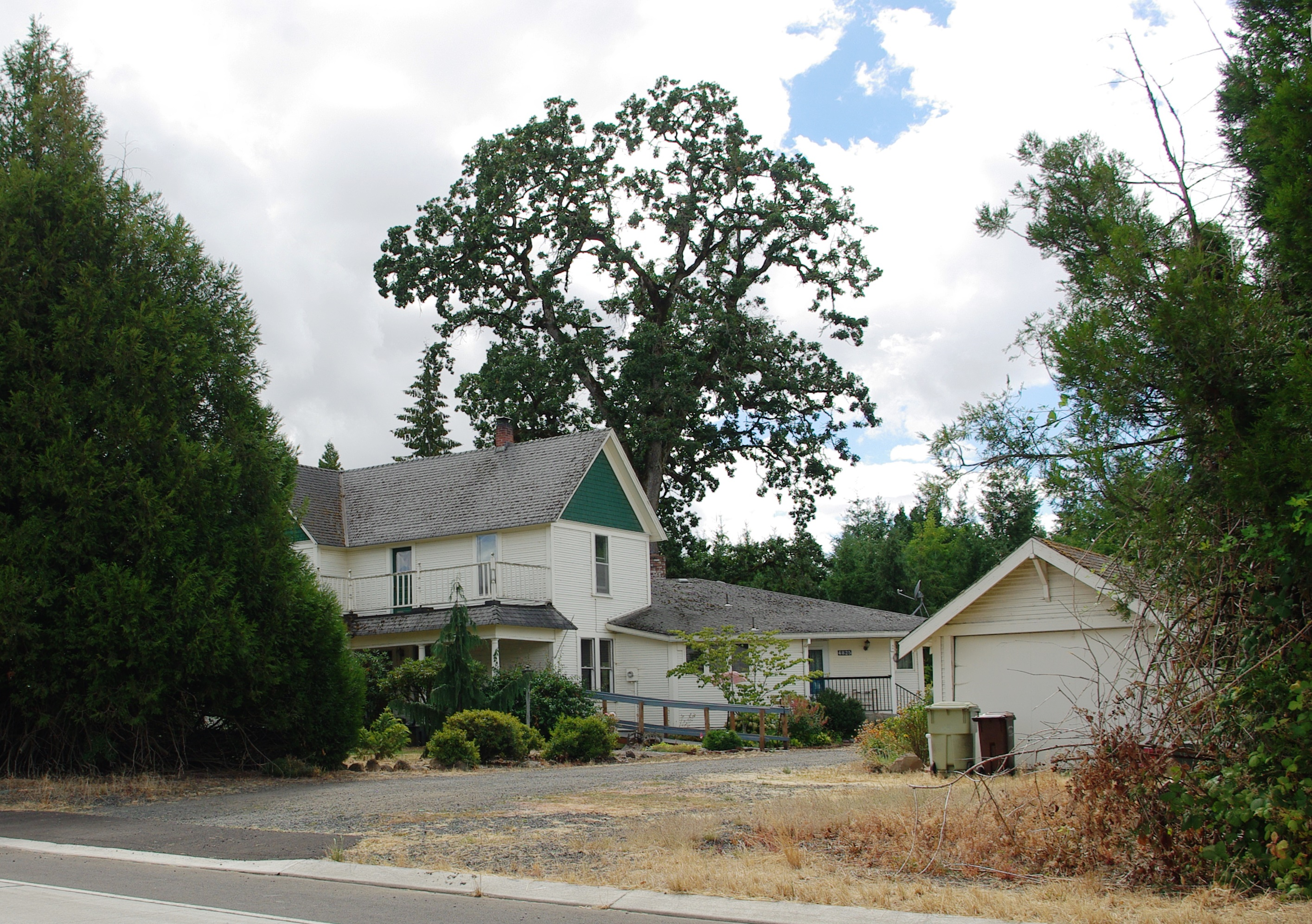
- Shute–Meierjurgen Farmstead (August 11, 2018)

- Location within Oregon Location within the United States
- Location: 4825 NE Starr Boulevard, Hillsboro, Oregon
- Coordinates: 45°33′19″N 122°56′14″W
- Built: 1890
- Architectural style: Queen Anne style architecture
- NRHP reference No.: 100002647
- Added to NRHP: July 6, 2018

Historic Name	Shute-Meierjurgen Farmstead
Other Names	Shute Residence, John W. & Lizzie Shute Farmstead, Shute Constable Five Oaks
Location	4825 NE Starr Blvd, Hillsboro (vicinity), Washington County, Oregon (97124)
Setting	Located approximately 3.3 miles northeast of downtown Hillsboro, immediately outside the city limits. It is situated on a 3.34-acre tax lot within the original Constable "Five Oaks" donation land claim, surrounded by fertile Tuality Plains farmland.
Ownership	Private
Resources Count	3 Contributing Resources: (1) Farmhouse, (2) Barn, (3) Garage.
Period of Significance	1890–1919 (From the original house construction to the completion of the garage).
Significant Dates	1890 (House built), 1910 (North wing/Barn complete), 1919 (Garage complete)

== History ==
=== I. Significance ===
The Shute-Meierjurgen Farmstead is locally significant in the area of Architecture.

- Applicable Criterion: Criterion C (Property embodies the distinctive characteristics of a type, period, or method of construction, or represents the work of a master, or possesses high artistic values).
- Justification: The property is considered an excellent and increasingly rare example of a late 19th-to-early 20th-century farmstead within the Hillsboro Urban Growth Boundary (UGB) that has maintained good integrity.
  - House: Reflects the typical late-nineteenth-century Western Farmhouse form combined with Queen Anne stylistic ornamentation, indicating the elevated economic status of its owners.
  - Barn: A largely intact, fine example of an early twentieth-century hay and livestock barn.
  - Garage: An almost completely intact, purpose-built pre-1920 automobile storage building.
- Integrity: The farmstead maintains excellent integrity in its setting, location, and association, and retains good integrity of design, materials, workmanship, and feeling.

=== II. Contributing Resources ===
The three contributing resources are all wood-frame structures.

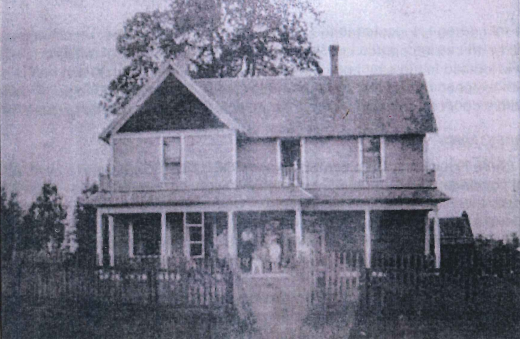
Historic photo taken ca. 1910, showing the west facade of the house (courtesy of Ray Haag)

==== 1. Farmhouse (1890, 1910 Addition) ====
- Architectural Style: Queen Anne-vernacular.
- Original Construction (1890): Built by John Wright Shute and Elizabeth Constable Shute. It was a two-story cross-gabled structure with an offset "T" shape.
  - Exterior: Features double-drop beveled wood siding, shingle siding in the gable ends, a prominent full-width, two-story porch with wood columns and turned balusters, and a classical design sensibility.
  - Interior (1890 Massing): Retains original features like the leaded glass front door, wood trim (unpainted and classically-inspired), original door knobs and church key locks, and evidence of former kerosene/gas lighting fixtures. Wallpaper patterns from the era were preserved, including those glued over a 1900 newspaper layer.
- 1910 Addition (North Wing): Built by William Meierjurgen. This two-story wing included a new main entrance, a dining room with a large, double-wide sliding wood pocket door to the old parlor, and an upstairs hallway with two bedrooms. It features an original built-in cabinet wall with glass doors and a rare upstairs accessible porch.
- 1976 Alteration (Non-Contributing): A one-story, hip-roof addition was built on the northwest façade (rear), which included a new large dining room/living room with a working double fireplace and added first and second-floor bathrooms to the west end of the original structure.

==== 2. Barn (1910) ====
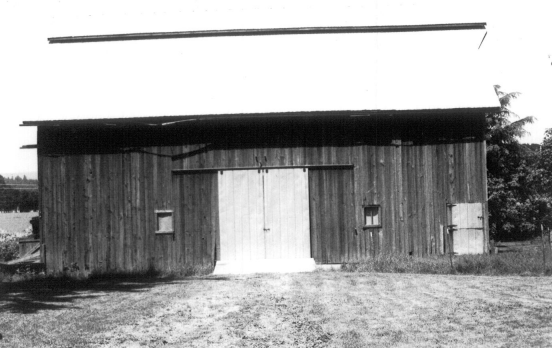
- Front of barn showing large metal double door entrance
  Type: Two-story, gable-roof livestock and hay barn.
- Dimensions: 64 feet long (east-west) by 38 feet wide (north-south).
- Construction: Built by William Meierjurgen. Rests on a rock/concrete and wood pier foundation, featuring hand-hewn 12x12 old-growth timber beams.
- Key Features: Corrugated metal roof with a continuous ridge vent. The original rope and pulley hay bale elevator system and mechanical trolley are still visible in the loft ("mows"). It is clad in vertical wood boards.
- Current Use: Vacant/Used for storage (not feed or livestock since the early 1980s).

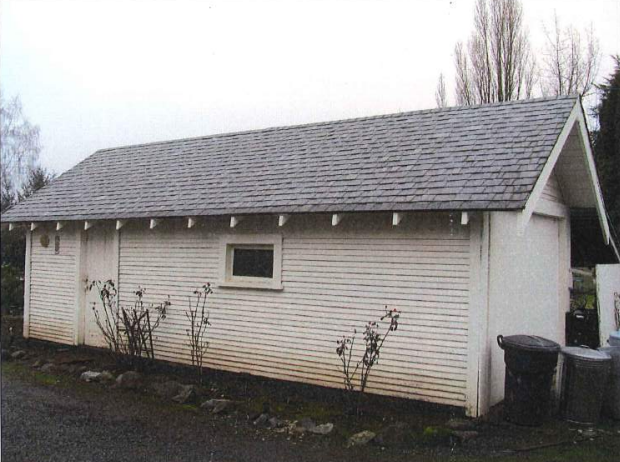
Southeast angle of Garage, looking NW

==== 3. Garage (1919) ====
- Type: Single-story, gable-roof.
- Construction: Built by William Meierjurgen.
- Use: Originally built to house the family's automobiles (Overland Willys and Willys-Knight). The west end houses the main water system and pump house.
- Current Use: Tool shop. Described as being in original condition with no changes.

==== 4. Landscape Elements ====
The 3.34-acre property includes landscape elements that reinforce its agricultural context:

- An estimated 300-year-old Oregon white oak that shades the west side of the house.
- Four apple trees (remnants of an earlier 10-acre orchard).
- A large vegetable garden (in the location of the historic subsistence garden).
- Hawthorne trees (starts from trees purchased from the Oregon Nursery Company).

=== III. Ownership and History ===
- Founding: The farmstead is located on the original Edward and Brazilla Constable "Five Oaks" donation land claim (DLC). The Constables were part of the 1843 Cow Column, the first Oregon emigrant wagon train.
- Shute Family (1890–1904): John W. Shute and Elizabeth Constable Shute (Edward and Brazilla's daughter) built the original 1890 house.
- Meierjurgen Family (1904–~1962): William and Anne Meierjurgen purchased the farmstead in 1904. William built the 1910 north wing addition, the 1910 barn, and the 1919 garage.
- Haag Family (~1962–Present): The Haags arrived in 1962 and were responsible for the 1976 addition and interior renovations, though they preserved many historic details and materials.

== Gallery ==
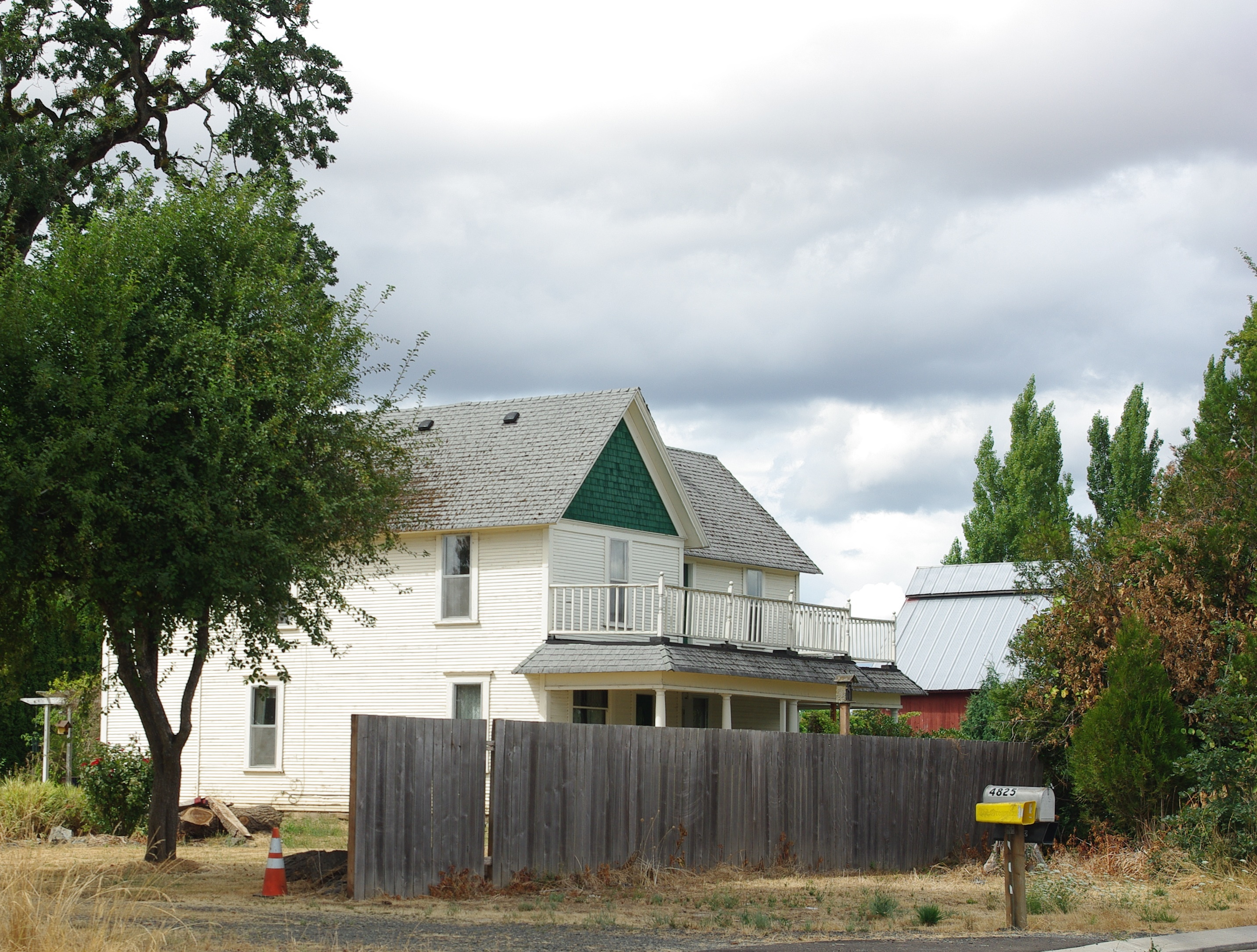

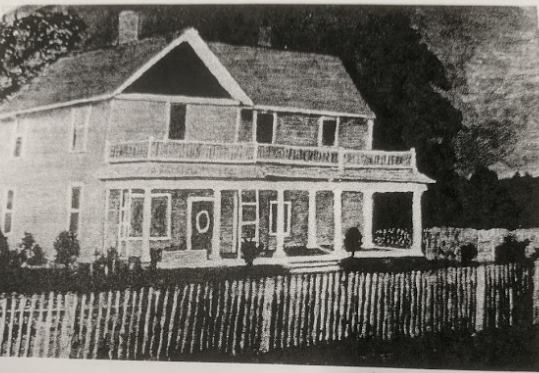

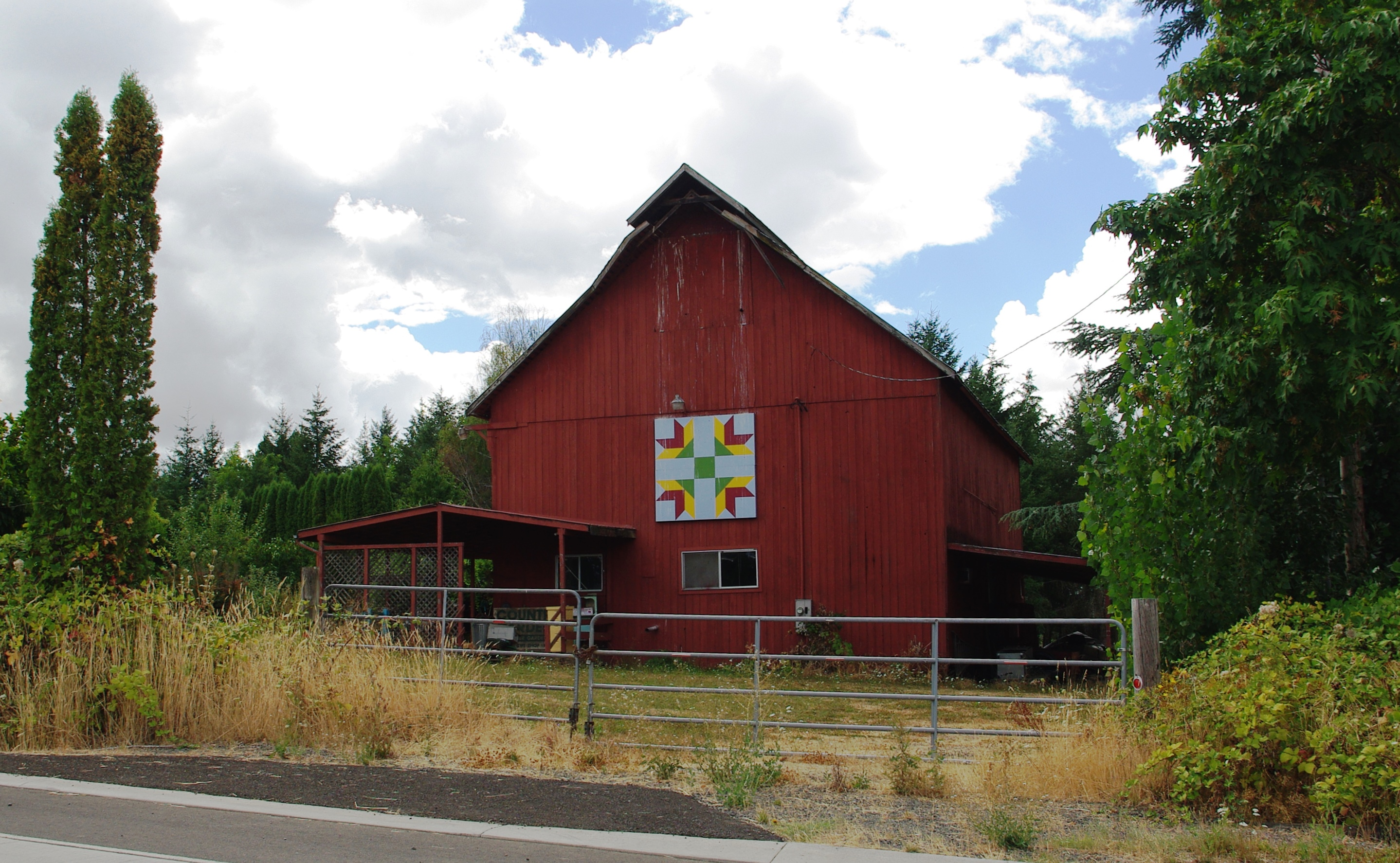

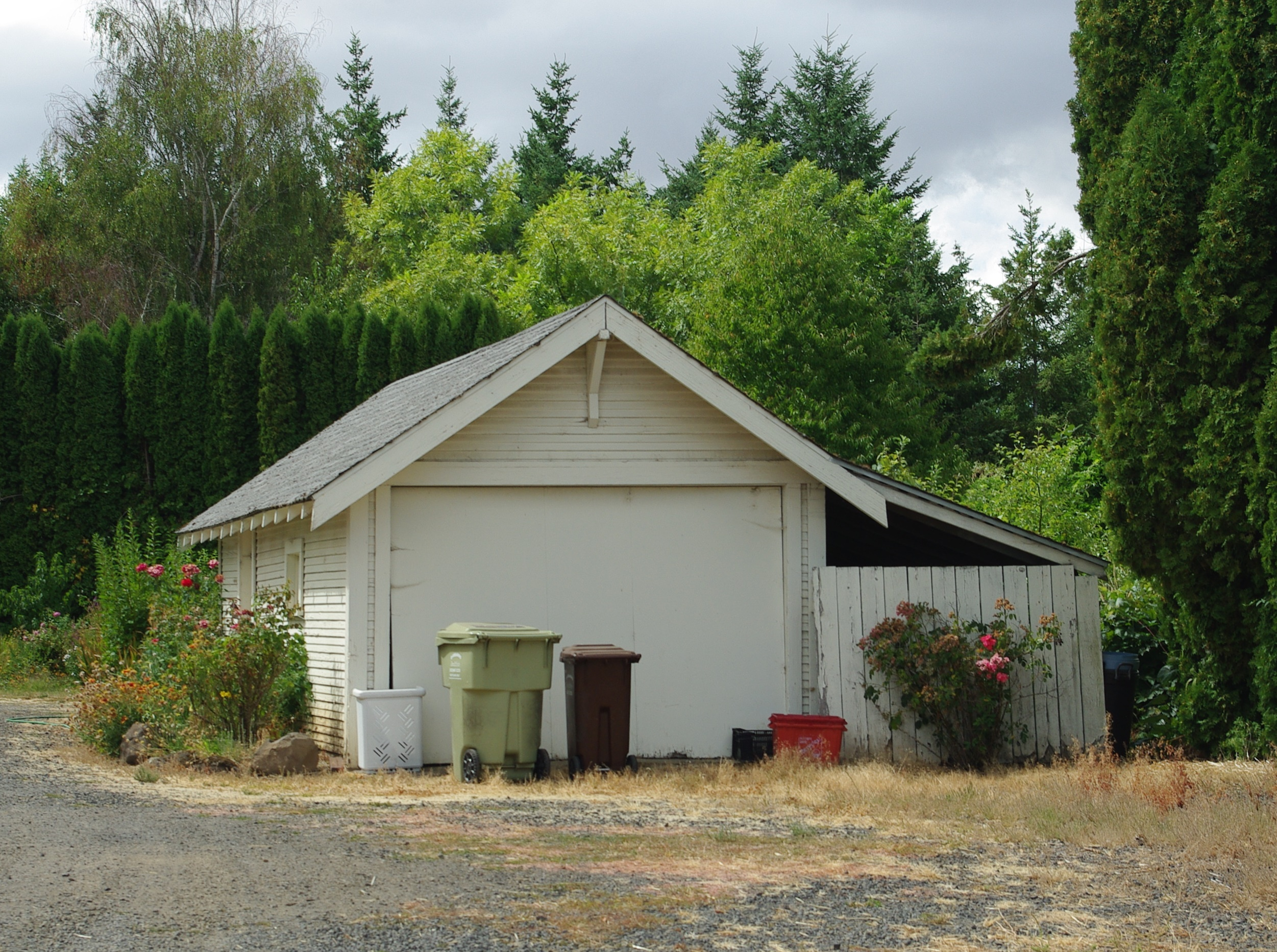
