= Aloha Farmhouse =

Historic house in Oregon, United States

- U.S. National Register of Historic Places
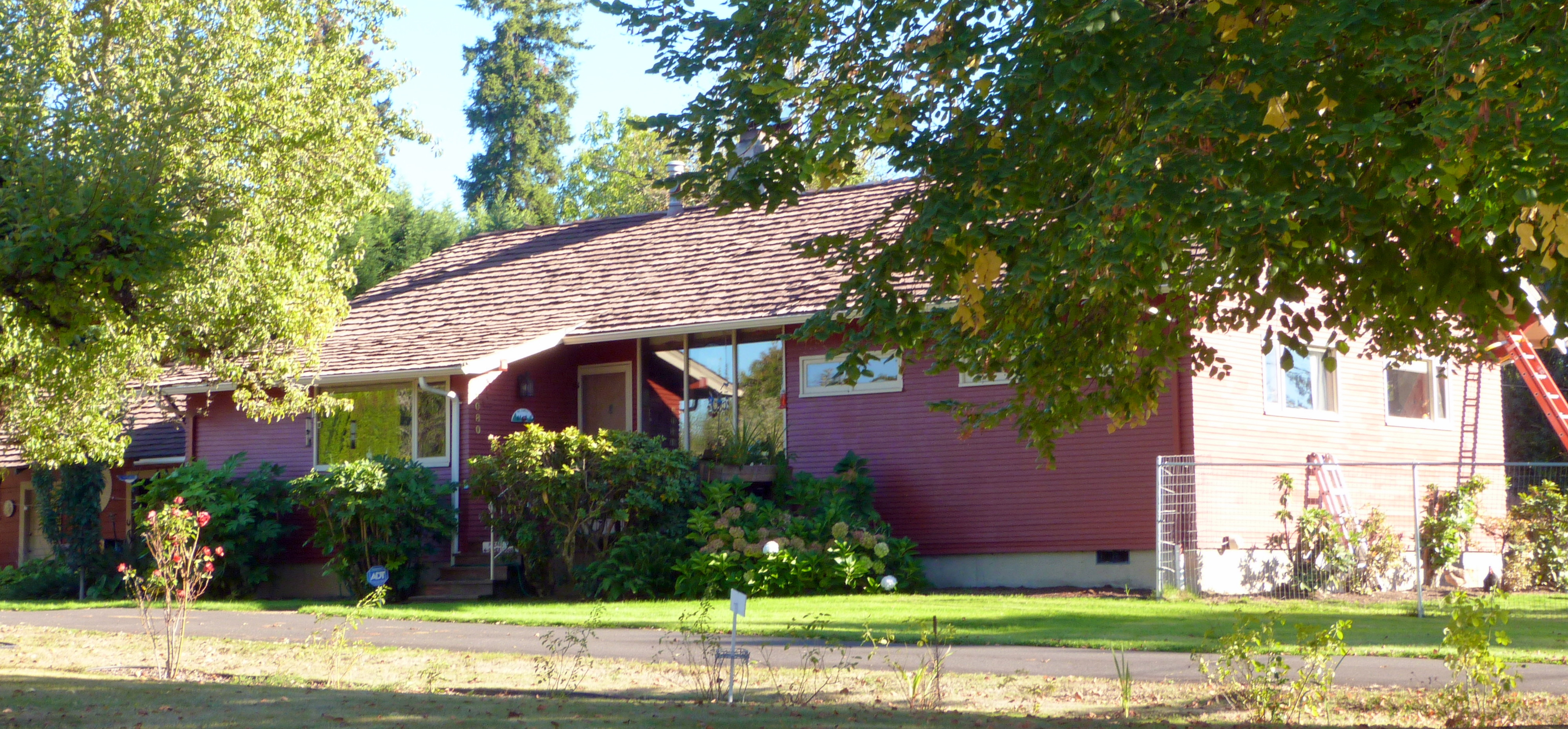
- The house in 2014

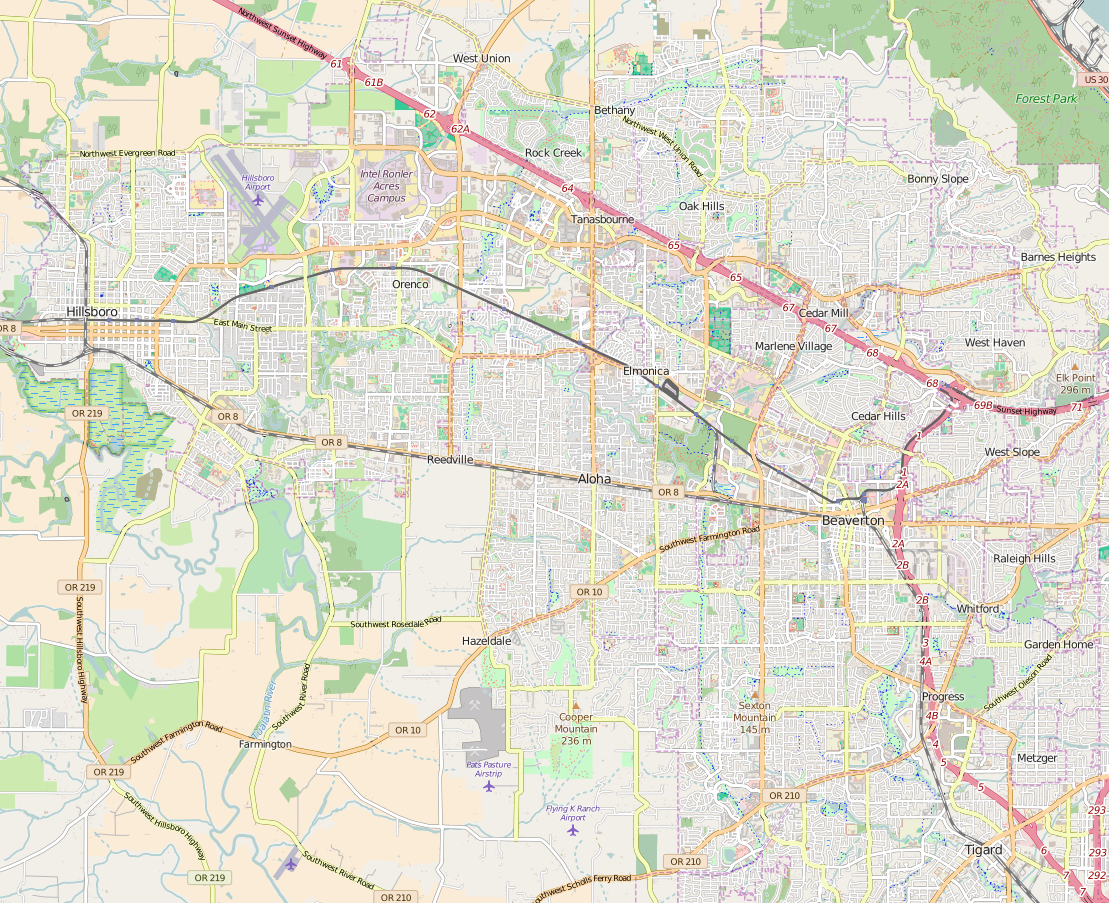
- Location within Hillsboro Beaverton OR
- Location: 1080 SW 197th Avenue; Aloha, Oregon, United States
- Coordinates: 45.512°N 122.879°W
- Built: 1915
- NRHP reference No.: 14000812

The Aloha Farmhouse is a Craftsman-inspired residence located in Aloha, Oregon, United States, listed on the National Register of Historic Places. The one-story house was built in 1915, and architect Pietro Belluschi remodeled the building twice, first in 1944 and again in 1946. The Belluschis moved from the home in 1948 and sold the property. It was added to the National Register of Historic Places in September 2015.

== Details ==
The eastern section of the house was originally a storage building connected via the roof during the remodel by Pietro Belluschi in 1944. A barn was moved from a nearby property in 1980, with an office added to it on the second story. The main part of the house includes a partial basement that is unfinished. Overall, the residence has 1,516 square feet (140.8 m^{2}) of space.
