= Clark Historic District =

Historic district in Oregon, United States

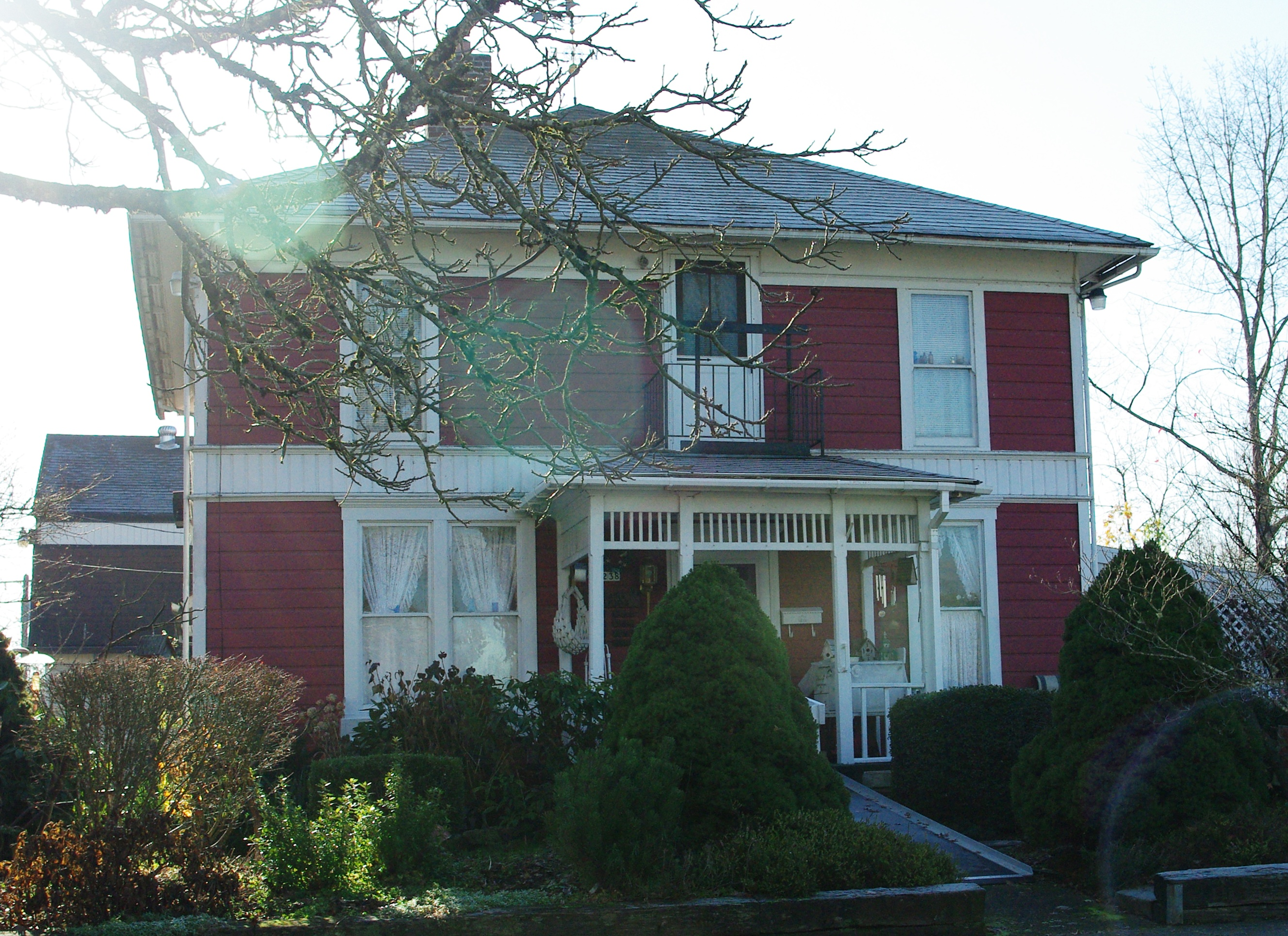

The Clark Historic District, located in Forest Grove, Oregon, is listed on the National Register of Historic Places. It is a roughly rectangular area with irregular borders of 19th and 16th Avenues on the north and south, and A and Elm Streets on the west and east. It contains 178 historic sites, and the area is named after the Reverend Harvey Clark and his wife, Emeline.

The Clark National Historic District was created south of downtown Forest Grove in 2002. Central School is on the west edge, Rogers Park on the east edge. The area is residential with a scattering of churches. Much of the land where the Clark Historic District stands was donated to Tualatin Academy by Clark as an endowment. The land was originally platted into one-acre lots. The land was purchased and houses were built for local residents in a wide variety of occupations. This variety translated into a spectrum of architectural styles from Second Empire to Bungalow.

== See also ==
- National Register of Historic Places listings in Washington County, Oregon
