= Alvin T. Smith =

American judge

- Portrait of Smith

Probate Judge of Washington County, Oregon
- In office 1851
- Constituency: Washington County

Magistrate for the Provisional Government of Oregon
- In office 1843–1844
- Constituency: Twality District

Personal details
- Born: November 17, 1802 Branford, Connecticut, U.S.
- Died: January 22, 1888 (aged 85) Forest Grove, Oregon, U.S.
- Spouse(s): Abigail Raymond (1840-1858); Jane Averill (1869-1888)
- Occupation: carpenter

Alvin Thompson Smith (November 17, 1802 – January 22, 1888) was an American missionary and politician in what became the state of Oregon. A native of Connecticut, he lived in Illinois before moving to the Oregon Country to preach to the Native Americans in the Tualatin Valley. There he served in both the Provisional Government of Oregon and the government of the Oregon Territory, as well as helping to establish Tualatin Academy, later becoming Pacific University. Smith's former home, the Alvin T. Smith House in Forest Grove, is listed on the National Register of Historic Places.

== Early years ==
Alvin Thompson Smith was born in Branford, Connecticut, on November 17, 1802, to Thomas Smith. In the early 1830s he moved to Quincy, Illinois, where he worked as a carpenter and where he married Abigail Raymond (born April 21, 1793) on March 19, 1840. In 1840, he and his new wife crossed the Great Plains on what became the Oregon Trail with P. B. Littlejohn and the Reverend Harvey L. Clark and their wives, along with fur traders. They left in March after Smith had heard a speech about a group of Native Americans who had traveled to St. Louis, Missouri, and asked to learn about Christianity. Clark and Littlejohn invited him to help establish a mission independent of the American Board of Commissioners for Foreign Missions.

== Oregon ==
The group traveled first to Independence, Missouri, where they were joined by frontiersman Henry Black before heading west. Along the trail they caught up to a fur brigade of the American Fur Company at Hickory Grove and joined the group that included Joel Walker, Pleasant Armstrong, and Robert Moore among others. This larger group continued on to the Rocky Mountain Rendezvous where the Oregon bound missionaries continued on with guidance from Caleb Wilkins and Robert Newell to Fort Hall where they abandoned their wagons and traded their cattle for Mexican cattle to be delivered once in the Willamette Valley. Smith and the group continued on to the Whitman Mission, arriving on August 14, 1840.

After arriving in the Oregon Country in September, the group wintered at Henry H. Spalding’s mission in what is now Eastern Washington. At the mission Smith assisted in building saw mills, a grist mill, and what was the first spinning wheel and loom in what became the Oregon Territory. He remained for nearly a year before leaving in September 1841 for the Willamette Valley.

Smith settled on the Tualatin Plains near what became Forest Grove, Oregon. He and his wife were the first permanent Euro-American settlers at what would become Forest Grove. There he built a log cabin on his 643 acres (260 ha) farm and later donated to Tabitha Moffatt Brown's orphan school in 1845 that grew to become Tualatin Academy and then Pacific University. The couple's first cabin was lost to a flood, but they built a new log cabin on the farmstead.

== Political career ==
In May 1843, he participated in the Champoeg Meetings where pioneers debated on whether to create an independent government for the Oregon Country prior to the settlement of the Oregon boundary dispute. At the meetings, Smith voted for the creation of the Provisional Government of Oregon and was elected as a magistrate for the Twality District, now Washington County. Smith was appointed by the Provisional Legislature of Oregon as a road viewer for a proposed road from the Willamette Falls to the Tualatin Plains in 1844. In 1851, he was elected as the probate judge for Washington County and received his commission from Territorial Governor John P. Gaines on July 3, 1851.

== Later years ==
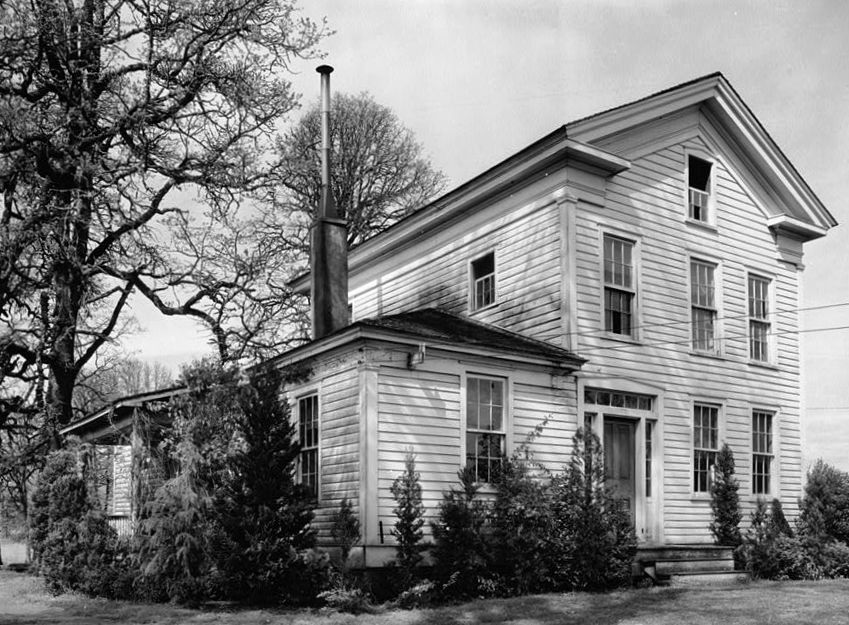
Smith's home in later years

Smith volunteered in 1848 to fight in the Cayuse War that broke out after the Whitman Massacre, but was never called up for service. In 1851, Smith was appointed postmaster of West Tualatin, now Forest Grove, serving in that position until 1855, with his wife assisting. The post office was located in the Smith's log cabin, and was the first post office in the county. In 1856, he completed building a new two-story frame home, which was added to the National Register of Historic Places on November 8, 1974, as the Alvin T. Smith House.

On April 17, 1858, his wife Abigail died, and later that year Smith assisted in building the Forest Grove Congregational Meeting House in September. Smith remarried on October 19, 1869, eleven years after his first wife died. Smith traveled home where he married Jane Averill from his hometown of Branford, Connecticut, before returning to Oregon and his farm. He and Jane moved into Forest Grove proper in 1870, but continued to own the farm and old home. Alvin Thompson Smith died on January 22, 1888, in Forest Grove at the age of 85 and was buried at Mountain View Memorial Gardens in that city.
