= Tualatin =

Tualatin may refer to:

== Places ==
=== Oregon, United States ===
- Tualatin, Oregon, a city in the Tualatin Valley
- Tualatin Academy, a building and former school in Forest Grove
- Tuality Community Hospital, a hospital in Hillsboro
- Tualatin Mountains, a section of the Oregon Coast Range
- Tualatin Plains, a lowland section of the Tualatin Valley
- Tualatin River, a tributary of the Willamette River
- Tualatin Station, a commuter rail station in Tualatin
- Tualatin Valley, the region surrounding the Tualatin River
- Tualatin Valley Highway, a state highway
- Tualatin Valley Fire and Rescue, a regional fire district

== Other uses ==
- Tualatin (people), a part of the Kalapuya Native American tribe in western Oregon, US
- Tualatin (microprocessor), the final generation of Intel's Pentium III processor

== See also ==
- Tualatin Plains Presbyterian Church, a church near Hillsboro
