= Alvin T. Smith House =

Historic house in Oregon, United States

- U.S. National Register of Historic Places
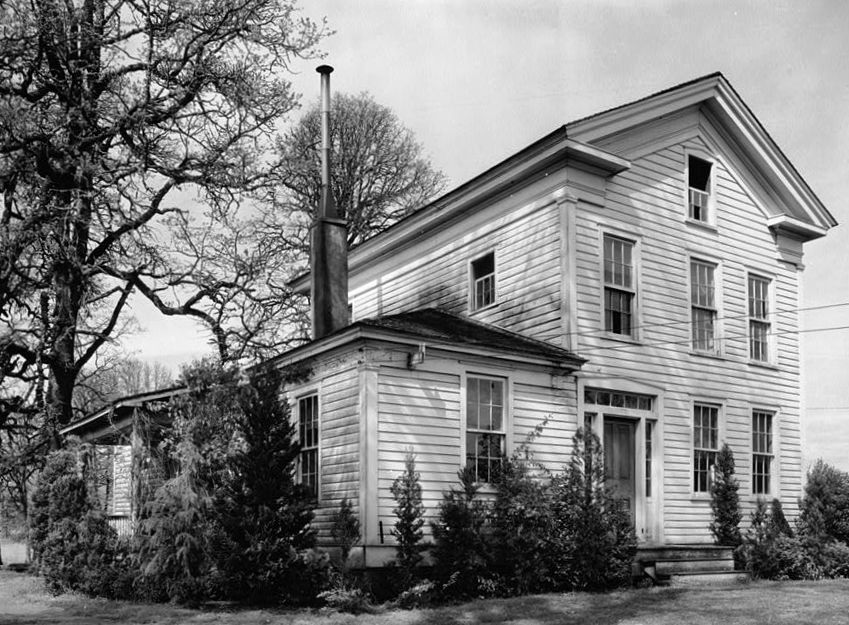
- Front of house in 1934
- Location: Forest Grove, Oregon, USA
- Coordinates: 45°30′15″N 123°6′14″W
- Built: 1854-1856
- Architectural style: Greek Revival style
- NRHP reference No.: 74001721
- Added to NRHP: November 8, 1974

The Alvin T. Smith House is a two-story home on Elm Street in Forest Grove, Oregon, United States. Completed in 1856, it is the second oldest building in the city and was added to the National Register of Historic Places in 1974. A Greek Revival style house, it was built by pioneer Alvin T. Smith beginning in 1854.

== History ==
Alvin Smith settled on a 643 acres (260 ha) farm on the Tualatin Plains south of what became West Tuality Plains in 1841. He and his wife were the first permanent Euro-American settlers in the area that would later become Forest Grove. An earlier cabin on the property was destroyed in a flood, and their second cabin later became a post office. In 1854, he and his wife Abigail began the construction of a new home. Alvin was a trained carpenter and did the work himself. Construction finished in 1856, and is the second oldest wood-framed building in Forest Grove after Old College Hall at Pacific University. Abigail died in 1858, with Alvin continuing to live in the home with his second wife Jane until 1870. The couple moved to downtown Forest Grove, but continued to own the property.

Alvin died in 1888, and Jane leased the house until around 1920 when she died.

The Alvin T. Smith House was one of only two structures in Forest Grove that were documented for the Historic American Buildings Survey (HABS) in the 1930s.

The next owner sold the estate to the Zurcher family circa 1940. Alvin T. Smith House was listed on the National Register of Historic Places on November 8, 1974. The house was abandoned around 1990.

In 2002, the Friends of Historic Forest Grove began plans to purchase the home and restore it. The group worked with the Oregon Historic Preservation Office to purchase the property. In 2005, a methamphetamine lab was removed from the basement and the house decontaminated. In March 2005, the group purchased the home for $75,000 after raising $175,000, with some of the funds raised through a calendar featuring nude members at the house. Long-term plans call for turning the property into a center for learning about the cultural heritage of the area.

In 2015 the A.T. Smith House was named one of Oregon's Most Endangered Places by Restore Oregon.

== Details ==
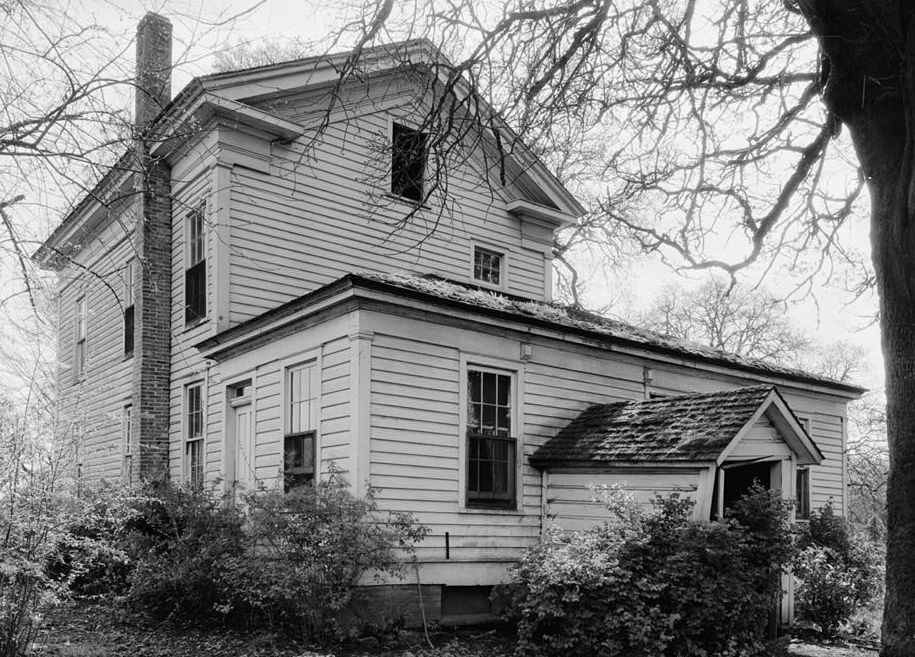
Back of home in 1934

The home sits on a 2.2 acres (1 ha) site on the south side of Forest Grove off Oregon Route 47, in what was once the town of Carnation.

Smith House is of a classical Greek Revival design with a side hall floor plan. The gabled side serves as the front of the structure. The two-story building includes a basement. The basement consists of stone walls with brick on the top as the foundation. The basement remained cool and was utilized as storage for perishables such as fruit and vegetables.

Above ground, rough-hewn logs were used, as were wooden pegs to hold the timbers in place. Smith hewed the timber by hand using a broad ax. On the main floor there are multiple doors between the same room to allow for church meetings. There were no church buildings in the early days of the community, so religious services were held in private homes. The home has wood floors, with two bedrooms on the second floor. All the windows are partitioned windows. Most of the original structure remains.

== Namesake ==
Alvin Thompson Smith (1802–1888) was born in Connecticut and moved to the Oregon Country in 1840. The next year he moved to the Tualatin Plains near what became Forest Grove. There he represented the area at the Champoeg Meetings in 1843 and helped support Tualatin Academy and to found Pacific University. Smith was postmaster from 1851 to 1855.
