= Daniel Gault =

American politician

Member of the Oregon House of Representatives
- In office 1876–1878; 1903–1905
- Constituency: Washington County

Member of the Oregon House of Representatives
- In office 1882–1884
- Constituency: Multnomah County

Personal details
- Born: May 8, 1842 Davis County, Iowa
- Died: April 20, 1912 (aged 69) Oregon
- Resting place: Hillsboro Pioneer Cemetery
- Party: Republican
- Spouse(s): Anna Rebecca Howell; Lydia E. Humphrey
- Education: Tualatin Academy

Daniel M. C. Gault (May 8, 1842 – April 20, 1912) was a newspaperman, educator and politician in the U.S. state of Oregon. A native of Iowa, he immigrated to the Oregon Territory with his family as a child where he became a teacher in several locales. A Republican, he served three terms in the Oregon Legislative Assembly over a period of nearly 30 years. He also worked for several newspapers and founded two others.

== Early life ==
Daniel Gault was born on May 8, 1842, in Davis County, Iowa, along the border with Missouri. He was the one of five children of John Gault, a farmer and carpenter, and Lucy McClein. Daniel's father was from Massachusetts and his mother from Kentucky. In 1852, the family moved to the Oregon Territory to a farm eight miles southwest of Portland, near what was then Tigardville.

== Oregon ==
In Oregon, Gault received his education at Tualatin Academy in Forest Grove. His mother died in 1858 and his father in 1861, and at that time Gault began a long career as a teacher, first in Walla Walla, Washington. In 1865, he started in the newspaper field as the editor of the Jacksonville Sentinel, continuing until 1868. While editor, he also read law for the three years he was in the Southern Oregon community of Jacksonville. In 1867, he married Anna Rebecca Howell, and they had two daughters, Elizabeth and Mary. The family then moved to Salem and worked for the Daily Statesman for one year. While in Salem, he also taught mathematics at Willamette University.

Gault followed this by starting his own paper in Dallas, Oregon, in 1869. He sold the Polk County Republican in 1870 and resumed teaching school, this time in Yamhill County. That year his wife died, and in 1872 he moved north to Hillsboro where he continued working as a teacher until 1880. In 1878, he married a second time to Lydia E. Humphrey, and the marriage produced two sons, John and William. Humphrey's sister Julia married poet Samuel L. Simpson.

Gault left Hillsboro in 1880 and moved to the Halliday area of Portland and taught two years in there before moving to a farm outside the city. During this time he also worked for the Portland News. He continued teaching until 1892 when he returned to the newspaper industry as part owner and editor of the Hillsboro Independent. In January 1903, he left the newspaper and started a printing company in Salem with one of his sons. The Gault Printing Company was moved to Cottage Grove in 1905 where the Gaults established a newspaper, the Western Oregon. They sold the paper and printing company to J. C. Howard three years later, with Howard then starting the Cottage Grove Sentinel.

== Political career ==
Gault entered public service in 1874 when he was elected as superintendent of public schools in Washington County, serving one four-year term and leaving office in 1878. In 1876, he was elected to a two-year term in the Oregon House of Representatives as a Republican to serve Washington County and District 56. From 1879 to 1880 he served on Hillsboro's Board of Trustees, now known as the city council. In 1882, Gault returned to the Oregon House, this time representing District 45 and Multnomah County. He only served the one term each of his first two stints in the legislature. Gault was elected one final time in 1902, and served in the 1903 sessions as Washington County's representative from House District 15.

== Later years ==
In March 1908, Gault was appointed as the postmaster of Cottage Grove, a position he retained until he died in 1912. His wife served as his deputy during this time at the post office. In civic affairs he was a member of the Congregational church, the Independent Order of Odd Fellows, and the Ancient Order of United Workmen. Daniel Gault died on April 20, 1912, in Cottage Grove and was buried at the Hillsboro Pioneer Cemetery.
