= Forest Grove Sound =

Unexplained sound found in Forest Grove, Oregon

Coordinates: 45°31′11″N 123°6′38″W

External videos
- News report by KOIN 6
- "Mysterious Forest Grove noise puzzles neighbors" on YouTube

The Forest Grove Sound was an unexplained noise, described by The Oregonian as a "mechanical scream", heard in Forest Grove, Oregon, in February 2016.

In February 2016, a high-pitched noise was heard intermittently at night in Forest Grove, Oregon. The Department of Forestry determined that their equipment was not the cause of the sound. The news about the noise was first shared with Dave Nemeyer by a Forest Grove resident, who posted a video of it on the city's Facebook page. The Washington Post described the noise as sounding like a "giant flute played off pitch", car brakes, or a steam whistle. NBC News described it as "akin to a bad one-note violin solo broadcast over a microphone with nonstop feedback". It reportedly lasted from ten seconds to several minutes at a time. The fire department of Forest Grove did not consider the sound to be a safety risk. The noise occurred near Gales Creek Road. Neither the City of Forest Grove Public Works Department nor the Fire Department were able to explain the noise. According to NW Natural, there were no problems with gas lines in Forest Grove at the time. In February 2016, Andrew Dawes, a professor of physics at Pacific University, mapped the locations where the noise had been heard, although the results were inconclusive and did not suggest any single location.

Throughout February 2016, approximately 200 calls were made to the Forest Grove Police Department, according to Captain Mike Herb, who said that most of the calls were suggesting explanations for the sound, ranging from frogs to aliens to Bigfoot. In late February 2016, the Forest Grove Police Department announced via Facebook that the noise did not pose a safety hazard, and the police announced they were halting their investigation until further information appeared. However, after February 2016, the noise was not heard. The final point was plotted on Dawes' map on February 27, 2016, and the police and fire departments closed the case. Dave Nemeyer, the Forest Grove Fire Marshal, suspected the noise to be "a faulty attic fan or heat pump".

In October 2016, Theatre in the Grove, a performing arts theatre in Forest Grove, created a haunted house based on the Forest Grove noise called "Aliens in the Grove".
