= George Henry Atkinson =

George Henry Atkinson may refer to

- George Atkinson (safety) (born 1947), American football safety
- George Atkinson III (1992–2019), American football running back
- George H. Atkinson (1819–1889), American missionary and educator
