= Tabitha Brown =

Tabitha Brown may refer to:

- Tabitha Moffatt Brown (1780–1858), American pioneer
- Tabitha Brown (actress) (born 1979), American actress and social media personality
