= Mike Clock =

American coach (1935–2026)

Biographical details
- Born: November 17, 1935; Forest Grove, Oregon, U.S.
- Died: July 25, 2026 (aged 90); Vancouver, Washington, U.S.
- Education: Pacific University

Head coaching record
- Overall: 18 Northwest Conference Titles

Accomplishments and honors

Awards
- NAIA National Wrestling Coaches Hall of Fame (1988); Pacific University Athletic Hall of Fame (1993); National Wrestling Hall of Fame - Oregon Chapter (2004)

Michael Clyde Clock (November 17, 1935 – July 26, 2026) was an American wrestling coach and mathematics professor at Pacific University for 35 years. He served as the chair of the mathematics department.

== Early life and career ==
Michael Clyde Clock was born in Forest Grove, Oregon on November 17, 1935. He studied at Newberg High School in Newberg. He began his wrestling career in 1951 and won the 1953 Oregon state heavyweight wrestling championship.

Clock began his teaching career by teaching mathematics, coaching football and wrestling at Tigard High School and Sunset High School in Oregon. He then served three seasons as head wrestling coach at Lewis & Clark College, before joining the faculty at Pacific University in 1967. He served as the university head wrestling coach for 23 seasons, from 1966 to 1988 and from 1991 to 1992. during his coaching term, the team won 18 Northwest Conference team championships, including 16 titles from 1970 until 1984. He chaired the NAIA's Cultural Exchange Committee for 12 years. In 2003, Pacific University renamed its annual open wrestling tournament the Mike Clock Open in his honor.

== Personal life and death ==
In 1955, Clock was married to Carol Clock, they had four children's together, Thom, Paul, Mary Clock, and Kathryn Barlow. Carol later died from cancer in 1980.

Clock died in Vancouver, Washington on July 25, 2026, at the age of 90.
