= Genevieve Springston Lynch =

American painter

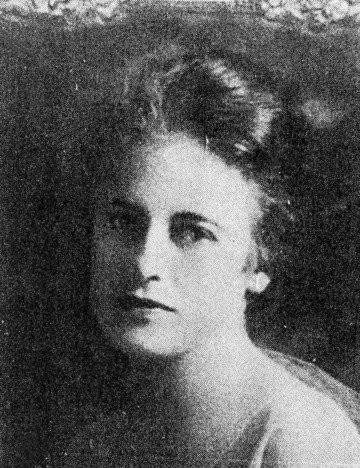
- Anonymous photo c. 1916
- Born: Genevieve Springston; 1891
- Died: 1960 (aged 68–69)
- Education: Pratt Institute
- Known for: Painting
- Spouse: L.L. Lynch

Genevieve Springston Lynch (1891–1960), also known as Gene Lynch, was an American painter and art teacher who taught and worked in Hawaii.

== Background ==
Genevieve Springston was born in Forest Grove, Oregon on September 20, 1891. She studied art at the Pratt Institute in New York and at an art school in Chicago. She taught art at Punahou School, a private school in Honolulu, both before and following her marriage to L. L. Lynch, an executive with Lewers & Cooke, Ltd.

== Career ==
Genevieve Springston Lynch, Cup-and-Saucer Flowers, c. 1940, Honolulu Museum of Art

Lynch was invited to have a solo show in Paris in 1935. Because of prejudice against female artists, she shortened her professional name and signature to "Gene Lynch". She exhibited in the 1939 Society of Independent Artists show. When Genevieve and her husband retired, they moved to Palo Alto, California, where she continued to paint until her death in 1960.

She is considered to be one of the notable artists of Hawaii that created "distinctly Hawaiian" art, while also using western approaches or materials. Genevieve Springston Lynch is best known for her stylized paintings of exotic plants, such as Cup-and-Saucer Flowers in the collection of the Honolulu Museum of Art.
