= George H. Atkinson =

American missionary and educator

George Henry Atkinson
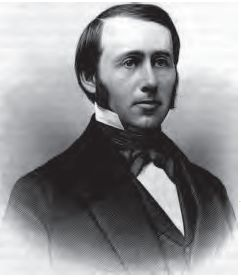
- George Atkinson in his early years.
- Born: May 10, 1819; Newburyport, Massachusetts, U.S.
- Died: February 25, 1889 (aged 69); Portland, Oregon, U.S.
- Education: Andover Theological Seminary
- Spouse: Nancy Bates
- Church: Congregational
- Offices held: Superintendent of Missions of Congregational Churches of Oregon and Washington Territory

George Henry Atkinson (May 10, 1819 – February 25, 1889) was an American missionary and educator in what would become the state of Oregon. In Oregon, he served as a pastor for several churches, helped found what would become Pacific University, and pushed for legislation to create a public school system in Oregon Territory. The Massachusetts native later served as the county schools superintendent in Clackamas County and Multnomah counties.

== Early life ==
The Reverend George Atkinson was born on May 10, 1819, in Newburyport, Massachusetts. After attending Bradford Academy and Newbury Academies, he then moved to Hanover, New Hampshire. There he attended Dartmouth College where he graduated in 1843. Atkinson then received religious training at the Andover Theological Seminary, graduating in 1846. He married Nancy Bates that same year. On February 24, 1847, George Atkinson was ordained as a Congregational minister and then sent with his wife as a missionary to Oregon Country. The couple sailed on the ship Samoset around South America's Cape Horn to the Sandwich Islands. From there they voyaged on the vessel Cowlitz to the Columbia River where they arrived in 1848.

== Oregon ==
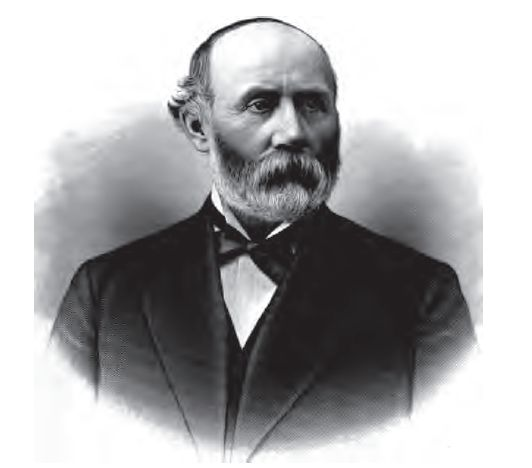
Portrait of Atkinson in later years

Upon arrival the family settled at Oregon City, Oregon as the first Oregon missionary sent by the American Home Missionary Society On June 21, 1848, Atkinson was given charge of the Congregationalist Church in Oregon City, which would not build a church building until 1850. In January 1849 he then helped organize the First Congregational Society of Oregon City. The church would later become the Atkinson Memorial Congregational Church. George Atkinson would serve as minister for 15 years at the church, and helped to found the Clackamas County Female Seminary. He also helped to found Tualatin Academy in Forest Grove along with Tabitha Moffatt Brown and Harvey L. Clark. Atkinson had been given instructions by the missionary board to start an academy before leaving for Oregon. The school was incorporated on September 29, 1849, and Atkinson served as a trustee of the school that would later become Pacific University.

Also in 1849, Atkinson pushed for laws to create public schools, earning him the title of "Father of Oregon schools" by educators. He proposed that education should be at no cost to students with financial support coming through taxes, a permanent fund to provide financing should be established, control of the schools should be at the local level, the schools should allow religious freedom, and teachers should be certified to meet professional standards. Once public education laws were passed, George Atkinson became the first superintendent of schools in Clackamas County. In 1865, he moved to Portland and became the pastor of the First Congregational Church as well as school superintendent for Multnomah County.

== Later life ==
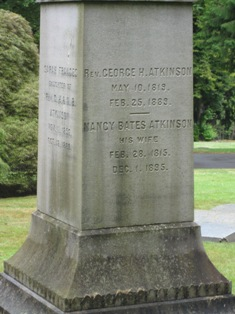
Gravemarker

In 1872, George Atkinson left his church to begin missionary work. By 1880 he was named as Superintendent of Missions of Congregational Churches of Oregon and Washington Territory. With this he traveled throughout the region, and is credited with coining the phrase "Inland Empire" to describe eastern regions of Oregon and Washington. In 1885, his district was split, and Atkinson remained in charge of the Oregon section until his death in Portland on February 25, 1889.
