= John Smith Griffin =

American missionary

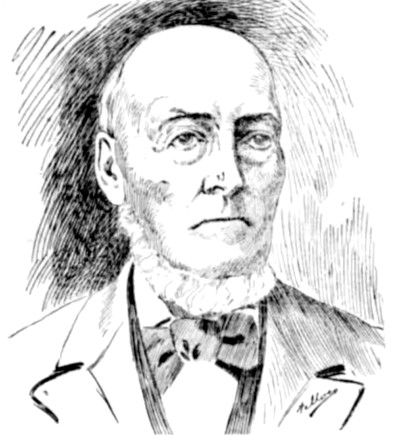

Participant at the Champoeg Meetings
- In office 1843–1843
- Constituency: Tualatin Plains

Personal details
- Born: November 23, 1807 Castleton, Vermont, US
- Died: February 5, 1899 (aged 91) Oregon, US
- Resting place: Hillsboro Pioneer Cemetery; 45.52043°N 123.00582°W
- Spouse(s): Desire C. Smith (d. 1884); Lina Harvey Kenyon

John Smith Griffin (1807–1899) was an American missionary in Oregon Country who participated at the Champoeg Meetings that created the Provisional Government of Oregon in 1843. In Oregon he served as a tutor at Fort Vancouver and later organized a church on the Tualatin Plains in the Tualatin Valley.

== Early life ==
On November 23, 1807, John Griffin was born in Castleton, Vermont, to parents who immigrated from England. In New England and Ohio he received an education in both the schools and seminaries. Griffin was then ordained a minister and sent to Litchfield County, Connecticut. His church, the Congregational Church, then sent him as an unaffiliated missionary to Oregon Country to convert Native Americans.

== Oregon ==
Griffin arrived in Oregon in 1839 and stayed at the Whitman Mission the first year before moving to the Hudson's Bay Company's Fort Vancouver on the Columbia River. Staying until 1841, he tutored children of the fort and served as the post's chaplain. In 1841 he settled on the Tualatin Plains in what is now Washington County, Oregon, where he would establish a church on June 26, 1842. He had planned on setting up a mission on the east side of the Cascade Mountains, but did not receive funds from the missionary board and instead set up a farm in the Tualatin Valley. From the time he settled there until 1848 Griffin kept a journal of the arrivals of settlers on the Tualatin Plains. The church was the first church on the plains there, established at East Tuality Plains. Members of the church included Joseph L. Meek, George W. Ebbert, Joseph Gale, and Charles Richard McKay among others. Griffin continued as minister of the congregation until the parishioners removed him in 1845 because of his rigid beliefs, replacing him with Harvey L. Clark. While living on the plains Griffin set up his own personal jail in order to detain Native Americans who would steal from him.

In 1843, Griffin attended the meetings at Champoeg on the Willamette River where he opposed the type of resolution introduced at the May third meeting. Though opposing the type of measure, he did vote for the creation of the Provisional Government in what was a 52-to-50 vote in favor of the formation of a government. This temporary government continued until the government of the Oregon Territory was formed in 1849, after the region south of the 49th parallel north became part of the United States. In 1848, Griffin took possession of the Oregon Mission Press and began printing The Oregon American and Evangelical Unionist. In 1851, Griffin invested in the Portland & Valley Plank Road Company, which began building a plank road from Portland to the Tualatin Valley.

== Family ==
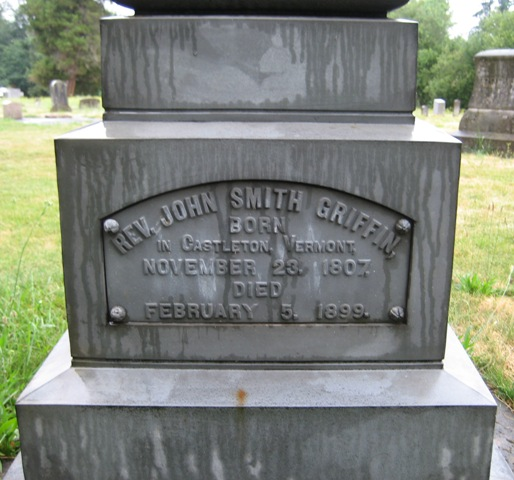
Griffin's grave marker

In 1839, Griffin was married in Saint Louis, Missouri, to Desiré C. Smith, who would die in 1884. He then married Lina Harvey Kenyon in Three Oaks, Michigan.
