= Old Scotch Church =

Historic church in Oregon, United States

- U.S. National Register of Historic Places
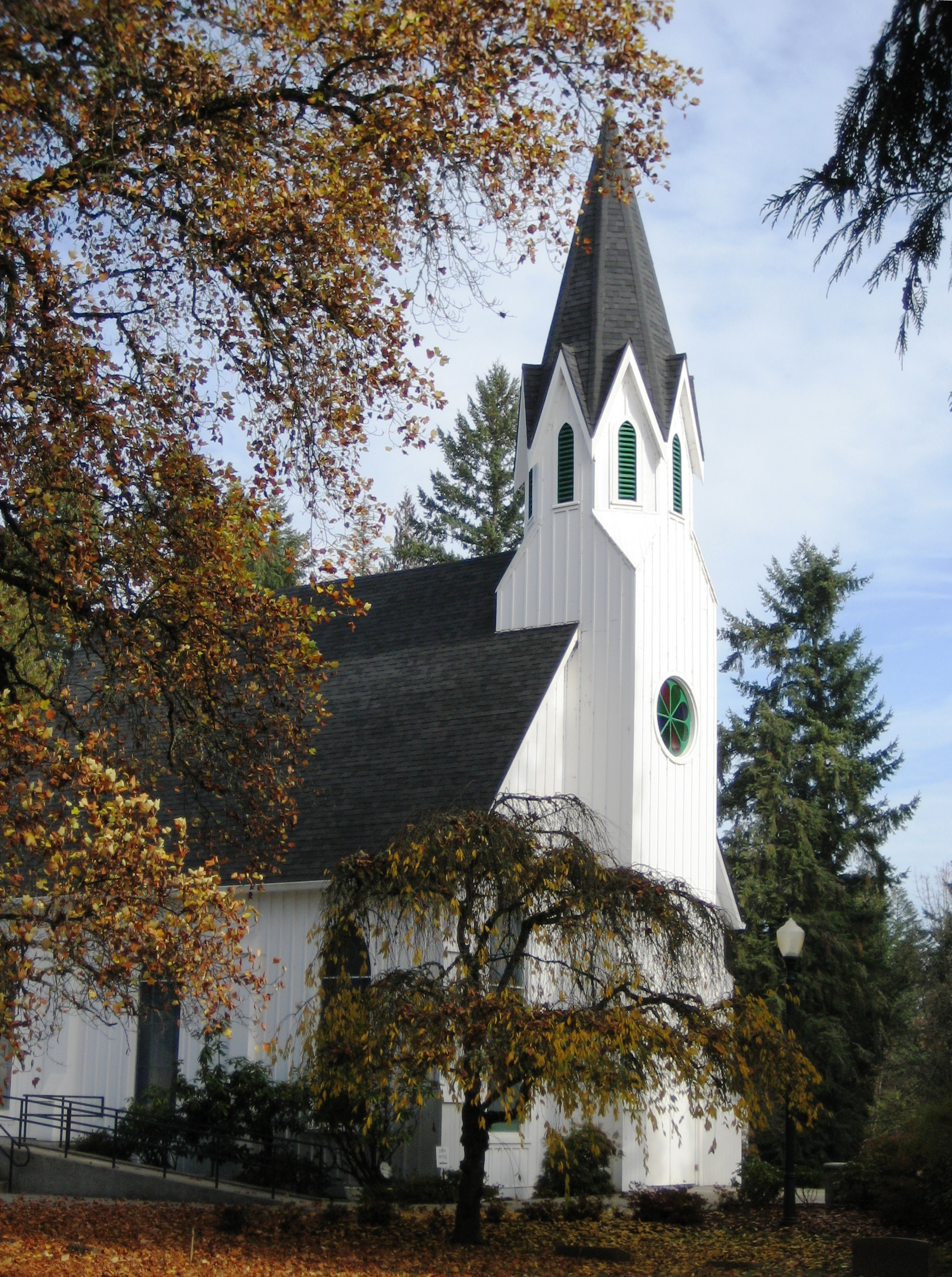
- Eight-sided steeple of the Old Scotch Church

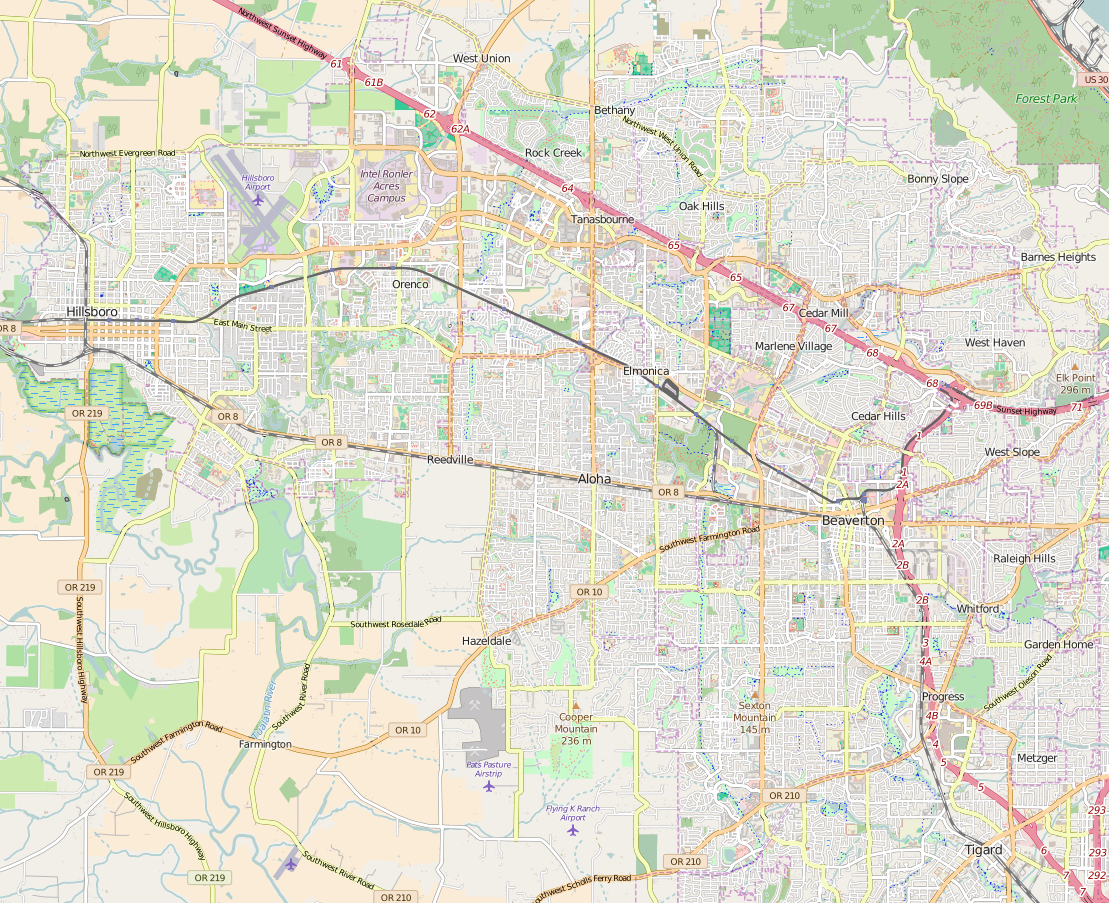
- Location within Hillsboro Beaverton OR
- Location: Scotch Church Rd., Washington County, Oregon, near Hillsboro, Oregon
- Coordinates: 45°34′22″N 122°59′39″W
- Built: 1878
- Architectural style: Carpenter Gothic
- NRHP reference No.: 74001723
- Added to NRHP: November 5, 1974

The Old Scotch Church, also known as the Tualatin Plains Presbyterian Church, is a church and national historic site located in an unincorporated part of Washington County, Oregon, near Hillsboro, Oregon, United States. The church dates to 1873 while the church structure with an eight-sided steeple dates to 1878. A cemetery on the church grounds holds the graves of church members and local pioneer settlers of the Tualatin Plains, including Joseph Meek.

== Organization ==
The Tualatin Plains Presbyterian Church was organized in 1873 with the first service on November 16. This first service was held at the four-room Columbia Academy schoolhouse with the Reverend George Ross as pastor, four miles (6 km) northwest of the present site. Services were held at the academy until a permanent site for construction of a house of worship could be located by the congregation.

These first members of the congregation came primarily from the same area in Aberdeenshire, Scotland, which is located west of Aberdeen. In Scotland, they had been members of the Free Church of Scotland. After immigrating to the United States and traveling to Oregon, they settled near each other in the Tualatin Valley. Because of the settlers' Scottish origin, their church building acquired its common name "The Old Scotch Church." The twelve original Scottish pioneers were: Mr. and Mrs. William Chalmers and their 11 children, their youngest Catherine was the first buried there. Mr. and Mrs. James Smith, Rev. and Mrs. George Ross, Mr. and Mrs. George Alexander, their daughter Eliza, Miss Alexander and John Milne. Eight of the twelve founders and many of their descendants are buried in the cemetery surrounding the church.

== Structure ==
In 1876, one acre (4,000 m^{2}) of land was donated to the church by Jacob Hoover to provide a place for a permanent church building and cemetery. On March 11, 1878, the church board began the process of building a permanent building by authorizing an estimate to determine the costs of building a church structure. An estimate of $2120 was completed for a Carpenter Gothic-style building in early 1878. The architect for the structure was Mr. Balantyne. His design included buttresses, stained glass windows, a steep roof, and the signature eight-sided steeple. Construction commenced with much of the material and labor being donated by the congregation. The stained glass windows in the building were imported from Scotland. The church building, adjacent to McKay Creek, was completed in 1878 and dedicated that same year. A church bell was added in 1926 to the steeple.

=== Expansions ===
In 1905, the church was expanded when an annex was built onto the back of the building, adding additional classrooms for Sunday school. Then in 1940 the annex was expanded and a half-basement added, followed by a second addition in 1955 that included the first indoor restrooms at the church. From 1959 to 1960 the building was raised, allowing for a full basement to by completed. In 1984 construction was completed that added four classrooms to the church structure .

== Cemetery ==
Many pioneers of the Oregon Country are also buried in the cemetery. Joseph Meek is one of the best known of those buried at the Old Scotch Church. Meek died on June 20, 1875, and was originally buried at his homestead, located near a historic marker dedicated to him along the Sunset Highway. Meek was a mountain man, a member of Oregon's Provisional Government, and the first U.S. Marshall of the Oregon Territory. After his land was sold, his remains were moved and re-interred at the church's cemetery. The cemetery also contains a cairn added in 1985 as a memorial to ancestors in Scotland who were massacred at Glen Coe in 1692.

== Currently ==
This structure is one of the oldest continuously used churches in the state. The church was the 13th historical site in Washington County, Oregon, to be honored. On November 5, 1974, the church was added to the National Register of Historic Places as the Old Scotch Church. The Tualatin Plains Presbyterian Church still holds services in the Old Scotch Church building every Sunday.
