= Harvey L. Clark =

Harvey L. Clarke

Participant at the Champoeg Meetings
- In office 1843–1843
- Constituency: Tualatin Plains

Chaplain of the Provisional Legislature of Oregon
- In office 1845–1845

Personal details
- Born: October 2, 1807 Chester, Vermont, US
- Died: March 25, 1858 (aged 50) Forest Grove, Oregon, US
- Spouse: Emeline Cadwell

Harvey L. Clarke (October 2, 1807 – March 25, 1858) was an educator, missionary, and settler first on the North Tualatin Plains which would become Glencoe, Oregon, and then on the West Tualatin Plains that would become Forest Grove, Oregon. A native of Vermont where he and his family were stonemasons, he moved to the Oregon Country in 1840 where he participated at the Champoeg Meetings, May 2, 1843, and helped to found Tualatin Academy that later became Pacific University. Clarke also worked for the Methodist Mission and was a chaplain for the Provisional Legislature of Oregon in 1845.

== Early life ==
Harvey L. Clarke was born in Chester, Vermont, on October 2, 1807. In Vermont he married Emeline Cadwell, and they would have five children. In 1840, Clarke, with his wife, moved to Oregon Country as a Congregational Minister and as missionaries to the Native Americans.

== Oregon ==
Harvey Clarke and his Party traveled overland with the Trapper Caravan from the States, leaving Westport on the Missouri River to travel across the plains, attend the 1840 Trapper Rendezvous in Green River, and on to Fort Hall where Joe Meek and his family were waiting. They arrived August 14, 1840, at the Whitman Station. He was an independent missionary, unaffiliated with any missionary organization such as the American Board of Commissioners for Foreign Missions. The Clarke Party included Harvey Clarke and his wife Emeline, Alvin T. and Abigail Smith, Philo and Adelaide Littlejohn. In Oregon, Clarke taught at the Methodist Mission’s first location at Mission Bottom on the French Prairie in the Willamette Valley. By 1842, Harvey and Emeline Clarke had moved to the North Tualatin Plains, built a small log home in Glencoe. They were teaching the Métis children from Red River, and a few Atfalati children in their cabin. Harvey and Emeline Clarke were the first teachers in what would become the district of Tuality and later Washington County, Oregon. They moved to West Tuality on the Tualatin Plains, and taught there. This location would later become the town of Forest Grove, and Clarke would take a land claim at the location. In 1843, he was one of several participants from the Tualatin Valley that participated in the Champoeg Meetings. At the May 2, 1843, meeting, Clarke voted for the creation of the Provisional Government of Oregon, which passed by a 52 to 50 margin.

In 1844, Clarke established a Congregational Church [a simple log church] in Forest Grove and another in Oregon City. The following year he served as one of several chaplains to the Provisional Legislature of Oregon. Clarke made his land claim in 1846 for about 480 acres (1.9 km^{2}).

=== Pacific University ===
In 1842, Clarke and his wife started a school for Native Americans at Glencoe in what is now Hillsboro to the east of Forest Grove. A few years later Tabitha Moffatt Brown arrived in Forest Grove and joined the Clarkes in operating a home for orphans. In 1848, George H. Atkinson arrived and began working with Clarke to create a college in Oregon, which was chartered by the Oregon Territorial Legislature in 1849 as Tualatin Academy. Clarke donated 20 acres (81,000 m^{2}) to the school that year, and deeded another 200 acres (0.81 km^{2}). Tualatin Academy would grow with the addition of a college, Pacific University in 1854, while the academy would be closed in 1915. Marsh Hall at the school is situated where the three original land claims of the town’s founders met, including Clarke’s.

== Later years ==
In 1849, he taught for a short time at the Clackamas County Female Seminary. Clarke would also sell 150 acres (0.61 km^{2}) of his land claim and donate the proceeds to the school he helped to found. The Reverend Harvey L. Clarke died on March 25, 1858, at the age of 50 in Forest Grove.
