= Forest Grove, Oregon =

- City
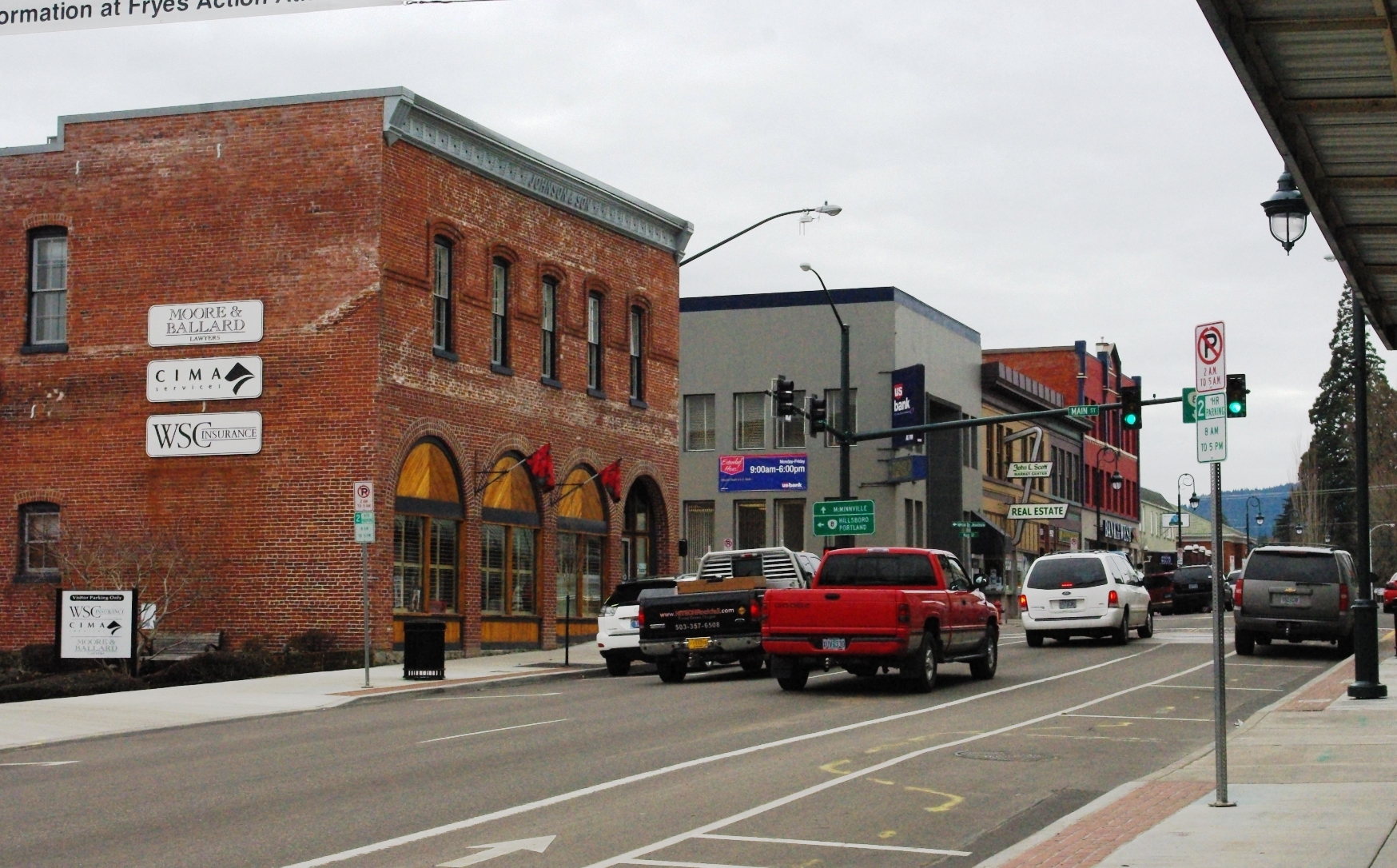
- Pacific Avenue in downtown Forest Grove

- Seal
- Motto(s): "A place where families and businesses thrive."
- Location in Oregon

- Location in the United States
- Coordinates: 45°31′29″N 123°06′44″W
- Country: United States
- State: Oregon
- County: Washington
- Incorporated: 1872

Government
  - Mayor: Malynda Wenzl

Area
  - Total: 6.03 sq mi (15.61 km^{2})
  - Land: 5.89 sq mi (15.26 km^{2})
  - Water: 0.14 sq mi (0.35 km^{2})
- Elevation: 190 ft (58 m)

Population (2020)
  - Total: 26,225
  - Density: 4,451.6/sq mi (1,718.78/km^{2})
- Time zone: UTC−8 (Pacific)
  - Summer (DST): UTC−7 (Pacific)
- ZIP code: 97116
- Area codes: 503 and 971
- FIPS code: 41-26200
- GNIS feature ID: 2410518
- Website: www.forestgrove-or.gov

Forest Grove is a city in Washington County, Oregon, United States, 25 miles (40 km) west of Portland, within the Tualatin Valley. Originally a small farm town, it is now primarily a commuter town in the Portland metro area. Settled in the 1840s, the town was platted in 1850, then incorporated in 1872, making it the first city in Washington County.

The population was 26,225 at the 2020 census, an increase of 8% over 2010 figure (21,083).

Pacific University is located here. Old College Hall on campus, and nine other sites in the city, are listed on the National Register of Historic Places.

== History ==
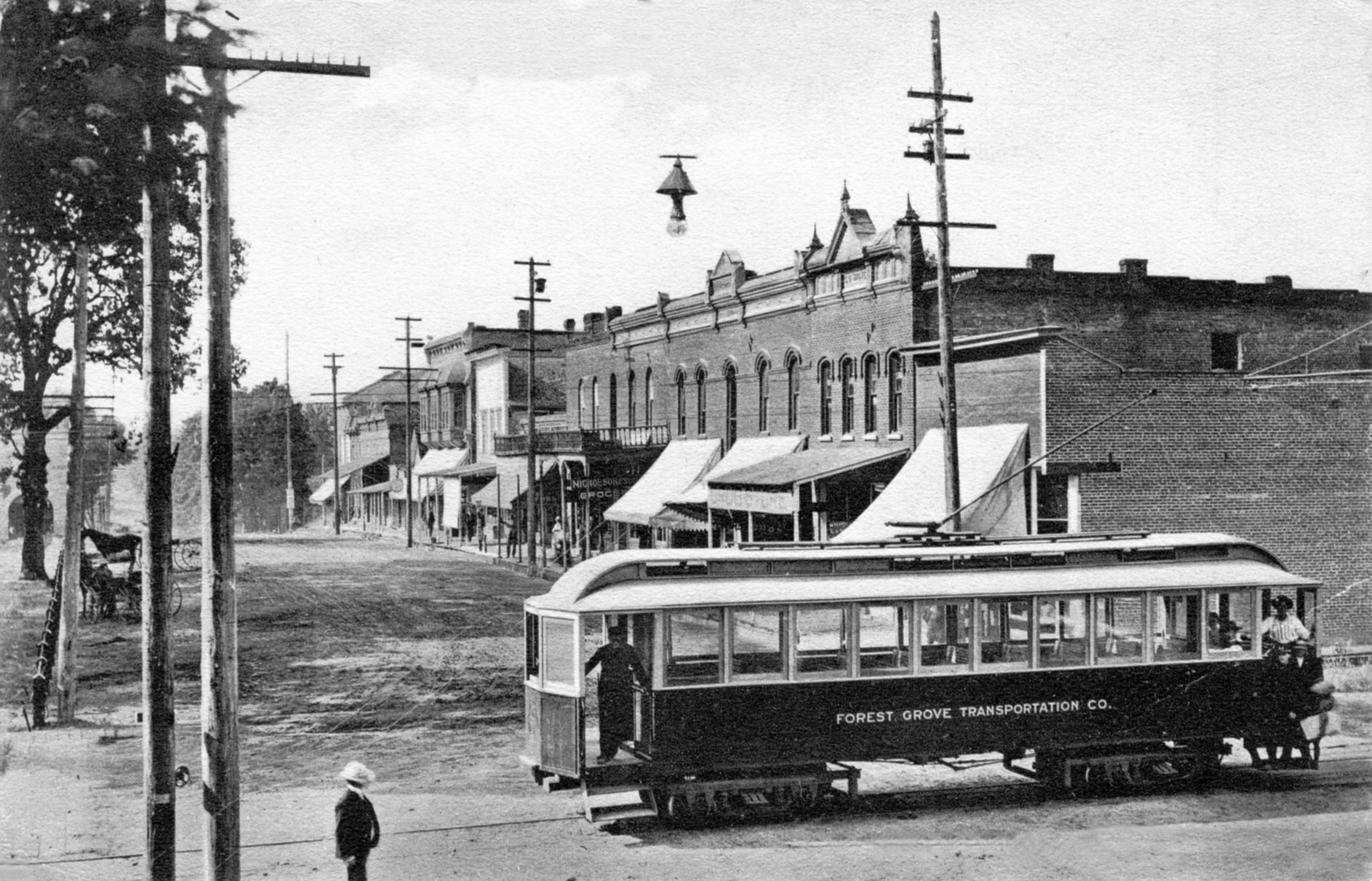
Forest Grove, 1909

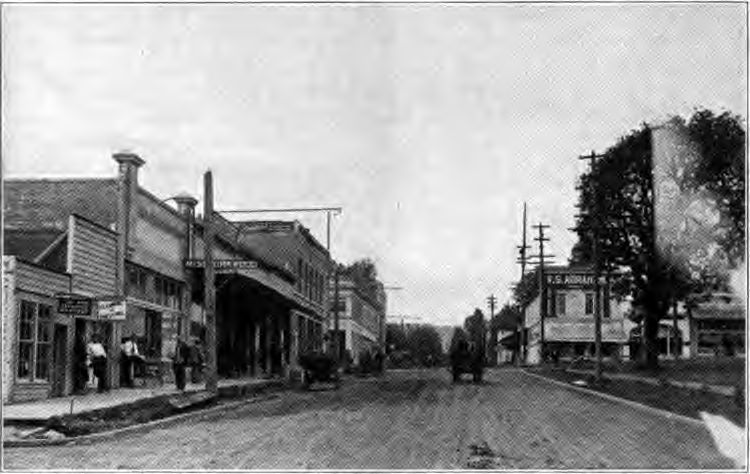
Pacific Avenue, circa 1920

Prior to the 1840s when Euro-Americans settled the area, the Atfalati band of the Kalapuya Native American tribe lived on the Tualatin Plains in what is now Forest Grove. In 1841, Alvin T. and Abigail Smith were among the earliest to use the Oregon Trail and settled on what was first known as West Tualatin Plain. They overwintered with Henry Harmon Spalding, arriving in what is now Forest Grove in the fall. Intending to be missionaries, they found little potential as most of the natives had succumbed to European diseases. Smith served as the community's first postmaster beginning on February 1, 1850, and his log cabin served as the post office.

According to Oregon Geographic Names, the name Forest Grove was selected on January 10, 1851, at a meeting of the trustees of Tualatin Academy. Resident and school trustee J. Quinn Thornton suggested the name, which he also had used for the name of his homestead. The name referred to a grove of oak trees that still stand on what is now the campus of the university. Previous post offices in the area were called Tuality Plains and Tualatin, with Forest Grove adopted on December 31, 1858.

In 1860, the population reached 430, but declined to 396 in 1870. Forest Grove was incorporated by the state in 1872, the first in the county. In 1880, the now Chemawa Indian School opened in the city to forcibly assimilate Native American children, but moved to Salem in 1884. The city started the Fire Department in 1894. The population reached nearly 1,300 in 1900.

In November 1908, the Oregon Electric Railway (OE) began serving the city, and in January 1914, competitor Southern Pacific (SP) followed suit, opening its own line, separate from OE's. Both railroads provided freight and passenger service, SP's passenger service being known as the Red Electric. A company called the Forest Grove Transportation Company operated local streetcar service that linked downtown to Carnation, Oregon, where the Oregon & California Railroad built its depot, but the service lasted only from 1906 to 1911. The Red Electric passenger service to Forest Grove ended in 1929 and Oregon Electric's ceased in 1932.

In February 2016, a high-pitched, hissing noise called the Forest Grove Sound was heard by several residents of the town.

The Oregon Army National Guard's 2nd Battalion-218th Field Artillery Regiment is headquartered in Forest Grove.

== Geography ==
Forest Grove is located on the western edge of the Portland metropolitan area and the Willamette Valley.

According to the United States Census Bureau, the city has a total area of 5.88 square miles (15.23 km^{2}), of which 5.74 square miles (14.87 km^{2}) is land and 0.14 square miles (0.36 km^{2}) is water.

One of the largest Giant Sequoia trees of the state of Oregon can be found in Forest Grove.

=== Climate ===
This region experiences warm (but not hot) and dry summers, with no average monthly temperatures above 71.6 °F (22.0 °C). According to the Köppen Climate Classification system, Forest Grove has a warm-summer Mediterranean climate, abbreviated "Csb" on climate maps.

Climate data for Forest Grove (1991–2020 normals, extremes 1893-present)
Month	Jan	Feb	Mar	Apr	May	Jun	Jul	Aug	Sep	Oct	Nov	Dec	Year
Record high °F (°C)	67 (19)	77 (25)	82 (28)	93 (34)	101 (38)	113 (45)	109 (43)	108 (42)	104 (40)	93 (34)	72 (22)	64 (18)	113 (45)
Mean maximum °F (°C)	57.4 (14.1)	61.1 (16.2)	70.3 (21.3)	79.6 (26.4)	88.9 (31.6)	92.5 (33.6)	98.6 (37.0)	98.7 (37.1)	93.8 (34.3)	80.0 (26.7)	64.3 (17.9)	56.8 (13.8)	101.8 (38.8)
Mean daily maximum °F (°C)	45.0 (7.2)	49.4 (9.7)	54.6 (12.6)	60.1 (15.6)	68.1 (20.1)	73.1 (22.8)	81.4 (27.4)	82.2 (27.9)	76.1 (24.5)	63.3 (17.4)	50.9 (10.5)	44.0 (6.7)	62.4 (16.9)
Daily mean °F (°C)	38.8 (3.8)	41.2 (5.1)	45.2 (7.3)	49.6 (9.8)	56.7 (13.7)	61.4 (16.3)	67.6 (19.8)	67.9 (19.9)	62.4 (16.9)	52.4 (11.3)	43.6 (6.4)	38.4 (3.6)	52.1 (11.2)
Mean daily minimum °F (°C)	32.6 (0.3)	33.1 (0.6)	35.9 (2.2)	39.2 (4.0)	45.3 (7.4)	49.7 (9.8)	53.8 (12.1)	53.5 (11.9)	48.7 (9.3)	41.6 (5.3)	36.3 (2.4)	32.8 (0.4)	41.9 (5.5)
Mean minimum °F (°C)	21.1 (−6.1)	22.8 (−5.1)	27.5 (−2.5)	30.4 (−0.9)	35.6 (2.0)	41.4 (5.2)	45.7 (7.6)	45.6 (7.6)	39.6 (4.2)	31.0 (−0.6)	24.7 (−4.1)	20.7 (−6.3)	15.7 (−9.1)
Record low °F (°C)	−11 (−24)	−12 (−24)	13 (−11)	23 (−5)	28 (−2)	32 (0)	34 (1)	33 (1)	27 (−3)	20 (−7)	6 (−14)	−4 (−20)	−12 (−24)
Average precipitation inches (mm)	7.19 (183)	5.76 (146)	5.03 (128)	3.33 (85)	2.19 (56)	1.40 (36)	0.32 (8.1)	0.51 (13)	1.34 (34)	3.70 (94)	7.23 (184)	8.72 (221)	46.72 (1,187)
Average snowfall inches (cm)	0.6 (1.5)	0.6 (1.5)	0.0 (0.0)	0.0 (0.0)	0.0 (0.0)	0.0 (0.0)	0.0 (0.0)	0.0 (0.0)	0.0 (0.0)	0.2 (0.51)	0.0 (0.0)	1.3 (3.3)	2.7 (6.9)
Average precipitation days (≥ 0.01 in)	18.6	15.0	17.2	15.9	11.2	8.1	2.4	2.9	5.4	11.4	18.6	19.4	146.1
Average snowy days (≥ 0.1 in)	0.2	0.1	0.0	0.0	0.0	0.0	0.0	0.0	0.0	0.0	0.0	0.3	0.6
Source: NOAA

== Demographics ==
Historical population
Census	Pop.	Note	%±
1880	547		—
1890	668		22.1%
1900	1,096		64.1%
1910	1,772		61.7%
1920	419		−76.4%
1930	362		−13.6%
1940	2,449		576.5%
1950	4,343		77.3%
1960	5,628		29.6%
1970	8,275		47.0%
1980	11,499		39.0%
1990	13,559		17.9%
2000	17,708		30.6%
2010	21,083		19.1%
2020	26,225		24.4%
U.S. Decennial Census; 2018 Estimate

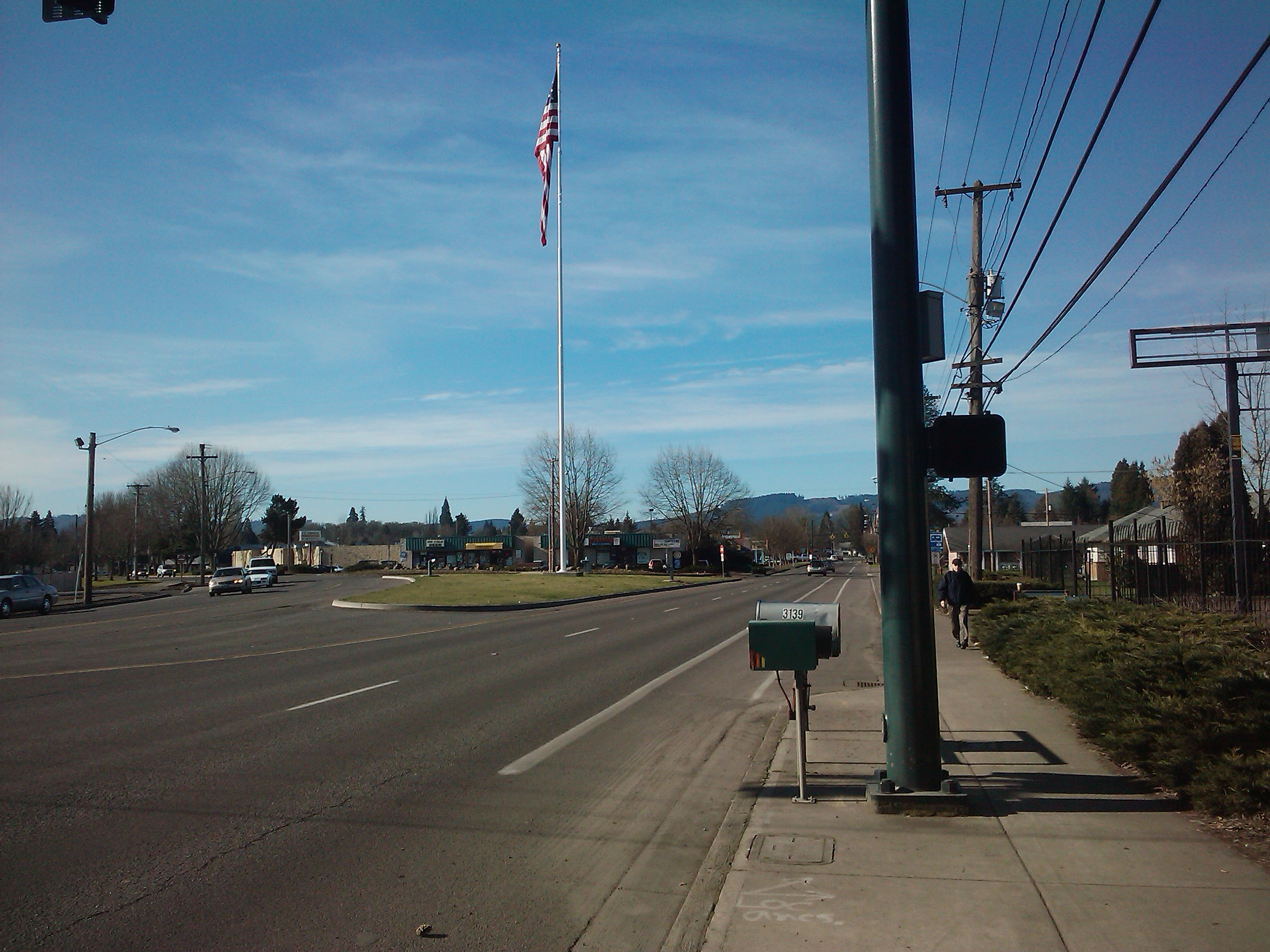
The 120-foot (36-meter) flagpole on Pacific Avenue between Maple and Laurel streets, looking west.

=== 2020 census ===
As of the 2020 census, Forest Grove had a population of 26,225 and 9,103 families residing in the city. The median age was 35.3 years, with 23.5% of residents under the age of 18 and 15.1% aged 65 or older. For every 100 females there were 93.6 males, and for every 100 females age 18 and over there were 90.8 males age 18 and over.

As of the 2020 census, 99.7% of residents lived in urban areas, while 0.3% lived in rural areas.

There were 9,010 households in Forest Grove, of which 34.8% had children under the age of 18 living in them. Of all households, 49.3% were married-couple households, 16.9% were households with a male householder and no spouse or partner present, and 25.8% were households with a female householder and no spouse or partner present. About 24.2% of all households were made up of individuals, and 12.3% had someone living alone who was 65 years of age or older.

There were 9,356 housing units, of which 3.7% were vacant. Among occupied housing units, 59.5% were owner-occupied and 40.5% were renter-occupied. The homeowner vacancy rate was 0.7% and the rental vacancy rate was 4.5%.

As of the 2020 census, 14.3% of residents identified as someone with a disability.

Racial composition as of the 2020 census
Race	Number	Percent
White	17,885	68.2%
Black or African American	266	1.0%
American Indian and Alaska Native	338	1.3%
Asian	709	2.7%
Native Hawaiian and Other Pacific Islander	82	0.3%
Some other race	3,559	13.6%
Two or more races	3,386	12.9%
Hispanic or Latino (of any race)	7,153	27.3%

=== 2010 census ===
As of the census of 2010, there were 21,083 people, 7,385 households, and 4,871 families residing in the city. The population density was 3,673.0 inhabitants per square mile (1,418.2/km^{2}). There were 7,845 housing units at an average density of 1,366.7 per square mile (527.7/km^{2}). The racial makeup of the city was 78.8% White, 0.8% African American, 1.1% Native American, 2.6% Asian, 0.3% Pacific Islander, 12.5% from other races, and 3.9% from two or more races. Hispanic or Latino of any race were 23.1% of the population.

There were 7,385 households, of which 37.4% had children under the age of 18 living with them, 50.1% were married couples living together, 11.0% had a female householder with no husband present, 4.9% had a male householder with no wife present, and 34.0% were non-families. 27.0% of all households were made up of individuals, and 12.7% had someone living alone who was 65 years of age or older. The average household size was 2.71 and the average family size was 3.31.

The median age in the city was 32.7 years. 26.6% of residents were under the age of 18; 13.3% were between the ages of 18 and 24; 25.6% were from 25 to 44; 22.2% were from 45 to 64; and 12.3% were 65 years of age or older. The gender makeup of the city was 48.0% male and 52.0% female.

=== 2000 census ===
As of the census of 2000, there were 17,708 people, 6,336 households, and 4,131 families residing in the city. The population density was 3,850.5 inhabitants per square mile (1,486.7/km^{2}). There were 6,702 housing units at an average density of 1,457.3 per square mile (562.7/km^{2}). The racial makeup of the city was 81.46% White, 0.43% African American, 0.89% Native American, 2.11% Asian, 0.24% Pacific Islander, 11.39% from other races, and 3.47% from two or more races. Hispanic or Latino of any race were 17.31% of the population.

There are 6,336 households, out of which 35.9% had children under the age of 18 living with them, 50.3% were married couples living together, 10.2% had a female householder with no husband present, and 34.8% were non-families. 27.9% of all households were made up of individuals, and 14.3% had someone living alone who was 65 years of age or older. The average household size was 2.64 and the average family size was 3.24.

In the city the population was spread out, with 27.4% under the age of 18, 13.4% from 18 to 24, 28.7% from 25 to 44, 16.8% from 45 to 64, and 13.6% who were 65 years of age or older. The median age was 31 years. For every 100 females, there were 90.2 males. For every 100 females age 18 and over, there were 86.6 males.

The median income for a household in the city was $40,135, and the median income for a family was $47,733. Males had a median income of $36,139 versus $25,703 for females. The per capita income for the city was $16,992. About 10.4% of families and 14.3% of the population were below the poverty line, including 16.2% of those under age 18 and 11.4% of those age 65 or over.

== Arts and culture ==
There are 12 properties individually listed on the National Register of Historic Places and two historic districts: the 18-block Clark Historic District with homes dating as far back as 1854 (and several dozen pre-1900) and the Painter's Woods Historic District. These include the Alvin T. Smith House, First Church of Christ, Scientist, and Old College Hall.

Annual events include a sidewalk chalk art festival, and a holiday light parade.

Valley Arts Association, established in 1966, is one of the oldest nonprofit, volunteer associations in the Pacific Northwest. Its gallery sells member art, and offers art classes.

The Star Theatre, built in 1912, featured films and live productions. A community theater company performs there.

== Education ==
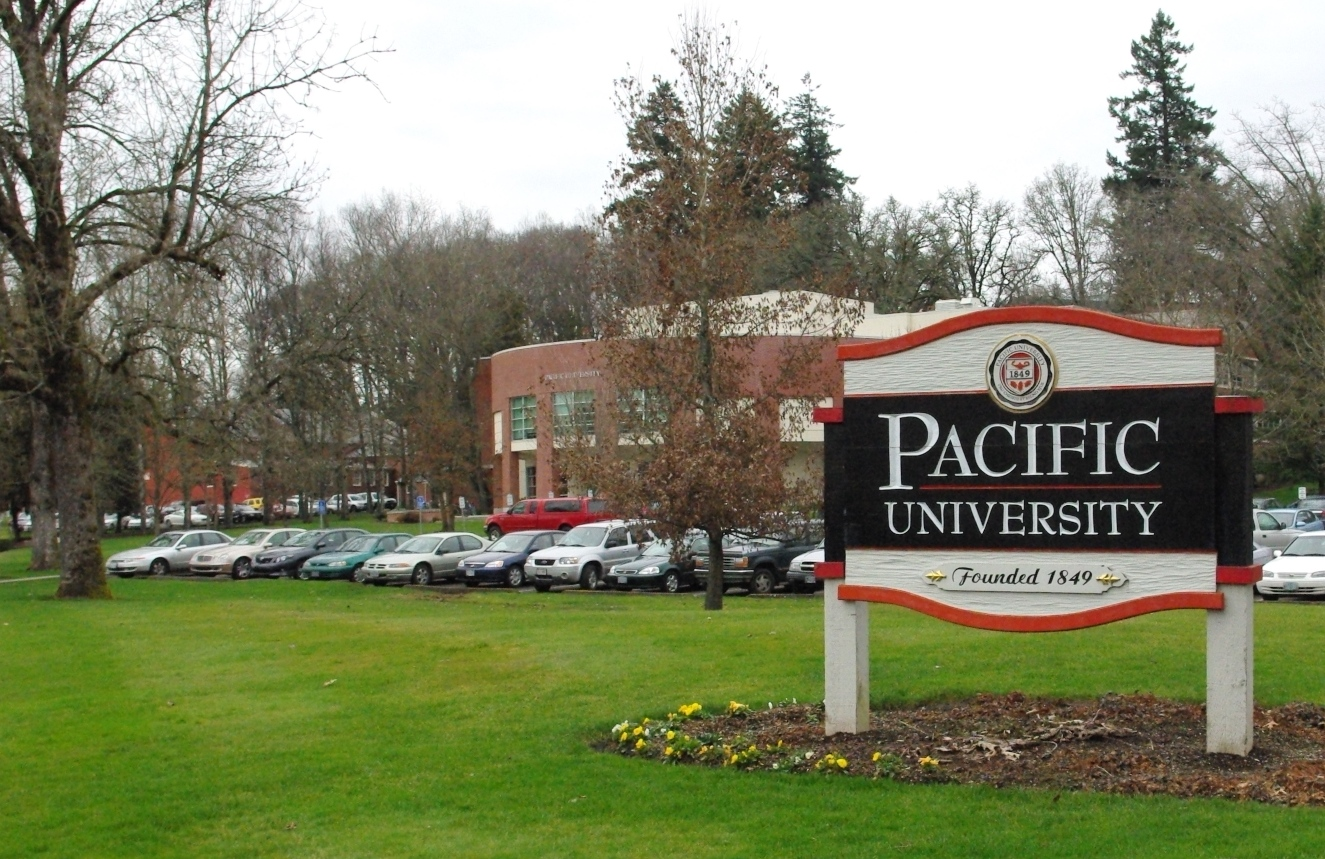
Pacific University

Pacific University is a private university in Forest Grove. Notable buildings include Old College Hall and Marsh Hall.

Forest Grove, as well as Gales Creek, Dilley, and portions of Cornelius, are all part of the Forest Grove School District.

== Media ==
=== Newspapers ===
- Forest Grove Leader
- News-Times

=== Film location ===
In the 1990s, filming for the television show, Nowhere Man, took place in Forest Grove numerous times. In 2015, an episode of The Librarians was filmed at Pacific University and two other sites in Forest Grove. The city's Forest Theater hosted a free public screening of the episode at the same time it aired on TV . The 2019 series Pretty Little Liars: The Perfectionists was filmed in Forest Grove, mostly at Pacific University.

== Infrastructure ==
=== Highways ===
Highways include Oregon Route 8 (Tualatin Valley Highway) and Oregon Route 47.

=== Public transportation ===
Bus service is provided by TriMet and Yamhill County Transit Area. Ride Connection provides free, non-profit bus service called "GroveLink" in suburban areas.

=== Healthcare ===
Tuality Forest Grove Hospital is located in Forest Grove.

== Notable people ==
- Tabitha Moffatt Brown
- Joseph Conrad Chamberlin
- Bobby Chouinard
- Mike Clock
- Harvey L. Clark
- Aubrey Gordon
- Haley Heynderickx
- Jesse Jenkins
- Genevieve Springston Lynch
- Nellie Owens
- Zac Rosscup
- Alvin T. Smith
- Richard VanGrunsven

== Sister cities ==
Forest Grove's sister city is Nyūzen, Japan.

== See also ==
- Merix Corporation
- The Grand Lodge Hotel
