= Tabitha Moffatt Brown =

American pioneer

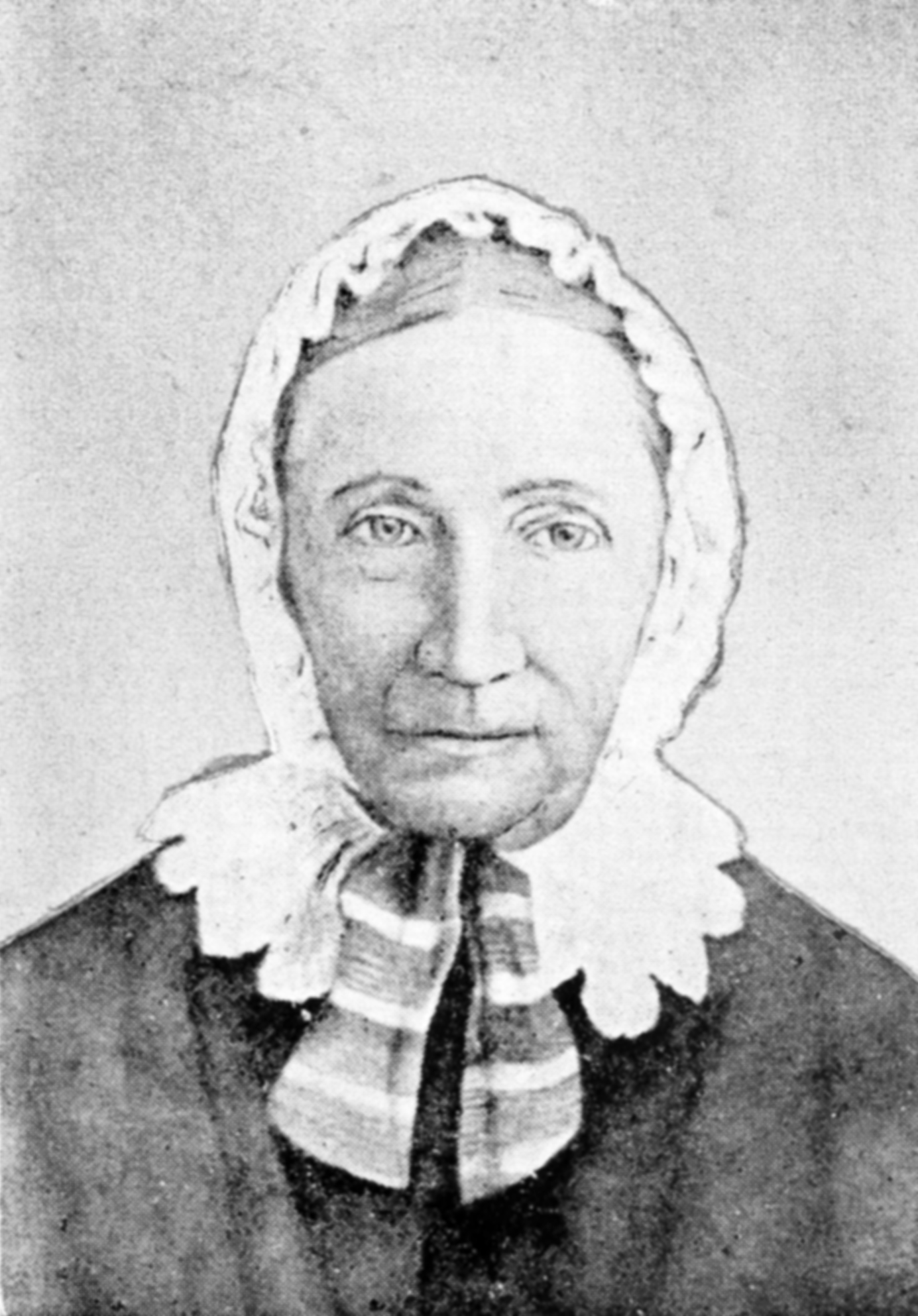
- Born: May 1, 1780; Brimfield, Massachusetts, U.S.
- Died: May 4, 1858 (aged 78); Salem, Oregon, U.S.
- Occupation: educator
- Spouse: Reverend Clark Brown

Tabitha Moffatt Brown (May 1, 1780 – May 4, 1858) was an American pioneer colonist who traveled the Oregon Trail to the Oregon Country. There she assisted in the founding of Tualatin Academy, which would grow to become Pacific University in Forest Grove, Oregon. Brown was honored in 1987 by the Oregon Legislature as the "Mother of Oregon."

== Early life ==
Born on May 1, 1780, in Brimfield, Massachusetts, Brown was the daughter of Lois Haynes Moffatt and Dr. Joseph Moffatt. She married the Reverend Clark Brown (1771–1817) on December 1, 1799. The pair raised three boys and one girl together until the reverend died in 1817. He was a Congregational minister, and later became an Episcopalian minister. The oldest son was Orus, followed by Manthano, John Mattacks, and finally a daughter, Pherne. John died at age six. Prior to John and Clark's deaths, the family lived in various locales, including Charles County, Maryland, where Clark is buried. Later the family moved to Missouri to follow Brown's brother-in-law Captain John Brown, a sea captain. She supported the family by teaching.

== Oregon journey ==
Orus Brown went to the Oregon Country in 1843 and returned two years later to retrieve his family, his sister's family, and his now elderly mother and uncle. Manthano remained behind in Kansas. The trip began in April 1846 and the families remained united until they reached Fort Hall in what is now Idaho. While there they decided to use the Applegate Trail as they were informed it was a shortcut. Orus continued alone on the traditional route of the Oregon Trail. A winter storm flooded parts of new path with rain, which delayed their arrival at the Willamette Valley. As winter set in, the family had still not reached the valley and they sent Pherne's husband Virgil Pringle to seek help from the settlers of the valley. On his way to Oregon City, Pringle ran into Orus, who was on his way to help with supplies. The two then returned and brought the rest of the family to the settlements on December 25, 1846.

== Later life ==
Once in the Oregon Country, Tabitha Brown traveled between Oregon City and her daughter's home in Salem, and eventually settled in Forest Grove. She arrived fairly poor in the Willamette Valley, having only a single Spanish picayune coin, which she used to purchase sewing supplies. Some of her spare clothing was bartered with several Kalapuya to acquire buckskin. Brown began manufacturing gloves, which were purchased by fellow settlers and loggers, and soon she had earned $30. Later she helped found an orphanage with Harvey L. Clark. During the first year Brown had 30 wards to watch over, several being as old as 21, while their parents went south during the California Gold Rush. Then with Clark and the Rev. George H. Atkinson, they founded Tualatin Academy, which would grow to become Pacific University in Forest Grove. Brown died in Salem while living with her daughter on May 4, 1858. She is buried in Salem at the Pioneer Cemetery.

== Legacy ==
There was a tree dedicated in her memory at Champoeg State Park, although at some point it was cut down. A World War II Liberty Ship built in 1942 was named in her honor. Brown's great-granddaughter, Mary Strong Kinney, was an Oregon State Senator.
