= Tualatin Academy =

- Type: Secondary school
- Established: 1848
- Location: Forest Grove, Oregon, USA
- Fate: Closed in 1914; Pacific University continued

Tualatin Academy was a secondary school in the U.S. state of Oregon that eventually became Pacific University. Tualatin Academy also refers to the National Register of Historic Places-listed college building constructed in 1850 to house the academy, also known as Old College Hall. The building now serves as the Pacific University Museum, and is one of the oldest collegiate buildings in the western United States.

== Academy ==
Congregational minister Harvey L. Clark started a missionary school in 1841 just north of East Tualatin Plains, now Hillsboro. The school was soon moved to West Tualatin Plains (now Forest Grove) where in 1847 Clark was joined by Tabitha Moffatt Brown, the Mother of Oregon. The two then operated a school for settler's children and Brown opened a school for orphans, opening in 1848. The Reverend Henry H. Spalding’s wife Eliza Hart Spalding was hired to teach at the school the first year. In 1848, Presbyterians and Congregationalists determined to start a school with Clark and Brown's school as the location. The Oregon Territorial Legislature chartered the Tualatin Academy on September 29, 1849.

Founding trustees of the school included Clark, P. H. Hatch, George H. Atkinson, James M. Moore, and Osborne Russell among others. In 1854, when college classes were added, Pacific University was split from the academy. Tualatin Academy continued alongside the university until it was closed in 1914, at a time when many private high schools disappeared with the growth of public schools.

== Building ==
- Tualatin Academy
- U.S. National Register of Historic Places
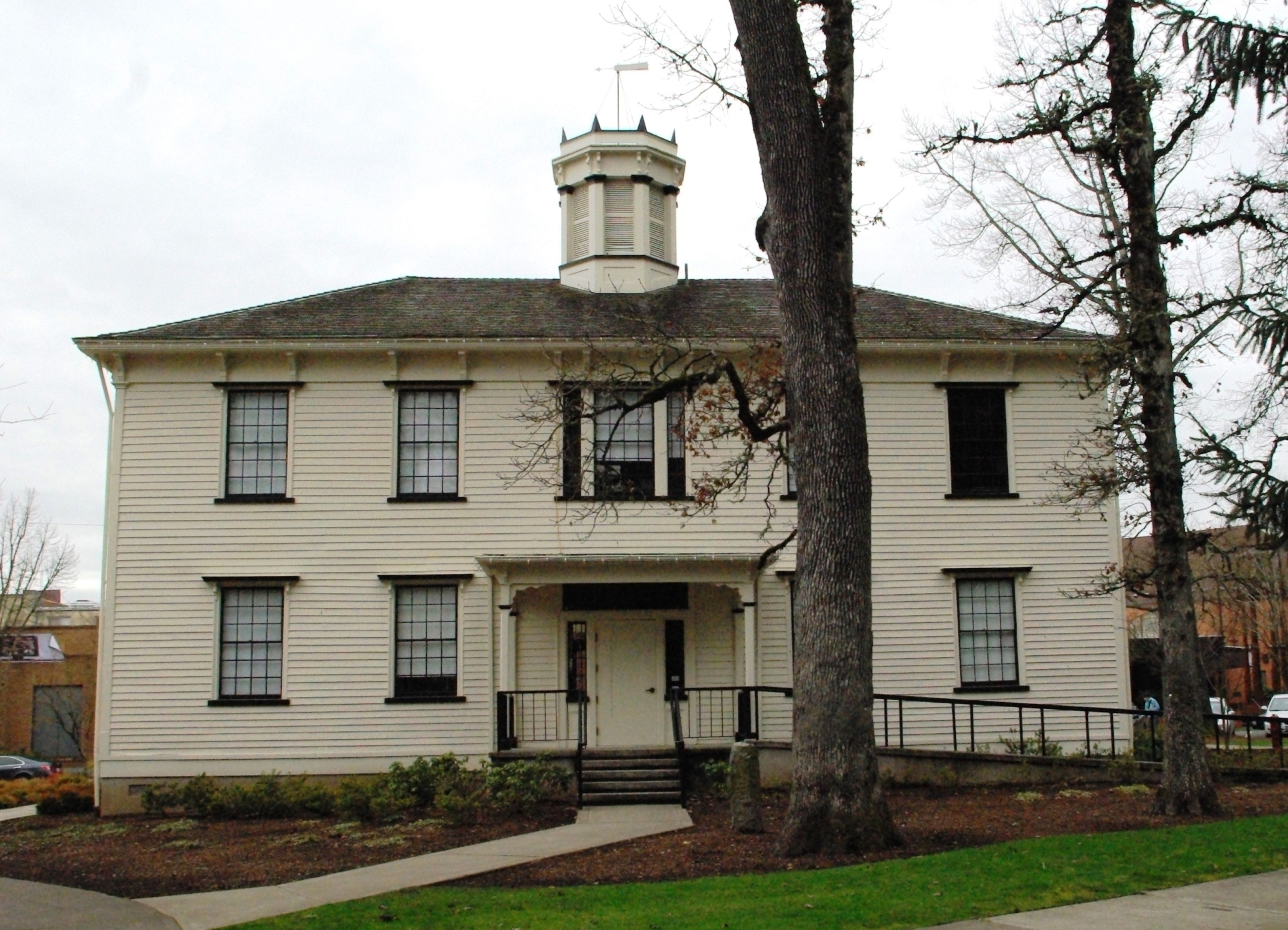
- Building in 2009

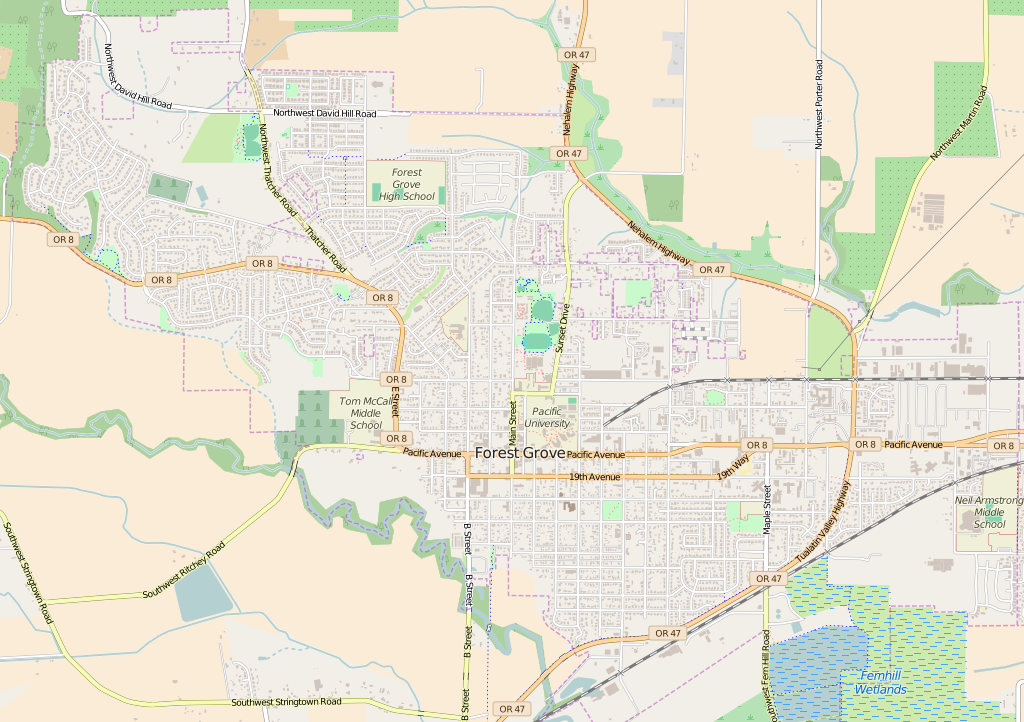
- Location within Forest Grove OR
- Location: Pacific University campus 2043 College Way; Forest Grove, Oregon
- Coordinates: 45°31′13″N 123°06′39″W
- Area: 0.09 acres (360 m^{2})
- Built: 1850 (construction); 1894, 1964, 2003 (relocation)
- Architectural style: Colonial Revival/Georgian Revival
- NRHP reference No.: 74001722
- Added to NRHP: February 12, 1974

The Tualatin Academy building, now known as Old College Hall, is a two-story wood-frame structure. Built by the community in July 1850 in barn raising fashion, it replaced a log cabin previously used by the school. A second identical building was added 18 years after Old College Hall and named Academy Hall. Academy Hall burned in 1910. Old College hall later was the Science Hall for the university and known as the Chem Shack to students from 1900 to 1950. In 1949, the science department moved out and the building was renamed as Old College Hall. That year two rooms upstairs became the Pacific University Museum.

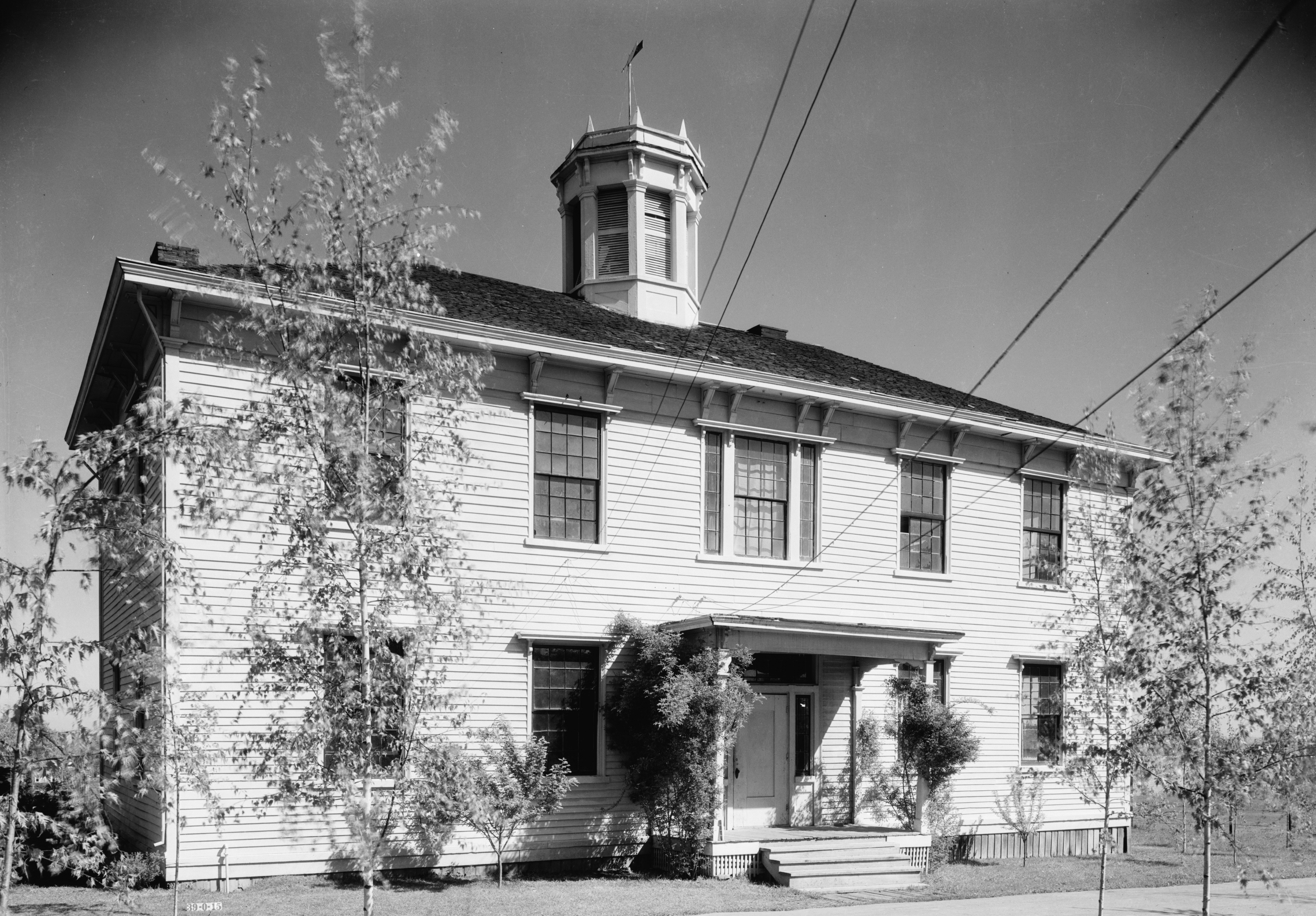
The building in 1934

Sitting atop its hipped roof is an octagonal shaped louvered belfry, similar to one that was on the Oregon Institute building. The rectangular shaped hall is divided by a centralized cross hall. Colonial Revival in style, the structure was added to the National Register of Historic Places as Tualatin Academy in 1974. The downstairs of the building houses the Price Memorial Chapel and meeting space. It is the oldest college building in the state and was still in use as a museum and chapel in 2017.

== Pacific University Museum ==
The second floor of Old College Hall contains the Pacific University Museum with exhibits about the history of the university, including items from school founder Tabitha Moffatt Brown, first school president Sidney Harper Marsh, alumni and friends. Visits are by appointment with the Office of the President. The museum opened in 1949 as part of the school's centennial celebration.
