= Tualatin Plains =

- Region
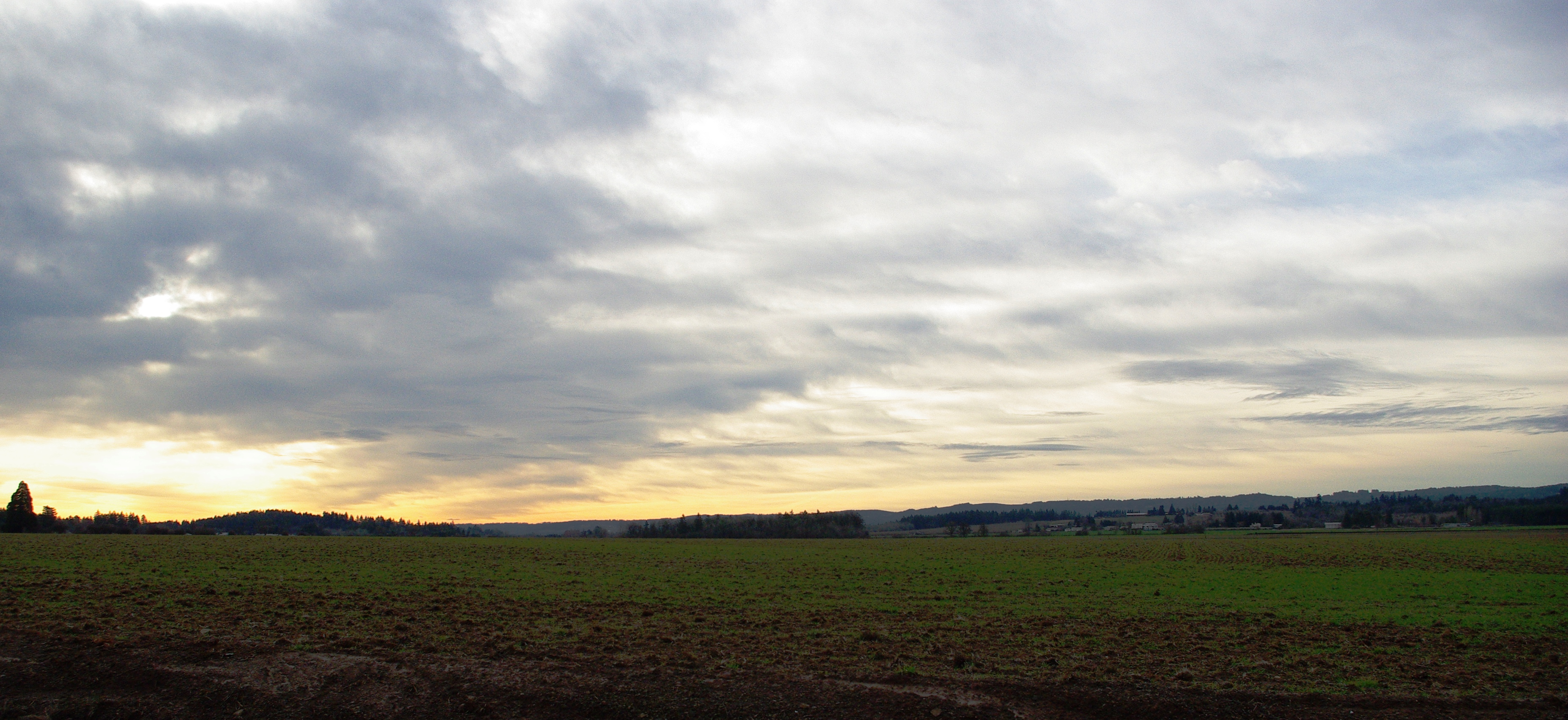
- The plains south of Hillsboro
- Interactive map of Tualatin Plains
- Coordinates: 45°30′38″N 122°59′19″W
- Country: United States
- State: Oregon
- Region: Washington County

The Tualatin Plains are a prairie area in central Washington County, Oregon, United States. Located around the Hillsboro and Forest Grove areas, the plains were first inhabited by the Atfalati band of the Kalapuya group of Native Americans. Euro-American settlement began in the 1840s.

== Geography ==
Located in the Tualatin Valley, the Tualatin Plains are drained by the Tualatin River. They are bounded on the north and east by the foothills of Tualatin Mountains, and to the south by the foothills of the Chehalem Mountains. On the west the foothills of the Northern Oregon Coast Range define their limit.

== History ==
Native Americans were the first inhabitants the area, subsisting as a hunter-gather society. The Atfalati band, like many of the tribes in the Willamette Valley, would burn the flat lands of the valley to promote the growth of grasslands. This annual activity promoted easier hunting and seed gathering among other benefits. It also kept much of the land on the valley floor un-forested. By the 1830s diseases decimated the native populations in the region, including the Tualatin Plains. In the 1830s the Hudson's Bay Company used some of these fire‐cleared areas to raise crops for use at Fort Vancouver and in trade.

In 1840, former mountain men of the fur trade settled on the north section of the plains. These included George W. Ebbert, Joseph Meek, and Caleb Wilkins among others. Congregational minister Harvey L. Clark started a missionary school in 1841 just north of East Tualatin Plains, now Hillsboro. The school was soon moved to West Tualatin Plains (now Forest Grove) where in 1847 Clark was joined by Tabitha Moffatt Brown, the Mother of Oregon. In 1842, David Hill settled on the east plains, naming the settlement Columbus, which would eventually become Hillsboro.

In 1844, some of these early pioneers established a church at West Union, the first Baptist church west of the Rocky Mountains. When the Provisional Government of Oregon formed in 1843, the Plains were part of the Twality District that was composed of the northwest section of the region, including what would become Portland. After Clatsop County was drawn from it, the remainder became Twality County in 1845, and Washington County in 1849. At that time Portland was still part of the county, and agricultural goods from the Plains were transported there to be sold. This led to the building of a plank road between the Plains and Portland, known as Canyon Road, which helped to secure Portland as the main port for Oregon.

Later years saw increased settlement and eventual urbanization over much of the landscape. Communities such as North Plains, Beaverton, Reedville, and Cornelius would join Forest Grove and Hillsboro on the Tualatin Plains. In the 1950s growth of an electronics industry focused on Tektronix would create the foundation for what is known as the Silicon Forest.

== See also ==
- Tualatin Plains Presbyterian Church
- John Smith Griffin
