= Pacific University =

Private university, in Forest Grove, Oregon, U.S.

- Other name: Pacific University Oregon
- Former names: Tualatin Academy (1849–1854); North Pacific College of Optometry (1921–1945)
- Motto: Pro Christo et Regno Ejus
- Motto in English: For Christ and His Kingdom
- Type: Private university
- Established: 1849; 177 years ago
- Founders: Tabitha Moffatt Brown & Harvey Clark
- Religious affiliation: None
- Academic affiliations: Space-grant
- Endowment: $71.4 million (2020)
- President: Jenny Coyle
- Provost: Barbara May
- Academic staff: 298 full-time and 208 part-time
- Students: 3,479
- Undergraduates: 1,613
- Postgraduates: 1,866
- Location: Forest Grove, Oregon, U.S. 45°31′16″N 123°6′29″W
- Campus: Suburban
- Colors: Boxer red & Boxer black
- Nickname: Boxers
- Sporting affiliations: NCAA Division III – Northwest Conference
- Mascot: Boxer
- Website: pacificu.edu

Pacific University is a private university in Forest Grove, Oregon, United States. Founded in 1849 as the Tualatin Academy, the original Forest Grove campus is 23 miles (37 km) west of Portland. The school maintains one other campus, in Hillsboro, and an office in Portland, and has an enrollment of more than 3,000 students. The university has Oregon's only optometry school, and offers doctorates in 14 programs. Pacific competes in NCAA Division III as part of the Northwest Conference, with its teams known as the Boxers.

== History ==
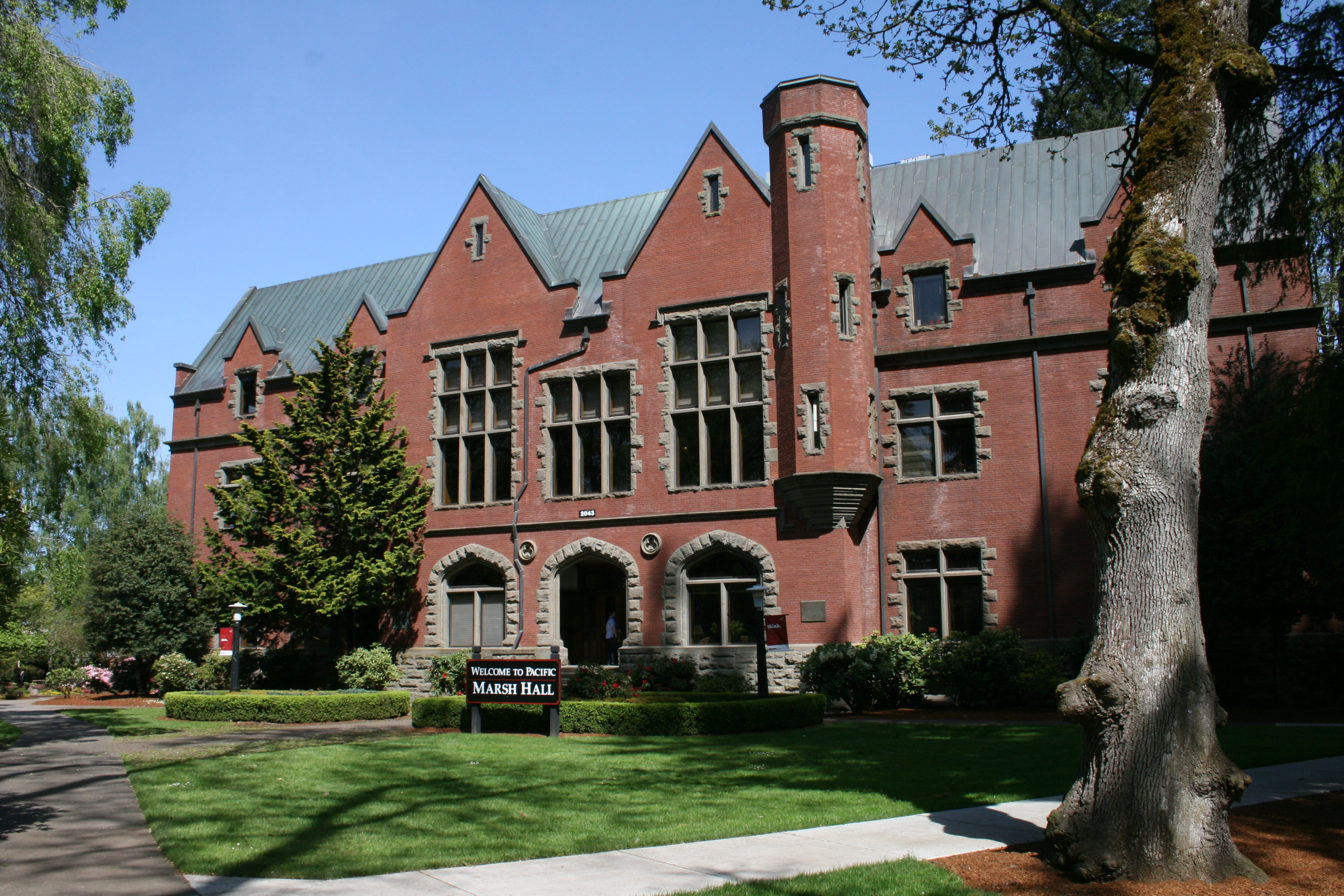
Marsh Hall

Tabitha Moffatt Brown immigrated to the Oregon Country over the new Applegate Trail in 1846. She and Harvey L. Clark started a school and orphanage in Forest Grove in 1847 to care for the orphans of Applegate Trail party. In March 1848, Tualatin Academy was established from the orphanage, with Clark donating 200 acres (80.9 ha) to the school. George H. Atkinson had advocated the founding of the school and with support of the Presbyterians and Congregationalists helped start the academy. Although the university has long been independent of its founding affiliation with the United Church of Christ (UCC), it still maintains a close working relationship with the church as a member of the United Church of Christ Council for Higher Education.

Tualatin Academy was officially chartered by the territorial legislature on September 29, 1849. Clark was the first president of the board of trustees and later donated an additional 150 acres (60.7 ha) to the institution. In 1851, what is now Old College Hall was built and in 1853 Sidney H. Marsh became the school's first president. The current campus was deeded in 1851. In 1854, when the first college classes were added, Pacific University was established. Tualatin Academy continued to operate until 1914 as a private high school separate from but affiliated with the university.

The first university commencement occurred in 1863, with Harvey W. Scott as the only graduate. In 1872, three Japanese students, Hatstara Tamura, Kin Saito, and Yei Nosea, started at the university as part of Japan's modernization movement. All three graduated in 1876. Marsh died in 1879 and was replaced by John R. Herrick.

Marsh Hall was built in 1895, serving as the central building on Pacific's campus. Carnegie Library (now Carnegie Hall) opened in 1912 after Andrew Carnegie's foundation helped finance the brick structure. Portland architecture firm Whidden and Lewis designed the library. In 1915, the preparatory department, Tualatin Academy, closed due to the proliferation of public high schools in Oregon. By 1920, the school had grown to five buildings on 30 acres (12.1 ha) and had an endowment of about $250,000.

Marsh Hall was gutted by fire in 1975, but its shell was preserved, and the structure reopened in 1977. Phillip D. Creighton became Pacific's 16th president in 2003 and retired in 2009. Tommy Thayer, lead guitarist of the band Kiss, was elected to the university's board of trustees in 2005. Pacific's 17th president, Lesley M. Hallick, was named on May 19, 2009. She retired in 2022.

On February 9, 2022, Jenny Coyle was named the 18th president of Pacific University. She is the first alumnus to serve as president, having earned her bachelor's degree, master's degree and Doctor of Optometry from the university. Coyle previously served as a faculty member and dean of Pacific's College of Optometry.

=== Mascot ===
In 1896, alumnus J.E. Walker, who had been a missionary to China, and his mother gave the university a bronze Chinese statue. Qilin (pronounced chee-lin or ki-rin) is a mythical Chinese creature with a leonine stance, a unicorn-like horn, and deer or ox hooves from the Qing dynasty. During this period, qilin were often represented with a dragon head, fish scales, ox hooves and a lion's tail. Said to be a good omen of wisdom and prosperity, the Pacific qilin was nicknamed Boxer by its Chinese and Japanese students as an embodiment of the community's cultural diversity.

In the first half of the 20th century, the original mascot was the center of informal "Boxer Toss" events, where different clubs and groups scrimmaged for the statue as a tradition of passing its care from one group to another. In 1968, Boxer became the university's official mascot, replacing Benny Badger.

In 1969, the statue went missing and remained so for the next 55 years. Various pieces of Boxer were returned to the university over the years, including the statue's tail in 2012. In 2024, the original statue was returned to the university, largely intact.

Two recasts of Boxer were created in the original statue's absence. In the 1980s, the statue was recast as Boxer II; after supposedly enjoying an epic road trip across America, it too disappeared in the mid-2000s.

In 2006, the university commissioned a 12-foot sculpture to replace the missing Boxers, which now stands in a central park welcoming students to Vandervelden Court residence hall. In 2018, alumni funded the design and casting of Boxer III by artist Pat Costello, unveiled during Homecoming weekend. Kept in trust as part of the university's art collection, the statue and exhibits on its cultural and community history are on display in the Tran Library.

== Academics ==
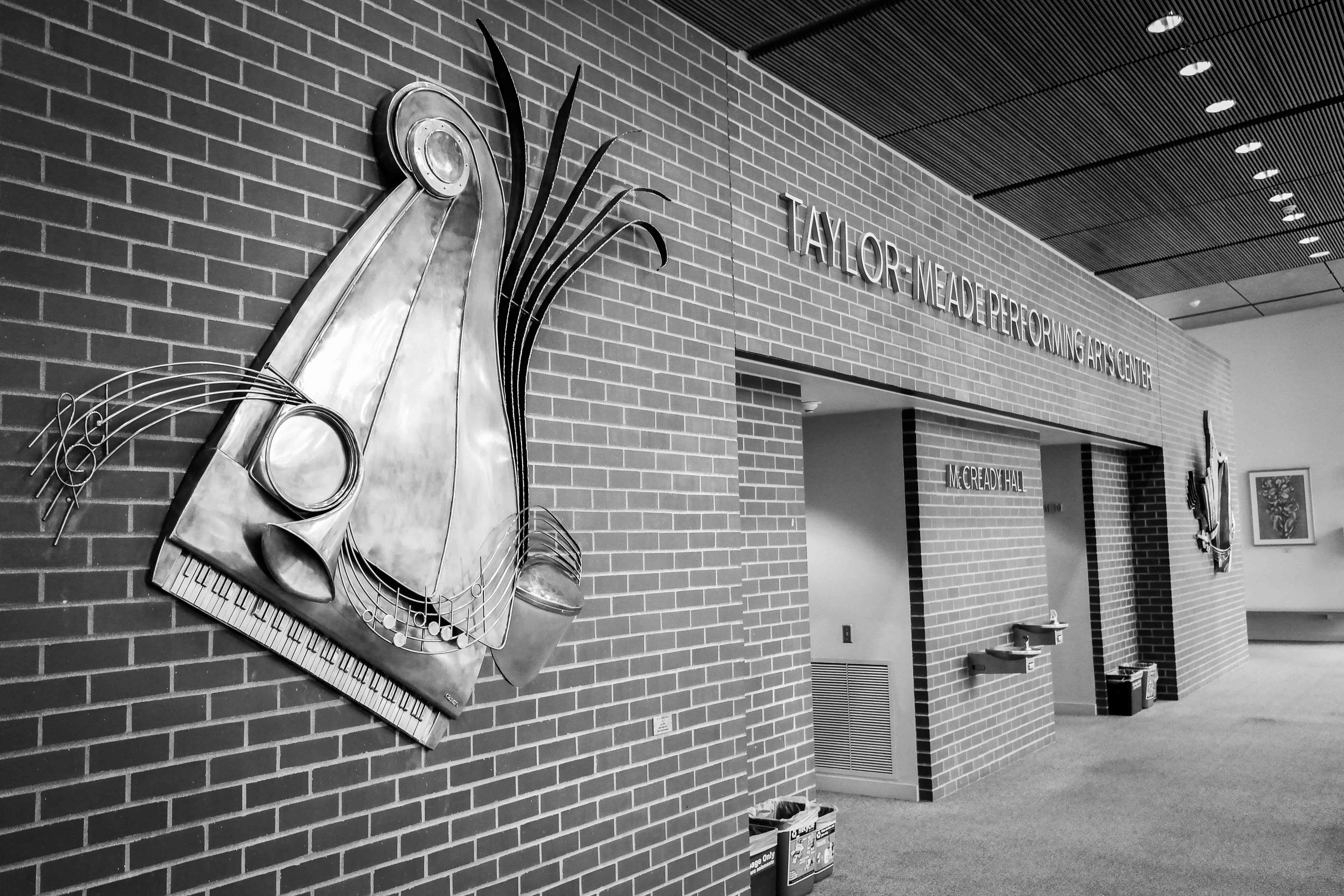
Performing Arts Center

Academic rankings

National
- Forbes: 484
- U.S. News & World Report: 220
- Washington Monthly: 328
- WSJ/College Pulse: 349

Pacific is home to five colleges, offering undergraduate, graduate, and professional programs.

=== College of Arts & Sciences ===
Organized into three schools—Arts & Humanities, Natural Sciences, Social Sciences—the college offers over sixty undergraduate degree options, including unique options in Asia-Pacific studies, communication sciences & disorders, creative writing, editing and publishing, music therapy, outdoor leadership, nonprofit leadership, social work, and a suite of sustainability-centered art and science programs. The low-residency Masters of Fine Arts in Writing program, one of the earliest in the nation having begun in 2004, has been ranked by Poets & Writers magazine as one of the nation's top five low-residency MFA programs every year in which rankings were established. Pacific also opened a Master of Social Work program, based in Eugene, in 2014.

=== College of Business ===
The College of Business (COB) was founded in 2013. It offers undergraduate degrees as well as the Master of Business Administration (MBA) at the Hillsboro campus. The college is accredited by the Accreditation Council for Business Schools and Programs (ACBSP).

=== College of Education ===
In 1994, the School of Education, now the College of Education, was established through reorganization of the professional teacher education programs that had been part of the College of Arts and Sciences. In 2004, the College of Health Professions was formed, now including four undergraduate programs and seven graduate programs.

=== College of Health Professions ===
Founded in 2006 (though several of its programs date back further), the College of Health Professions includes 13 different degree programs as well as a certification in gerontology. Most courses and clinics are on the Hillsboro campus, where the curricula focuses on interprofessional cooperation, and students gain practice in caring for underserved populations.

=== College of Optometry ===
The university's College of Optometry is one of the university's oldest colleges and one of 21 schools in the U.S. and Canada offering a doctorate in optometry. Pacific's program dates back to 1945, when it merged with the North Pacific College of Optometry. Pacific's College of Optometry also offers a master of vision science degree and operates eye clinic and eyeglass dispensaries in communities throughout the Portland area.

== Campuses ==
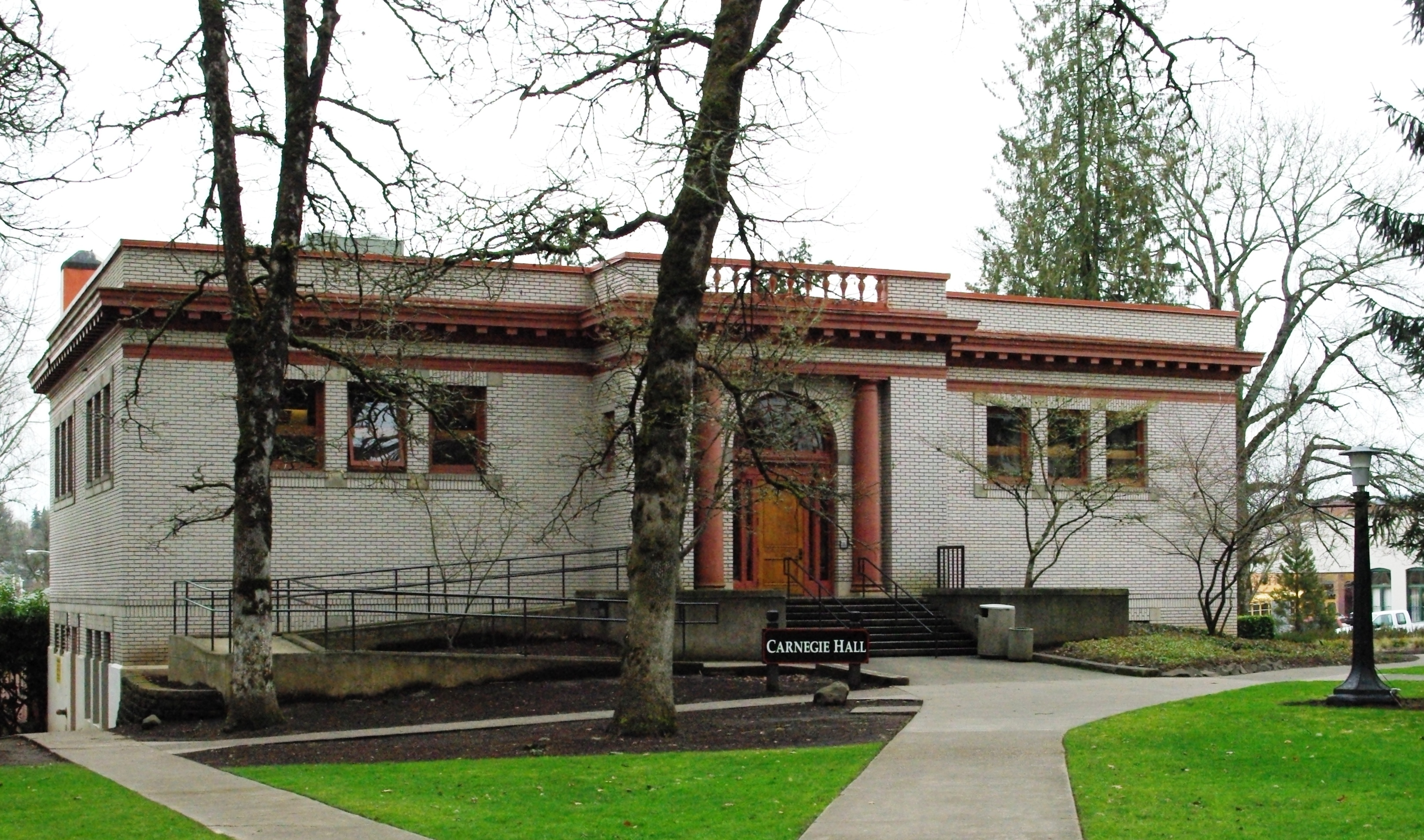
Carnegie Hall

Pacific University has two Oregon campuses, in Forest Grove and Hillsboro. It also maintains satellite locations in Portland and Honolulu, Hawai'i.

=== Forest Grove ===
The Forest Grove campus features several historic buildings. Old College Hall is the oldest educational building west of the Mississippi and today serves as Pacific University's museum. The Forest Grove campus opened a new residence hall, Cascade Hall, in 2014.

The Forest Grove campus is home to a number of sustainability initiatives in its infrastructure, earning a Silver Sustainability Tracking, Assessment & Rating System (STARS) rating in 2019. Several buildings have Leadership in Energy and Environmental Design (LEED) certification, including the Tim and Cathy Tran library, built in 2005 and remodeled with more study rooms and makers space in 2019. The LEED-certified Berglund Hall houses a community preschool, Burlingham and Gilbert residence halls are LEED Gold-certified.

The Bill & Cathy Stoller Center is home to the university's intercollegiate athletic teams, athletic offices, and the department of exercise science. It features more than 95,000 square feet of floor space, including team rooms, locker rooms, classrooms, a wood-floor gymnasium, a weight and fitness center and the Fieldhouse, the first indoor practice area in the Northwest Conference and the only one with FieldTurf.

Outside the Stoller Center is the entrance to Hanson Stadium, which includes a FieldTurf soccer, lacrosse and football surface, a nine-lane track and grandstands. The stadium is part of the City of Forest Grove Lincoln Park Athletic Complex, built in 2008. Lincoln Park houses the baseball complex, Chuck Bafaro Stadium at Bond Field, the softball complex, Sherman/Larkins Stadium, and natural grass fields for soccer and track throwing events. Lincoln Park is also home to a fitness trail, playground equipment, a BMX course, a skateboard park and picnic areas.

=== Hillsboro ===
Just 10 miles east of Forest Grove, the Hillsboro Campus houses many of Pacific's graduate and professional programs. In the heart of Portland's largest suburb, the Hillsboro Campus is on the MAX light rail line in Hillsboro's Health and Education District. The campus has state-of-the-art classroom and labs for the College of Health Professions and MBA programs, as well as community healthcare clinics.

The Hillsboro campus opened in 2006 with its first building, a five-story LEED Gold-certified building, which was dedicated as Creighton Hall. A second building, known as HPC2 and also LEED-certified, opened in 2010. The campus is part of the Hillsboro Health & Education District and is adjacent to the MAX light rail line. Primarily home to Pacific University's College of Health Professions, the campus houses several master's- and doctorate-level programs in health professions, as well as clinics, open to the public, for audiology, dental hygiene, physical therapy and professional psychology, as well as an interdisciplinary diabetes clinic and an eye clinic run by the Pacific University College of Optometry. The Virginia Garcia Memorial Health Center also has a clinic and pharmacy on site.

=== Portland office ===
The MFA in Writing program has an office in Portland's Pearl District in the period between residencies—in the winter in Seaside, Oregon, and in the summer in Forest Grove.

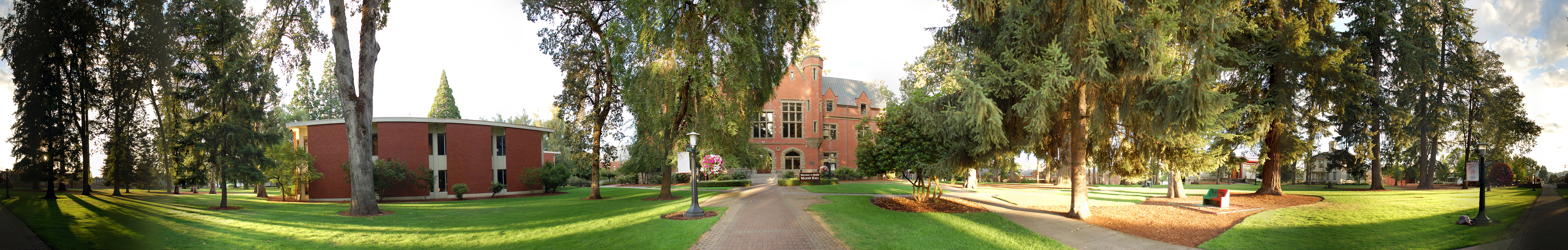
180° panorama of the campus in Forest Grove

Healthcare clinics

Pacific operates comprehensive healthcare clinics and mobile units throughout the greater Portland area in audiology, dental hygiene, optometry, interprofessional, and psychology.

=== Film location ===
Pacific is regularly used as a shooting location for television serials and films. Its campuses are in the Willamette Valley, with its snow-capped mountains, pristine beaches, evergreen forests, and vibrant cities. One producer called Forest Grove "a picture-perfect little town".

== Student life ==
=== Media ===
==== Radio ====
- Boxer Radio: The Sound of Pacific

==== Publications ====
In addition to Pacific University Press and its two imprints founded in 2015, Tualatin Books and 1849 Editions, campus-based print publications include:

- Heart of Oak, an annual yearbook (1894–)
- IJURCA: International Journal of Undergraduate Research & Creative Activities, a peer-reviewed, open-access research journal (2010–)
- The Pacific Index, the student newspaper (1893–)
- PLUM: Pacific's Literature by Undergraduate's Magazine and writing prizes (2007–)
- PU Stinker, a humor magazine (1948–1954)
- Silk Road Review: A Literary Crossroads, an internationally distributed literary magazine (2006–)

=== Greek life ===
Greek Life at Pacific is centered on philanthropy, community engagement, and peer support. Chapters are dedicated to doing good both on and off campus through service and leadership.

Sororities

There are several sororities at Pacific University. They are "local", meaning that they are unique to the campus.

Fraternities

Phi Delta Theta fraternity was established in spring 2025. Delta Tau Delta fraternity was established in fall 2025.

=== Athletics ===
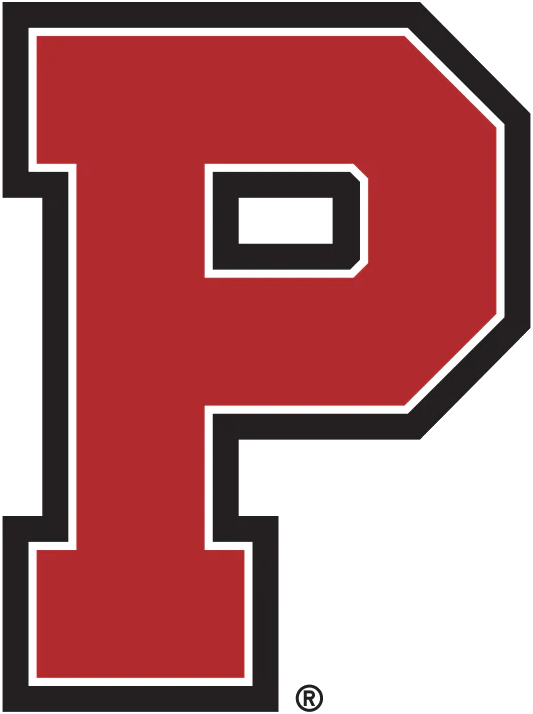
Pacific athletics logo

The Pacific Boxers are members of the Northwest Conference at the NCAA Division III level, having been one of the founding members of the conference in 1926. Pacific began playing football in 1894 as part of the Oregon Intercollegiate Football Association.

Today, men compete in baseball, basketball, cross country, football, golf, soccer, swimming, tennis, track and field, and wrestling. Women's programs include basketball, cross country, golf, lacrosse, rowing, softball, soccer, swimming, tennis, track and field, and wrestling.

Pacific's women's wrestling program is notable as one of the nation's first five varsity programs sponsored by a college. The team competed as part of the women's division of the National Collegiate Wrestling Association, which began competition in 2007.

One of the most decorated sports at Pacific is handball, begun in 1977 under English Professor Michael Steele. Since 1981, the Boxers have appeared in 39 consecutive collegiate national tournaments and captured numerous individual and team national championships. In 2019, the team added five more national titles to its record at the United States Handball Association National Collegiate Championships.

In addition to the amenities of the Stoller Center and Lincoln Park Athletic Complex, Pacific has indoor and outdoor tennis courts on campus and shares a competition-size pool with the City of Forest Grove.

== Notable people ==
=== Faculty ===
Pacific's undergraduate faculty includes Jules Boykoff, a political scientist, poet, and activist focusing on the politics of the Olympic games. The MFA faculty has including award-winning writers such as Kwame Dawes, Tyehimba Jess, Dorianne Laux, Marvin Bell, Ellen Bass, and Garth Greenwell, among others. It has also included former professional basketball player Jeron Roberts.

Pacific University College of Optometry hired its first African American educator, Breanne McGhee, a full-time optometrist who practices in New Orleans. She works at the institution as an assistant professor and clinical adjunct.

=== Alumni ===
- Shirley Abbott '52, OD '53 — ambassador, optometrist, and dairyman
- Les AuCoin '69 — U.S. representative
- Wlnsvey Campos '17 — Oregon state representative-elect
- Loren Cordain '74 — researcher specializing in nutrition and exercise physiology
- Rick Dancer — journalist and politician
- Dick Daniels — NFL player
- Jeannine Hall Gailey 2006 (MFA) — poet
- Daniel Gault (Tualatin Academy) — state legislator, educator, and journalist
- Alfred Carlton Gilbert 1902 (Tualatin Academy) — Olympian and inventor of the Erector Set
- Mark Hashem — Hawai'i state representative
- Tim Hauck — NFL player
- David G. Hebert '94 — musicologist, musician, and professor
- Lynn Hellerstein — optometrist, speaker, and author
- William A. Hilliard '52 — journalist and editor of The Oregonian
- Augustus C. Kinney — physician and expert on tuberculosis
- Mike Kreidler '66, OD '69 — U.S. representative
- Gregg Lambert '83 — philosopher and literary theorist
- Olaus Murie '12 — conservationist and mammalogist
- Tela O'Donnell '05 — Olympic wrestler
- Robert T. Oliver '32 — author, professor, and scholar of intercultural communication
- Carol Pott '86 — author, editor, and vocalist
- Harvey W. Scott 1863 — first graduate of Pacific, editor of The Oregonian
- George Tall Chief — educator and chief of the Osage Nation
- Tommy Thayer '18 (Hon.) — musician, producer, lead guitarist of Kiss
- Barbara Thorne Stevenson — soprano
- Thomas H. Tongue 1868 — U.S. representative
- Calvin Leroy Van Pelt '49 — World War II veteran
- Nancy Wilson (non-degree, '76) — lead guitarist and vocalist in the band Heart

== See also ==
- Melville Wilkinson
- Pacific University Press
