= List of Oregon state symbols =

The obverse of the flag of Oregon, the state's flag

The U.S. state of Oregon has 33 official emblems, as designated by the Oregon State Legislature. Most of the symbols are listed in Title 19, Chapter 186 of the Oregon Revised Statutes (2011 edition). Oregon's first symbol was the motto Alis Volat Propriis, written and translated in 1854. Latin for "She Flies With Her Own Wings", the motto remained unchanged until 1957, when "The Union" became the official state motto. Alis Volat Propriis became the state motto once again in 1987. Originally designed in 1857, usage of the Oregon State Seal began after Oregon became the 33rd state of the United States on February 14, 1859. The motto and seal served as Oregon's only symbols until over 50 years later, when the Oregon-grape became the state flower in 1899. Oregon had six official symbols by 1950 and 22 symbols by 2000. The newest symbol of Oregon is the T-bone steak, declared the state steak in 2025.

While some of the symbols are unique to Oregon, others are used by multiple states. For example, the North American beaver is also the state animal of New York, and the Chinook salmon (sometimes known as the king salmon) is also the state fish of Alaska. The square dance and milk are commonly used state dances and state beverages, respectively.

== Insignia ==
Type	Symbol	Description	Adopted	Image	Note
Flag	Flag of Oregon	Oregon's flag is navy blue with gold lettering and imagery, and is the only current flag in the U.S. to have a different pattern on the reverse side. The obverse depicts the state seal with "STATE OF OREGON" displayed above and "1859" displayed below (the year Oregon was admitted to The Union). The reverse depicts a beaver in the center.	1925	A navy blue flag with gold lettering and symbols; "STATE OF OREGON" is written above a shield, which is surrounded by 33 stars. "1859" appears underneath the shield. A navy blue flag depicting a gold-colored beaver in the center.	
Motto	Alis Volat Propriis	Latin for "She Flies With Her Own Wings", Alis Volat Propriis was the motto of Oregon from 1854 until it was changed to "The Union" in 1957. Written by Judge Jesse Quinn Thornton, the original motto was adopted once again by the 1987 Legislature.	1987; 1854–1957	A blue seal that contains a Native American, a beaver, a ship, an eagle, five stars along the bottom, and the Latin phrase Alis Volat Propriis across the top.	
Seal	Oregon State Seal	In 1857, a resolution adopted by the Oregon Constitutional Convention authorized the president to appoint a committee consisting of Benjamin F. Burch, La Fayette Grover and James K. Kelly to design a new seal to be used once statehood was achieved. Harvey Gordon designed the seal, though additions were added through committee recommendations. Usage began after Oregon became the 33rd state on February 14, 1859.	1859	A navy blue seal with gold lettering and imagery. The seal contains a shield, supported by 33 stars and with an eagle with its wings spread on top; "STATE OF OREGON" is written above the eagle and "1859" appears below the shield. Within the shield appear a sun with its rays extending to two ships and a mountain and trees, two oxen pulling a covered wagon, and a ribbon containing "THE UNION".	

== Flora and fauna ==
Type	Symbol	Description	Adopted	Image	Note
Animal	North American beaver (Castor canadensis)	Found in most of the larger streams and rivers in Oregon, the beaver is the largest of the North American rodents. Once overtrapped by early settlers and prized for its fur, populations have recovered through management and partial protection. Oregon is known as "The Beaver State" and Oregon State University's athletic teams are called the Beavers.	1969	A wet rodent with coarse dark brown fur standing in water.	
Crustacean	Dungeness crab (Metacarcinus magister)	Based on lobbying from school children at Sunset Primary School in West Linn, Oregon, and citing its importance to the Oregon economy, the Oregon State Legislature designated the Dungeness crab as the state crustacean in 2009.	2009	A crab in the grass, alongside a ruler, exhibiting a purple body and five pairs of yellow legs.	
Fish	Chinook salmon (Oncorhynchus tshawytscha)	Salmon was essential for the coastal Native Americans' life, and was the subject of many legends and taboos. The largest of the Pacific salmon, the Chinook provides both sport and commercial fishing, but is under threat from dams and fishing.	1961	A fish with a blue-green back and top of the head, silvery sides, a white ventral surface, and black spots on its tail and the upper half of its body.	
Flower	Oregon-grape (Berberis aquifolium)	Native to the North American west coast, the Oregon-grape is an evergreen shrub that contains small purplish-black fruits that were included in smaller quantities in the traditional diets of Pacific Northwest aboriginal peoples. Today they are sometimes used to make jelly, alone or mixed with salal berries, another berry native to the Northwest.	1899	Clusters of yellow flowers surrounded by pointed, waxy green leaves.	
Fruit	Pear (Pyrus)	Pear orchards flourish in Oregon's river valley growing regions, producing about 800 million pears per year. Pears are Oregon's number one tree fruit crop.	2005	Two light green fruits with hints of red hanging on a tree branch and exhibiting the "pear" shape of an elongated basal portion and a bulbous end.	
Insect	Oregon swallowtail (Papilio oregonius)	Containing the word Oregon in both its common and scientific names, this swallowtail species is native to the Northwest region, primarily found in the sagebrush canyons of the Columbia River and its tributaries.	1979		
Microbe	Brewer's yeast (Saccharomyces cerevisiae)	S. cerevisiae has been instrumental to winemaking, baking and brewing since ancient times as the yeast behind the most common type of fermentation. It is a unicellular fungus about 5–10 micrometres in diameter. In addition to its role in food production, the yeast is used as a model organism for the study of aging, genomics, and other topics.	2013	S. cerevisiae under DIC microscopy	
Mushroom	Pacific golden chanterelle (Cantharellus formosus)	Most known for its "golden hue, chalice shape and delicate woodsy flavor", the Pacific golden chanterelle is a fungus found throughout Oregon's conifer forests. Tillamook State Forest annually produces one of the world's largest chanterelle harvests.	1999	Yellow, funnel-shaped fungi with gill-like ridges along the side growing from a surface of dirt and leaves.	
Nut	Hazelnut	Hazelnuts, also known as filberts, are produced in commercial quantities in Oregon, which has an ideal climate for growing the nuts. According to the state, Oregon's Willamette Valley is home to 99% of the U.S. hazelnut industry.	1989	Two round nuts, one with its shell and one without, yellow to light brown in color.	
Pet	Shelter dogs and cats	In 2023, the 82nd Oregon legislature designated sheltered dogs and cats as the state's pet with unanimous endorsement. According to the resolution, shelter pets and Oregonians "are renowned for their resilience, endurance, and the ability to overcome adversity".	2023		
Raptor	Osprey (Pandion haliaetus)	"Designated state raptor by the 2017 Legislature, declaring the large bird with its striking markings to be a fitting symbol of Oregon's rugged independence, strength and resilience, evoking Oregon’s lakes, rivers, streams and ocean".	2017		
Seashell	Oregon hairy triton (Fusitriton oregonensis)	Named oregonensis by conchologist John Howard Redfield in 1846 to honor the Oregon Territory, the Oregon hairy triton is covered with bristly periostracum and found along the West Coast, washing up at high tide.	1991	A light brown shell, covered with gray-brown bristly periostracum.	
Songbird	Western meadowlark (Sturnella neglecta)	Unofficially chosen as the state bird in 1927 by Oregon's school children in a poll sponsored by the Oregon Audubon Society, the western meadowlark is native throughout western North America and is known for its "distinctive and beautiful song." However, the Governor's proclamation based on the poll was never ratified by the Oregon Legislature. In order to correct this oversight, the western meadowlark was voted State Songbird in 2017.	2017	A bird with yellow underparts, a black "V" on the breast, and white flanks which are streaked with black	
Tree	Douglas fir (Pseudotsuga menziesii)	Named after David Douglas, a Scottish botanist who traveled through Oregon in the 1820s, the Douglas-fir is an evergreen conifer dominant throughout the region, occurring in nearly all forest types and able to compete well on most parent materials and slopes. Due to its "strength, stiffness and moderate weight", the species is an invaluable timber product.	1939	Several tall douglas-fir trees with a blue sky and water in the background.	
Vegetable	Potato	Potatoes are the number one vegetable produced in Oregon, with over 2.7 billion pounds grown annually.	2024	Potatoes in a jute sack	

== Geology ==
Type	Symbol	Description	Adopted	Image	Note
Fossil	Dawn redwood (Metasequoia glyptostroboides)	Dawn redwood flourished in the Miocene epoch and would become one of the most abundantly found fossils in Oregon today. While long extinct in the state, paleontologists discovered living 100-foot (30 m) Metasequoia trees in China more than 50 years ago and brought live trees back to the U.S. for propagation, thus ensuring their continued survival.	2005	A thick tree trunk with numerous branches breaking away as far down as the base.	
Gemstone	Oregon sunstone	Sunstones are plagioclase feldspars, which when viewed from certain directions exhibit a brilliant spangled appearance. The gemstone has increased tourism and economic development in southeastern Oregon, attracting collectors and miners to the region.	1987	A multi-surfaced, pink rock with light reflecting at various points.	
Rock	Thunderegg	Nodule-like geological structures similar to geodes, thundereggs are rough spheres found throughout Oregon, the largest deposits found in Crook, Jefferson, Malheur, Wasco and Wheeler counties. The world's largest thunderegg, a 1.75 ton specimen, is housed by the Rice Northwest Museum of Rocks and Minerals in Oregon.	1965	A cross section of a rock-like structure, with white coloring in a triangle shape on the inside and pink and light brown coloring on the outside.	
Soil	Jory soil	A very deep, well-drained soil that forms in colluvium derived from basic igneous rock and found in the foothills surrounding the Willamette Valley. These soils have been mapped on more than 300,000 acres (1,200 km^{2}) in western Oregon and are named for the Jory family, who settled in the area in 1852 after traveling along the Oregon Trail. Jory soils are productive forest soils that support Oregon's stands of Douglas fir and Oregon white oak, as well as many Oregon crops, including Christmas trees, berries, filberts, grass seed, and the grapes used in the Oregon wine industry.	2011	Cross-section of four feet of reddish-brown soil	

== Culture ==
Type	Symbol	Description	Adopted	Image	Note
Beverage	Milk	Milk was recognized as the state's beverage because the production and manufacture of dairy products are major contributors to Oregon's economy. Tillamook County is particularly known for its dairy farms. Water had also been proposed as the state beverage in the same legislative session, but that proposal was tabled in favor of milk.	1997	A red-capped bottle of milk with cream along the top.	
Dance	Square dance	A folk dance with four couples (eight dancers) arranged in a square, the "lively spirit of the [square] dance exemplifies the friendly, free nature and enthusiasm that are a part of the Oregon Character." The "Oregon Waltz" had been proposed as the state waltz in 1997, but the proposal was rejected.	1977	A group of dancers in colorful Western clothing promenading in a circle, with a man speaking into a microphone on a stage in the background.	
Father	Dr. John McLoughlin	McLoughlin was the chief factor of the Columbia Fur District of the Hudson's Bay Company at Fort Vancouver. In the late 1840s his general store in Oregon City was famous as the last stop on the Oregon Trail. He became designated as the "Father of Oregon" for his role in assisting the American cause in the Oregon Country.	1957	An elderly man with black clothing and white hair down to his shoulders.	
Hostess	Miss Oregon	Founded in 1947 as the Miss Oregon Pageant by merchants in the coastal city of Seaside, the competition is a regional scholarship contest and beauty pageant that selects the representative for Oregon in the Miss America pageant. The annual event includes contestants from across the state and awards scholarships to the participants.	1969	A young woman and an older man, both dressed in formal wear, leaning over to sign a poster.	
Mother	Tabitha Moffatt Brown	Brown was a pioneer emigrant who traveled the Oregon Trail to the Oregon Country, where she helped to found Tualatin Academy, which would grow to become Pacific University in Forest Grove, Oregon. Brown was titled the "Mother of Oregon" for representing the "distinctive pioneer heritage and the charitable and compassionate nature of Oregon's people."	1987	A black and white picture of an elderly woman wearing a white bonnet and dark clothing.	
Pie	Marionberry pie	The 2017 Legislature designated the Marionberry pie as the official pie of Oregon due to its "mouthwatering and delightful when served by themselves, à la mode or garnished with whipped cream".	2017		
Song	"Oregon, My Oregon"	In 1920, the Society of Oregon Composers held a competition to select a state song. The winning entry was a collaboration between lyricist John Andrew Buchanan and composer Henry Bernard Murtagh.	1927	Sheet music, including the lyrics and music of the song.	
Statehood pageant	Champoeg Historical Pageant	Each summer, the Champoeg Historical Pageant takes place at Champoeg State Park, where the first Oregon government was formed. The Oregon Parks and Recreation Department encourages the development of the pageant and promotes increased attendance at its performances.	1987	The Pioneer Mothers Memorial Cabin Museum, a single-story log cabin.	
Steak	T-bone steak	The T-bone steak is a cut of beef including both strip and tenderloin steaks. The Oregon Cattlewomen recommended the T-bone steak because of the similarity of the bone in the middle of the steak to the Cascade Mountains that similarly split Oregon.	2025		
Tartan	Oregon tartan	Designed by Robbie Harding of Bend: Blue represents the blue of the flag of Oregon and the waters of the ocean, lakes, and rivers; Gold represents the center color of the flag of Oregon and the agricultural regions of the state; Green represents the forests; White represents the mountains; Taupe represents the high desert and grasslands; Crimson represents the cinder buttes; Azure represents the streams, creeks, marshes, lakes, and skies; Black represents the obsidian buttes	2017		
Team	Portland Trail Blazers of 1990–1991	The Trail Blazers of 1990–1991 were designated as the official team of Oregon for their success in setting a franchise record of 63 victories, including a 16-game winning streak.	1991	One side of a building mostly of glass windows, with a covered entrance extending to a brick plaza. Two trees grow alongside the building, and a partly cloudy sky appears in the background.	

== Unofficial symbols and unsuccessful proposals ==
While most states have an official nickname, the Oregon Legislature never officially adopted one. Oregon's unofficial nickname is "The Beaver State". Unofficial tourism advertising for Oregon has included the slogans "Things Look Different Here" and "Oregon, We Love Dreamers", the latter of which alludes to the "basic sense of idealism" of the state's culture. In the 1950s and 60s, Oregon license plates featured the unofficial motto, "Pacific Wonderland".

Several symbols have been proposed for addition to the list of official state symbols but were never adopted. The "Oregon Waltz" was approved as the state waltz by the Oregon House in 1997, but the proposal did not succeed in the Senate. In 2001, legislation designating the Kiger Mustang, a horse breed unique to southeastern Oregon, as the state horse was introduced, but not adopted. It was suggested in 2003 that Oregon have an official state tartan, but the bill never passed out of committee, with a state tartan finally being adopted in 2017.

== See also ==
- Lists of Oregon-related topics
