= Frank Fletcher =

Frank Fletcher may refer to:

- Frank Friday Fletcher (1855–1928), U.S. Navy admiral, namesake of the USS Fletcher (DD-445)
- Frank Jack Fletcher (1885–1973), U.S. Navy admiral, namesake of the USS Fletcher (DD-992)
- Frank Fletcher (baseball) (1891–1974), Philadelphia Phillies player
- Frank D. Fletcher, Chief Officer of the SY Aurora during the Australasian Antarctic Expedition
- Frank Morley Fletcher (1866–1950), British painter and printmaker
- Frank Fletcher (footballer) (1874–1936), English footballer

== See also ==
- Frank Fletcher Hamilton (1921–2008), Canadian politician
- Francis Fletcher (1814–1871), pioneer of the U.S. state of Oregon
- Francis Fletcher (priest) (c. 1555–c. 1619), Church of England priest who accompanied Sir Francis Drake on his circumnavigation of the world
