= List of U.S. state and territory mottos =

Eureka, the motto of California on its state seal

Nil sine numine, the motto of Colorado on its state seal

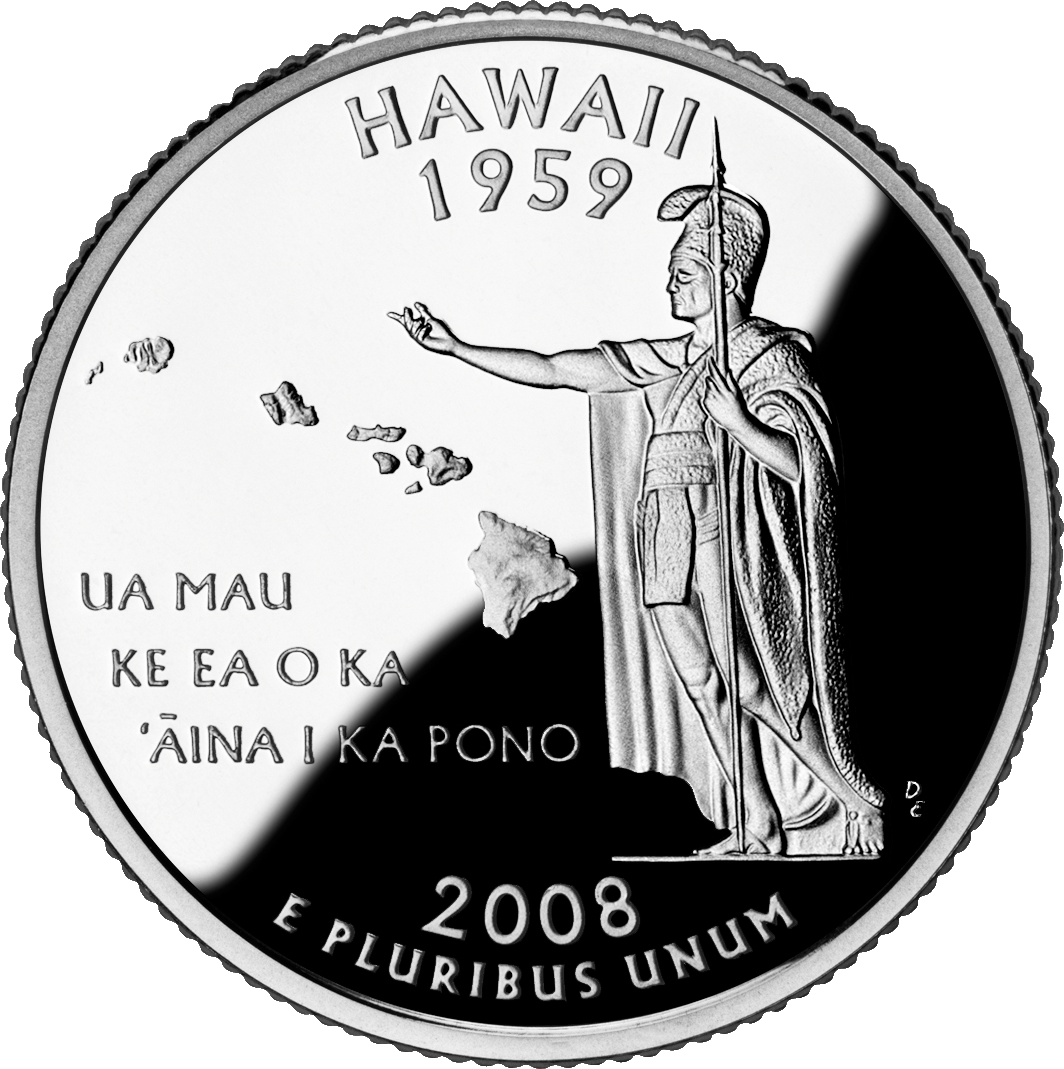
Ua Mau ke Ea o ka ʻĀina i ka Pono, the motto of Hawaii on its state quarter

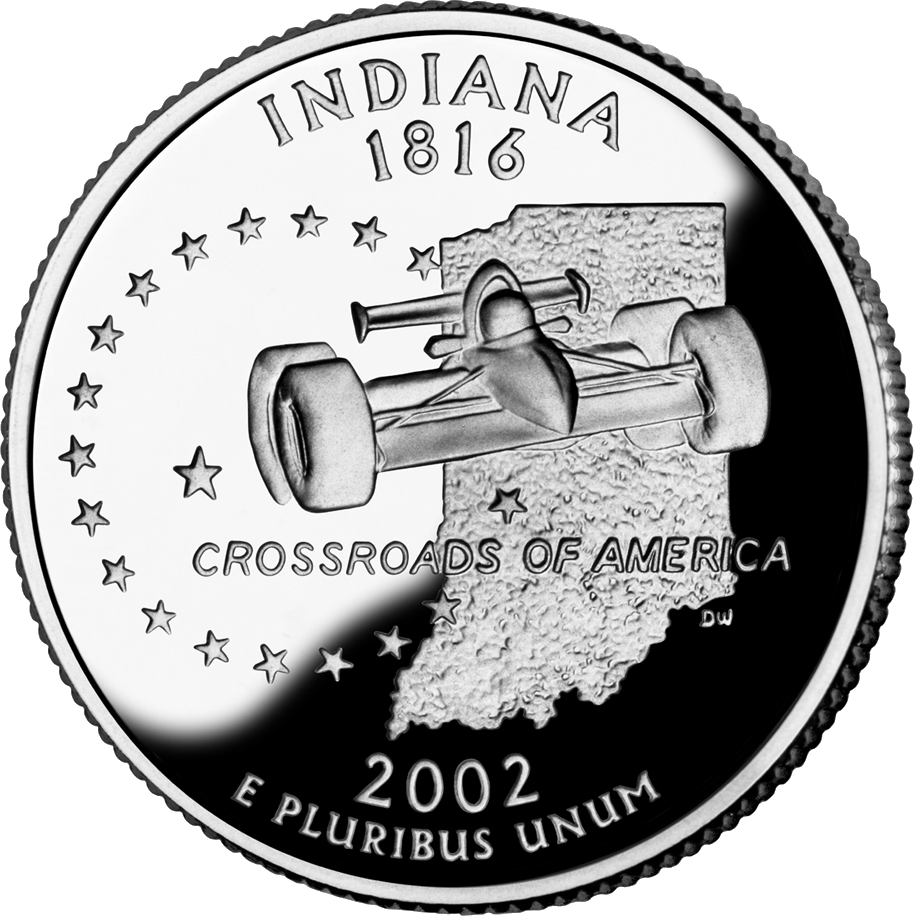
Crossroads of America, the motto of Indiana on its state quarter

Ad astra per aspera, the motto of Kansas on its state seal

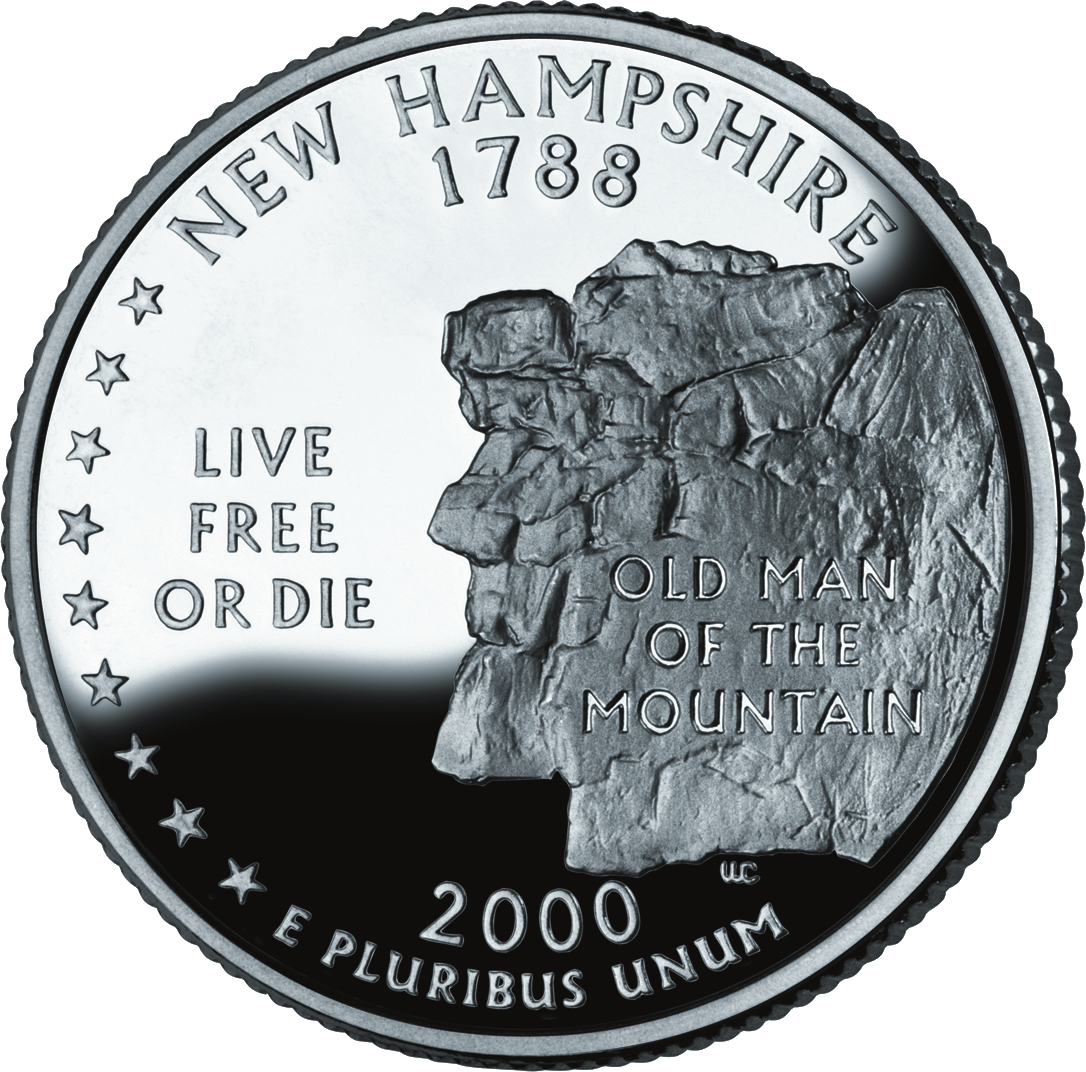
Live Free or Die, the motto of New Hampshire on its state quarter

Labor omnia vincit, the motto of Oklahoma on its state seal

South Carolina has two state mottos on its state seal

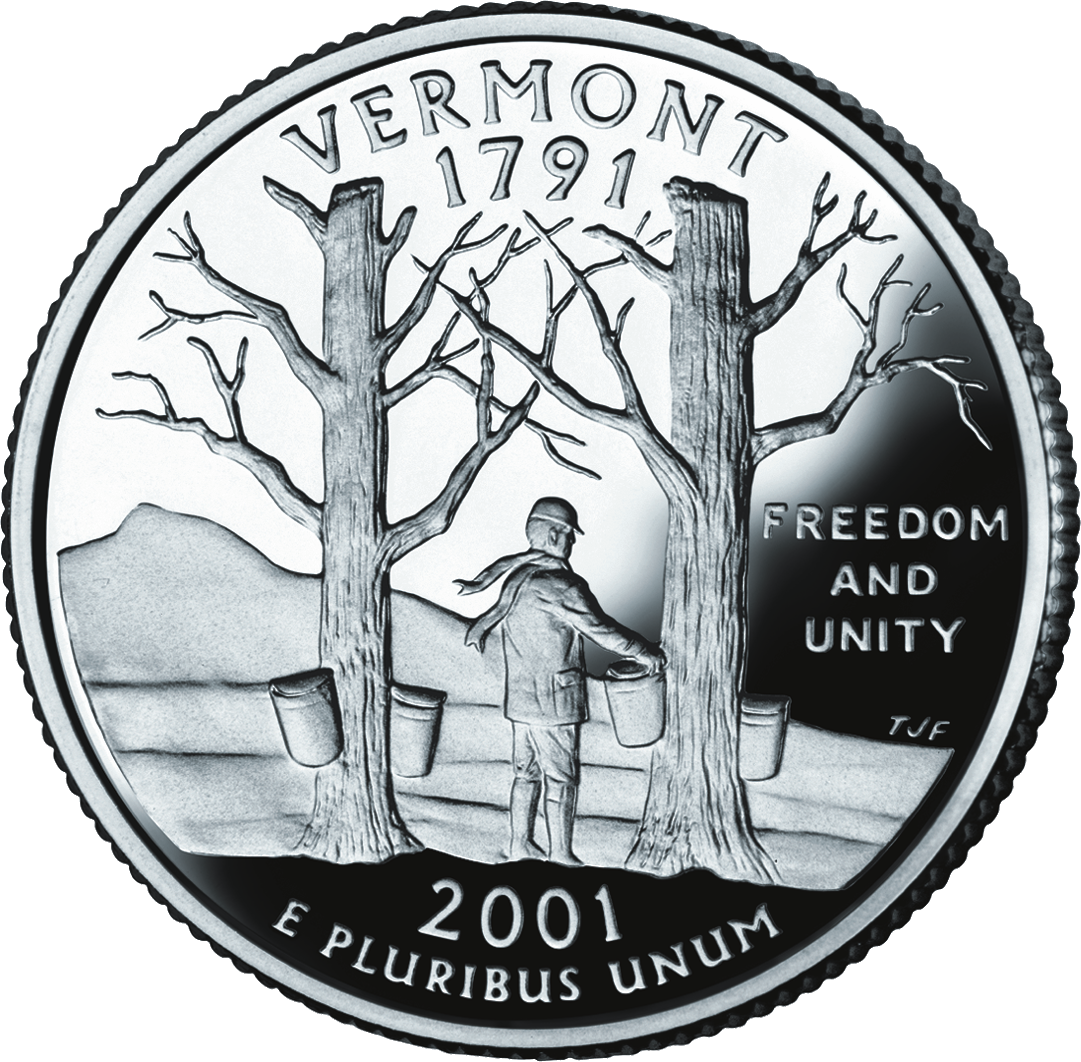
Freedom and Unity, the motto of Vermont on its state quarter

Salus populi suprema lex esto, the motto of Missouri on its state seal

All of the United States' 50 states have a state motto, as do the District of Columbia and 3 of its territories. A motto is a phrase intended to formally describe the general motivation or intention of an organization. State mottos can sometimes be found on state seals or state flags. Some states have officially designated a state motto by an act of the state legislature, whereas other states have the motto only as an element of their seals. The motto of the United States itself is In God We Trust, proclaimed by Congress and signed into law by President Dwight D. Eisenhower on July 30, 1956. The motto "E pluribus unum" (Latin for 'out of many, one') was approved for use on the Great Seal of the United States in 1782, but was never adopted as the national motto through legislative action.

South Carolina has two official mottos, both which are in Latin. Kentucky, North Dakota, and Vermont also have two mottos, one in Latin and the other in English. All other states and territories have only one motto, except for Guam and the Northern Mariana Islands, which do not have any mottos. English and Latin are the most-used languages for state mottos, each used by 25 states and territories. Seven states and territories use another language, of which each language is only used once. Eight states and two territories have their mottos on their state quarter; thirty-eight states and four territories have their mottos on their state seals.

The dates given are, where possible, the earliest date that the motto was used in an official sense. Some state mottos are not official but are on the official state seal; in these cases the adoption date of the seal is given. The earliest use of a current motto is that of Puerto Rico, Joannes est nomen ejus, granted to the island by the Spanish in 1511.

== State, federal district and territory mottos ==
Jurisdiction	Motto	English translation	Language	Date	Ref.
Alabama	Audemus jura nostra defendere	We dare maintain our rights	Latin	1923	
Alaska	North to the Future	—N/a	English	1967	
American Samoa	Sāmoa, Muamua Le Atua	Samoa, let Atua be first	Samoan	1973	
Arizona	Ditat Deus	God enriches	Latin	1863	
Arkansas	Regnat populus (Note: The motto was originally designated as Regnant populi in 1864. It was changed to Regnat populus in 1907.)	The people rule	Latin	1907	
California	Eureka (Εὕρηκα)	I have found it	Greek	1849 (Note: Eureka first appeared on the state seal in 1849. It was designated the official motto in 1963.)	
Colorado	Nil sine numine	Nothing without providence	Latin	November 6, 1861	
Connecticut	Qui transtulit sustinet	He who transplanted still sustains	Latin	October 9, 1662	
Delaware	Liberty and Independence	—N/a	English	1847	
District of Columbia	Justitia Omnibus	Justice for all	Latin	August 3, 1871	
Florida	In God We Trust	—N/a	English	1868 (Note: "In God We Trust" first appeared on the state seal in 1868. It was designated the official motto in 2006.)	
Georgia	Wisdom, Justice, Moderation (Note: Georgia never officially adopted a state motto; the words wisdom, justice, and moderation come from its state seal.)	—N/a	English	1798	
Guam	—N/a	—N/a	—N/a	—N/a	
Hawaiʻi	Ua mau ke ea o ka ʻāina i ka pono	The life of the land is perpetuated in righteousness/*The sovereignty of the land is perpetuated in righteousness: When first said by King Kamehameha III in July 1843, it originally meant "The sovereignty of the land is perpetuated in righteousness." The State of Hawaiʻi's official website translates the saying as "The life of the land is perpetuated in righteousness." In Hawaiian, Ea means life but also sovereignty, leading to this slight difference in translation.	Hawaiian	July 31, 1843 (Note: The motto of Hawaiʻi was first used by King Kamehameha III in 1843, after his restoration. In May 1845 it first appeared on the coat of arms of the Kingdom of Hawaiʻi. It was made the official motto of the State of Hawaiʻi on May 1, 1959.)	
Idaho	Esto perpetua	Let it be perpetual	Latin	1890	
Illinois	State sovereignty, national union	—N/a	English	1819	
Indiana	Crossroads of America	—N/a	English	1937	
Iowa	Our liberties we prize and our rights we will maintain	—N/a	English	1847	
Kansas	Ad astra per aspera	To the stars through difficulties	Latin	1861	
Kentucky	United we stand, divided we fall	—N/a	English	1942	
Kentucky	Deo gratiam habeamus	Let us be grateful to God	Latin	2002	
Louisiana	Union, justice, confidence	—N/a	English	1902	
Maine	Dirigo	I direct	Latin	1820	
Maryland	Fatti maschi, parole femine	Strong deeds, gentle words	Italian	1874	
Massachusetts	Ense petit placidam sub libertate quietem	By the sword we seek peace, but peace only under liberty	Latin	1775	
Michigan	Si quaeris peninsulam amoenam circumspice	If you seek a pleasant peninsula, look about you	Latin	June 2, 1835	
Minnesota	L'Étoile du Nord (Note: The unofficial motto of the Minnesota Territory was Quae sursum volo videre, I long to see what is beyond, chosen in 1849.)	The star of the North	French	1861	
Mississippi	Virtute et armis	By valor and arms	Latin	February 7, 1894	
Missouri	Salus populi suprema lex esto	The welfare of the people shall be the supreme law	Latin	January 11, 1822	
Montana	Oro y plata	Gold and silver	Spanish	February 9, 1865	
Nebraska	Equality before the law	—N/a	English	1867	
Nevada	All For Our Country (Note: The unofficial motto of the Nevada Territory was Volens et potens, 'willing and able', which was on the territorial seal approved on November 29, 1861. This was changed to the current motto after statehood.)	—N/a	English	February 24, 1866	
New Hampshire	Live Free or Die	—N/a	English	1945	
New Jersey	Liberty and prosperity	—N/a	English	March 26, 1928	
New Mexico	Crescit eundo	It grows as it goes	Latin	1887 (Note: Crescit eundo was added to the territorial seal in 1882. This change was officially adopted by the legislature in 1887.)	
New York	Excelsior	Ever upward	Latin	1778	
North Carolina	Esse quam videri	To be, rather than to seem	Latin	1893	
North Dakota	Liberty and union, now and forever, one and inseparable	—N/a	English	January 3, 1863	
North Dakota	Serit ut alteri saeclo prosit	One sows for the benefit of another age	Latin	March 11, 2011	
Northern Mariana Islands	—N/a	—N/a	—N/a	—N/a	
Ohio	With God, all things are possible (Note: From 1866 to 1868, the motto Imperium in Imperio (Latin for 'Empire within an Empire') appeared on the state seal.)	—N/a	English	October 1, 1959	
Oklahoma	Labor omnia vincit	Labor conquers all things	Latin	March 10, 1893 (Note: Labor omnia vincit was on the territorial seal of 1893.) (Note: It was specified as a feature of the seal in the 1907 State Constitution.)	
Oregon	Alis volat propriis	She flies with her own wings	Latin	1854 (Note: The motto of Oregon was "The Union" from 1957 until 1987, when the original 1854 motto of Alis volat propriis was restored. "The Union" is still present on the official state seal and flag.)	
Pennsylvania	Virtue, liberty, and independence	—N/a	English	1875	
Puerto Rico	Joannes Est Nomen Ejus	John is his name	Latin	1511 (Note: The Spanish Crown gave Puerto Rico its coat of arms in 1511. The Commonwealth of Puerto Rico officially adopted it on March 9, 1905.)	
Rhode Island	Hope	—N/a	English	May 4, 1664	
South Carolina	Dum spiro spero	While I breathe, I hope	Latin	May 22, 1777	
South Carolina	Animis opibusque parati	Prepared in mind and resources	Latin	May 22, 1777	
South Dakota	Under God the people rule	—N/a	English	1885	
Tennessee	Agriculture and Commerce	—N/a	English	May 24, 1802 (Note: The words agriculture and commerce appeared on the first state seal of 1802. "Agriculture and Commerce" was made the official state motto in 1987.)	
Texas	Friendship	—N/a	English	1930	
Utah	Industry	—N/a	English	May 3, 1896 (Note: Industry first appeared on the state seal of 1896. It was designated the official motto on March 4, 1959.)	
Vermont	Freedom and Unity	—N/a	English	February 20, 1779	
Vermont	Stella quarta decima fulgeat	May the fourteenth star shine bright	Latin	April 10, 2015	
Virginia	Sic semper tyrannis	Thus always to tyrants	Latin	1776	
U.S. Virgin Islands	United in Pride and Hope	—N/a	English	January 1, 1991	
Washington	Al-ki or Alki (Unofficial) (Note: The motto of Washington is the only one to be fully unofficial. It is neither on the seal nor designated by the state legislature, but was present on the territorial seal.)	By and by	Chinook Jargon	—N/a	
West Virginia	Montani semper liberi	Mountaineers are always free	Latin	September 26, 1863	
Wisconsin	Forward	—N/a	English	1851	
Wyoming	Equal Rights	—N/a	English	1893	

== See also ==
- List of national mottos
- List of U.S. state nicknames
- List of U.S. state tourism slogans
- United States national motto
