= Alis volat propriis =

Motto of Oregon

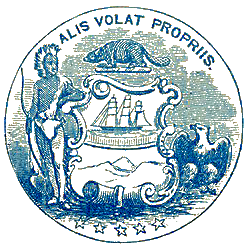
Seal of the Oregon Territory with the Latin phrase Alis volat propriis

Alis volat propriis is a Latin phrase used as the motto of the U.S. state of Oregon.

The official English version of the motto is "She flies with her own wings" in keeping with the tradition of considering countries and territories to be feminine. However, because the feminine pronoun in the Latin sentences is often omitted and the verb form is not inflected for gender, the phrase could be translated with equal validity as "[one] flies with [one's] own wings", "[he] flies with [his] own wings", or "[it] flies with [its] own wings".

If macrons are used to indicate the long vowels (standard practice in Latin dictionaries and textbooks), then the phrase becomes Ālīs volat propriīs.

The motto was written in English by the judge Jesse Quinn Thornton, and its Latin translation was added to the Territorial Seal adopted by the Oregon Territorial Legislature in 1854. The motto referred to the May 2, 1843, vote by Oregon Country settlers at the third Champoeg Meeting to form a provisional government independent of the United States and Great Britain. During the American Civil War of 1861 to 1865 the motto on the state seal was changed to "The Union." In 1957, the Oregon Legislature officially changed the motto to "The Union" reflecting conflicting views about slavery in Oregon's early days.

In 1987, the legislature readopted the original motto, which it felt better reflected Oregon's independent spirit. The sponsors of the bill that changed the motto back to alis volat propriis included the Oregon Secretary of State and later Governor Barbara Roberts, President of the Oregon Senate Jason Boe, and Senate historian Cecil Edwards.

In 1999, after a short debate in committee, the Oregon House of Representatives took a vote on HB 2269, which would revert the state motto to "The Union". The bill failed to pass on a 30–30 tie vote.

The current Oregon State Seal, which appears on the obverse of the state flag, still features the motto "The Union."

== In popular culture ==
Portland Thorns FC, a member of the National Women's Soccer League, has adopted the motto and used it on their website and occasionally on merchandise.

A trade paperback collection of Marvel Comics's Captain Marvel published in 2015 is titled Alis Volat Propriis. The book's author, Kelly Sue DeConnick, is a resident of Oregon.

In the third installment of the BioShock video game series, BioShock Infinite, the phrase appears on a metal plate in the early 20th century-style dystopia, Columbia, set within the paving stones on the side of the main street.

The ring named “She flies with her own wings” was featured in House of the Dragon.
