= Francis Fletcher =

American pioneer in Oregon

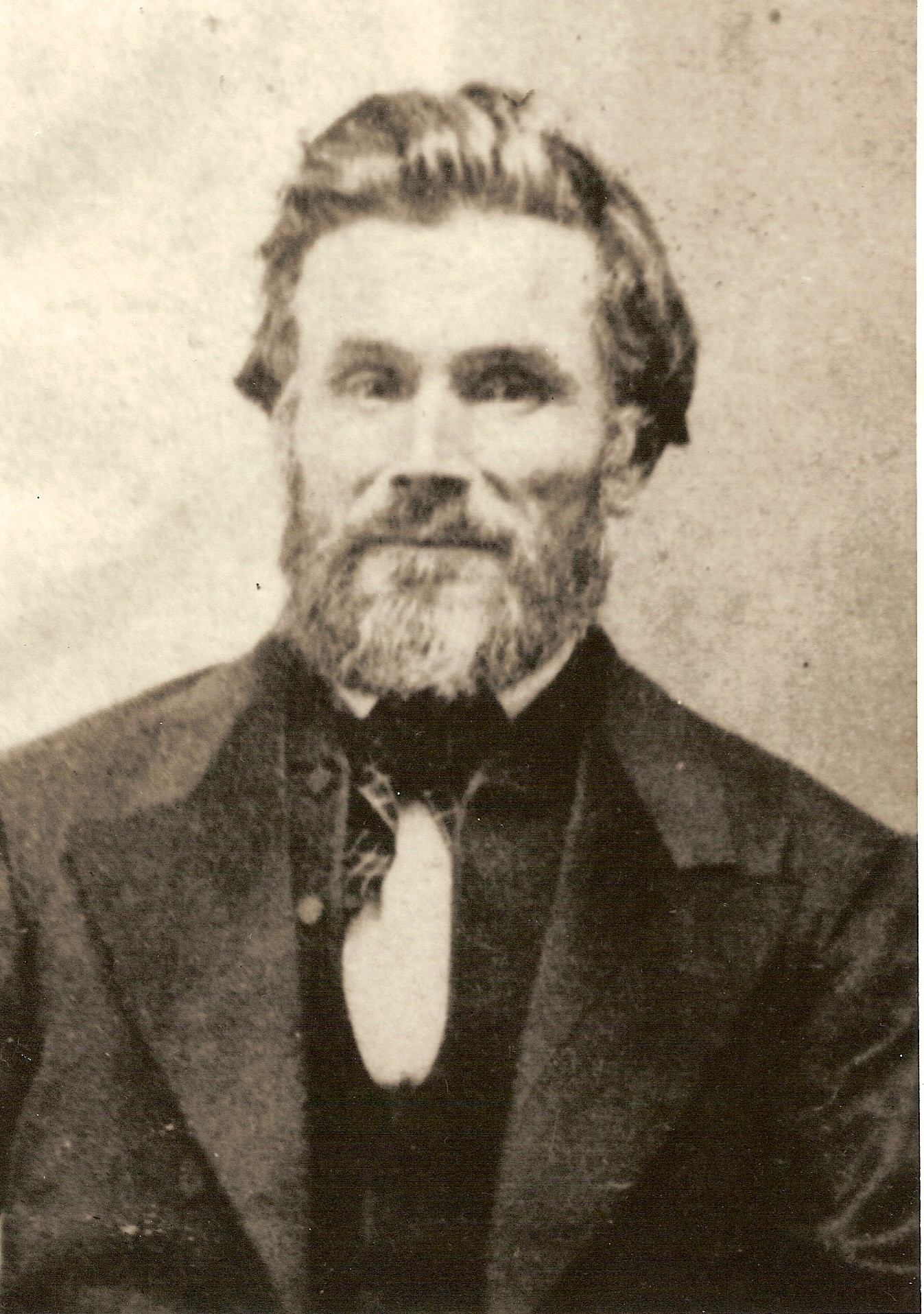
- Francis Fletcher
- Born: March 1, 1814; Allerston, Yorkshire, England
- Died: October 7, 1871 (aged 57); Dayton, Oregon
- Burial place: Brookside Cemetery, Dayton, Oregon
- Occupation: Farmer
- Known for: Early Oregon Trail Pioneer; Voted for the Oregon Provisional Government at Champoeg

Francis Fletcher (March 1, 1814 – October 7, 1871) was a prominent pioneer of the U.S. state of Oregon and a member of the Peoria Party.

== Biography ==
Born in Allerston, Yorkshire, England, he immigrated with his parents, William and Mary Fletcher and four brothers, to Nassagaweya Township, Ontario, Canada in 1825. Moving as a young man to Peoria, Illinois he joined the Oregon Dragoons and traveled overland on what was to become the Oregon Trail, arriving in the Willamette Valley of Oregon in 1840. There he took a Donation Land Claim along the Yamhill River adjacent to his lifelong friend and fellow dragoon Amos Cook. On May 2, 1843, Cook and Fletcher were among the settlers present at Champoeg, Oregon who voted to create the Provisional Government of Oregon, the first American government west of the Rocky Mountains.

== Personal ==
In 1843 he married Miss Elizabeth Smith who had arrived in the Willamette Valley earlier that year after crossing the Oregon Trail with her parents, Andrew and Polly Smith. The Fletchers raised eight children. Fletcher volunteered for service in the Cayuse War of 1848 and was on the first board of trustees of Willamette University. He died on his farm near Dayton, Oregon and is buried in Brookside Cemetery. His house in Dayton is on the National Register of Historic Places.
