= Jesse Quinn Thornton =

American judge in Oregon (1810–1888)

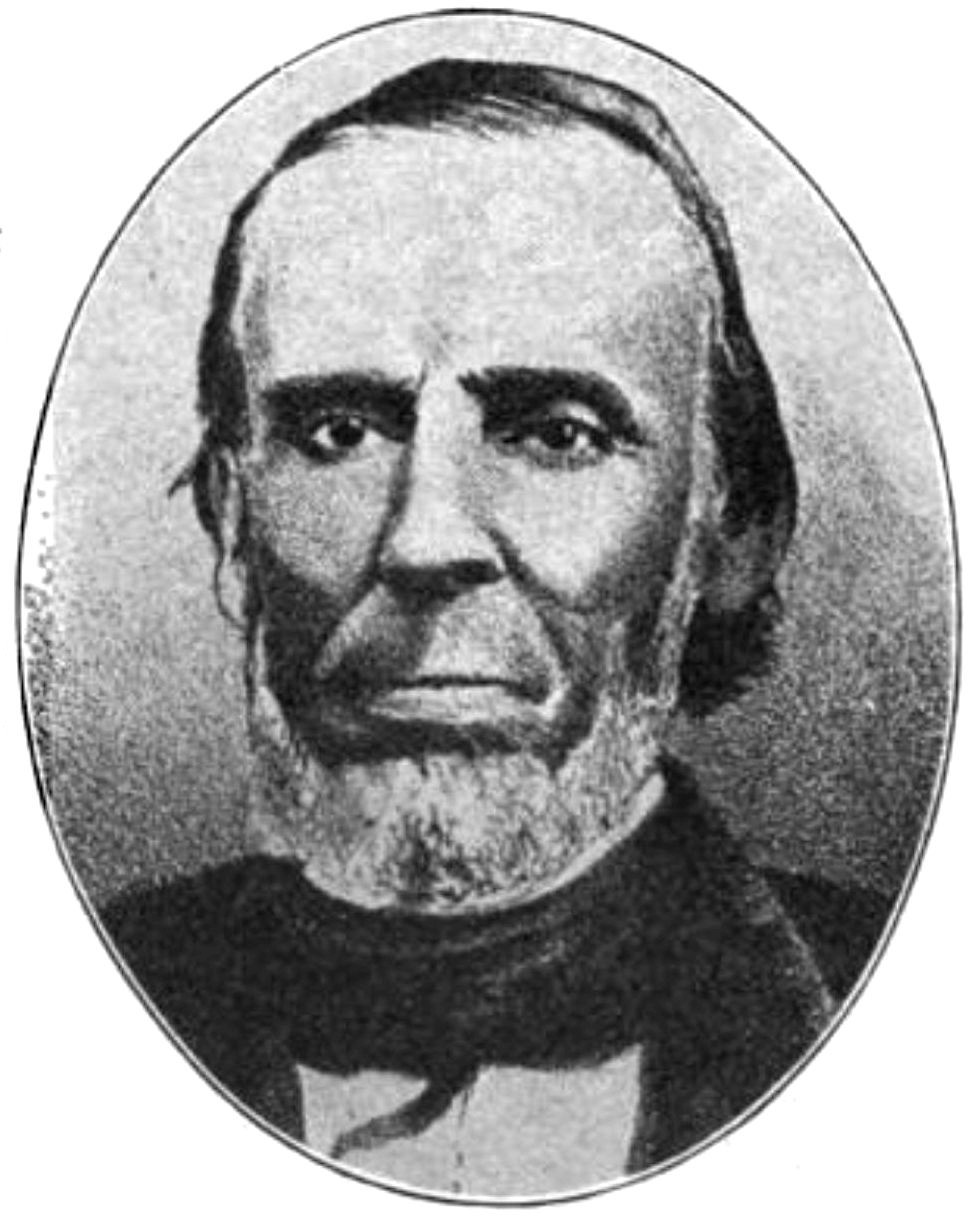

6th Supreme Judge of the Provisional Government of Oregon
- In office February 20, 1847 – November 9, 1847
- Appointed by: George Abernethy
- Preceded by: Peter Hardeman Burnett
- Succeeded by: Columbia Lancaster

Member of the Oregon House of Representatives
- In office 1864–1865
- Constituency: Benton County

Personal details
- Born: August 24, 1810 Point Pleasant, Virginia
- Died: February 5, 1888 (aged 77) Salem, Oregon
- Party: Republican
- Spouse: Agnes M. "Nancy" Huston Logue (m. 1838)

Jesse Quinn Thornton (1810–1888) was an American settler of Oregon, active in political, legal, and educational circles. He served as the 6th Supreme Judge of the Provisional Government of Oregon, presented Oregon's petition for official territorial status to Congress, served in the Oregon Legislature, and wrote the state's motto.

== Biography ==
=== Early life ===
Jesse Quinn Thornton was born August 24, 1810, near Point Pleasant, Virginia (now West Virginia). He grew up in Champaign County, Ohio, and studied law in London for nearly three years. Returning to the United States, he read law in Virginia and was admitted to the bar in 1833, afterward attending lectures at the University of Virginia. In 1835, Thornton moved to Palmyra in western Missouri, where he practiced law; he also edited a newspaper.

On February 8, 1838, he married the widowed Agnes M. "Nancy" Huston Logue, a teacher. Thornton, an abolitionist, ran into difficulty in pro-slavery Missouri and in 1841 he and his wife moved across the Mississippi River to Quincy, Illinois. Thornton corresponded with newspaper editor Horace Greeley and was acquainted with senators Thomas Hart Benton of Missouri and Stephen A. Douglas of Illinois.

=== Oregon ===
Hoping to improve their health, the Thorntons decided to emigrate to Oregon. They left Quincy on April 18, 1846, and after a brief stop in Independence, Missouri, joined the William H. Russell wagon train on May 15. This company was made up of travelers bound for both Oregon and California; among the latter were many of the emigrants who later formed the Donner Party. On June 1 Thornton and his partner John B. Goode became involved in a dispute about their wagon and team, and the following day arbitrators requested the Oregon-bound wagons to leave the group.

When they reached Fort Hall, near present-day Pocatello, Idaho, Thornton's party met Jesse Applegate, Lindsay Applegate, David Goff, and Levi Scott, who were authorized by the Provisional Government of Oregon to survey a new route to the Willamette Valley that would avoid the Columbia River. On August 9, 1846, Thornton's group set off on the California Trail, which they followed until they reached central Nevada. From there the new Applegate Trail (also called the Southern Route) went northwest and entered Oregon from the south.

The road built by the party was inadequate for wagon travel and required the first group to take it to make many improvements, slowing their progress. Some emigrants, including the Thorntons, were forced to abandon their wagons and possessions along the way. On November 30, 1846, Thornton arrived at Salt Creek in Yamhill District and soon after wrote a letter to the editor of the Oregon Spectator pleading for the settlers to send relief parties to the Umpqua Valley to save the belated emigrants.

=== Politics ===
On February 20, 1847, Governor George Abernethy of the Provisional Government appointed Thornton to the position of Supreme Judge where he served until November 9, 1847. He resigned when Abernathy asked him to go to Washington, D.C., as a delegate from the Provisional Government to present Oregon's bill requesting official territorial status to Congress.

He sailed for the east on the ship Whiton along with a memorial created by the Provisional Legislature of Oregon. During a one-month layover in San Francisco he met survivors of the Donner Party, who provided him with information about their disastrous journey to California. Thornton arrived in Boston in May 1848 and spent the summer in the East until the creation of Oregon Territory on August 14, 1848. During his travels Thornton wrote up his overland diary, which was published as Oregon and California in 1848 in early 1849. After his legislative work was done, Thornton returned to Oregon and practiced law in the Willamette Valley.

Thornton's motto "She flies with her own wings," translated into Latin as Alis volat propriis, was adopted as the motto of Oregon Territory and incorporated into the territorial seal by an act of the Territorial Legislature on January 18, 1854. In 1864 and 1865, Thornton returned to politics when he served in the Oregon House of Representatives as a Republican from Benton County.

From 1872 until 1888 he served on the board of trustees for Willamette University in Salem.

=== Death and legacy ===
Thornton died in Salem on February 5, 1888, and was buried at Lee Mission Cemetery. Mrs. Thornton died the following year and is buried beside him. They had no children of their own, but left an adopted daughter.

== Works ==
- Oregon and California in 1848. In two volumes. New York: Harper and Brothers, 1849. Vol. 1 | Vol. 2
- "History of the Provisional Government of Oregon," from Constitution and Quotations from the Register of the Oregon Pioneer Association, Together with the Annual Address of Hon. S.F. Chadwick, Remarks of Gov. L.F. Grover, at Reunion, June 1874, and Other Matters of Interest. Salem, OR: E.M. Waite, 1875; pp. 43–96.
