= Flag of Oregon =

U.S. state flag

State of Oregon
- Use: Civil and state flag
- Proportion: 500:833
- Adopted: February 26, 1925; 101 years ago
- Design: (Obverse) A state seal in gold on a navy blue field. Above the seal the text "State of Oregon" is displayed in a wavy flow and "1859" at the bottom of the state seal.
- Designed by: Oregon Legislature; first sewn by Marjorie Kennedy and Blanche Cox.
- Use: Civil and state flag
- Proportion: 500:833
- Design: (Reverse) A gold figure of a beaver, the state animal (The hoist is to the right.)

The flag of Oregon is a two-sided flag in navy blue and gold with an optional gold fringe. On the front is the escutcheon from the state seal, and on the reverse is a gold figure of a beaver, the state animal. Oregon is the only U.S. state to feature different designs on either side of its flag.

== Statute ==
The 2023 Oregon Revised Statutes, Volume 5, Chapter 186, § 186.010, defines that the state flag shall:

...bear on one side on a navy blue field the state escutcheon in gold, supported by 33 gold stars and bearing above the escutcheon the words "State of Oregon" in gold and below the escutcheon the figures "1859" in gold, and on the other side on a navy blue field a representation of the beaver in gold.

=== Design of the escutcheon ===
The design of the escutcheon is described through the law defining the state seal (OR Rev Stat § 186.010), which provides the following description:

Shield: ...divided by an ordinary, with the inscription, "The Union." In chief – mountains, an elk with branching antlers, a wagon, the Pacific Ocean, on which there are a British man-of-war departing and an American steamer arriving. The second – quartering with a sheaf, plow and a pickax. Crest: The American eagle.

== Design and symbolism ==
The navy blue flag field with lettering and symbols in gold, represents the state colors of Oregon. The 33 stars surrounding the shield represents Oregon's admission to the Union as the 33rd state. Below the shield is written 1859, the year in which Oregon became a state.

Oregon's flag is the last remaining state flag in the U.S. in which the obverse and reverse sides have different designs. On the reverse of the flag is a depiction, also in gold, of a beaver, the state animal of Oregon. Two-sided flags were previously more common, but have been reduced due to increased costs of manufacturing a flag with two different designs. Paraguay is the only country that still has a two-sided flag.

For dress or parade use, the flag may feature a gold fringe. For standard use, no fringe is required. The officially, legally defined ratio of the flag's width to its length is 500:833, though in modern practice the ratio can be 3:5 or 2:3.

It is one of nine U.S. state flags to feature an eagle, alongside those of Illinois, Iowa, Michigan, Missouri, New York, North Dakota, Pennsylvania, and Wyoming.

== History ==
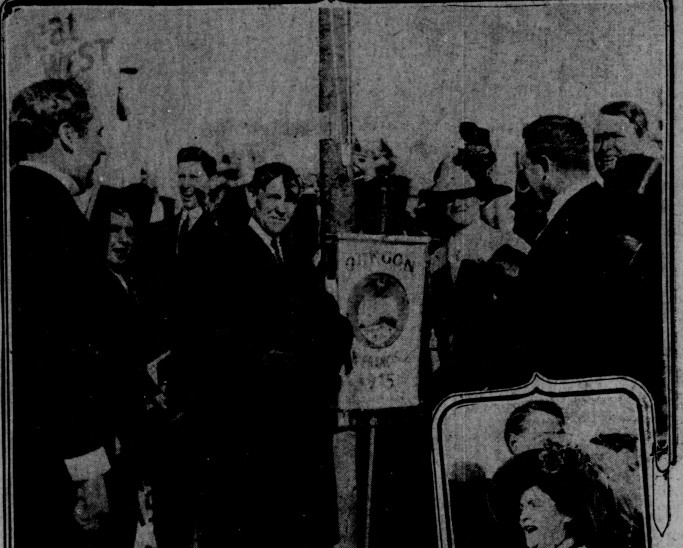
Oregon's 1915 Exposition banner (obverse)

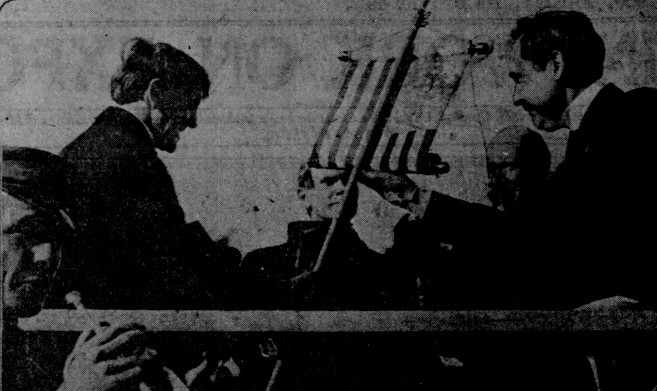
(reverse)

Flags similar to the official flag have been in use since as early as 1888.

The first mention of a state flag was in 1915. The flag was described in Ben W. Olcott's Blue Book.

A banner was used to represent the state during the Panama–Pacific International Exposition in 1915. The front of the banner had a white background with the state seal in the center. The word "OREGON" was placed above the seal and the words "Exposition 1915" were placed below the seal. The backside contained the American flag.

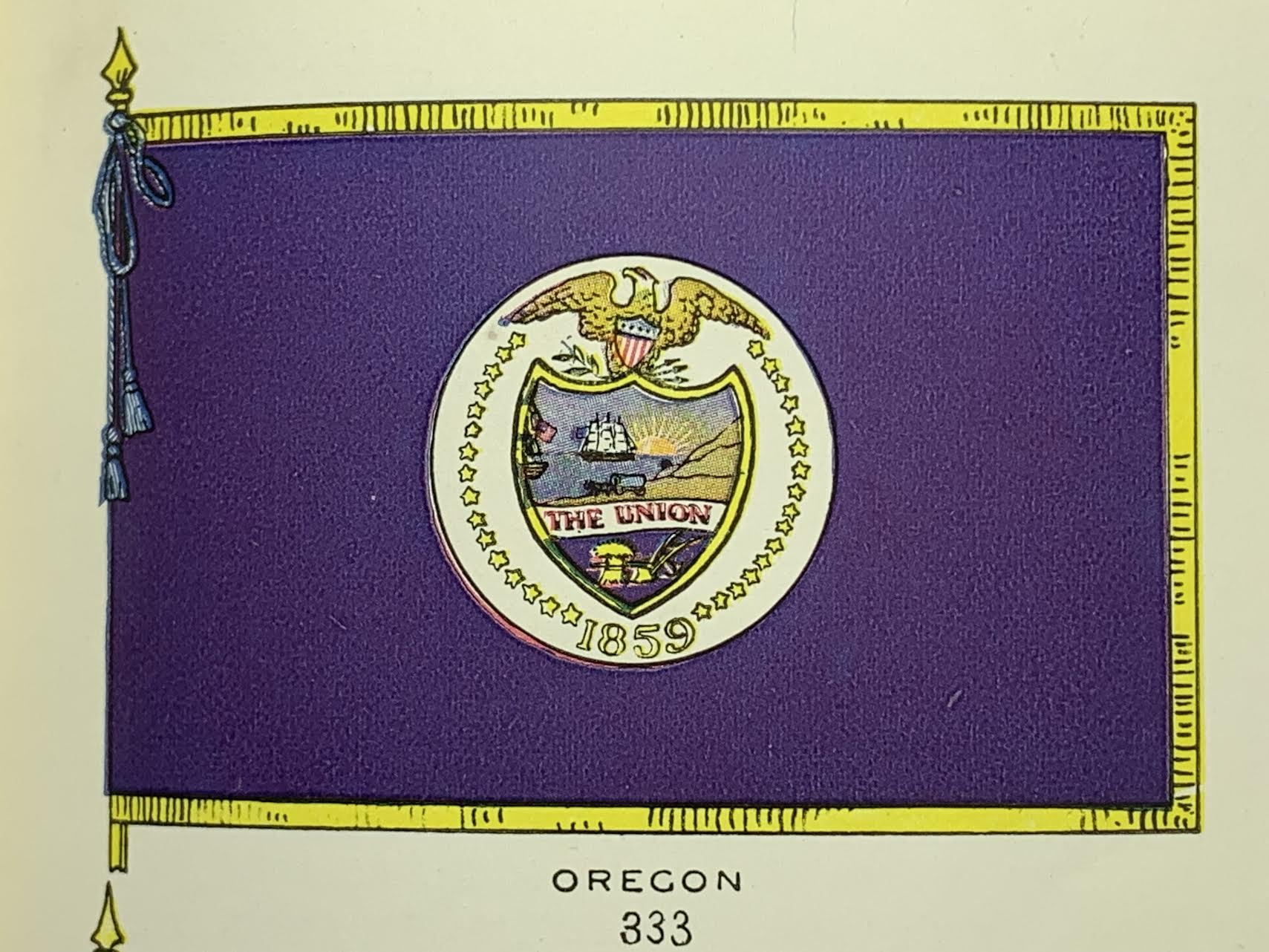
A flag depicted in National Geographic, 1917

A 1917 issue of National Geographic Magazine on U.S. state flags featured a state flag with a blue background, in the center is a multi-colored state seal on a white oval disc.

On April 18, 1920, the National society of daughters of the American revolution was holding a convention in Washington D.C. with representatives from the state being sent. The delegates carried with them a state flag that made from funds raised by the local chapters in the state. The flag was described as being 3 x 5 feet, having a blue field with the state seal in the center and a yellow stripe running around the border of the flag.

In September of 1920, members of American legion used a state flag that bore a white field with a golden state seal in the center.

=== Current flag (1925–present) ===
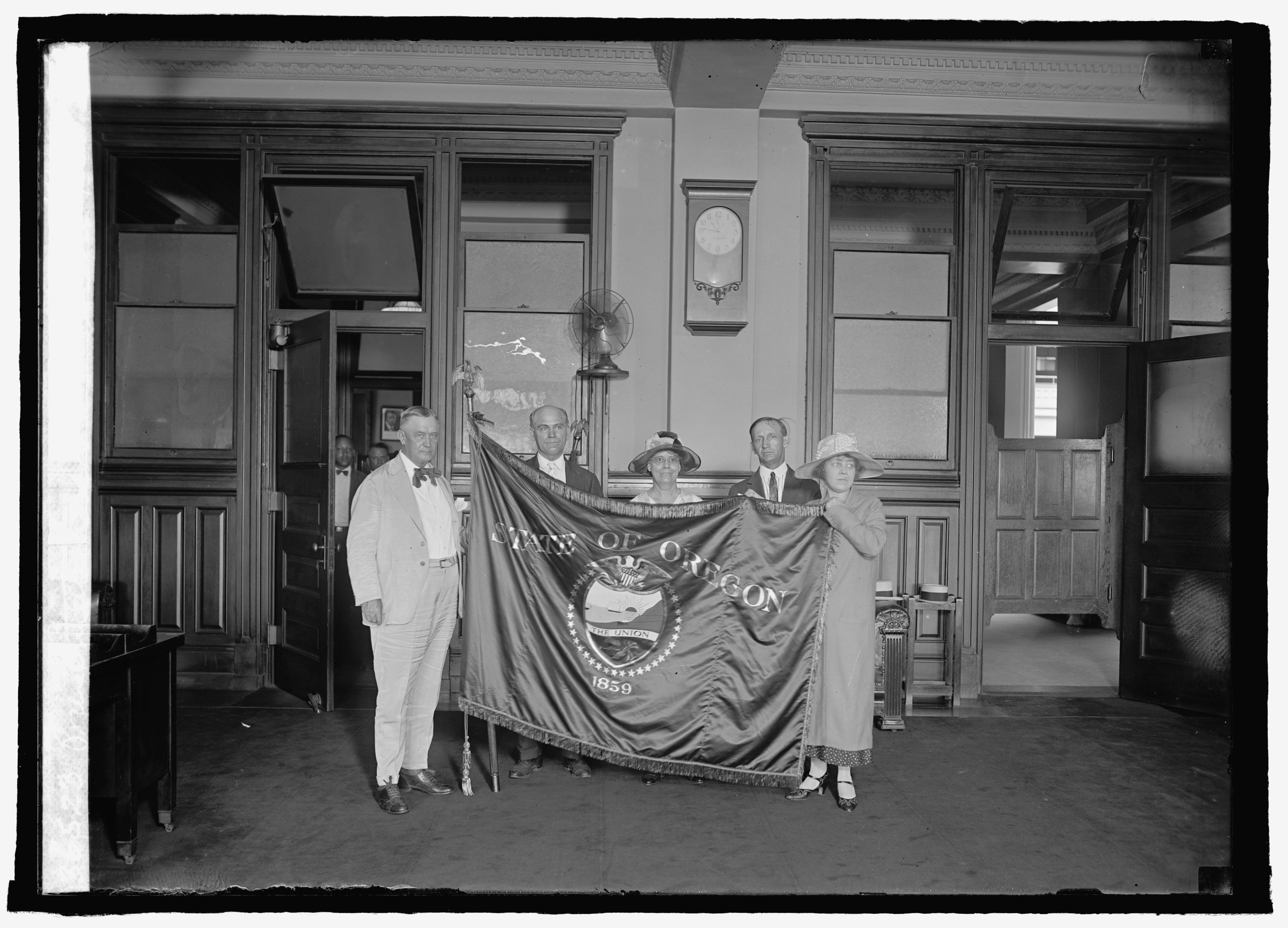
Presentation of the state flag at unknown event, July 7, 1925.

The current flag of Oregon was officially adopted on February 26, 1925. What is believed to be the first officially produced flag of Oregon was made that year by Meier & Frank, sewn by Marjorie Kennedy and Blanche Cox, employees of the department store. That flag was donated to Eastern Oregon University in 1954 by the grandson of former governor Walter M. Pierce. In 2010, the flag was restored.

Early copies of the Oregon state flag sometimes used a multi-colored state seal rather than an all-gold state seal.

In 1926, a veterans organization was given a unique state flag. This flag was the same as the normal state flag except it had the organization's name in place of the state name, and the backside depicted the United Spanish War Veterans seal instead of a beaver.

== Gallery ==
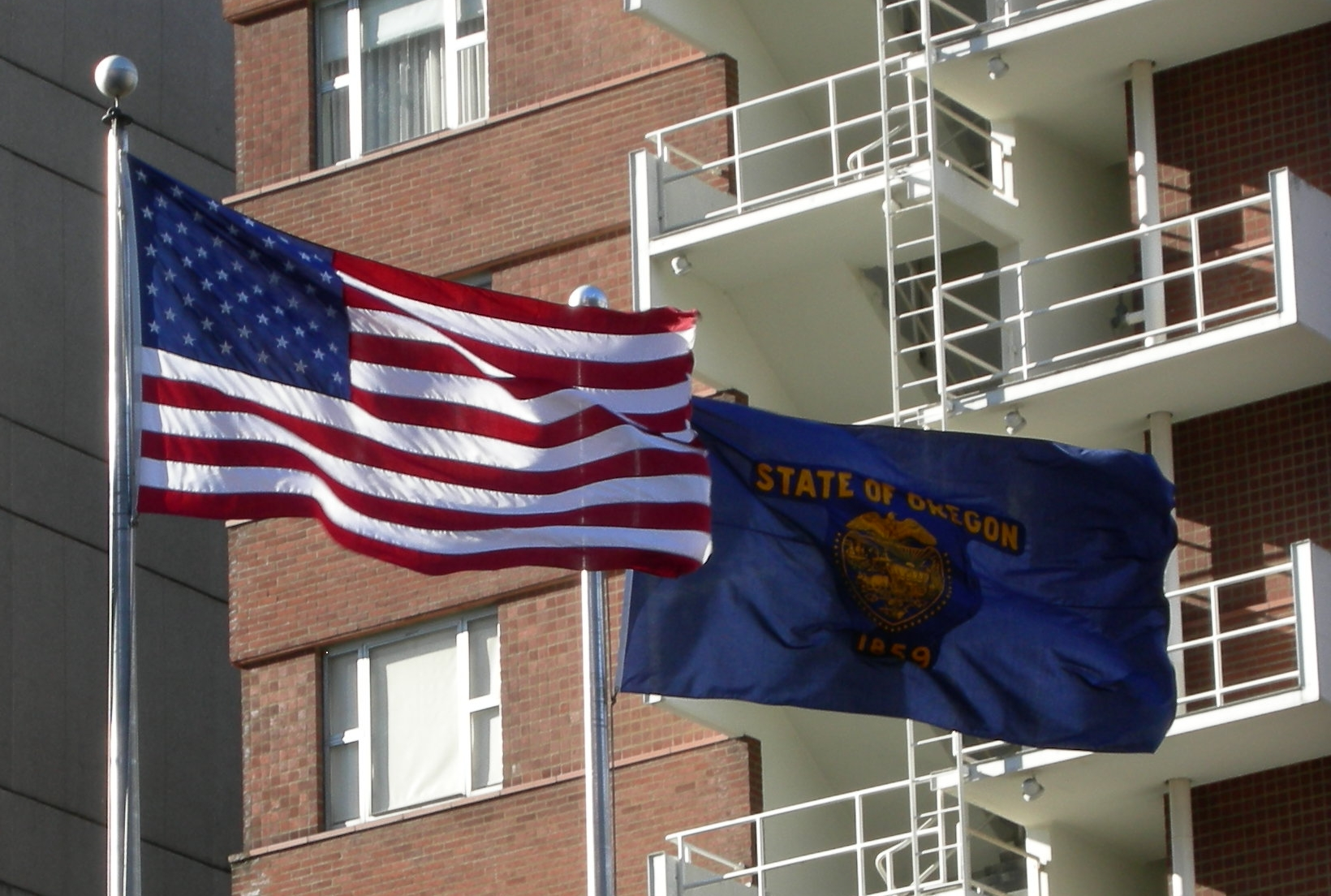
The flags of the United States and Oregon in Portland, Oregon

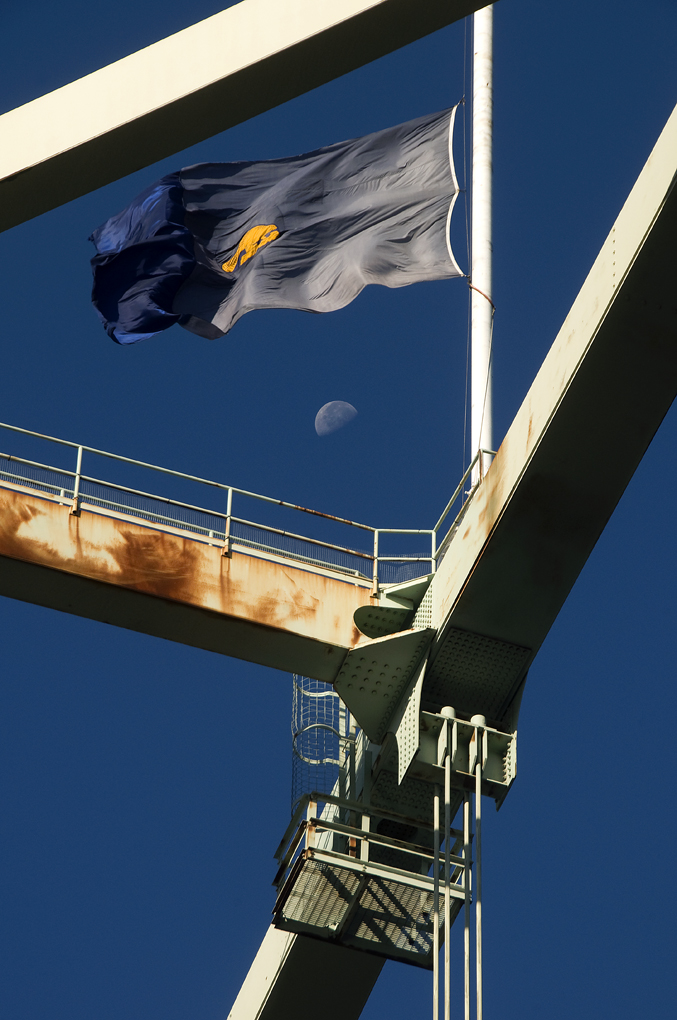
The Oregon flag flying above Fremont Bridge in Portland

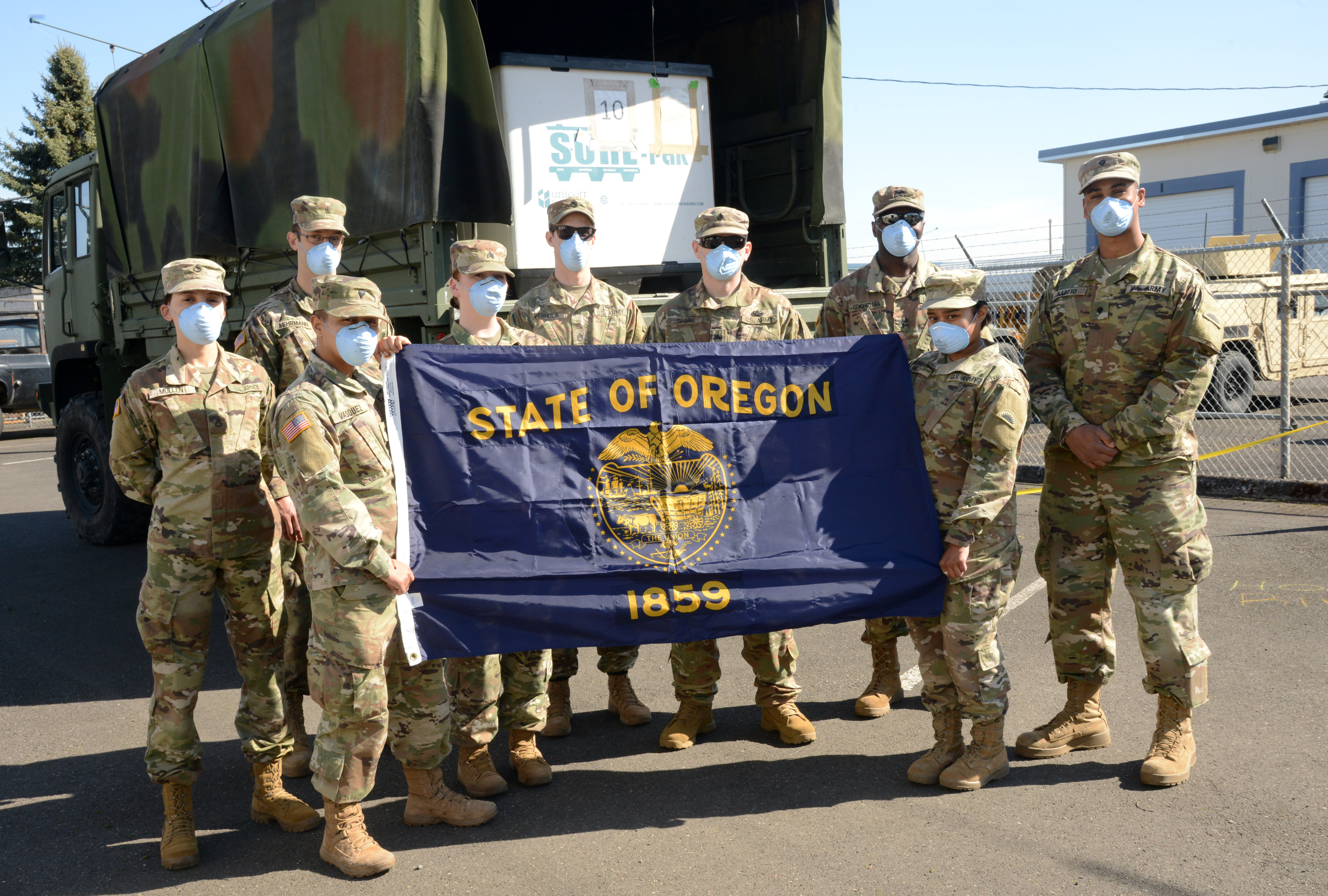
Oregon Guardsmen with the state flag

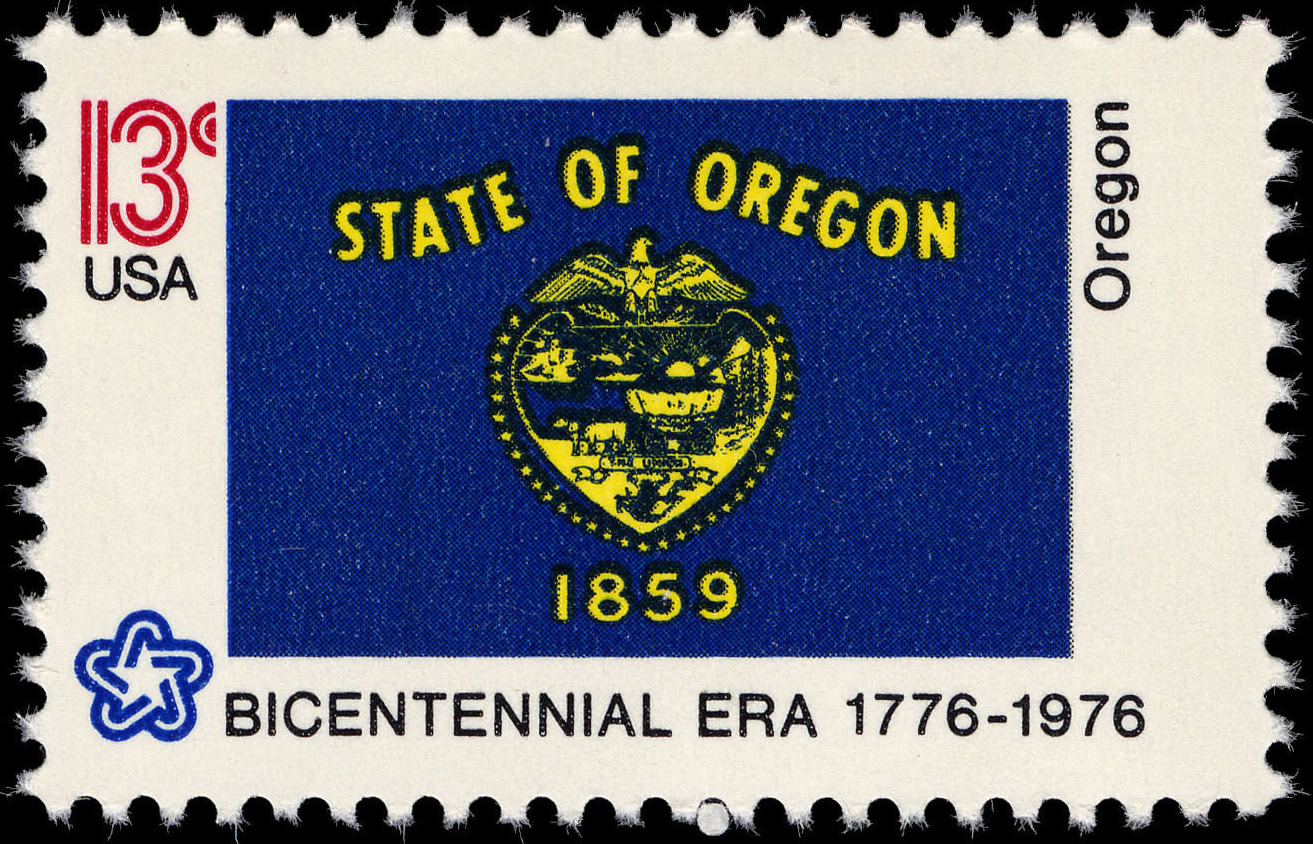
The Oregon state flag (obverse) as depicted in the 1976 bicentennial postage stamp series

== Proposed change ==
Jean-Claude Muller's proposed flag (1976)

As part of the United States Bicentennial in 1976, the Santa Barbara Museum of Art held a nationwide contest for new flags for American states, cities and other entities. A panel of judges selected 25 of the best designs to be displayed at various exhibitions around the United States. Among the selected designs was a proposed flag for Oregon, designed by Jean-Claude Muller. It consisted of a pattern of nine green triangles against a background of three vertical stripes of blue-white-blue, symbolising the forest, the ocean and the lakes of the state. Although it was hoped that the winning designs might be considered for adoption by their respective entities, no flags from this contest were ever officially adopted.

In anticipation of the Oregon Sesquicentennial in 2009, The Oregonian organized a statewide contest in 2008 to redesign the state flag. The newspaper collected and published the entries with the public voting on the winning design. The winning design was created by Randall Gray, a map maker for Clackamas County. In his design, Gray emphasized the beaver found on the current flag's reverse. The star represents Oregon's place in the Union while the green represents the natural wilderness and forests of Oregon. After the contest had started with votes being cast, there were requests for the Oregonian to add an 11th option, "NONE OF THE ABOVE", meaning, keep the current state flag as it is. In the final tally of votes, "NONE" received the most votes.

Finalists

Flag A – Designed by Gerald H. Black

Flag B – Designed by Eddy Lyons

Flag C – Designed by Douglas Lynch

Flag D – Designed by Jaymes Walker

Flag E – Designed by John Mothershead

Flag F – Designed by T.J. Borzner

Flag G – Designed by Randall Gray

Flag H – Designed by Lorraine Bushek

Flag I – Designed by Karen L. Azinger

Flag J – Designed by Thomas Lincoln

In 2013, a bill was introduced to the Oregon Senate that would have made several changes to the flag design; however, the bill never made it out of committee. This bill was sponsored by state Senator Laurie Monnes Anderson, on behalf of Gresham resident Matt Norquist, who lobbied for the flag's change.

Matt Norquist's proposed flag (2013)

The bill describes the proposed design as follows:

The flag shall feature a vertical bicolor split with a navy blue field at the hoist and a gold field at the fly. In the canton the flag shall bear a representation of the beaver, in gold, facing the hoist. On the fly the flag shall bear a vertical stripe in navy blue, and a white star shall be centered at the vertical halfway point of the stripe. The obverse and reverse of the flag shall be mirror images of each other.

== Militia flags ==
In 1839, Thomas J. Farnham, the leader of the Oregon Dragoons, had his wife make a flag for them. The flag was described as a large American flag with the motto "Oregon or the grave."

In 1888, Adjutant-General of the Oregon state guard ordered 3 regimental flags, with one of them having been given to Company F. The flags were described as "made of blue silk, with the seal of Oregon, in the center". They costed $250 ($8,459.61 today) each to make.

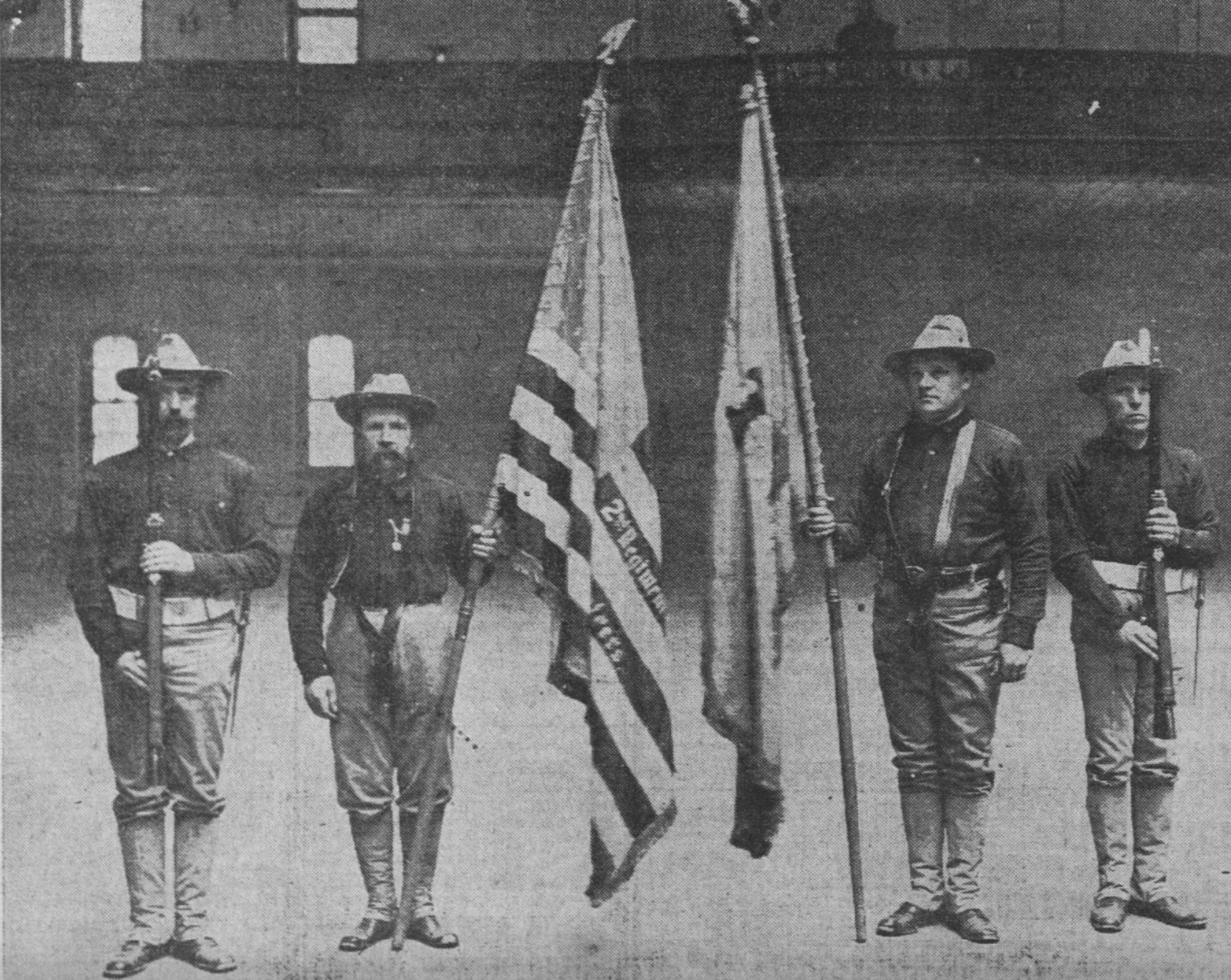
Regimental colors of the 2nd Oregon Infantry, used during the Spanish-American War

In 1895, 3 flags were given to the 2nd Oregon infantry regiment. One of them had a blue field with the coat of arms and the name of the regiment in the middle. The whole thing measured 6 x 6 feet.

In 1908, two flags were produced by order from the American Consul-General in Shanghai, China. The flags were to be sent to China for use by the Shanghai Volunteer Corps. One flag was the American flag, and the other was a regimental banner that was described as "5 1/2 feet by 4 1/2 feet... The arms of the state of Oregon are done in oil upon blue silk field.” According to the Morning Oregonian, this flag design was the same as the regimental flags used by the state Guard.

In January 1918, the University of Oregon had constructed a unique flag for their ROTC. It was described as "Yellow silk...10 feet by 4 feet, with an Oregon state seal appliquéd in the center. A border of Oregon grape... embroidered around the edge, and heavy gold fringe…” In 1929 the University ordered a new flag for the organization. The flag contained a blue field with the state's seal in the center with a gold scroll underneath. In the scroll was the inscription: "Reserve Officers Training Corps." The flag measured 5 feet by 4 feet.

Oregon Dragoons flag, 1839

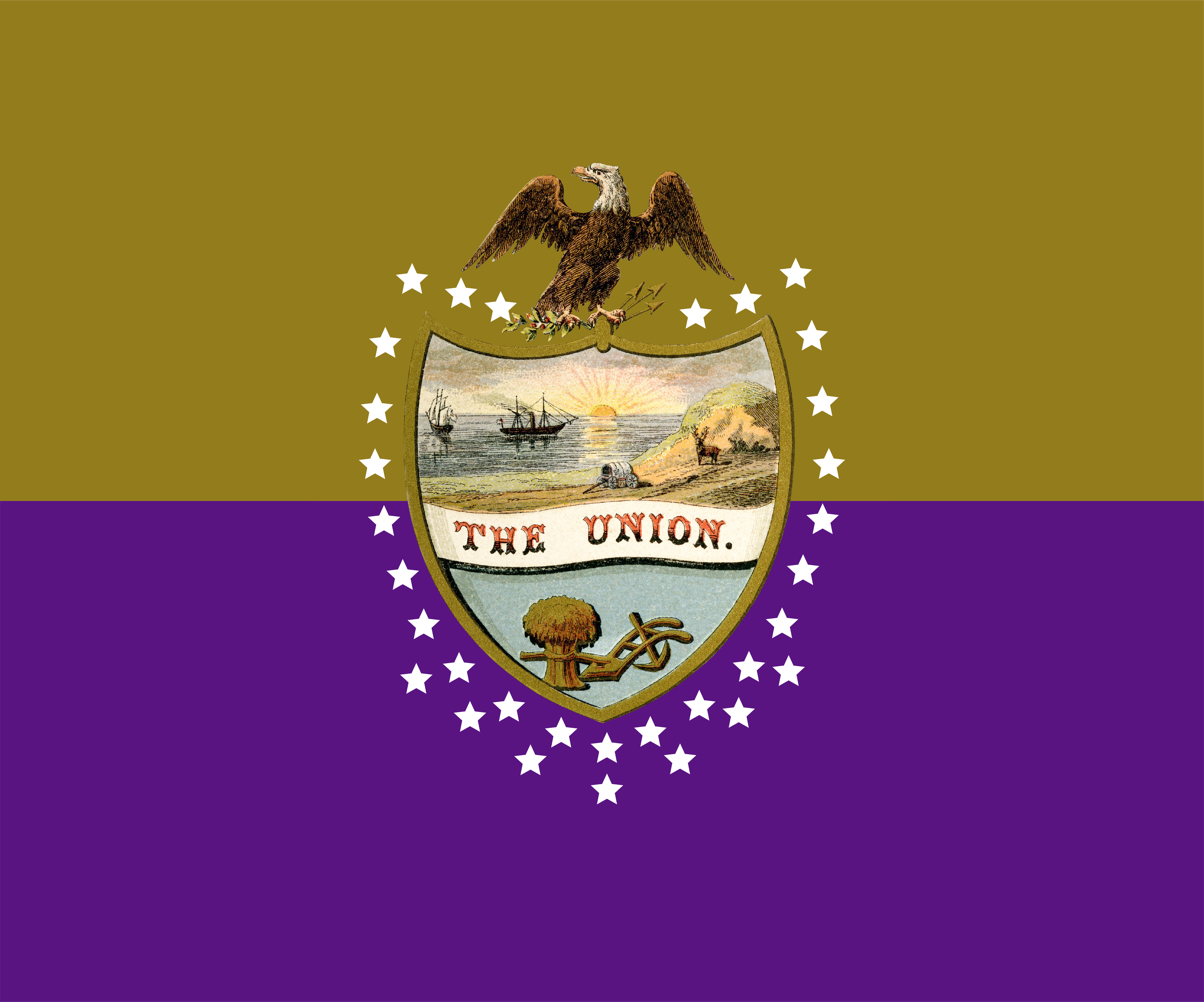
Digital reconstruction of the flag carried by the 3rd Oregon Infantry Regiment, 1916

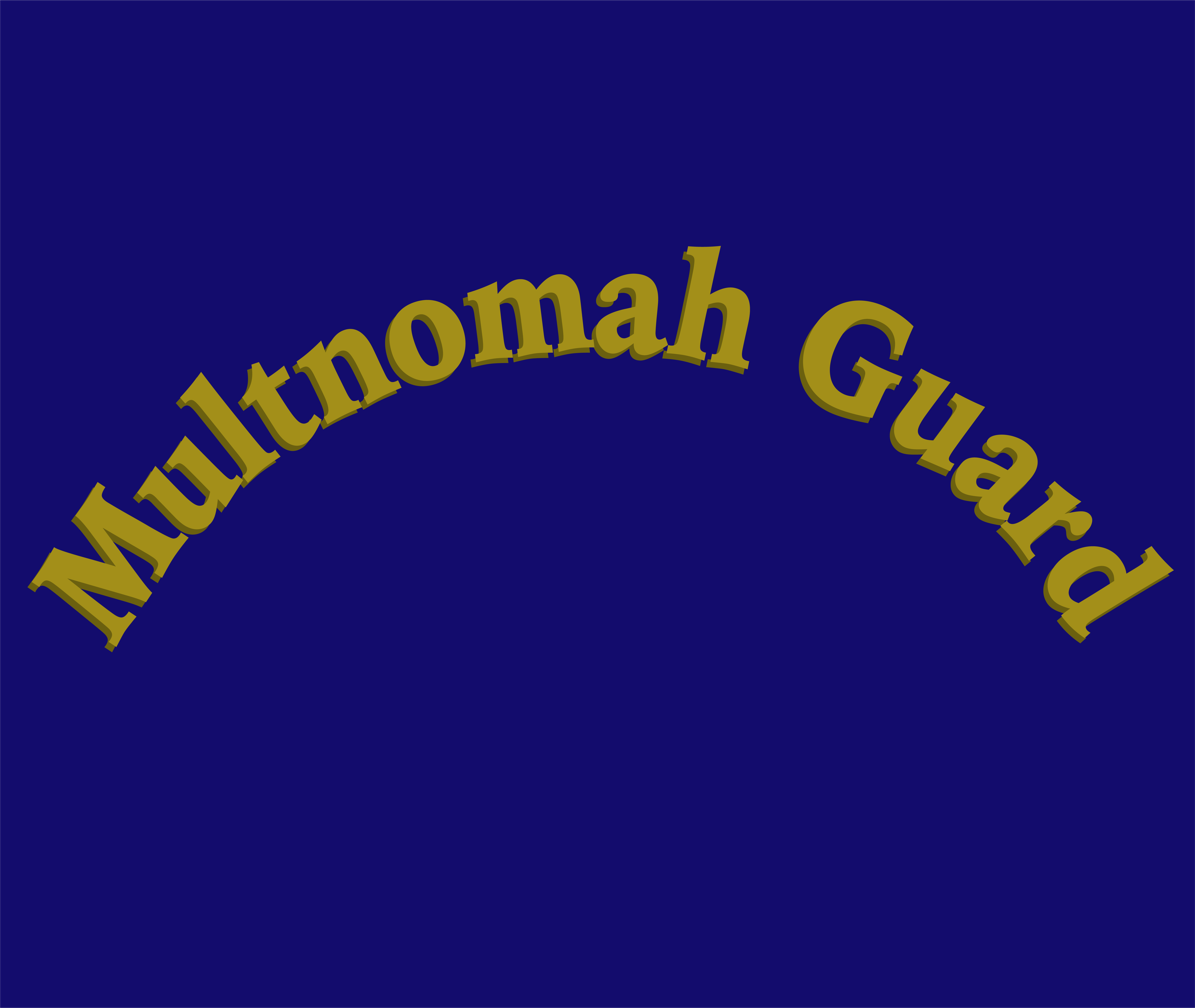
Digital reconstruction of Multnomah Guard Battalion flag, 1918

== See also ==
- Seal of Oregon
- List of Oregon state symbols
- Flags whose reverse differs from the obverse
