= List of U.S. state tourism slogans =

List of slogans used to encourage tourism to US states

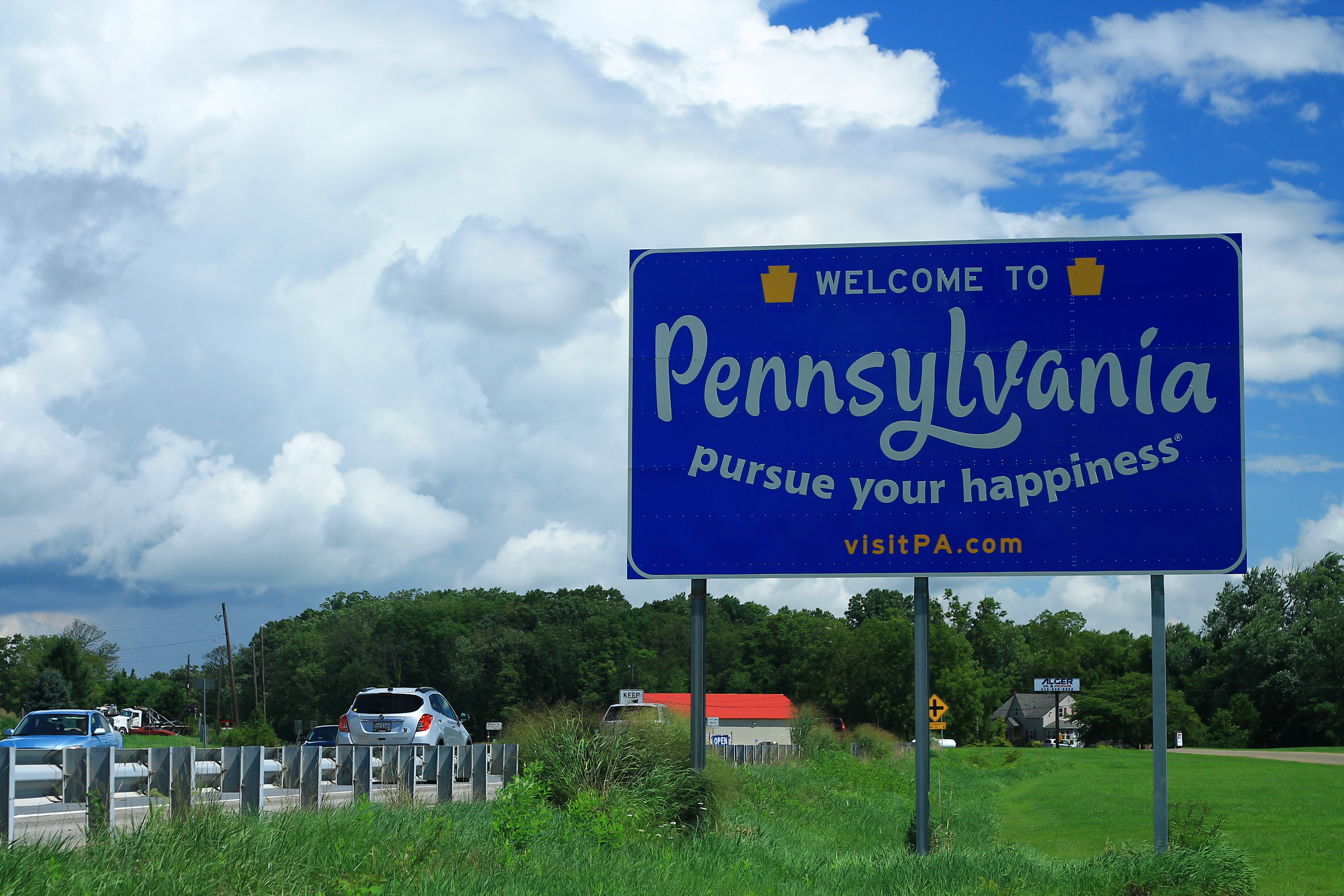
A welcome sign into Pennsylvania, bearing the slogan "Pursue Your Happiness"

This is a list of tourism slogans for each of the 50 states in the United States of America, as adopted by each state's departments for handling tourism.

== List ==
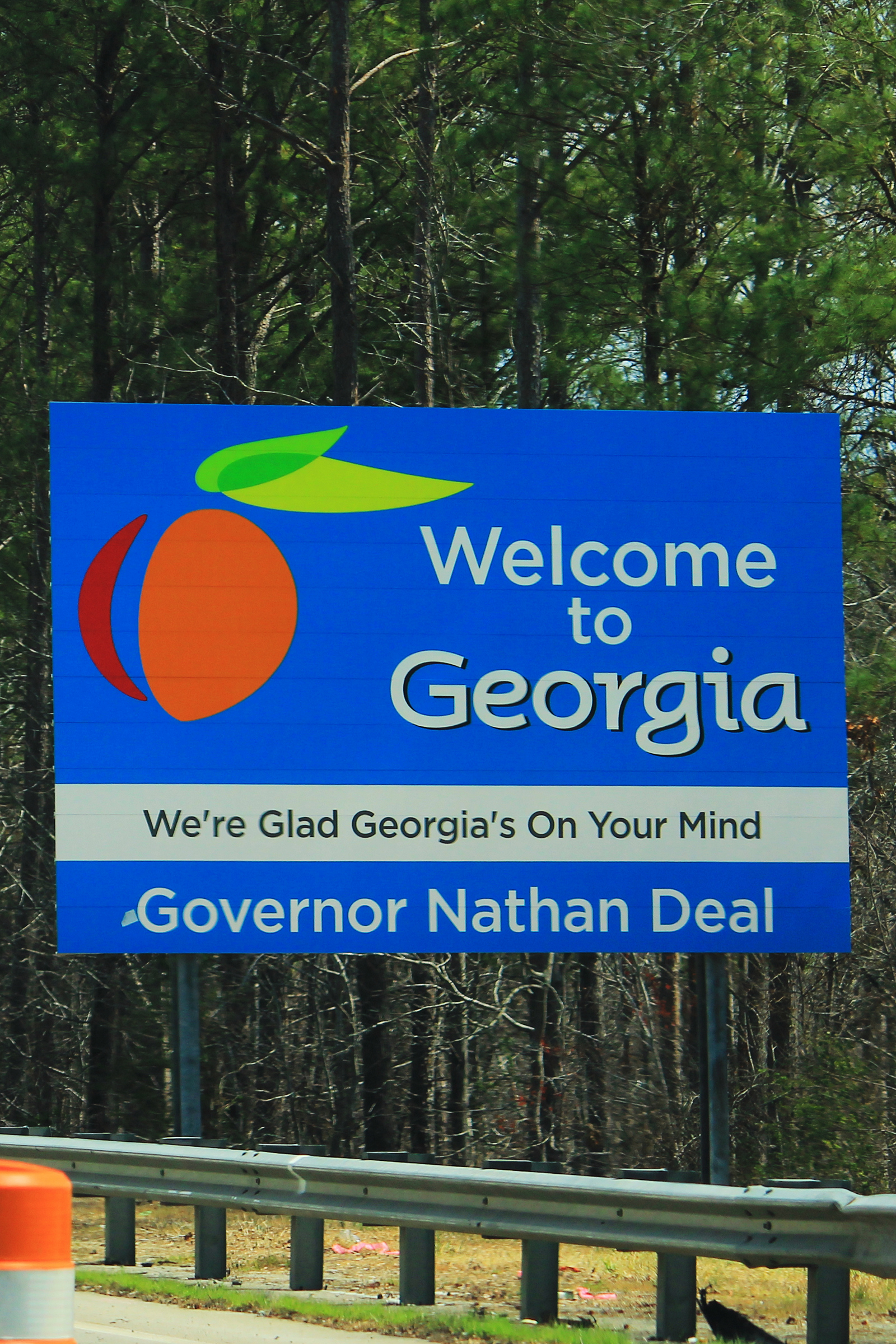
A sign welcoming travelers to Georgia, thanking visitors for having "Georgia on their mind"

State	Slogan	Other or previous slogans	Ref
Alabama	Sweet Home Alabama	Share the Wonder	
Alaska	Find your Alaska	Beyond Your Dreams, Within Your Reach	
Arizona	Vibrant Arizona		
California	Dream Big		
Colorado	Come to Life		
Connecticut	Make it Here	Still Revolutionary Full of Surprises	
Delaware	Endless Discoveries	It's good being first	
Florida		Your Florida Side is Calling Must Be the Sunshine The Rules are Different Here	
(Georgia (U.S. state)) Georgia	Georgia on My Mind	Put Your Dreams in Motion Ready Set Georgia	
Hawaii	The Islands of Aloha		
Idaho	Famous Potatoes	Great Potatoes. Tasty Destinations	
Illinois	Middle of Everything	Are You Up for Adventure? Mile after Magnificent Mile	
Indiana	IN Indiana	Honest to Goodness Indiana	
Iowa	Freedom to Flourish	Fields of Opportunity	
Kansas	To the stars	There's No Place Like Kansas As big as you think	
Kentucky	Unbridled Spirit		
Louisiana	Feed Your Soul	Pick Your Passion	
Maine	Welcome Home	Discover Your Maine Thing The Way Life Should Be There's more to Maine	
Maryland	You're Welcome		
Massachusetts	It's All Here		
Michigan	Pure Michigan	Say Yes to Michigan Great Lakes. Great Times.	
Minnesota	Explore Minnesota	Land of 10,000 Lakes	
Mississippi	Feels Like Coming Home		
Montana	The Sky's the Limit	Big Sky Country Montana - Naturally Inviting	
Nebraska	Nebraska. All Heart.	The good life.	
Nevada	A World Within. A State Apart.		
New Hampshire	Live Free		
New Mexico	New Mexico True		
(New York (state)) New York	I Love New York		
North Dakota	Start Your Journey to Legendary		
Ohio	The Heart of it all	So Much to Discover! Find it here	
Oklahoma	Imagine that	Oklahoma is OK Native America	
Oregon	We Like It Here. You Might Too.	Stay Weird	
Pennsylvania	Pursue your Happiness	The State of Independence	
Rhode Island	Fun-Sized	The Ocean State Unwind	
South Carolina	Made for Vacation	Smiling Faces. Beautiful Places.	
South Dakota	My Great Place	Your American Journey Great Faces, Great Places	
Tennessee	Sounds Good to Me		
Texas	Let’s Texas		
Utah	Life Elevated	Greatest Snow on Earth	
Vermont	Vermont, Naturally		
Virginia	Virginia is for Lovers		
(Washington (state)) Washington	Washington: The State	SayWA?	
West Virginia	Wild and Wonderful	Almost Heaven	
Wisconsin	Discover the Unexpected	You're Among Friends	
Wyoming	That's Wyoming	True West	
