= Frank Fletcher (footballer) =

English footballer

Personal information
- Full name: Frank Fletcher
- Date of birth: 1874
- Place of birth: Caversham, England
- Date of death: 1936 (aged 61–62)
- Position: Winger

Senior career*
Years	Team	Apps	(Gls)
1890–1891	Shiplake United		
1891–1895	Reading		
1895–1896	West Bromwich Albion	1	(0)
1896–1897	Grimsby Town		
Total		1	(0)
- * Club domestic league appearances and goals

Frank Fletcher (1874–1936) was an English footballer who played in the Football League for West Bromwich Albion. His only appearance for West Brom was in a 1–0 win against Stoke on 9 November 1895.
