= Peoria Party =

Pioneers from Peoria, Illinois; early travellers of the Oregon Trail

The Peoria Party (/piˈɔːriə/ pee-OR-ee-ə) was a group of men from Peoria in the U.S. state of Illinois, who set out about May 1, 1839, with the intention to colonize the Oregon Country on behalf of the United States and to drive out the English fur-trading companies operating there. The men of the Peoria Party were among the early pioneers who used the Oregon Trail.

Oregon Dragoons flag, 1839

== Overview ==
The fall before the Peoria Party began the long journey to Oregon, Rev. Jason Lee had visited Peoria on a national speaking tour about the Oregon country and moving westward. He recruited sixteen men at the start, but would pick up three more volunteers on the trail - bringing their largest number to nineteen. They organized themselves in military fashion, adopting the name "Oregon Dragoons" and elected Thomas J. Farnham as their captain. They carried with them a large flag, a gift from Mrs. Farnham, emblazoned with their motto, "Oregon or the grave."

The expedition ran into many obstacles and hardships. Rain fell continuously and the going was very rough over unforgiving land. Food rationing became necessary and each man was limited to a daily food allotment of one-quarter cup of flour, mixed with water, and fried in bacon fat. Some members of the group quit and headed back to Peoria. The men began to argue and bicker over leadership, which culminated in a near fatal accident a month later causing the eventual dissolution of the Peoria Party. Sidney Smith, a member of the party, was also accidentally shot and severely wounded during another heated argument.

On July 5, 1839, the remaining members of the Peoria Party reached Bent's Fort, a trading post on the South Fork of the Platte River. Farnham was deposed as leader and the group split up officially. Nine of the original nineteen eventually made it to Oregon - the rest of the group either returned to Peoria or headed in other directions.

== Members of the Oregon Dragoons ==
- Thomas Jefferson Farnham, age 35. A Peoria lawyer who organized and was elected captain of the Peoria Party. He was deposed as leader during the trip and arrived in Oregon in the fall of 1839. He stayed only a few weeks and returned to the United States with a petition signed by sixty Oregonians asking the U.S. Government to take possession of the territory. His account of the adventure, Travels in the Great Western Prairies, was published in both the U.S. and Britain and did much to create interest in immigration to Oregon. Farnham was born in Vermont in 1804 and died in San Francisco September 13, 1848.
- Amos Cook, age 23. After the group dissolved he wintered at Brown's Hole with his friends and companions Francis Fletcher, Joseph Holman, and Ralph Kilbourne all of whom completed the journey together. They arrived at Fort Vancouver on June 1, 1840, thirteen months after leaving Peoria. Cook took a Donation Land Claim in Yamhill County and voted to form a provisional government at Champoeg on May 2, 1843. Cook was born January 8, 1816, in Maine. He was the last surviving member of the Peoria Party when he died at his home near Dayton, Oregon, on February 3, 1895.
- Francis Fletcher, age 25. He arrived at Fort Vancouver accompanied by Amos Cook, Joseph Holman, and Ralph Kilbourne. He took a Donation Land Claim in Yamhill County next to his lifelong friend Amos Cook. He voted for the Provisional Government at Champoeg and was an original trustee of Willamette University. Fletcher was born in Yorkshire, England, on March 1, 1814, and died at his home near Dayton on October 7, 1871.
- Joseph Holman, age 24. He was a cooper by trade and made saddles and gunstocks while wintering at Brown's Hole, which he traded for a horse and supplies. His constant companions on the journey were Amos Cook, Francis Fletcher, and Ralph Kilbourne. Holman settled in Marion County and voted for the Provisional Government at Champoeg. He was an original trustee of Willamette University. Holman was born August 20, 1815, in Devonshire, England, and died at his home near Salem, Oregon, on June 25, 1880. His son, George Phelps Holman, was the first white child born in Salem.
- Ralph L. Kilbourne, age 29. He was a Peoria restaurant keeper who made the entire journey with Amos Cook, Francis Fletcher, and Joseph Holman. In Oregon he helped build the clipper ship Star of Oregon with which he sailed to California in 1841 and settled. Kilbourne was born in Pennsylvania in June 1810 and died in Rutherford, California September 25, 1879.
- Robert Shortess, age 42. A former schoolteacher who joined the Peoria Party in Independence, Missouri. He replaced Farnham as captain but chose to go it alone rather than spend the winter at Brown's Hole with his remaining men. He arrived in Oregon in 1840 and became radically anti-British. He voted for the Provisional Government at Champoeg. He finally settled in Clatsop County where he was elected judge and held several other political posts. Born in Pennsylvania in 1797, Shortess died at his home in Astoria, Oregon May 4, 1878.
- Sidney Smith, age 30. Although Smith was severely wounded by an accidental gunshot, he was the first member of the Peoria Party to make it to Oregon, arriving on September 3, 1839. He became a wealthy rancher and made $3,000 in the California gold fields. He voted for the Provisional Government at Champoeg. Smith was born in Amsterdam, New York, on October 2, 1809. He died on September 18, 1880, at his home in Lafayette, Oregon.
- Robert Moore, age 58. He was the oldest member of the group and was a veteran of the War of 1812, where he served as a major in the Pennsylvania militia. He spent the winter at Fort Saint Vrain and came through to Oregon in 1840. Moore voted for the Provisional Government at Champoeg. Born October 2, 1781, he settled near Oregon City where he died September 2, 1857.
- William Blair, age about 50. Joined the party at the Arkansas River and chose to stay with Farnham when Farnham was expelled from the group. Born in Kentucky, Blair made it through to Oregon in 1839 but later moved to California.
- Chauncey Wood. Originally from New York, he was elected lieutenant of the Oregon Dragoons in Independence. He left the party at Bent's Fort after it was split between Farnham and Shortess. He headed for New Mexico accompanied by John Pritchel.
- John Pritchel, age about 35. A tailor originally from England, Pritchel headed for New Mexico with Chauncey Wood.
- Obadiah A. Oakley, age 32. He was voted out of the group along with Farnham and Smith. He joined Paul Richardson's company of trappers and traders at Brown's Hole. Oakley was born June 15, 1807, in New York and died May 31, 1850, in California.
- Joseph Wood. A native of England, Wood also joined Richardson's company at Brown's Hole.
- Quinn Jordan. Also an Englishman by birth, he too joined Richardson's company.
- Charles Yates, age about 30. Another Englishman, he quit the group at Fort St. Vrain and headed for New Mexico.
- James Trask, age about 25. Originally from New York, Trask quit and returned to Peoria.
- Owen Garrett. Quit less than a month into the trip and returned to Peoria.
- Thomas Pickett. Quit less than a month into the trip and returned to Peoria.
- John Moore. Quit less than a month into the trip and returned to Peoria. He was one of seven English-born members of the Oregon Dragoons.

== See also ==
- Lewis and Clark Expedition
- Astor Expedition
