= Brookside Cemetery (Dayton, Oregon) =

Historic cemetery in Yamhill County, Oregon, US

- U.S. National Register of Historic Places
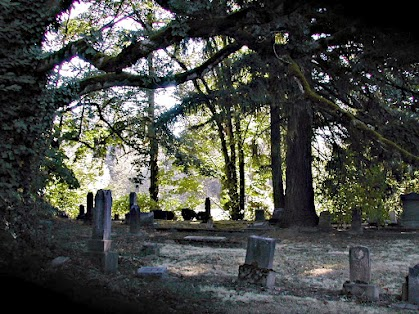
- The cemetery in 2012

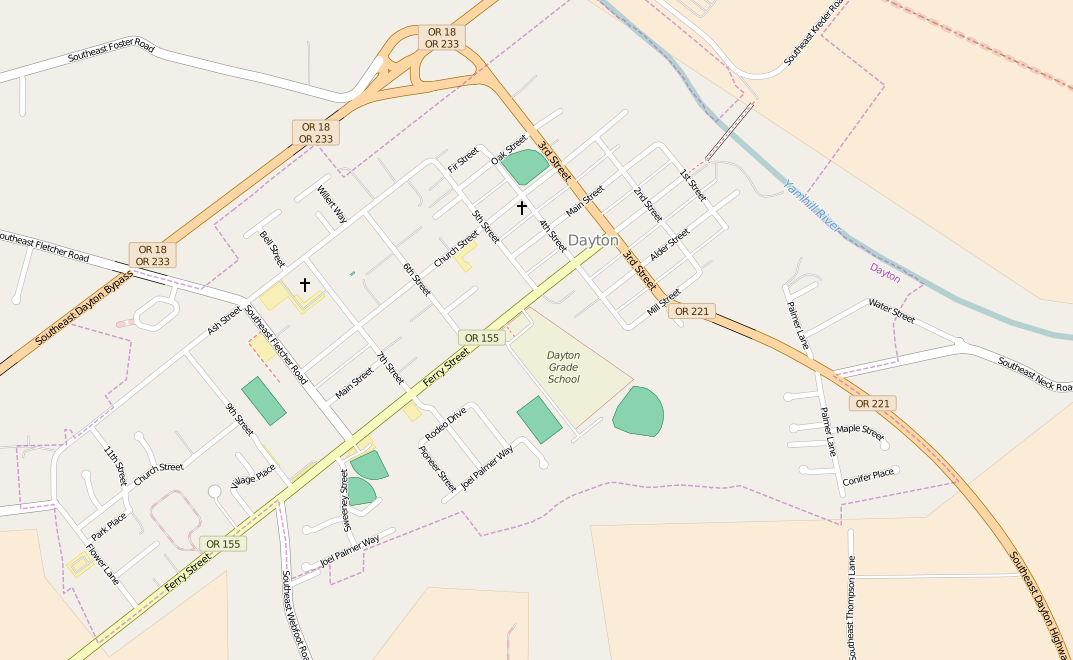
- Location within Dayton OR
- Coordinates: 45°13′06″N 123°04′24″W
- MPS: Brookside Cemetery
- NRHP reference No.: 87000332

Brookside Cemetery is an historic 3.41-acre cemetery in Dayton, Oregon, United States. Joel Palmer set aside land for the cemetery in the 1850s; he deeded the site to the Dayton School District in 1874. 479 people are known to have been buried there between July 1864 and June 1987; there are presently no vacant plots. The cemetery is listed on the National Register of Historic Places.

== See also ==
- National Register of Historic Places listings in Yamhill County, Oregon
