= Thomas J. Farnham =

American explorer and author

Thomas Jefferson Farnham
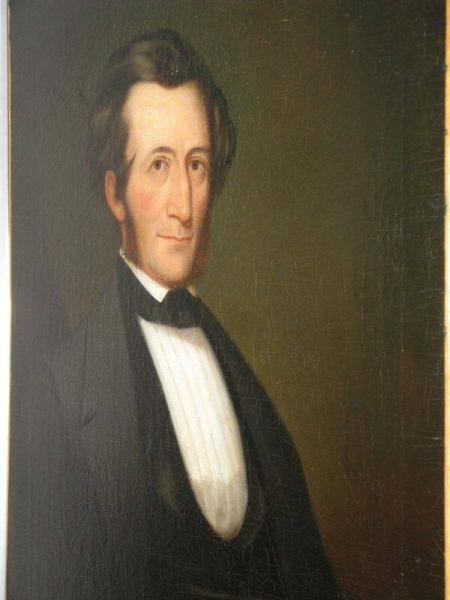
- Born: 1804; Vermont or Maine
- Died: September 13, 1848 (aged 43–44); San Francisco, California
- Occupations: Explorer, writer
- Writing career
- Period: Mid-19th century
- Genre: American West

Thomas Jefferson Farnham (1804–1848) was an explorer and author of the American West in the first half of the 19th century. His travels included interaction with missionary Jason Lee, and he later led a wagon train on the Oregon Trail. While in Oregon Country he wrote a petition to federal authorities that requested federal protection of the region from the United States government, which was signed by many of the local settlers who had come from the United States.

== Early/Middle life ==
In 1804 Thomas Farnham was born in New England, in either Vermont or what later became the state of Maine. He then received an education at Phillips Academy, Andover and moved to Peoria, Illinois, where he became a lawyer. Farnham was married in 1836 to Eliza Woodson Burhams, and they had three children. In 1839 he heard a lecture by Jason Lee on Oregon where Lee had set up a mission to preach to the Native Americans in the Willamette Valley. At the time Lee was recruiting more people for the mission. After this lecture Farnham joined the Peoria Party that was headed for Oregon and became the captain of the group of 19. The Peoria men called themselves the Oregon Dragoons and carried with them a flag, a gift from Mrs. Farnham, emblazoned with their motto "OREGON or the GRAVE".

== Travels ==
Captain Farnham and the Oregon Dragoons traveled the Oregon Trail and arrived at Fort Vancouver along the Columbia River with only five people of the 19 that began the journey. The other members of the party deserted the group along the way. Farnham wrote a petition for the American settlers while in the region. This document was signed by many of the U.S. pioneers, and called on the federal government to extend its jurisdiction over the area in order to protect Americans and their interests. At the time, the region was uncontrolled by any country, though both the British and Americans had economic interests and citizens in the region.

Thomas Farnham then left the settlements of the Willamette Valley and sailed for the Sandwich Islands. Returning to the mainland, he landed at Monterey, capital of Alta California. While there, Farnham helped to secure the release (in 1841) of a group of Americans, British and Californios, arrested in Alta California in 1840 and sent by ship to San Blas, then overland to a prison in Tepic. Governor Juan Alvarado, assisted by military commander Mariano Guadalupe Vallejo, accused the men, involved in what became known as the Graham Affair, of plotting a revolt against the Mexican government.

During the Graham Affair, Farnham traveled to San Blas, arriving on May 16, 1840, then went on to Tepic to meet with the prisoners. Following the prisoners' release, Farnham continued across Mexico to New Orleans. In 1841, he moved on to New York City, then to Wisconsin for a brief time. Farnham later moved to Alton, Illinois, before moving back to California in 1846. He died in San Francisco, California on September 13, 1848. Farnham's widow Eliza moved to Santa Cruz, California and went on to become a leading abolitionist, novelist and early feminist.

== Works ==
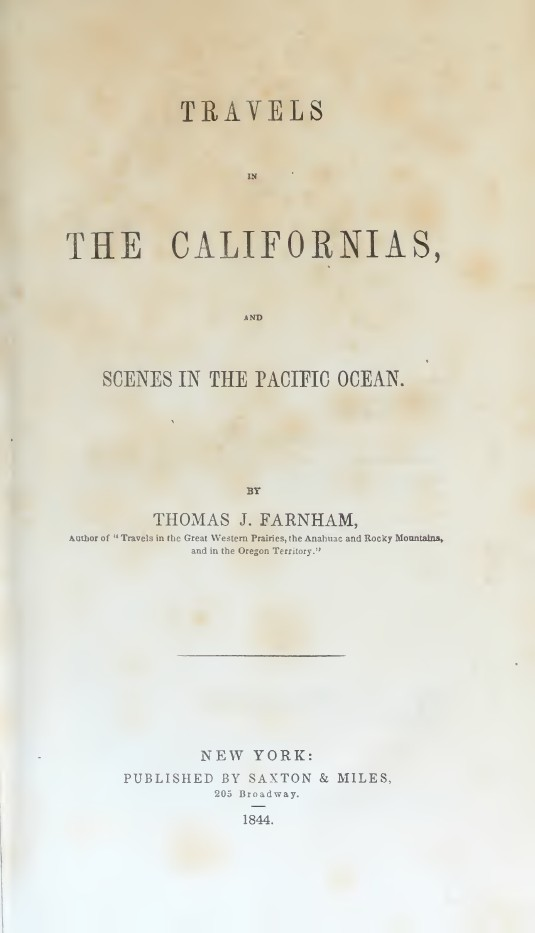
Travels in the Californias and Scenes in the Pacific (1844)

- Travels in Oregon Territory (1842)
- Travels in the Great Western Prairies (1843)
- Travels in the Californias and Scenes in the Pacific (1844)
- A Memoir of the Northwest Boundary-Line (1845)
- Mexico, its Geography, People, and Institutions (1846)
