= Seal of Oregon =

Official government emblem of the U.S. state of Oregon

Great Seal of the State of Oregon
- Armiger: State of Oregon
- Adopted: February 14, 1859
- Motto: "The Union" established in 1957 "She Flies With Her Own Wings" established in 1987

The seal of the State of Oregon is the official seal of the U.S. state of Oregon. It was designed by Harvey Gordon in 1857, two years before Oregon was admitted to the Union. The seal was preceded by the Salmon Seal of the Provisional Government and the Seal of the Oregon Territory. The state seal is mandated by Article VI of the Oregon Constitution.

== History ==
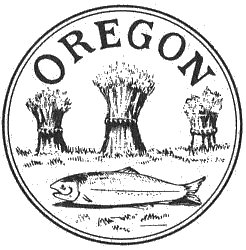
Salmon seal

Territorial seal

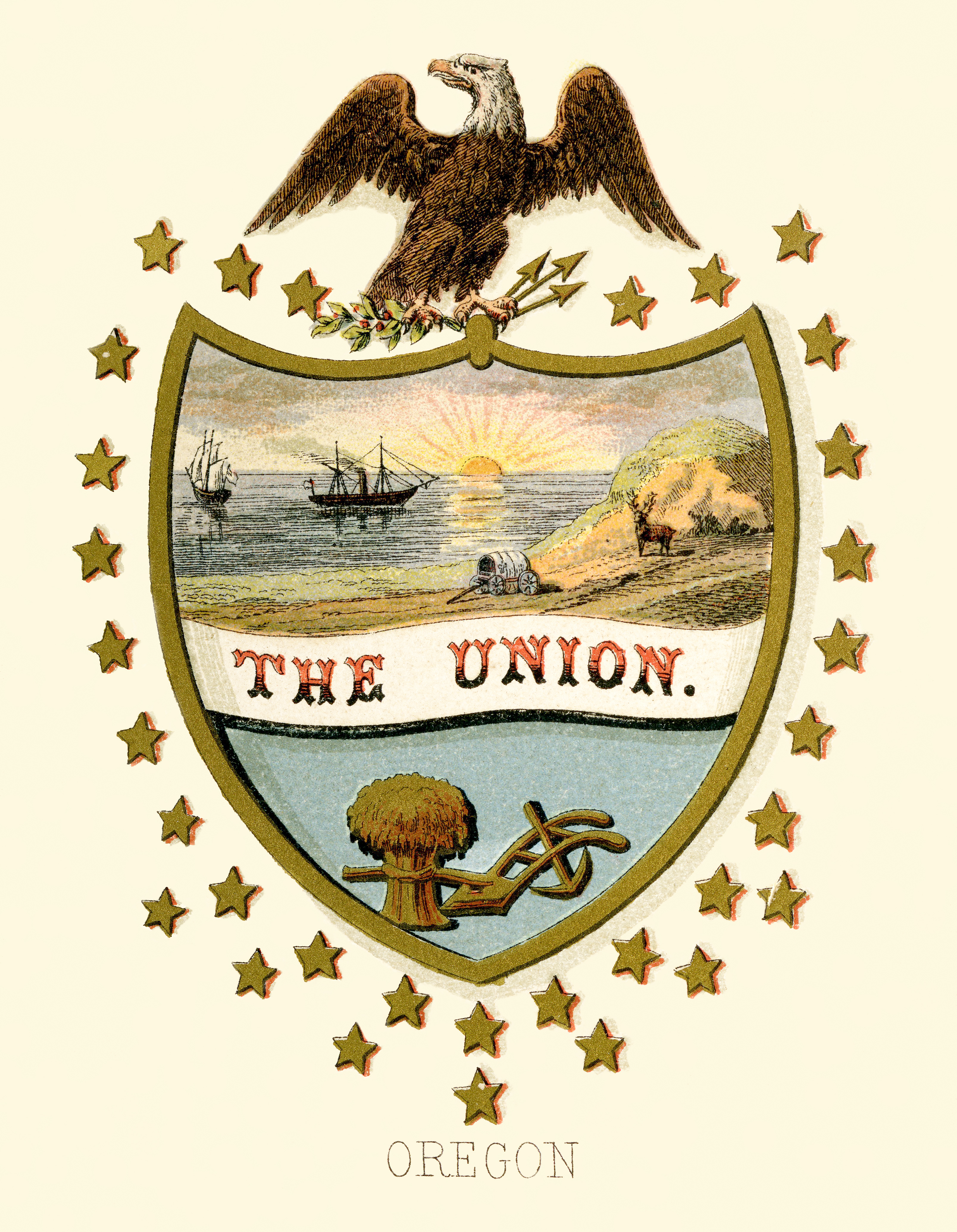
Oregon state historical coat of arms (illustrated, 1876)

The first seal for Oregon was during the Provisional Government that ran from 1843 to 1849. That government used the Salmon Seal, a round seal featuring three sheaves of grain and a single salmon. The salmon was at the bottom, with Oregon along the top. The salmon was designed to symbolize the fishing industry and the grain to represent agriculture. Designed to be neutral concerning the Oregon Question and whether the U.S. or Britain would ultimately control the region, the seal was used until the Oregon Territory was created and the territorial government arrived in 1849.

With the arrival of Governor Joseph Lane in 1849 the territorial government took control of the region. That year the government adopted a new seal featuring a motto and a variety of motifs. In the center was a sailing vessel used to represent commerce, and above that was a beaver to symbolize the fur trade that was prominent in Oregon's early recorded history. On the left of the ship was a Native American and on the right an eagle. Above the beaver on a banner was the Latin motto, Alis Volat Propriis, translated as "She flies with her own wings". Around the perimeter were five stars at the bottom and the words "Seal of the Territory of Oregon" along the top and sides.

In 1857, the Oregon Constitutional Convention was held in the capital of Salem where the delegates drafted a constitution to prepare for statehood and adopted a new seal to be used once statehood was achieved. The convention appointed Benjamin F. Burch, LaFayette Grover, and James K. Kelly to design a new seal. A proposal for a seal from Harvey Gordon was used with the addition of an elk added by the committee. Usage began after Oregon became the 33rd state on February 14, 1859, and the number of stars was increased to 33 from the original 32 by the Oregon Legislative Assembly (Minnesota became a state in 1858).

== Design ==
Flag of Oregon (obverse)

Whereas the existence of an Oregon state seal is written into Oregon's state constitution, the design of the seal itself is dictated by Oregon Revised Statute (ORS) chapter 186. The statutes list two laws pertaining to design and usage of the seal.

According to ORS 186.020, the seal consists of an outer ring with the text "State of Oregon", "1859". The inner circle contains an American eagle atop a shield. The shield depicts mountains, an elk, a covered wagon, and the Pacific Ocean. In the ocean, a British man-of-war is departing and an American steamer is arriving, symbolizing the end of British rule in the Oregon Country. The elk represents the plentiful game found in the state. The second quartering shows a sheaf, a plow, and a pickaxe. These symbolize mining and husbandry. The banner is inscribed "The Union". Thirty-three stars surrounding the shield represent the number of states upon Oregon's entry into the union in 1859.

The seal appears on the obverse of the state flag of Oregon.
