= Paolo Emilio Ricci =

Italian mathematician (born 1944)

Paolo Emilio Ricci Professor
- Born: 4 February 1944 (age 82); Arquata Scrivia, Italy
- Education: Sapienza University of Rome
- Awards: Doctor Honoris Causa and honorary professor of the I. Vekua Institute of Applied Mathematics (2003).; Prize of the Simon Stevin Institute for Geometry, Zandvoort (2015).; Life-Long achievement award of Vijnana Parishad of India (Society for Applications of Mathematics) (2016).; Golden Jubilee Award of Vijnana Parishad of India (Society for Applications of Mathematics) (2022).
- Scientific career
- Fields: Mathematical physics; Orthogonal polynomials; Special functions; Numerical analysis; Approximation theory; Mathematical analysis; Theory of elliptic partial differential equations
- Workplaces: University of Catania; Sapienza University of Rome; Università telematica internazionale Uninettuno
- Doctoral advisor: Gaetano Fichera

Paolo Emilio Ricci (4 February 1944) is an Italian mathematician, working on mathematical physics, orthogonal polynomials, special functions, numerical analysis, approximation theory and other related subjects mathematical analysis, theory of elliptic partial differential equations and special functions: he is also known for his work collaboration with Johan Gielis.

== Education and academic career ==
Paolo Emilio Ricci received his Laurea degree (cum laude) on 7 July 1967, at the Sapienza University of Rome: his thesis supervisor was Gaetano Fichera.

After his graduation he was appointed assistant professor to the chair of Mathematical Analysis II again at the Sapienza University of Rome for the 1967-1968 academic year. From 1969 to 1980 he worked as an assistant to the same chair, except for the years 1970-71 when he did his military service as a second lieutenant in the Italian Corps of Military Engineers.

In 1979 he won the ministerial competition for a chair of numerical analysis and become associate professor: as a consequence of his election, from November 1, 1980, to October 31, 1981, he worked as an ordinary professor of numerical analysis at the University of Catania.

From November 1, 1981, to November 1, 1990, he held the chair of Mathematical Analysis I at the Faculty of Engineering of the Sapienza University of Rome, first as an assistant professor and after the 1983 as an ordinary professor. From 1990 to the year of his retirement (2009) he held the chair of numerical analysis at the Faculty of Natural, Physical and Mathematical Sciences of the Sapienza University of Rome: after his retirement he accepted professor position in the Università telematica internazionale Uninettuno, ad this is currently his work.

He has also been director of the Rendiconti di Matematica in 1983 and for three years from 1984 to 1986 and then for six years, from 1987 to 1989 and from 1990 to 1992, jointly with Pietro Benvenuti.

== Honors ==
On 10 September 2003, he was awarded Doctor Honoris Causa by the I. Vekua Institute of Applied Mathematics of the Ivane Javakhishvili Tbilisi State University.

On May 24-28, 2009, on the occasion of his retirement, the conference "Advanced Special Functions and Solutions of PDEs" in honor of Paolo Emilio Ricci was held in Sabaudia.

In 2015, during the workshop "Modeling in Mathematics", for his contributions to geometry and mathematics, he was awarded the second Simon Stevin Prize for Geometry.

In 2017, he received the "Life-long achievement award of Vijnana Parishad" of India, followed in 2022 by "Golden Jubilee Award of Vijnana Parishad of India". on the occasion of the 5th International Conference on Recent Advances in Mathematical Sciences with Applications in Engineering and Technology.

On 23–24 May 2024, a conference in honor of Paolo Emilio Ricci on his 80th Birthday was held in Rome at the Istituto per le Applicazioni del Calcolo "Mauro Picone" IAC - CNR.

== Selected works ==
=== Scientific works ===
==== Articles ====
- Ricci, Paolo Emilio (1974), "Sui potenziali di semplice strato per le equazioni ellittiche di ordine superiore in due variabili" [On simple layer potentials for two variables higher order elliptic equations], Rendiconti di Matematica, 6 (in Italian), 7 (1): 1–39, MR 0367446, Zbl 0302.35042.
- Ricci, Paolo Emilio (1975), "Alcune osservazioni sulle potenze delle matrici del secondo ordine e sui polinomi di Tchebycheff di seconda specie" [Some observations on the powers of second order matrices and on Tchebycheff polynomials of the second kind], Atti dell'Accademia delle Scienze di Torino. I. Classe di Scienze Fisiche, Matematiche e Naturali. (in Italian), 109 (3–4), Torino: Accademia delle Scienze di Torino: 405–410, ISSN 0001-4419, MR 0417469, Zbl 0351.15008.
- Ricci, Paolo Emilio (1978), "I polinomi di Tchebycheff in più variabili" [Tchebycheff polynomials in several variables], Rendiconti di Matematica, 6 (in Italian), 11 (2): 295–327, MR 0520295, Zbl 0405.15012.
- Ricci, Paolo Emilio (1999), "Generalized Lucas polynomials, matrix theory, and zero's distribution of orthogonal polynomials", in Rossmann, Jürgen; Takáč, Peter; Wildenhain, Günther (eds.), The Mazʹya anniversary collection. Vol. 2. Rostock Conference on Functional Analysis, Partial Differential Equations and Applications. Papers from the conference held at the University of Rostock, Rostock, August 31–September 4, 1998, Operator Theory: Advances and Applications, vol. 110, Birkhäuser Verlag, pp. 257–274, doi:10.1007/978-3-0348-8672-7_15, ISBN 978-3-7643-6202-7, ISSN 0255-0156, MR 1747883, Zbl 0923.00035.

==== Books ====
- Ricci, Paolo Emilio (2015), Forme canoniche e funzioni di matrice. Teoria di Jordan [Canonical forms and functions of matrices. Jordan theory] (in Italian), Rome: Aracne Editrice, pp. x+92, ISBN 978-88-548-8039-9, MR 3347989, Zbl 1337.15001.
- Ricci, Paolo Emilio (2015), Tecniche operatoriali, polinomi e funzioni speciali [Operator-theoretic techniques, polynomials and special functions] (in Italian), Rome: Aracne Editrice, p. xiii+113, ISBN 978-88-548-8392-5, MR 3417483, Zbl 1330.33001.
- Gielis, Johan; Ricci, Paolo Emilio (2022), From Pythagoras to Fourier and from geometry to nature, Amsterdam: Athena Publishing, pp. xiii+146, doi:10.55060/b.p2fg2n.220215.000, ISBN 978-90-832323-1-7, Zbl 1519.42001.

=== Commemorative, historical, and survey works ===
- Benvenuti, Pietro; Ricci, Paolo Emilio (1990), "Prefazione al volume" [Preface to the volume], in Benvenuti, Pietro; Ricci, Paolo Emilio (eds.), Scritti matematici. Dedicati a Maria Adelaide Sneider [Mathematical works. Dedicated to Maria Adelaide Sneider] (in Italian), Rome: Sapienza University of Rome, p. I. The brief "Introduction" written for the double issue of the "Rendiconti di Matematica" dedicated to Maria Adelaide Sneider.
- Ricci, Paolo E. (June 1996), "Scomparsa del Prof. Gaetano Fichera" [The missing of Gaetano Fichera], Notiziario dell'Unione Matematica Italiana (in Italian), XXIII (6): 48–50.
- Ricci, P. E.; Gilbert, R. P. (1997), "A Short Biography of Gaetano Fichera", Applicable Analysis, 65 (1–2): 1–2, doi:10.1080/00036819708840545, MR 1674583, Zbl 0973.01037.
- Cialdea, Alberto; Lanzara, Flavia; Ricci, Paolo Emilio (2009), "On the Occasion of the 70th Birthday of Vladimir Maz'ya" (PDF), in Cialdea, Alberto; Lanzara, Flavia; Ricci, Paolo Emilio (eds.), Analysis, partial differential equations and applications. The Vladimir Maz'ya anniversary volume. Selected lectures from the International Workshop held at Sapienza University, Rome, June 30–July 3, 2008, Operator Theory: Advances and Applications, vol. 193, Basel: Birkhäuser Verlag, pp. ix–xvii, doi:10.1007/978-3-7643-9898-9, ISBN 978-3-7643-9897-2, ISSN 0255-0156, MR 2760868, Zbl 1173.35006.
- Ricci, Paolo E. (2014), "Gaetano Fichera, life and science Master", in Sbordone, Carlo (ed.), Equazioni a derivate parziali nell'opera di Gaetano Fichera [Partial differential equations in the work of Gaetano Fichera], Quaderni dell'Accademia Pontaniana, vol. 60, Naples: Giannini, pp. 23–29, ISBN 978-88-7431-717-2 is the biographical contribution of Paolo Emilio Ricci in the proceedings of the day dedicated to the memory of Gaetano Fichera (1 June 2011) during the international conference "New Function Spaces in PDEs and Harmonic Analysis", held in Naples from 31 May to 4 June 2011.

== See also ==
- Vladimir Maz'ya
- Superformula
- Superellipse
- Potential theory
