= Squigonometry =

Branch of mathematics

Squigonometry or p-trigonometry is a generalization of traditional trigonometry which replaces the circle and Euclidean distance function with the squircle (shape intermediate between a square and circle) and p-norm. While trigonometry deals with the relationships between angles and lengths in the plane using trigonometric functions defined relative to a unit circle, squigonometry focuses on analogous relationships and functions within the context of a unit squircle.

== Etymology ==
The term squigonometry is a portmanteau of square or squircle and trigonometry. It was used by Derek Holton to refer to an analog of trigonometry using a square as a basic shape (instead of a circle) in his 1990 pamphlet Creating Problems. In 2011 it was used by William Wood to refer to trigonometry with a squircle as its base shape in a recreational mathematics article in Mathematics Magazine. In 2016 Robert Poodiack extended Wood's work in another Mathematics Magazine article. Wood and Poodiack published a book about the topic in 2022.

However, the idea of generalizing trigonometry to curves other than circles is centuries older.

== Squigonometric functions ==
=== Cosquine and squine ===
==== Definition through unit squircle ====
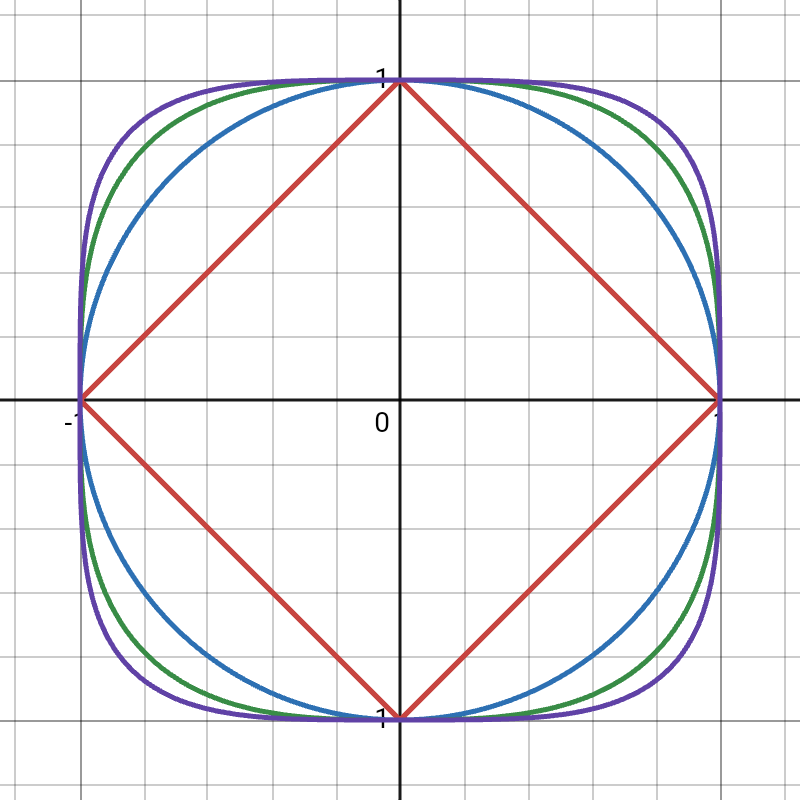
Unit squircle for different values of p

The cosquine and squine functions, denoted as $\operatorname{cq}_p(t)$ and $\operatorname{sq}_p(t),$ can be defined analogously to trigonometric functions on a unit circle, but instead using the coordinates of points on a unit squircle, described by the equation:

$$|x|^p + |y|^p = 1$$

where $p$ is a real number greater than or equal to 1. Here $x$ corresponds to $\operatorname{cq}_p(t)$ and $y$ corresponds to $\operatorname{sq}_p(t)$.

Notably, when $p=2$, the squigonometric functions coincide with the trigonometric functions.

==== Definition through differential equations ====
Similarly to how trigonometric functions are defined through differential equations, the cosquine and squine functions are also uniquely determined by solving the coupled initial value problem

$$\begin{cases}
x'(t)=-|y(t)|^{p-1}\\
y'(t)=|x(t)|^{p-1}\\
x(0)=1\\
y(0)=0
\end{cases}$$

Where $x$ corresponds to $\operatorname{cq}_p(t)$ and $y$ corresponds to $\operatorname{sq}_p(t)$.

==== Definition through analysis ====
The definition of sine and cosine through integrals can be extended to define the squigonometric functions. Let $1<p<\infty$ and define a differentiable function $F_p:[0,1]\rightarrow{{\R}}$ by:

$$F_p (x)=\int_{0}^{x}\frac{1}{{(1-t^p)}^\tfrac{p-1}{p}}\,dt$$

Since $F_p$ is strictly increasing it is a one-to-one function on $[0,1]$ with range $[0,\pi_p/2]$, where $\pi_p$ is defined as follows:

$$\pi_p=2\int_{0}^{1}\frac{1}{{(1-t^p)}^\tfrac{p-1}{p}}\,dt$$

Let $\operatorname{sq}_p$ be the inverse of $F_p$ on $[0,\pi_p/2]$. This function can be extended to $[0,\pi_p]$ by defining the following relationship:

$$\operatorname{sq}_p (x)=\operatorname{sq}_p (\pi_p-x)$$

By this means $\operatorname{sq}_p$ is differentiable in ${{\R}}$ and, corresponding to this, the function $\operatorname{cq}_p$ is defined by:

$$\frac{d}{dx}\operatorname{sq}_p (x) = \operatorname{cq}_p(x)^{p-1}.$$

=== Tanquent, cotanquent, sequent and cosequent ===
The tanquent, cotanquent, sequent and cosequent functions can be defined as follows:

$$\operatorname{tq}_p(t)=\frac{\operatorname{sq}_p(t)}{\operatorname{cq}_p(t)}$$
$$\operatorname{ctq}_p(t)=\frac{\operatorname{cq}_p(t)}{\operatorname{sq}_p(t)}$$
$$\operatorname{seq}_p(t)=\frac{1}{\operatorname{cq}_p(t)}$$
$$\operatorname{csq}_p(t)=\frac{1}{\operatorname{sq}_p(t)}$$

=== Inverse squigonometric functions ===
General versions of the inverse squine and cosquine can be derived from the initial value problem above. Let $x=\operatorname{cq}_p (y)$; by the inverse function rule, $\frac{dx}{dy} =-[\operatorname{sq}_p (y)]^{p-1}=(1-x^p)^{(p-1)/p}$. Solving for $y$ gives the definition of the inverse cosquine:

$$y=\operatorname{cq}_{p}^{-1}(x) = \int_{x}^{1}\frac{1}{(1-t^p)^{\frac{p-1}{p}}}\,dt$$

Similarly, the inverse squine is defined as:

$$\operatorname{sq}_{p}^{-1}(x) = \int_{0}^{x}\frac{1}{(1-t^p)^{\frac{p-1}{p}}}\,dt$$

=== Multiple ways to approach squigonometry ===
Other parameterizations of squircles give rise to alternate definitions of these functions. For example, Edmunds, Lang, and Gurka define $\tilde F_ p(x)$ as:

$\tilde F_p (x)= \int_{0}^{x}(1-t^p)^{-(1/p)}\,dt$.

Since $F_p$ is strictly increasing it has an inverse which, by analogy with the case $p=2$, we denote by $\sin_p$. This is defined on the interval $[0,\pi_p/2]$, where $\tilde \pi_p$ is defined as follows:

$\tilde \pi_p=2 \int_{0}^{1}(1-t^p)^{-(1/p)}\,dt$.

Because of this, we know that $\sin_p$ is strictly increasing on $[0,\tilde \pi_p/2]$, $\sin_p(0)=0$ and $\sin_p(\tilde \pi_p/2)=1$. We extend $\sin_p$ to $[0,\tilde \pi_p]$ by defining:

$\sin_p(x)=\sin_p(\tilde \pi_p-x)$ for $x \in[\tilde \pi_p/2,\tilde \pi_p ]$ Similarly $\cos_p(x)=(1-(\sin_p(x))^p)^\frac{1}{p}$.

Thus $\cos_p$ is strictly decreasing on $[0,\tilde \pi_p/2]$, $\cos_p(0)=1$ and $\cos_p(\tilde \pi_2/2)=0$. Also:

$|\sin_px|^p+|\cos_px|^p=1$ .

This is immediate if $x \in [0,\tilde \pi/2 ]$, but it holds for all $x \in \R$ in view of symmetry and periodicity.

== Applications ==
Squigonometric substitution can be used to solve indefinite integrals using a method akin to trigonometric substitution, such as integrals in the generic form

$$I = \int ({1-t^p})^\frac{1}{p}\,dt$$

that are otherwise computationally difficult to handle.

Squigonometry has been applied to find expressions for the volume of superellipsoids, such as the superegg.

== See also ==
- Astroid
- Ellipsoid
- L^{p} spaces
- Oval
- Squround
