= Lamé's special quartic =

Graph of an equation

Lamé's special quartic with "radius" 1.

Lamé's special quartic, named after Gabriel Lamé, is the graph of the equation

$$x^4 + y^4 = r^4$$

where $r > 0$. It looks like a rounded square with "sides" of length $2r$ and centered on the origin. This curve is a squircle centered on the origin, and it is a special case of a superellipse.

Because of Pierre de Fermat's only surviving proof, that of the n = 4 case of Fermat's Last Theorem, if r is rational there is no non-trivial rational point (x, y) on this curve (that is, no point for which both x and y are non-zero rational numbers).
