= Jotun Hein =

British statistician (born 1956)

- Born: 19 July 1956 (age 70)
- Scientific career
- Fields: Bioinformatics
- Workplaces: Aarhus University; University of Oxford

Jotun John Piet Hein (born 19 July 1956) is Professor of Bioinformatics at the Department of Statistics of the University of Oxford and a professorial fellow of University College, Oxford. Hein was previously Director of the Bioinformatics Research Centre at Aarhus University, Denmark.

Hein is the fourth son of Piet Hein, the Danish scientist, mathematician, inventor, designer, author, and poet who wrote the famed Grooks poetry collections and invented the Superegg and the Soma cube. When he was 12 years old, Jotun proved the Soma cube's "Basalt Rock" construction impossible, which was published in the puzzle's instruction manual as "Jotun's Proof."

Hein's research interests are in molecular evolution, molecular population genetics and bioinformatics.

== Selected books ==
- Hein, J; Schierup, M. H., and Wiuf, C. Gene Genealogies, Variation and Evolution – A Primer in Coalescent Theory. Oxford University Press, 2005. ISBN 0-19-852996-1.
