= Squoval =

Squoval may refer to:

A mostly rectangular figure, with rounded corners.

- Squoval nail, a manicured fingernail shape
- A trademarked bicycle frame used by Cervélo

== See also ==
- Squircle
