= Gabriel Lamé =

French mathematician (1795–1870)

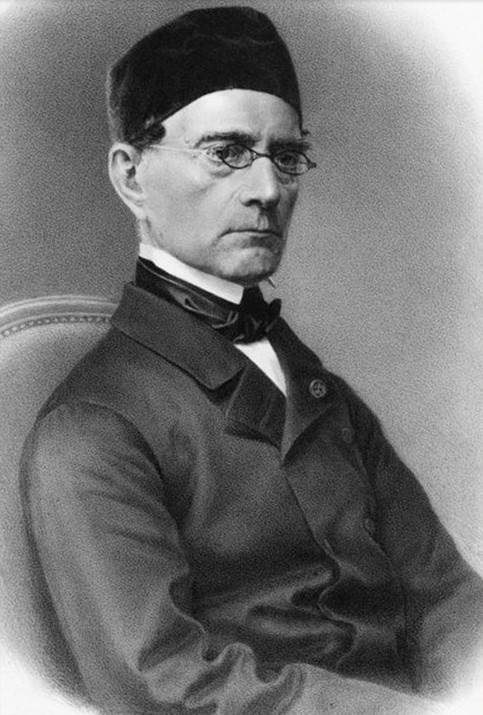
- Born: 22 July 1795; Tours, France
- Died: 1 May 1870 (aged 74); Paris, France
- Known for: Euclidean algorithm Lamé coefficients Lamé curve Lamé function Lamé parameters Lamé's special quartic
- Scientific career
- Fields: Mathematics

Gabriel Lamé (22 July 1795 – 1 May 1870) was a French mathematician who contributed to the theory of partial differential equations by the use of curvilinear coordinates, and the mathematical theory of elasticity (for which linear elasticity and finite strain theory elaborate the mathematical abstractions).

== Biography ==
Lamé was born in Tours, in today's département of Indre-et-Loire.

He became well known for his general theory of curvilinear coordinates and his notation and study of classes of ellipse-like curves, now known as Lamé curves or superellipses, and defined by the equation:

$$\left|\,{x\over a}\,\right|^n + \left|\,{y\over b}\,\right|^n = 1$$

where n is any positive real number.

He is also known for his running time analysis of the Euclidean algorithm, marking the beginning of computational complexity theory. In 1844, using Fibonacci numbers, he proved that when finding the greatest common divisor of integers a and b, the algorithm runs in no more than 5k steps, where k is the number of (decimal) digits of b. He also proved a special case of Fermat's Last Theorem. He actually thought that he found a complete proof for the theorem, but his proof was flawed. The Lamé functions are part of the theory of ellipsoidal harmonics.

He worked on a wide variety of different topics. Often problems in the engineering tasks he undertook led him to study mathematical questions. For example, his work on the stability of vaults and on the design of suspension bridges led him to work on elasticity theory. In fact this was not a passing interest, for Lamé made substantial contributions to this topic. Another example is his work on the conduction of heat which led him to his theory of curvilinear coordinates.

Curvilinear coordinates proved a very powerful tool in Lamé's hands. He used them to transform Laplace's equation into ellipsoidal coordinates and so separate the variables and solve the resulting equation.

His most significant contribution to engineering was to accurately define the stresses and capabilities of a press fit joint, such as that seen in a dowel pin in a housing.

In 1854, he was elected a foreign member of the Royal Swedish Academy of Sciences.

Lamé died in Paris in 1870. His name is one of the 72 names inscribed on the Eiffel Tower.

== Books ==
- 1818: Examen des différentes méthodes employées pour résoudre les problèmes de géométrie ( Vve Courcier)
- 1840: Cours de physique de l'Ecole Polytechnique. Tome premier, Propriétés générales des corps—Théorie physique de la chaleur (Bachelier)
- 1840: Cours de physique de l'Ecole Polytechnique. Tome deuxième, Acoustique—Théorie physique de la lumière (Bachelier)
- 1840: Cours de physique de l'Ecole Polytechnique. Tome troisième, Electricité-Magnétisme-Courants électriques-Radiations (Bachelier)
- 1852: Leçons sur la théorie mathématique de l'élasticité des corps solides (Bachelier)
- 1857: Leçons sur les fonctions inverses des transcendantes et les surfaces isothermes (Mallet-Bachelier)
- 1859: Leçons sur les coordonnées curvilignes et leurs diverses applications (Mallet-Bachelier)
- 1861: Leçons sur la théorie analytique de la chaleur (Mallet-Bachelier)

== See also ==
- Lamé’s Theorem
- Euclidean algorithm (Algorithmic efficiency)
- Lamé crater
- Piet Hein
- Julius Plücker
- Helmholtz equation
- Proof of Fermat's Last Theorem for specific exponents
- Stefan problem
