= Nimbi =

Nimbi may refer to:

- A game invented by Piet Hein (Denmark)
- A plural of nimbus or halo in religious iconography
