= Fleischers Kjemiske Fabrikker =

Former Norwegian paint manufacturer

- Formerly: Fleischers Kemiske Fabrik A/S; Norsk Kjemisk & Farvefabrikk A/S; Norsk Kjemisk A/S
- Company type: Aksjeselskap
- Industry: Paint
- Founded: 1923
- Defunct: 1982
- Fate: Merged into Jotun; Bergen production closed
- Headquarters: Bergen, Norway
- Key people: Jacob Blaauw Fleischer
- Products: Paint, varnish, chemical products

Fleischers Kjemiske Fabrikker was a paint manufacturer in Bergen. The company was established in 1923 by Jacob Blaauw Fleischer and was for over 50 years one of the country's leading paint factories. One of Norway's best-known brands of exterior paint, Drygolin, was developed at Fleischers.

In 1972 the firm became part of Jotun, and in 1982 the production in Bergen was closed in favor of Sandefjord and new Jotun factories abroad.

== History ==
=== Background ===
Jacob Blaauw Fleischer (1892–1969) trained at the Bergen Technical School and then studied chemistry at one of the prestigious German technical colleges, in Aachen. In 1915 he returned to his home town and the same year established Kemisk fabrik Monopol, which produced, among other things, an enamel lacquer of the Emaljol brand. In 1922 the company went bankrupt, and the business was taken over that year by Torbjørn Hermanrud (1887–1961).

=== Fleischers Kemiske Fabrik A/S ===
After some difficult years, Fleischer started Fleischers Kemiske Fabrik A/S in 1923. The name covered what was in reality cellar production of stove blacking and shoe polish, not unlike a number of small chemical home industries that started at this time. In 1927 the firm took the new name Norsk Kjemisk & Farvefabrikk in Bergen.

Fleischer's ambitions were large, and he moved the business to the closed Solheim wire factory, whose premises then also housed a car workshop, an organ-building shop, and various small industry; Fleischers' factory gradually took over the whole and bought the property in 1943. In 1942 the company changed its name to Norsk Kjemisk A/S, but this did not last long: in 1942–1943 it became Fleischers Kjemiske Fabrikker, because the German occupiers disliked company names containing "Norge" or "Norsk."

=== A new type of alkyd paint ===
Fleischer's paint products operated in the transition between traditional oil-based paints and new synthetic substances. The chemical engineer invested in further chemical development and hired young chemists with the same qualifications he had himself, and in the 1940s Fleischer had the industry's largest development laboratory. This work secured the company a lead in developing new types of paint that used the best advances from the world's chemical industry, in paint meaning alkyd resins, industrially made mixtures of chemically modified alcohols and fatty acids. The scientific grounding of the paint secured product development and also had advertising value in itself, guaranteeing modern and scientific products.

=== Drygolin and other brands ===
The scientific development of the products was used in marketing alongside more traditional salesmanship, brand-building, and advertising. Fleischer's advertising mascot became a genuine Bergen "tjuagutt" (street urchin), taking on Alf Bjercke's painter with an alpine cap and goatee, and Jotun's penguin. Fleischer's background in a Bergen merchant family secured the right commercial thinking in the launch of brands such as Kopalin, the textile chemical Prelle, and the shoe polish Solpuss.

The best-known brand name from Fleischer came in 1948 and is still a leading brand of exterior paint: Drygolin. The name was put together from dryg (economical), god (good), and lin as in linseed oil, even though the product mainly consisted of modern linseed-oil substitutes such as alkyd resin. The quality of the paint was to be guaranteed by an engineer-heavy staff in modern laboratories and factory premises, and not least by a large test facility on the roof in the country's most weather-exposed city.

Fleischer hired many skilled salesmen who worked markets across the country in competition with other strong paint brands, Alf Bjercke and Jotun being the two largest, and where they could not gain entry to local shops they opened their own outlets, so that by 1971 the company owned 17 shops and was a co-owner of 24 others. In the 1950s and 1960s Fleischers Kjemiske Fabrikker was best known for paint for exterior woodwork and paint adapted to the fishing and catching fleet; it also dominated the western Norway market for interior paint and was the country's largest in floor varnish. The varnish brand Aristokrat is said to be another example of Fleischer's commercial instinct, as he held that such a name could in itself justify a far higher price than most competitors.

=== The sons cooperate with the arch-rivals ===
When Fleischer died in 1969, his two sons had long since taken over operations. They led the company into modern industrial times with cooperation rather than competition in small home markets, and to stand stronger in increasing international competition, cooperation was begun with the arch-rivals in Oslo, Sandefjord, and Fredrikstad. Alf Bjercke, Jotun, Fleischers, and the paint division of Denofa Lilleborg gathered in the Jotun group in 1972.

=== Slow wind-down and closure ===
Although the production plants were kept the first few years, all signs pointed toward Sandefjord and out of the country to new factories in low-cost countries. Had the Sandefjord factory not been destroyed by fire in 1976, the Bergen factory would probably have been closed earlier than 1982. The factory at Manger was kept and was in production until the end of 2012.

Jotun's test laboratory also kept a department in Bergen, as the city's weather suited the testing of paint products, though the main reason it remained was that the laboratory head Tore Jan Lund (1942–2015) preferred not to move to Sandefjord when the factory was closed in 1982. To keep his valuable expertise, he was allowed to keep the laboratory in Bergen, but it was closed when he retired in 2011.

=== Environmental damage ===
In the years that followed, Jotun had to use considerable resources to clean up local pollution around the factory site. The site was then sold to the Radøy group, which invested in it for future industrial activity, where the quay conditions and proximity to the shipping lane were advantages.

== Bibliography ==
- Bryn, Torstein (1997). Visjon, farve, form: Jotuns historie. Jotun A/S.
