= Superformula =

Equation in polar coordinates

The superformula is a generalization of the superellipse and was proposed by Johan Gielis in 2003. Gielis suggested that the formula can be used to describe many complex shapes and curves that are found in nature. Gielis has filed a patent application related to the synthesis of patterns generated by the superformula, which expired effective 2020-05-10.

In polar coordinates, with $r$ the radius and $\varphi$ the angle, the superformula is:

$$r\left(\varphi\right) =
\left(
\left|
\frac{\cos\left(\frac{m\varphi}{4}\right)}{a}
\right| ^{n_2}
+
\left|
\frac{\sin\left(\frac{m\varphi}{4}\right)}{b}
\right| ^{n_3}
\right) ^{-\frac{1}{n_{1}}}.$$
By choosing different values for the parameters $a, b, m, n_1, n_2,$ and $n_3,$ different shapes can be generated.

The formula was obtained by generalizing the superellipse, named and popularized by Piet Hein, a Danish mathematician.

== 2D plots ==
In the following examples the values shown above each figure should be m, n_{1}, n_{2} and n_{3}.

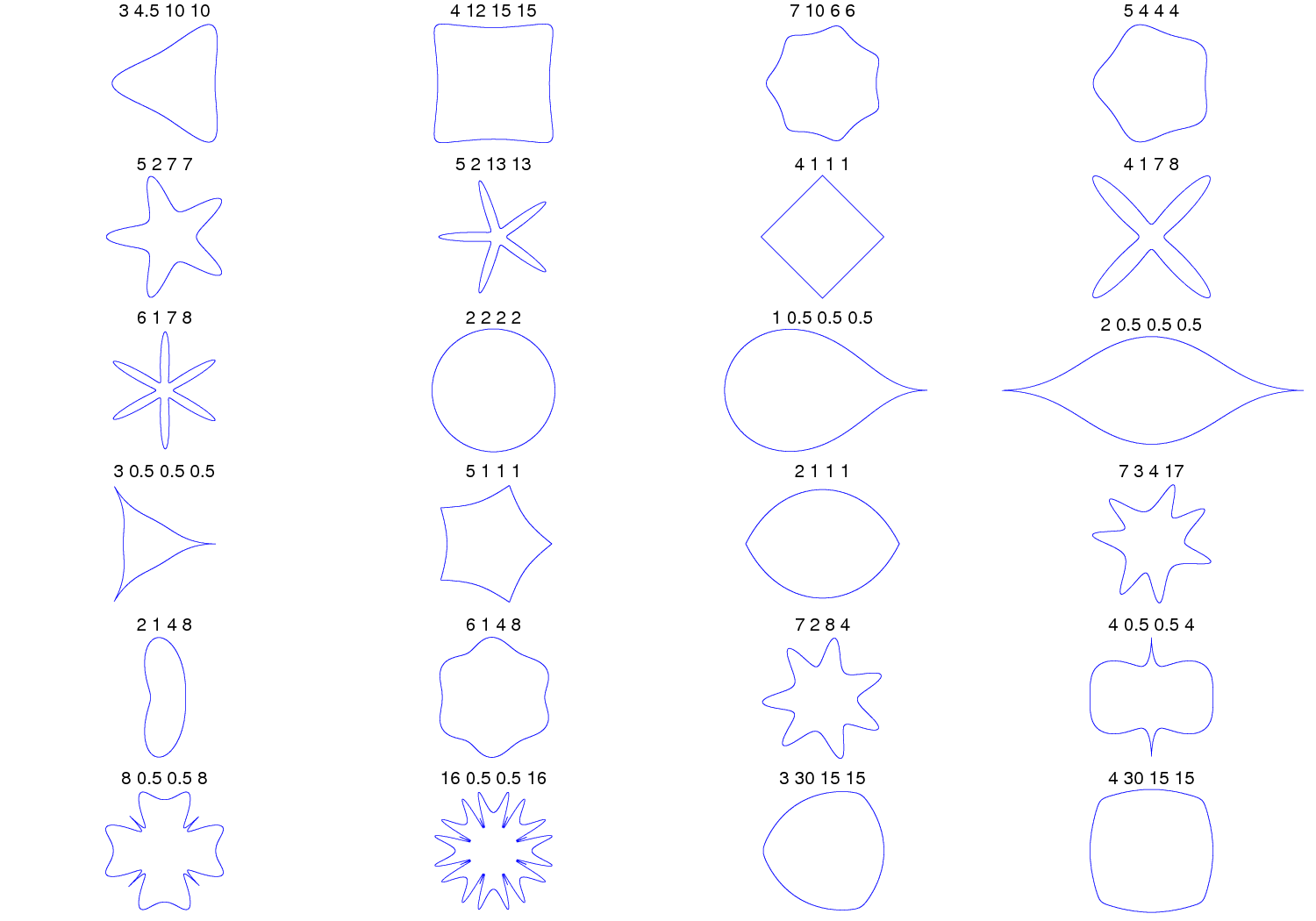

A GNU Octave program for generating these figures

function sf2d(n, a)
  u = [0:.001:2 * pi];
  raux = abs(1 / a(1) .* abs(cos(n(1) * u / 4))) .^ n(3) + abs(1 / a(2) .* abs(sin(n(1) * u / 4))) .^ n(4);
  r = abs(raux) .^ (- 1 / n(2));
  x = r .* cos(u);
  y = r .* sin(u);
  plot(x, y);
end

== Extension to higher dimensions ==
It is possible to extend the formula to 3, 4, or n dimensions, by means of the spherical product of superformulas. For example, the 3D parametric surface is obtained by multiplying two superformulas r_{1} and r_{2}. The coordinates are defined by the relations:

$$x = r_1(\theta)\cos\theta \cdot r_2(\phi)\cos\phi,$$
$$y = r_1(\theta)\sin\theta \cdot r_2(\phi)\cos\phi,$$
$$z = r_2(\phi)\sin\phi,$$

where $\phi$ (latitude) varies between −π/2 and π/2 and θ (longitude) between −π and π.

== 3D plots ==
3D superformula: a = b = 1; m, n_{1}, n_{2} and n_{3} are shown in the pictures.

A GNU Octave program for generating these figures:

function sf3d(n, a)
  u = [- pi:.05:pi];
  v = [- pi / 2:.05:pi / 2];
  nu = length(u);
  nv = length(v);
  for i = 1:nu
    for j = 1:nv
      raux1 = abs(1 / a(1) * abs(cos(n(1) .* u(i) / 4))) .^ n(3) + abs(1 / a(2) * abs(sin(n(1) * u(i) / 4))) .^ n(4);
      r1 = abs(raux1) .^ (- 1 / n(2));
      raux2 = abs(1 / a(1) * abs(cos(n(1) * v(j) / 4))) .^ n(3) + abs(1 / a(2) * abs(sin(n(1) * v(j) / 4))) .^ n(4);
      r2 = abs(raux2) .^ (- 1 / n(2));
      x(i, j) = r1 * cos(u(i)) * r2 * cos(v(j));
      y(i, j) = r1 * sin(u(i)) * r2 * cos(v(j));
      z(i, j) = r2 * sin(v(j));
    endfor;
  endfor;
  mesh(x, y, z);
endfunction;

== Generalization ==
The superformula can be generalized by allowing distinct m parameters in the two terms of the superformula. By replacing the first parameter $m$ with y and second parameter $m$ with z:
$$r\left(\varphi\right) =
\left(
\left|
\frac{\cos\left(\frac{y\varphi}{4}\right)}{a}
\right| ^{n_2}
+
\left|
\frac{\sin\left(\frac{z\varphi}{4}\right)}{b}
\right| ^{n_3}
\right) ^{-\frac{1}{n_{1}}}$$

This allows the creation of rotationally asymmetric and nested structures. In the following examples a, b, ${n_2}$ and ${n_3}$ are 1:
