= Mayfield Dairy =

Dairy products company in the United States

Mayfield Dairy Farms
- Type: Subsidiary
- Industry: Dairy
- Founded: 1923; 103 years ago
- Founder: T.B. Mayfield, Jr.
- Headquarters: Athens, Tennessee, U.S.
- Area served: Southeastern United States
- Key people: Scottie Mayfield (president)
- Products: Milk, chocolate milk, ice cream, juice
- Number of employees: 350-400
- Parent: Dean Foods (1990-2020), Dairy Farmers of America (2020-present)
- Website: mayfielddairy.com

Mayfield Dairy Farms is an American dairy products company, with its headquarters in Athens, Tennessee and additional production plants in Birmingham, Alabama. From 1990 to 2020 it was under the ownership of Dean Foods. Dairy Farmers of America acquired Dean Foods, and therefore Mayfield, in March 2020.

Current Mayfield's range of products include milk, chocolate milk, ice cream, and juice.

== History ==
The company was founded in 1923 by T.B. Mayfield, Jr., and is now run by his grandson, Scottie Mayfield. It employs nearly 2,000 people. Mayfield products are sold in twelve states: Tennessee, Georgia, Alabama, South Carolina, North Carolina, Florida, Kentucky, Virginia, Maryland, Ohio, Louisiana, Mississippi and Delaware.

Dean Foods bought Mayfield Dairy in 1990.

== Innovations ==
Mayfield is known for a history of innovation. The company boasts that founder T.B. Mayfield had the first milk plant in the area capable of pasteurizing milk.

In 1970 Mayfield's Athens plant was the first in the industry to successfully implement in-plant blow-molding for production of plastic milk jugs. In 1988 Mayfield was the first dairy to use an opaque plastic milk jug that protects milk from ultraviolet light. In 1995, Mayfield launched the single-serve Chug milk bottle for Dean Foods. The single-serve bottle increased milk consumption by letting milk compete with single-serving soft drinks. In 2002 its Clik-Top re-sealable ice cream carton, including a break-seal that makes the package easier to open and a locking tab to keep the carton closed during storage, was greeted as a packaging first.

In 2006 Mayfield started a multi-author company blog, featuring posts by CEO Scottie Mayfield, stories from inside the business, news about new ice cream flavors, and articles submitted by customers. The Mayfield Dairy Blog was featured on the Diva Marketing Blog as an example of the use of social media in marketing. In 2007 the company won an Effie Award, presented by the American Marketing Association for successfully marketing four new ice cream flavors without discounts, using a campaign in which customers were encouraged to "vote" for their favorite new flavor.

== Visitor centers ==
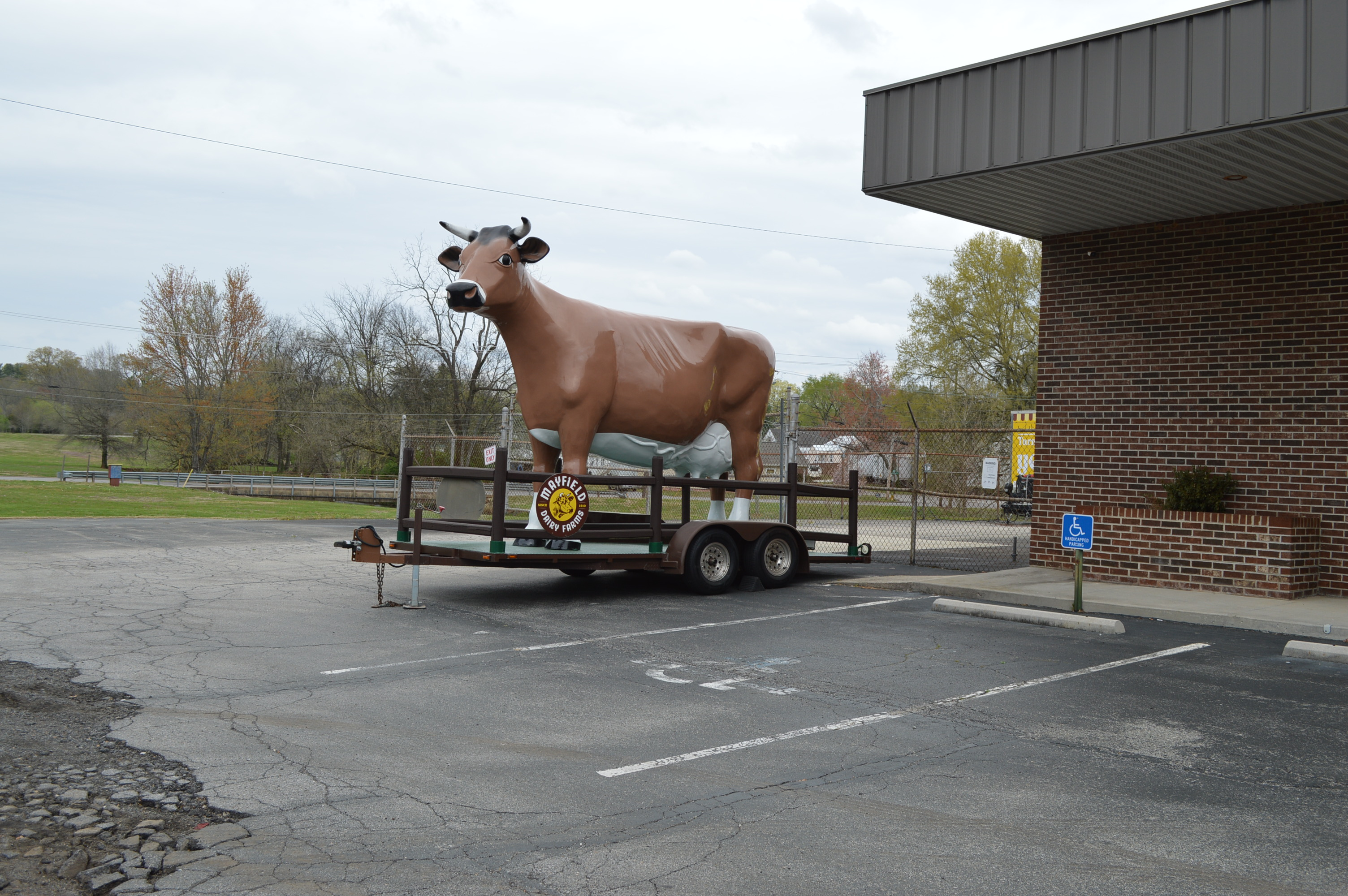
Mayfield's cow

The company maintains a visitor center in Athens, Tennessee and offers tours of its production plant there. The company shut down its only other visitor center, located in Braselton, Georgia, in 2020.

== See also ==
- Squround
