= Jotun =

Jotun may refer to:

- Jötunn, a type of entity in Germanic mythology
- Jotun (company), a Norwegian company
- "Jotun", a song by In Flames
- Jotun (video game), a 2015 video game developed by Thunder Lotus Games
- Jotun Hein (born 1956), British statistician
