= Scottie Mayfield =

American businessman

- Born: 1950 or 1951 (age 75–76); Athens, Tennessee
- Education: Georgia Tech; Emory University
- Occupation: President of Mayfield Dairy

Scottie Mayfield (born 1950/1951) is the president of Mayfield Dairy Farms.

== Early life and education ==
Since he was 11 years old, Mayfield worked for the family business. Mr. Mayfield was a graduate of the Baylor School in Chattanooga and a 1973 graduate of Georgia Tech's College of Management. He went on to earn an Executive MBA from Emory University in 1986.

== Career ==
Mayfield's grandfather founded Mayfield Dairy Farms. After graduation, Mayfield returned to the family business, and was named president of the organization in 1995. Mayfield handles most of the firm's advertising.

Mayfield ran against US representative Chuck Fleischmann in the 2012 Republican primary election in Tennessee's 3rd congressional district. He finished in second place behind Fleischmann, who received 39.1% to Mayfield's 31%.
