= Johan Gielis =

Belgian engineer, scientist, mathematician, and entrepreneur

- Born: July 8, 1962 (age 64)
- Citizenship: Belgian
- Known for: Proposing the superformula
- Scientific career
- Thesis: Universal Natural Shapes (2010)
- Website: https://scholar.google.nl/citations?user=b9Q6yVMAAAAJ&hl=nl

Johan Gielis (born July 8, 1962) is a Belgian engineer, scientist, mathematician, and entrepreneur. Gielis is known for his contributions to the field of mathematics, specifically in the area of modeling and geometrical methods. He is best known for developing the concept of the superformula, which is a generalization of the traditional Pythagorean theorem and the equation of the circle, that can generate a wide variety of complex shapes found in nature.

== Career ==
Gielis obtained a degree in horticultural engineering. Later, he changed direction from botany and plant biotechnology to geometry and mathematics. In 2013, Gielis co founded the Antenna Company, in Eindhoven. The company applies the superfomula to develop efficient antennas to transmit data via various frequencies. The company made antenna system for ultra-fast WiFi 6 devices. Antenna systems focus on 2-7 gigaHertz, in line with the IEEE 802.11ax standard and beyond. Other products focus on Internet of Things and mmWave antenna systems.

== Superformula ==
Gielis proposed the superformula in 2003. The superfomula is a generalization of the superellipse. He suggested that it allows for the creation of shapes that can mimic natural forms such as flowers, shells, and other intricate structures. The mathematical equation combines elements of trigonometry and algebra to generate complex and visually appealing patterns. It also allowed for a generalization of minimal surfaces based on a more general notion of the energy functional and allowed for a generalized definition of the Laplacian, and the use of Fourier projection methods to solve boundary value problems.

$$\frac{1}{r} =\sqrt[n_1]{\,\left| \frac{1}{a} \cos \left( \frac{m}{4} \phi \right) \right|^{n_2} + \left| \frac{1}{b} \sin \left( \frac{m}{4} \phi \right) \right|^{n_3}}$$

r - distance from the center, Φ - Angle to the x-axis, m - symmetry, n_{1}, n_{2}, n_{3}: - Form, a, b: - expansion (semi-axes)

Gielis patented the synthesis of patterns generated by the superformula. The superformula was used in No Man's Sky, an action-adventure survival game developed and published by Hello Games. The formula was also used in the Jewels of the Sea.

== Publications ==
=== Books ===
- Modeling in Mathematics Proceedings of the Second Tbilisi-Salerno Workshop on Modeling in Mathematics 2017
- Inventing the Circle
- The geometrical beauty of plants
- Universal Natural Shapes

=== Journals ===
- A generic geometric transformation that unifies a wide range of natural and abstract shapes
- Diatom frustule morphogenesis and function: a multidisciplinary survey
- Somatic embryogenesis from mature Bambusa balcooa Roxburgh as basis for mass production of elite forestry bamboos
- Tissue culture strategies for genetic improvement of bamboo
- Computer implemented tool box systems and methods
- Superquadrics with rational and irrational symmetry
- Comparison of dwarf bamboos (Indocalamus sp.) leaf parameters to determine relationship between spatial density of plants and total leaf area per plant
- A general leaf area geometric formula exists for plants—Evidence from the simplified Gielis equation
