= Superquadrics =

Family of geometric shapes

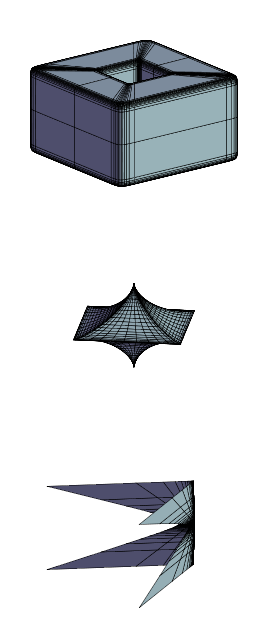
Some superquadrics.

In mathematics, the superquadrics or super-quadrics (also superquadratics) are a family of geometric shapes defined by formulas that resemble those of ellipsoids and other quadrics, except that the squaring operations are replaced by arbitrary powers. They can be seen as the three-dimensional relatives of the superellipses. The term may refer to the solid object or to its surface, depending on the context. The equations below specify the surface; the solid is specified by replacing the equality signs by less-than-or-equal signs.

The superquadrics include many shapes that resemble cubes, octahedra, cylinders, lozenges and spindles, with rounded or sharp corners. Because of their flexibility and relative simplicity, they are popular geometric modeling tools, especially in computer graphics. It becomes an important geometric primitive widely used in computer vision, robotics, and physical simulation.

Some authors, such as Alan Barr, define "superquadrics" as including both the superellipsoids and the supertoroids. In modern computer vision literature, superquadrics and superellipsoids are used interchangeably, since superellipsoids are the most representative and widely utilized shape among all the superquadrics. Comprehensive coverage of geometrical properties of superquadrics and methods of their recovery from range images and point clouds are covered in several computer vision literatures.

== Formulas ==
=== Implicit equation ===
The surface of the basic superquadric is given by

$$\left|x\right|^r + \left|y\right|^s + \left|z\right|^t =1$$

where r, s, and t are positive real numbers that determine the main features of the superquadric. Namely:

- less than 1: a pointy octahedron modified to have concave faces and sharp edges.
- exactly 1: a regular octahedron.
- between 1 and 2: an octahedron modified to have convex faces, blunt edges and blunt corners.
- exactly 2: a sphere
- greater than 2: a cube modified to have rounded edges and corners.
- infinite (in the limit): a cube

Each exponent can be varied independently to obtain combined shapes. For example, if r=s=2, and t=4, one obtains a solid of revolution which resembles an ellipsoid with round cross-section but flattened ends. This formula is a special case of the superellipsoid's formula if (and only if) r = s.

If any exponent is allowed to be negative, the shape extends to infinity. Such shapes are sometimes called super-hyperboloids.

The basic shape above spans from -1 to +1 along each coordinate axis. The general superquadric is the result of scaling this basic shape by different amounts A, B, C along each axis. Its general equation is

$$\left|\frac{x}{A}\right|^r + \left|\frac{y}{B}\right|^s + \left|\frac{z}{C}\right|^t = 1.$$

=== Parametric description ===
Parametric equations in terms of surface parameters u and v (equivalent to longitude and latitude if m equals 2) are

$$\begin{align}
x(u,v) &{}= A g\left(v,\frac{2}{r}\right) g\left(u,\frac{2}{r}\right) \\
y(u,v) &{}= B g\left(v,\frac{2}{s}\right) f\left(u,\frac{2}{s}\right) \\
z(u,v) &{}= C f\left(v,\frac{2}{t}\right) \\
& -\frac{\pi}{2} \le v \le \frac{\pi}{2}, \quad -\pi \le u < \pi ,
\end{align}$$

where the auxiliary functions are

$$\begin{align}
f(\omega,m) &{}= \sgn(\sin \omega) \left|\sin \omega \right|^m \\
g(\omega,m) &{}= \sgn(\cos \omega) \left|\cos \omega \right|^m
\end{align}$$

and the sign function sgn(x) is

$$\sgn(x) = \begin{cases}
-1, & x < 0 \\
0, & x = 0 \\
+1, & x > 0 .
\end{cases}$$

=== Spherical product ===
Barr introduces the spherical product which given two plane curves produces a 3D surface. If
$$f(\mu)=\begin{pmatrix}f_1(\mu) \\ f_2(\mu)\end{pmatrix},\quad g(\nu)=\begin{pmatrix}g_1(\nu)\\g_2(\nu)\end{pmatrix}$$
are two plane curves then the spherical product is
$$h(\mu,\nu) = f(\mu)\otimes g(\nu) = \begin{pmatrix} f_1(\mu)\ g_1(\nu) \\ f_1(\mu)\ g_2(\nu) \\ f_2(\mu) \end{pmatrix}$$
This is similar to the typical parametric equation of a sphere:
$$\begin{align}
x&=x_{0}+r\sin \theta \;\cos \varphi \\
y&=y_{0}+r\sin \theta \;\sin \varphi \qquad (0\leq \theta \leq \pi ,\;0\leq \varphi <2\pi )\\
z&=z_{0}+r\cos \theta
\end{align}$$
which give rise to the name spherical product.

Barr uses the spherical product to define quadric surfaces, like ellipsoids, and hyperboloids as well as the torus, superellipsoid, superquadric hyperboloids of one and two sheets, and supertoroids.

== Plotting code ==
The following GNU Octave code generates a mesh approximation of a superquadric:

function superquadric(epsilon, a)
  n = 50;
  etamax = pi / 2;
  etamin = -pi / 2;
  wmax = pi;
  wmin = -pi;
  deta = (etamax - etamin) / n;
  dw = (wmax - wmin) / n;
  [i, j] = meshgrid(1:n+1, 1:n+1)
  eta = etamin + (i - 1) * deta;
  w   = wmin + (j - 1) * dw;
  x = a(1) .* sign(cos(eta)) .* abs(cos(eta)).^epsilon(1) .* sign(cos(w)) .* abs(cos(w)).^epsilon(1);
  y = a(2) .* sign(cos(eta)) .* abs(cos(eta)).^epsilon(2) .* sign(sin(w)) .* abs(sin(w)).^epsilon(2);
  z = a(3) .* sign(sin(eta)) .* abs(sin(eta)).^epsilon(3);

  mesh(x, y, z);
end

== See also ==
- Superegg
- Superellipsoid
- Ellipsoid
