= Squround =

Container with a shape between a square and a round tub

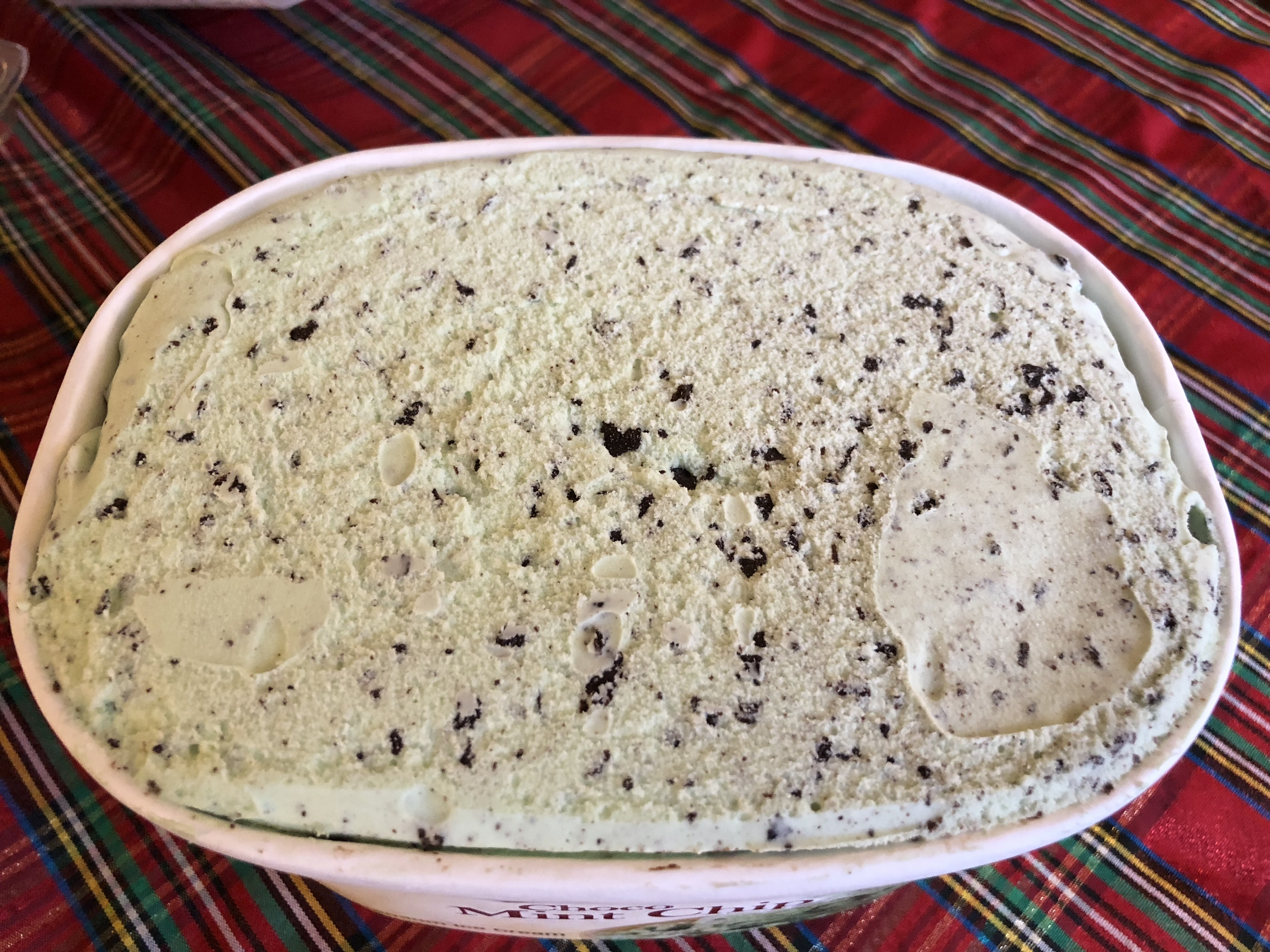
Ice cream in a squround container.

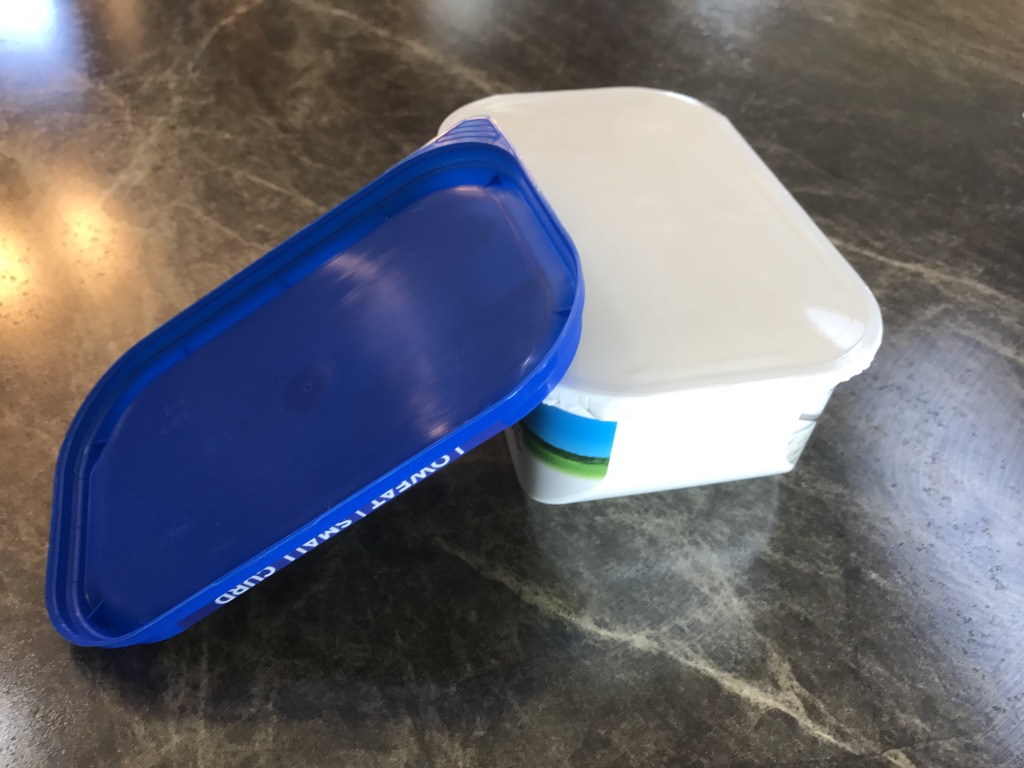
Round corner tub of cottage cheese, lid, and lidding film

A squround, scround or sqround is a container with a shape between a square and a round tub. It resembles an oval but is sometimes closer to a rectangle with rounded corners. These allow the contents to be easily scooped out of the container. The name is a portmanteau for "square round" (cartons), referring to a compromise between a square and a round carton.

As an adjective, squround has been applied to other objects, such as watches or swimming pools.

== Usage within food packaging ==
=== Ice cream squround containers ===
The term applies mostly to ice cream packaging design, where the switch to a squround from paperboard bricks, cylindrical half-gallons and other containers is motivated by consumer preference, as well as cost effectiveness. These packages are more rectangular than square, but the side edges are rounded, while top and bottom surfaces are completely flat. Squround packaging affords some of the consumer appeal of traditional cylindrical packaging, while also packing tightly like brick-shaped square cartons.

The container is usually made of paperboard but can have thermoformed or injection molded plastic components. There is usually a separate lid made of paperboard, plastic, or both.

It offers several advantages over other ice cream packages:

- It can be easily scooped out
- It packs more tightly than previous designs
- It allows more efficient use of retail shelf space and home freezer space
- It allows for better brand recognition (over the round half-gallon) since the flatter front is a more legible "billboard" for each flavor
- The lid can have tamper-evident features, usually in the form of a tab to break before the lid can be removed
- The lid has a tighter seal

Although squrounds are available in traditional half-gallon sizes, there exists a trend toward marketing non-traditional 56-ounce, and in recent years, smaller 48-ounce sized cartons. The downsizing in carton size has not seemed to negatively affect unit sales.

Mayfield Dairy, which announced the switch to squround cartons in January 2003, told Food Engineering in April that they expect to sell the same number of 56 oz. units in 2003 as it sold 64 oz. cartons in 2002. Breyers, which in 2000 was an early adopter of the smaller package for its "Ice Cream Parlor" brands, as of 2005 uses the smaller package across all its ice cream flavors. In 2008, they changed to a smaller 48 oz container.

=== Other squround containers ===
Outside the sector of ice cream, Nestlé have also produced squround containers for its Nescafe range of large instant coffee tins. They attributed the new design to make the containers "simple to hold, pour and store". In a separate interview, they also stated that the design will help to reduce the number of lids lost and to make their tins easier to grasp.

== See also ==
- Squircle
- Fillet (mechanics)
- Chamfer
