= Grook =

Form of poetry created by Danish polymath Piet Hein

A grook (Danish: gruk) is a form of short aphoristic poem or rhyming aphorism created by the Danish poet, designer, inventor, and scientist Piet Hein. He wrote over 7,000 of them from 1939 until his death in 1996, mostly in Danish (Note: This webpage is a database of over 7,000 gruks by Piet Hein, in Danish. The page says (in Danish) that you can freely search it and have them emailed directly to you.). The grooks are multi-faceted and characterized by irony, paradox, brevity, precise use of language, rhythm and rhyme, and an often satiric nature. Many of the grooks have an accompanying line drawing, which provides additional meaning.

Some say that the name "gruk" is short for "grin & suk" (lit. 'laugh & sigh'), but Piet Hein said he felt that the word had come out of thin air. The contemporary "Hunden Grog" ("Grog the Dog") stories by fellow cartoonist Storm P. have, in public opinion, been regarded as an inspiration.

== Grooks as passive resistance ==
Piet Hein was president of the Anti-Nazi Union when the Germans invaded Denmark in 1940. (Note: A long article in Life Magazine talks about Piet Hein's becoming a passive resister beginning on page 63. It corroborates what is said here. At the time, he thought there would be 4-5 grooks, not the ~7,000 that he later wrote.) He became an underground passive resister. He found a way to encourage resistance through the use of poems, which he called "gruks" ("grooks" in English), and began publishing them in the daily newspaper "Politiken" under the pseudonym "Kumbel Kumbell" (Note: "Here is the reason why: Piet is the Dutch form of the name Peter or Petrus, which means rock, stone, and Hein is a way of spelling 'hen', the old Danish word for a whetstone. 'Kumbel', or 'kumbl' as it strictly speaking should be written, also means stone, though more a grave monument. In other words, Piet Hein, or Stone Stone can, in a way, be translated by Kumbel Kumbel. He originally wrote the second word with two Ls, also later the signature became just Kumbel – the name he is at least as well known by as his own.").

== Grooks in English ==
Beginning in the 1960s, seven volumes of English translations of 53 grooks each (all translated by Jens Arup) were published and became popular in the U.S. counterculture of the time:

- Grooks (1966)
- Grooks 2 (1968)
- Grooks 3 (1970)
- Grooks 4 (1972)
- Grooks 5 (1973)
- Grooks VI (1978)
- Grooks VII (1984)

As of 2024, Piet Hein and/or his estate have also published the following books of grooks:

- Collected Grooks I (2002)
- Collected Grooks II (2002)
- Runaway Runes: Short Grooks I
- Viking Vistas: Short Grooks II
