= Superegg =

Special type of superellipsoid

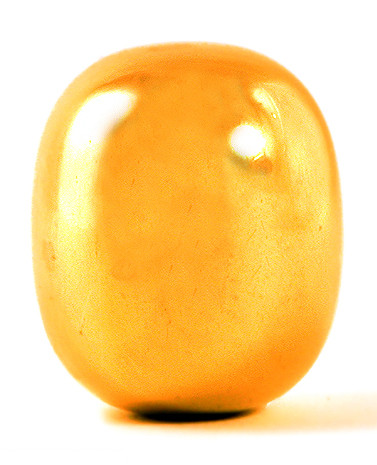
Brass superegg by Piet Hein.

Piet Hein Superegg

In geometry, a superegg is a solid of revolution obtained by rotating an elongated superellipse with exponent greater than 2 around its longest axis. It is a special case of superellipsoid.

Unlike an elongated ellipsoid, an elongated superegg can stand upright on a flat surface, or on top of another superegg. This is due to its curvature being zero at the tips. The shape was popularized by Danish poet and scientist Piet Hein (1905–1996). Supereggs of various materials, including brass, were sold as novelties or "executive toys" in the 1960s.

== Mathematical description ==
The superegg is a superellipsoid whose horizontal cross-sections are circles. It is defined by the inequality

$$\left|\frac{\sqrt{x^2 + y^2}}{R}\right|^p + \left|\frac{z}{h}\right|^p \leq 1 \, ,$$

where R is the horizontal radius at the "equator" (the widest part as defined by the circles), and h is one half of the height. The exponent p determines the degree of flattening at the tips and equator. Hein's choice was p = 2.5 (the same one he used for the Sergels Torg roundabout), and R/h = 6/5.

The definition can be changed to have an equality rather than an inequality; this changes the superegg to being a surface of revolution rather than a solid.

== Volume ==
The volume of a superegg can be derived via squigonometry, a generalization of trigonometry to squircles. It is related to the gamma function:

$V = \frac{4\pi hR^2}{3p}\frac{\Gamma(1/p) \Gamma(2/p)}{\Gamma(3/p)} \, .$

== See also ==
- Egg of Columbus
