= Piet Hein (scientist) =

Danish polymath (1905–1996)

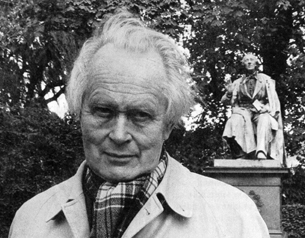
- Piet Hein (Kumbel) in front of the H.C. Andersen statue in Kongens Have, Copenhagen, 1983
- Born: 16 December 1905; Copenhagen, Denmark
- Died: 17 April 1996 (aged 90); Funen, Denmark
- Known for: Puzzles, poems

Piet Hein (16 December 1905 – 17 April 1996) was a Danish polymath (mathematician, inventor, designer, writer and poet), often writing under the Old Norse pseudonym Kumbel, meaning "tombstone". His short poems, known as gruks or grooks (Danish: gruk), first appeared in the daily newspaper Politiken shortly after the German occupation of Denmark in April 1940 under the pseudonym "Kumbel Kumbell". He also invented many games, including the Soma cube and the board game Hex.

== Biography ==
Hein, a direct descendant of Piet Pieterszoon Hein, the 17th century Dutch admiral, was born in Copenhagen, Denmark. He studied at the Institute for Theoretical Physics (later named the Niels Bohr Institute) of the University of Copenhagen, and Technical University of Denmark. Yale awarded him an honorary doctorate in 1972. He died in his home on Funen, Denmark in 1996.

== Resistance ==
Piet Hein, who, in his own words, "played mental ping-pong" with Niels Bohr in the inter-War period, found himself confronted with a dilemma when the Germans occupied Denmark. He felt that he had three choices: Do nothing, flee to neutral Sweden or join the Danish resistance movement. As he explained in 1968, "Sweden was out because I am not Swedish, but Danish. I could not remain at home because, if I had, every knock at the door would have sent shivers up my spine. So, I joined the Resistance."

Taking as his first weapon the instrument with which he was most familiar, the pen, he wrote and had published his first "grook" (Danish: gruk). It passed the censors who did not grasp its real meaning. The Consolation Grook reads:

CONSOLATION GROOK

Losing one glove
is certainly painful,
but nothing
compared to the pain,
of losing one,
throwing away the other,
and finding
the first one again.

The Danes, however, understood its importance and soon it was found as graffiti all around the country. The deeper meaning of the grook was that even if you lose your freedom ("losing one glove"), do not lose your patriotism and self-respect by collaborating with the Nazis ("throwing away the other"), because that sense of having betrayed your country will be more painful when freedom has been found again someday.

One of Hein's best-known grooks is A Maxim for Vikings, alluding to the Nietzsche aphorism:

A MAXIM FOR VIKINGS

Here is a fact
that should help you fight
a bit longer:
Things that don't act-
ually kill you outright
make you stronger.

== Recreational mathematics ==
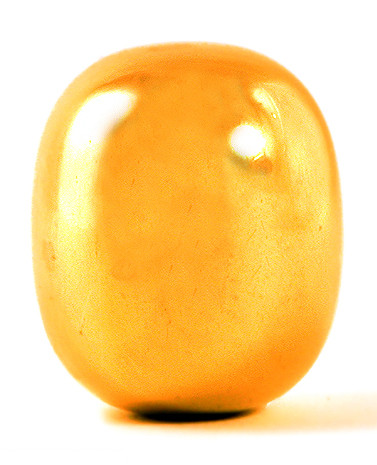
Piet Hein's superegg in brass

In 1959, city planners in Stockholm, Sweden announced a design challenge for a roundabout in their city square Sergels Torg. Piet Hein's winning proposal was based on a superellipse. He went on to use the superellipse in the design of furniture and other artifacts. He also invented a perpetual calendar called the Astro Calendar and marketed housewares based on the superellipse and its three-dimensional analog, the superegg.

He invented the Soma cube and devised the games of Hex, Tangloids, Tower, Polytaire, TacTix, Nimbi, Qrazy Qube, and Pyramystery.

Hein was a close associate of Martin Gardner and his work was frequently featured in Gardner's Mathematical Games column in Scientific American. (Note: The game of Hex (July 1957), the Soma cube (Sep 1958), the game of Tangloids (Dec 1959), and The Superellipse (Sep 1965)) At the age of 95, Gardner wrote his autobiography and titled it Undiluted Hocus-Pocus. Both the title and the dedication of this book come from one of Hein's grooks.

== See also ==
- Flipism

== Personal ==
Piet Hein was married four times and had five sons from his last three marriages.

1. (1937) married Gunver Holck, divorced
2. (1942) married Gerda Ruth (Nena) Cohnheim, divorced
  Sons: Jan Alvaro Hein, born 9 January 1943; Anders Humberto Hein, born 30 December 1943
3. (1947) married Anne Cathrina (Trine) Krøyer Pedersen, divorced
  Son: Lars Hein, born 20 May 1950
4. (1955) married Gerd Ericsson, who died 3 November 1968
  Sons: Jotun Hein, born 19 July 1956; Hugo Piet Hein, born 16 November 1963

== Bibliography ==
- Grooks – 20 volumes, originally published between 1940 and 1963, all currently out-of-print.
- Grooks (1966)
- Grooks 2 (1968)
- Grooks 3 (1970)
- Grooks 4 (1972)
- Grooks 5 (1973)
- Grooks 6 (1978)
- Grooks 7 (1984)

The following books of grooks are available on this subpage of the website "Piet Hein".

- Collected Grooks I
- Collected Grooks II
- Runaway Runes: Short Grooks I
- Viking Vistas: Short Grooks II

== Other References ==
- Gardner, Martin: Piet Hein's Superellipse. – in Gardner, Martin: Mathematical Carnival. A New Round-Up of Tantalizers and Puzzles from Scientific American. New York: Vintage, 1977, pp. 240–254.
- Johan Gielis: Inventing the circle. The geometry of nature. – Antwerpen : Geniaal Press, 2003. – ISBN 90-807756-1-4
- "A Poet with a Slide Rule: Piet Hein Bestrides Art and Science," by Jim Hicks, Life Magazine, Vol. 61 No. 16, 10/14/66, pp. 55–66
- "Piet Hein Biographical Details", by Nils Aas, tr. by Roger Stevenson. The Papers of the Medford Educational Institute 3.
- "To and by Piet Hein on the Occasion of Piet Hein's Election as the Student Organization's Twelfth Honorary Member", tr. by Roger Stevenson. The Papers of the Medford Educational Institute 2.
