= Superellipse =

Family of closed mathematical curves

Examples of superellipses for a = 1, b = 0.75.

A superellipse, also known as a Lamé curve after Gabriel Lamé, is a closed curve resembling the ellipse, retaining the geometric features of semi-major axis and semi-minor axis, and symmetry about them, but defined by an equation that allows for various shapes between a rectangle and an ellipse.

In two dimensional Cartesian coordinate system, a superellipse is defined as the set of all points (x, y) on the curve that satisfy the equation
$$\left|\frac{x}{a}\right|^n\!\! + \left|\frac{y}{b}\right|^n\! = 1,$$
where a and b are positive numbers referred to as semi-diameters or semi-axes of the superellipse, and n is a positive parameter that defines the shape. When n = 2, the superellipse is an ordinary ellipse. For n > 2, the shape is more rectangular with rounded corners, and for 0 < n < 2, it is more pointed.

In the polar coordinate system, the superellipse equation is (the set of all points (r, θ) on the curve satisfy the equation):
$$r = \left(\left|\frac{\cos\theta}{a}\right|^n\!\! + \left|\frac{\sin\theta}{b}\right|^n\!\right)^{-\frac1n}\!.$$

== Specific cases ==
This formula defines a closed curve contained in the rectangle −a ≤ x ≤ +a and −b ≤ y ≤ +b. The parameters a and b are the semi-diameters or semi-axes of the curve. The overall shape of the curve is determined by the value of the exponent n, as shown in the following table:

0 < n < 1	The superellipse looks like a four-armed star with concave (inwards-curved) sides. For n = 1/2, in particular, each of the four arcs is a segment of a parabola. An astroid is the special case a = b, n = 2/3	The superellipse with n = 1/2, a = b = 1
n = 1	The curve is a rhombus with corners (±a, 0) and (0, ±b).	
1 < n < 2	The curve looks like a rhombus with the same corners but with convex (outwards-curved) sides. The curvature increases without limit as one approaches its extreme points.	The superellipse with n = 3/2, a = b = 1
n = 2	The curve is an ordinary ellipse (in particular, a circle if a = b).	
n > 2	The curve looks superficially like a rectangle with rounded corners. The curvature is zero at the points (±a, 0) and (0, ±b).	Squircle, the superellipse with n = 4, a = b = 1

CSS defines a function superellipse(K) where n = 2^{K}, such that cases with K < 0 are concave, K = 0 defines a rhombus, K > 0 are convex, and K = 1 defines an ellipse.

If n < 2, the figure is also called a hypoellipse; if n > 2, a hyperellipse. When n ≥ 1 and a = b, the superellipse is the boundary of a ball of ℝ^{2} in the n-norm. The extreme points of the superellipse are (±a, 0) and (0, ±b), and its four "corners" are (±s_{a}, ±s_{b}), where s = 2^{−1/n} (sometimes called the "superness").

== Mathematical properties ==
When n is a positive rational number p/q (in lowest terms), then each quadrant of the superellipse is a plane algebraic curve of order p/q. In particular, when a = b = 1 and n is an even integer, then it is a Fermat curve of degree n. In that case it is non-singular, but in general it will be singular. If the numerator is not even, then the curve is pieced together from portions of the same algebraic curve in different orientations.

The curve is given by the parametric equations (with parameter t having no elementary geometric interpretation)
$$\left.
\begin{align}
x\left(t\right) &= \plusmn a\cos^{\frac{2}{n}} t \\
y\left(t\right) &= \plusmn b\sin^{\frac{2}{n}} t
\end{align} \right\} \qquad 0 \le t \le \frac{\pi}{2}$$
where each ± can be chosen separately so that each value of t gives four points on the curve. Equivalently, letting t range over 0 ≤ t < 2π,
$$\begin{align}
x\left(t\right) &= {\left|\cos t\right|}^{\frac{2}{n}} \cdot a \sgn(\cos t) \\
y\left(t\right) &= {\left|\sin t\right|}^{\frac{2}{n}} \cdot b \sgn(\sin t)
\end{align}$$
where the sign function is
$$\sgn(w) = \begin{cases}
-1, & w < 0 \\
0, & w = 0 \\
+1, & w > 0 .
\end{cases}$$
Here t is not the angle between the positive horizontal axis and the ray from the origin to the point, since the tangent of this angle equals y/x while in the parametric expressions
$$\frac{y}{x} = \frac{b}{a} (\tan t)^\frac2n \neq \tan t.$$

=== Area ===
The area inside the superellipse can be expressed in terms of the gamma function as
$$\text{Area} = 4 a b \frac{\left(\Gamma \left(1+\frac{1}{n}\right)\right)^2}{\Gamma \left(1+\frac{2}{n}\right)} ,$$
or in terms of the beta function as
$$\text{Area} = \frac{4 a b}{n} \Beta\!\left(\frac{1}{n},\frac{1}{n}+1\right) .$$
An alternative formula for area is

$$\text{Area} = 2^{1-\frac{2}{n}}\varpi_n a b,$$

where $\varpi_n=2\int_0^1\frac{dr}{\sqrt{1-r^n}}$ is the arc length of the principal loop of the sinusoidal spiral $r^{\frac{n}{2}}=\cos\left(\frac{n}{2}\theta\right)$.

=== Perimeter ===
The perimeter of a general superellipse, like that of an ellipse, cannot be expressed in terms of elementary functions. Exact solutions for the perimeter of a superellipse exist using infinite summations; these could be truncated to obtain approximate solutions. Numerical integration is another option to obtain perimeter estimates at arbitrary precision.

A closed-form approximation obtained via symbolic regression is also an option that balances parsimony and accuracy. Consider a superellipse centered on the origin of a two-dimensional plane. Now, imagine that the superellipse (with shape parameter n) is stretched such that the first quadrant (where x > 0, y > 0) is an arc from (1, 0) to (0, h), with h ≥ 1. Then, the arc length of the superellipse within that single quadrant is approximated as the following function of h and n:

h + (((((n - 0.88487077) * h + 0.2588574 / h) ^ exp(n / -0.90069205)) + h) + 0.09919785) ^ (-1.4812293 / n)

This single-quadrant arc length approximation is accurate to within ±0.2% for across all values of n, and can be used to efficiently estimate the total perimeter of a superellipse.

=== Pedal curve ===
The pedal curve is relatively straightforward to compute. Specifically, the pedal of
$$\left|\frac{x}{a}\right|^n\! + \left|\frac{y}{b}\right|^n\! = 1,$$
is given in polar coordinates by

$$\left(a \cos \theta\right)^{\frac{n}{n-1}}+\left(b \sin \theta\right)^{\tfrac{n}{n-1}}=r^{\frac{n}{n-1}}.$$

== Generalizations ==
The generalization of these shapes can involve several approaches. The generalizations of the superellipse in higher dimensions retain the fundamental mathematical structure of the superellipse while adapting it to different contexts and applications.

=== Higher dimensions ===
The generalizations of the superellipse in higher dimensions retain the fundamental mathematical structure of the superellipse while adapting it to different contexts and applications.

- A superellipsoid extends the superellipse into three dimensions, creating shapes that vary between ellipsoids and rectangular solids with rounded edges. The superellipsoid is defined as the set of all points (x, y, z) that satisfy the equation

$$\left|\frac{x}{a}\right|^n\!\! + \left|\frac{y}{b}\right|^n\! + \left|\frac{z}{c}\right|^n\! = 1$$
where a, b and c are positive numbers referred to as the semi-axes of the superellipsoid, and n is a positive parameter that defines the shape.

- A hyperellipsoid is the d-dimensional analogue of an ellipsoid (and by extension, a superellipsoid). It is defined as the set of all points (x_{1}, x_{2}, …, x_{d}) that satisfy the equation

$$\left|\frac{x_1}{a_1}\right|^n\!\! + \left|\frac{x_2}{a_2}\right|^n\! +\cdots+ \left|\frac{x_d}{a_d}\right|^n\! = 1$$
where a_{1}, a_{2}, …, a_{d} are positive numbers referred to as the semi-axes of the hyperellipsoid, and n is a positive parameter that defines the shape.

=== Different exponents ===
Variations of a superellipse with different exponents

Using different exponents for each term in the equation, allowing more flexibility in shape formation.

For the two-dimensional case the equation is
$$\left|\frac{x}{a}\right|^m\!\! + \left|\frac{y}{b}\right|^n\! = 1 \quad m,n>0$$
where m either equals or differs from n. If m = n, it is Lamé's superellipse. If m ≠ n, the curve possesses more flexibility of behavior, and is a better possible fit to describe some experimental information.

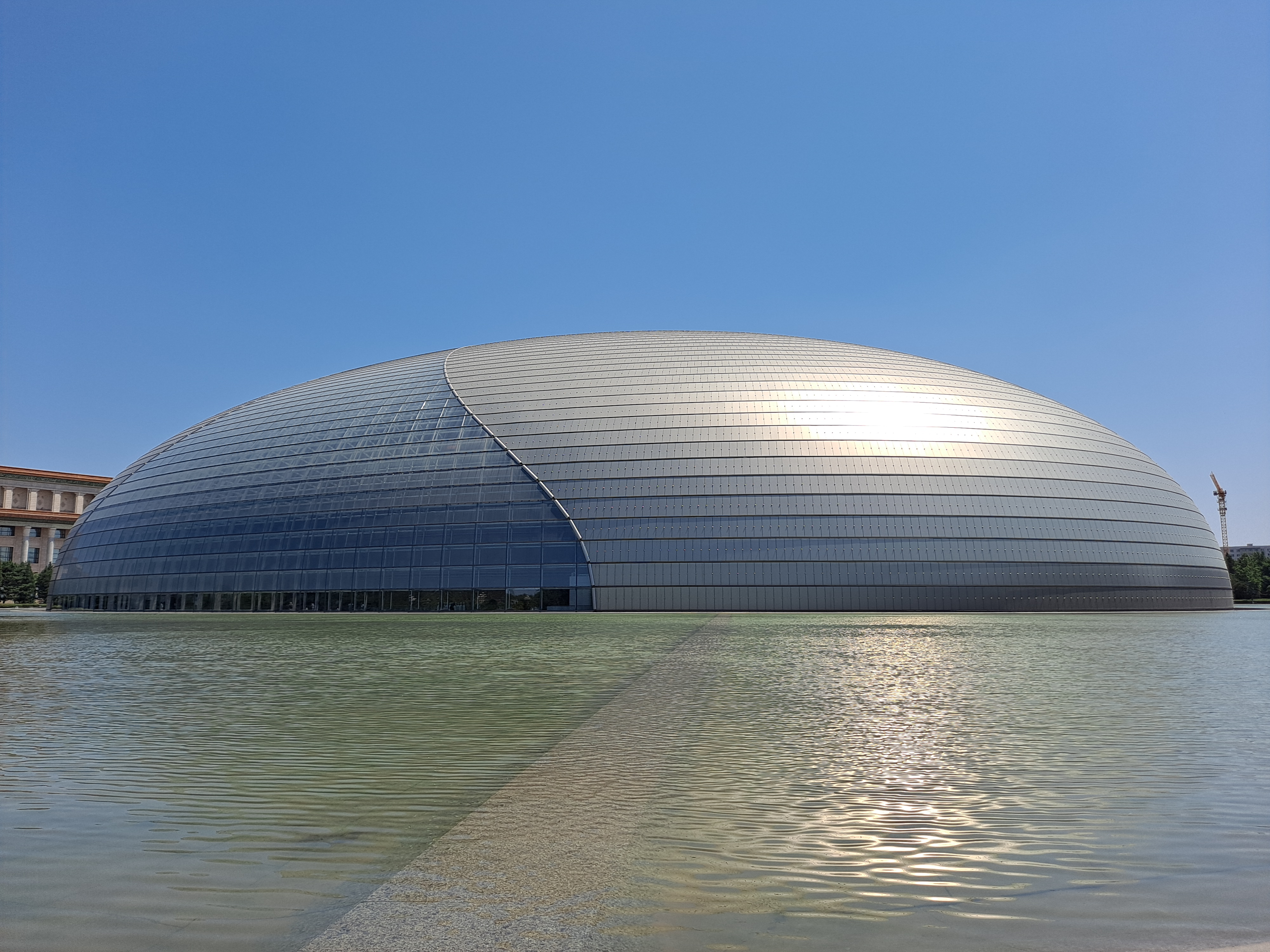
National Centre for the Performing Arts

For the three-dimensional case, three different positive powers m, n and p can be used in the equation
$$\left|\frac{x}{a}\right|^m\!\! + \left|\frac{y}{b}\right|^n\! + \left|\frac{z}{c}\right|^p\! = 1.$$
If m = n = p, a superellipsoid is obtained. If any two or all three powers differ from each other, a solid is obtained that may possess more flexibility in representing real structural data than the super ellipsoid. A three-dimensional superellipsoid with m = n = 2.2, p = 2.4 and the semi-axes a = b = 1, c = 0.5 represents the structure of the National Centre for the Performing Arts in China.

In the general N-dimensional case, the equation is
$$\left|\frac{x_1}{a_1}\right|^{n_1}\!\! + \left|\frac{x_2}{a_2}\right|^{n_2}\! +\cdots+ \left|\frac{x_N}{a_N}\right|^{n_N}\! = 1$$
where in general, n_{1}, n_{2}, …, n_{N} may differ from each other. It is the hyperellipsoid only if all n_{i} are equal.

=== Related shapes ===
Superquadrics are a family of shapes that include superellipsoids as a special case. They are used in computer graphics and geometric modeling to create complex, smooth shapes with easily adjustable parameters. While not a direct generalization of superellipses, hyperspheres also share the concept of extending geometric shapes into higher dimensions. These related shapes demonstrate the versatility and broad applicability of the fundamental principles underlying superellipses.

=== Anisotropic scaling ===
Anisotropic scaling involves scaling the shape differently along different axes, providing additional control over the geometry. This approach can be applied to superellipses, superellipsoids, and their higher-dimensional analogues to produce a wider variety of forms and better fit specific requirements in applications such as computer graphics, structural design, and data visualization. For instance, anisotropic scaling allows the creation of shapes that can model real-world objects more accurately by adjusting the proportions along each axis independently.

== History ==
The general Cartesian notation of the form comes from the French mathematician Gabriel Lamé (1795–1870), who generalized the equation for the ellipse.

The outer outlines of the letters 'o' and 'O' in Zapf's Melior typeface are described by superellipses with n = log(2)/(log(9) − log(7)) ≈ 2.758

Hermann Zapf's typeface Melior, published in 1952, uses superellipses for letters such as o. Thirty years later Donald Knuth would build the ability to choose between true ellipses and superellipses (both approximated by cubic splines) into his Computer Modern type family.

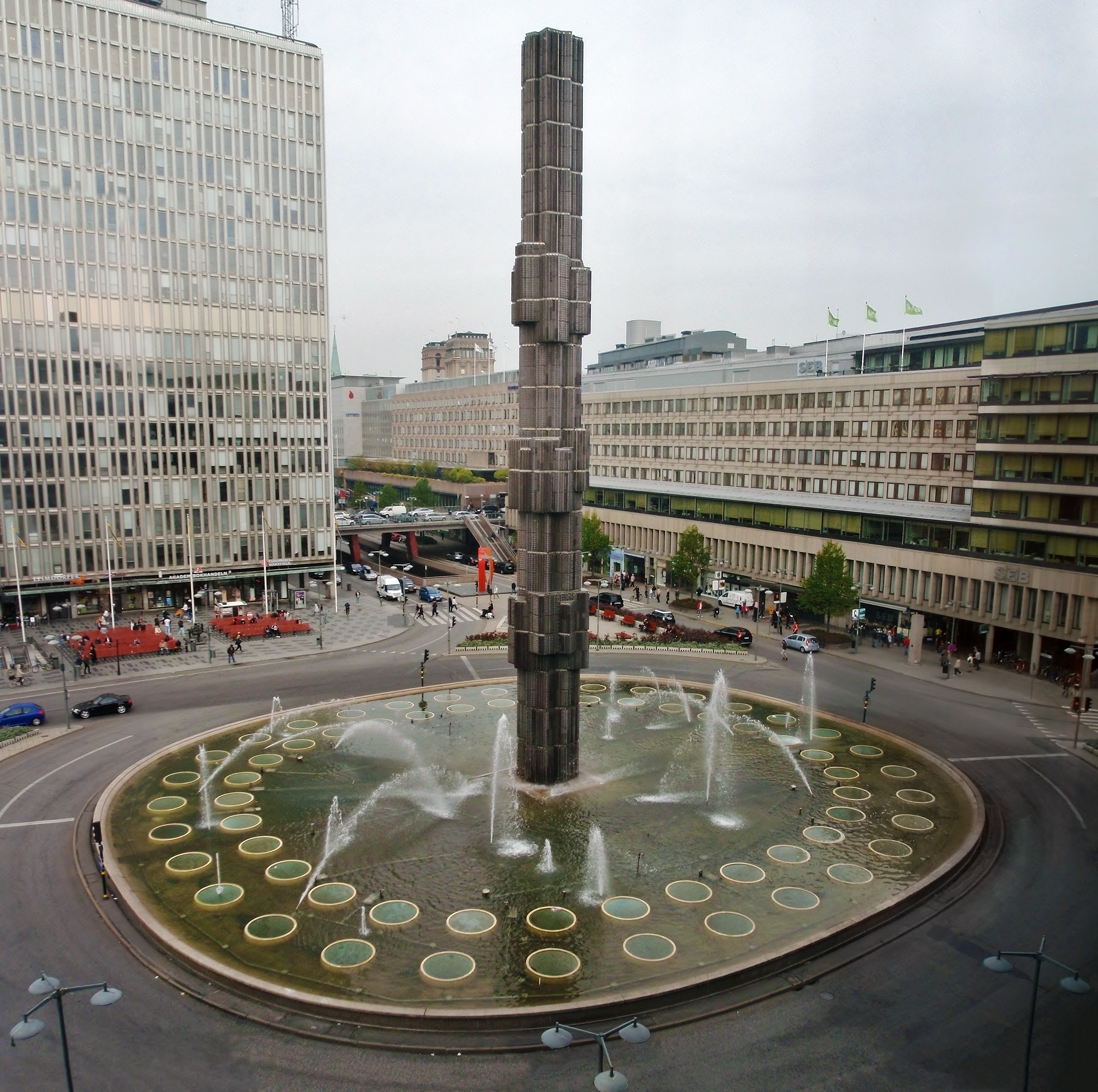
The central fountain of Sergels Torg is outlined by a superellipse with n = 2.5 and a/b = 6/5.

The superellipse was named by the Danish poet and scientist Piet Hein (1905–1996) though he did not discover it as it is sometimes claimed. In 1959, city planners in Stockholm, Sweden announced a design challenge for a roundabout in their city square Sergels Torg. Piet Hein's winning proposal was based on a superellipse with n = 2.5 and a/b = 6/5. As he explained it:

Man is the animal that draws lines which he himself then stumbles over. In the whole pattern of civilization there have been two tendencies, one toward straight lines and rectangular patterns and one toward circular lines. There are reasons, mechanical and psychological, for both tendencies. Things made with straight lines fit well together and save space. And we can move easily—physically or mentally—around things made with round lines. But we are in a straitjacket, having to accept one or the other, when often some intermediate form would be better. To draw something freehand—such as the patchwork traffic circle they tried in Stockholm—will not do. It isn't fixed, isn't definite like a circle or square. You don't know what it is. It isn't esthetically satisfying. The super-ellipse solved the problem. It is neither round nor rectangular, but in between. Yet it is fixed, it is definite—it has a unity.

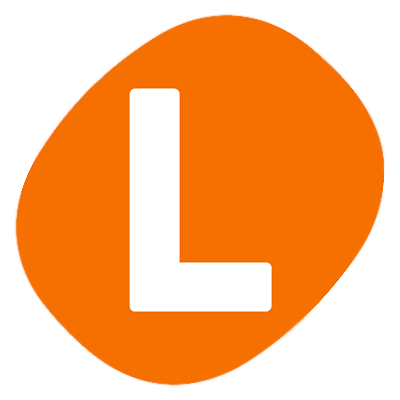
The Local's logo, based on Stockholm's Sergels Torg, with the L representing the glass obelisk

Sergels Torg was completed in 1967. Meanwhile, Piet Hein went on to use the superellipse in other artifacts, such as beds, dishes, tables, etc. By rotating a superellipse around the longest axis, he created the superegg, a solid egg-like shape that could stand upright on a flat surface, and was marketed as a novelty toy.

In 1968, when negotiators in Paris for the Vietnam War could not agree on the shape of the negotiating table, Balinski, Kieron Underwood and Holt suggested a superelliptical table in a letter to The New York Times. The superellipse was used for the shape of the 1968 Azteca Olympic Stadium, in Mexico City.

The second floor of the original World Trade Center in New York City consisted of a large, superellipse-shaped overhanging balcony.

Waldo R. Tobler developed a map projection, the Tobler hyperelliptical projection, published in 1973, in which the meridians are arcs of superellipses.

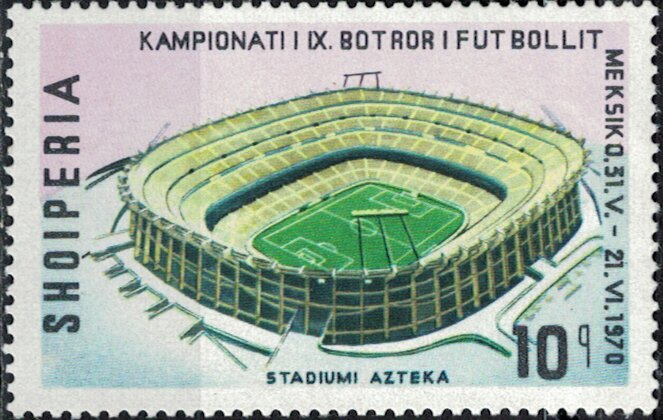
Estadio Azteca in Mexico

The logo for news company The Local consists of a tilted superellipse matching the proportions of Sergels Torg. Three connected superellipses are used in the logo of the Pittsburgh Steelers.

In computing, mobile operating system iOS uses a superellipse curve for app icons, replacing the rounded corners style used up to version 6.

== See also ==
- Astroid, the superellipse with n = 2/3 and a = b, is a hypocycloid with four cusps.
  - Deltoid curve, the hypocycloid of three cusps.
- Squircle, the superellipse with n = 4 and a = b, looks like "The Four-Cornered Wheel."
  - Reuleaux triangle, "The Three-Cornered Wheel."
- Superformula, a generalization of the superellipse.
- Superquadrics: superellipsoids and supertoroids, the three-dimensional "relatives" of superellipses.
- Superelliptic curve, equation of the form Y^{n} = f(X).
- L^{p} spaces
