= History of Portland, Oregon =

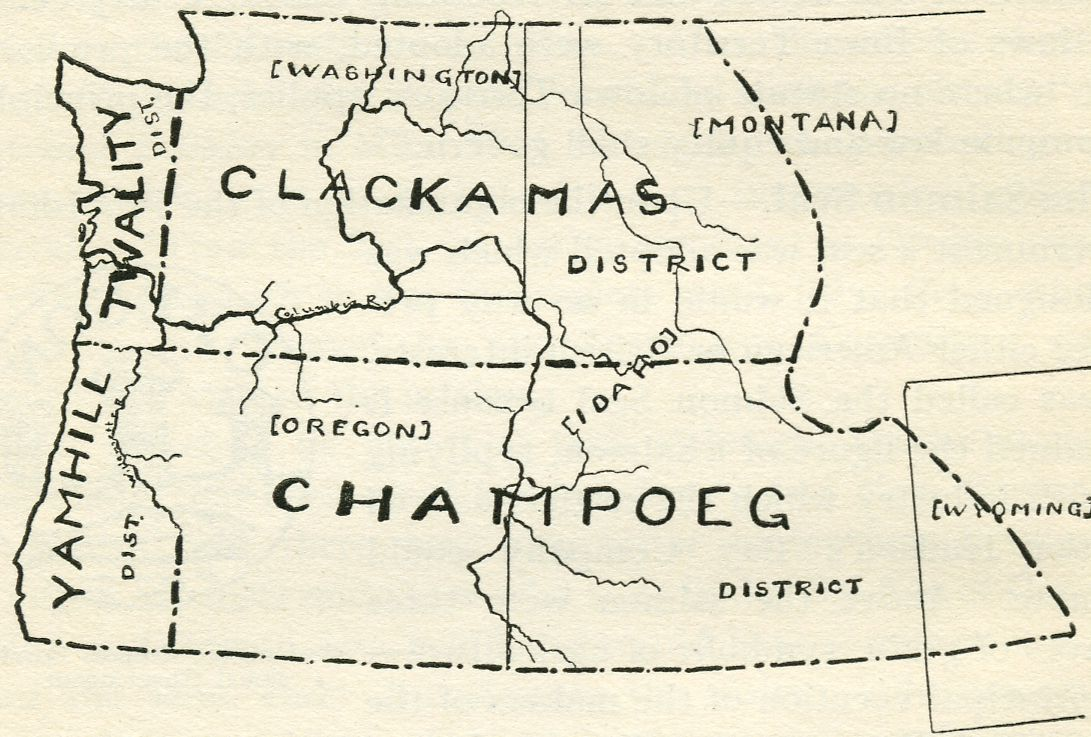
Provisional Government of Oregon district boundaries drawn in 1843, showing eventual U.S. border and states.

The history of the city of Portland, Oregon, began in 1843 when business partners William Overton and Asa Lovejoy filed to claim land on the west bank of the Willamette River in Oregon Country. In 1845 the name of Portland was chosen for this community by coin toss. February 8, 1851, the city was incorporated. Portland has continued to grow in size and population, with the 2010 census showing 583,776 residents in the city.

== Early history ==
The land today occupied by Multnomah County, Oregon, was inhabited for centuries by two bands of Upper Chinook Indians. The Multnomah people settled on and around Sauvie Island and the Cascades Indians settled along the Columbia Gorge. These groups fished and traded along the river and gathered berries, wapato and other root vegetables. The nearby Tualatin Plains provided prime hunting grounds. Eventually, contact with Europeans resulted in the decimation of native tribes by smallpox and malaria.

== Founding ==
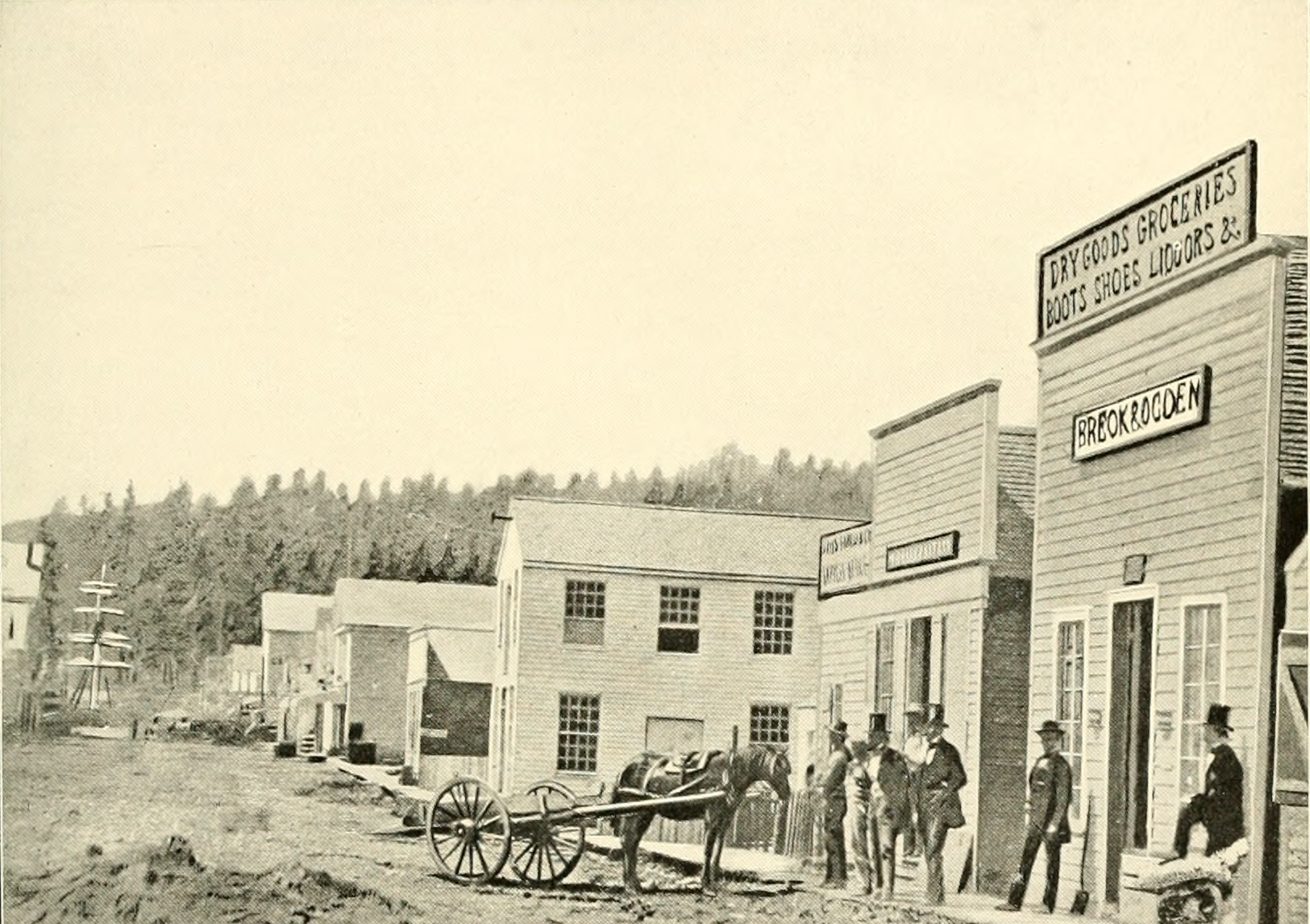
Portland in 1853

The site of the future city of Portland, Oregon, was known to American, Canadian, and British traders, trappers and settlers of the 1830s and early 1840s as "The Clearing," a small stopping place along the west bank of the Willamette River used by travelers en route between Oregon City and Fort Vancouver. As early as 1840, Massachusetts sea captain John Couch logged an encouraging assessment of the river's depth adjacent to The Clearing, noting its promise of accommodating large ocean-going vessels, which could not ordinarily travel up-river as far as Oregon City, the largest Oregon settlement at the time. In 1843, Tennessee pioneer William Overton and Boston, Massachusetts lawyer Asa Lovejoy filed a 640 acres (260 ha) land claim with Oregon's provisional government that encompassed The Clearing and nearby waterfront and timber land. Legend has it that Overton had prior rights to the land but lacked funds, so he agreed to split the claim with Lovejoy, who paid the 25-cent filing fee.

Asa Lovejoy

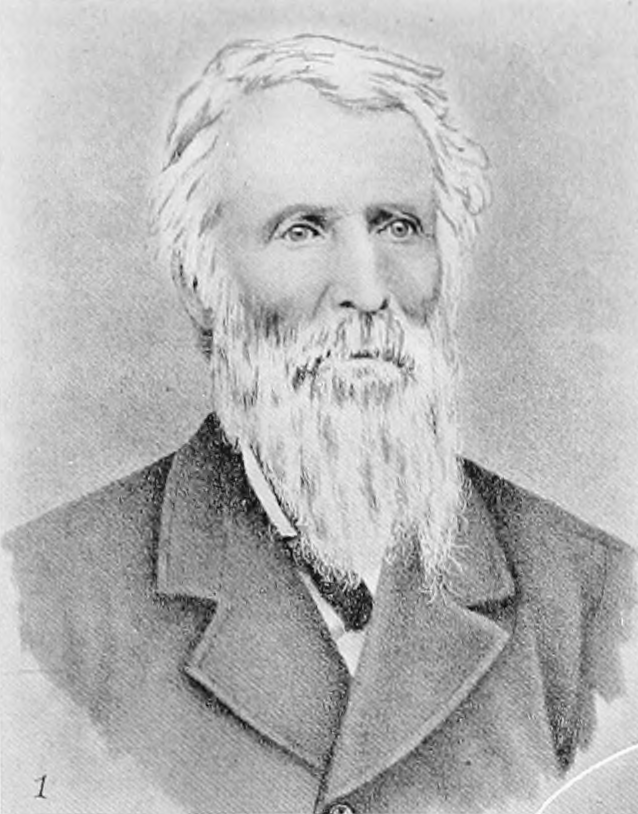
Francis Pettygrove

Attorney Asa Lovejoy and merchant Francis Pettygrove are considered the city's founders.

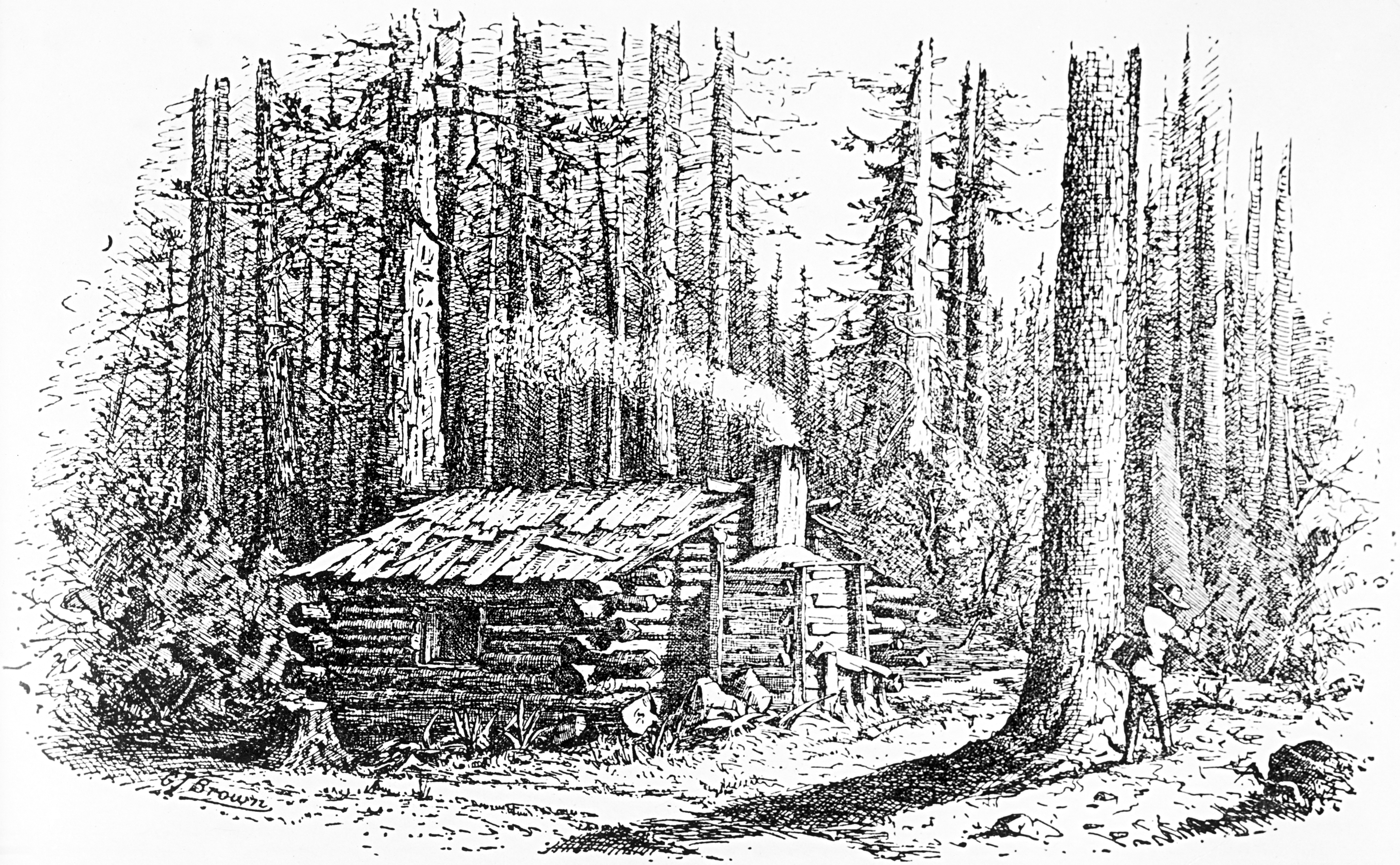
Lovejoy and Pettygrove built Portland's first house, a log cabin near the present intersection of Washington Street and Naito Parkway, in 1844.

Bored with clearing trees and building roads, Overton sold his half of the claim to Francis W. Pettygrove of Portland, Maine, in 1845. When it came time to name their new town, Pettygrove and Lovejoy both had the same idea: to name it after his home town. They flipped a coin to decide, and Pettygrove won. On November 1, 1846, Lovejoy sold his half of the land claim to Benjamin Stark, as well as his half-interest in a herd of cattle for $1,215.

Three years later, Pettygrove had lost interest in Portland and become enamored with the California Gold Rush. On September 22, 1848, he sold the entire townsite, save only for 64 sold lots and two blocks each for himself and Stark, to Daniel H. Lownsdale, a tanner. Although Stark owned fully half of the townsite, Pettygrove "largely ignor[ed] Stark's interest", in part because Stark was on the east coast with no immediate plans to return to Oregon. Lownsdale paid for the site with $5,000 in leather, which Pettygrove presumably resold in San Francisco for a large profit.

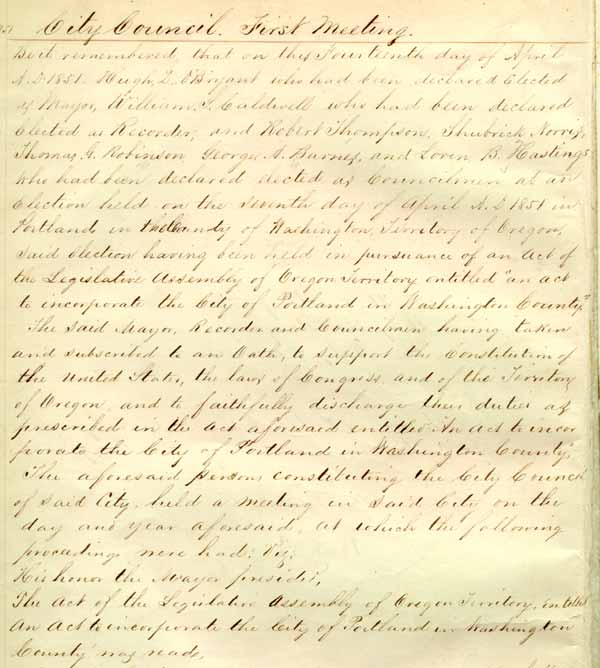
Minutes of the first meeting of the city council, 1851

On March 30, 1849, Lownsdale split the Portland claim with Stephen Coffin, who paid $6,000 for his half. By August 1849, Captain John Couch and Stark were pressuring Lownsdale and Coffin for Stark's half of the claim; Stark had been absent, but was using the claim as equity in an East Coast-California shipping business with the Sherman Brothers of New York.

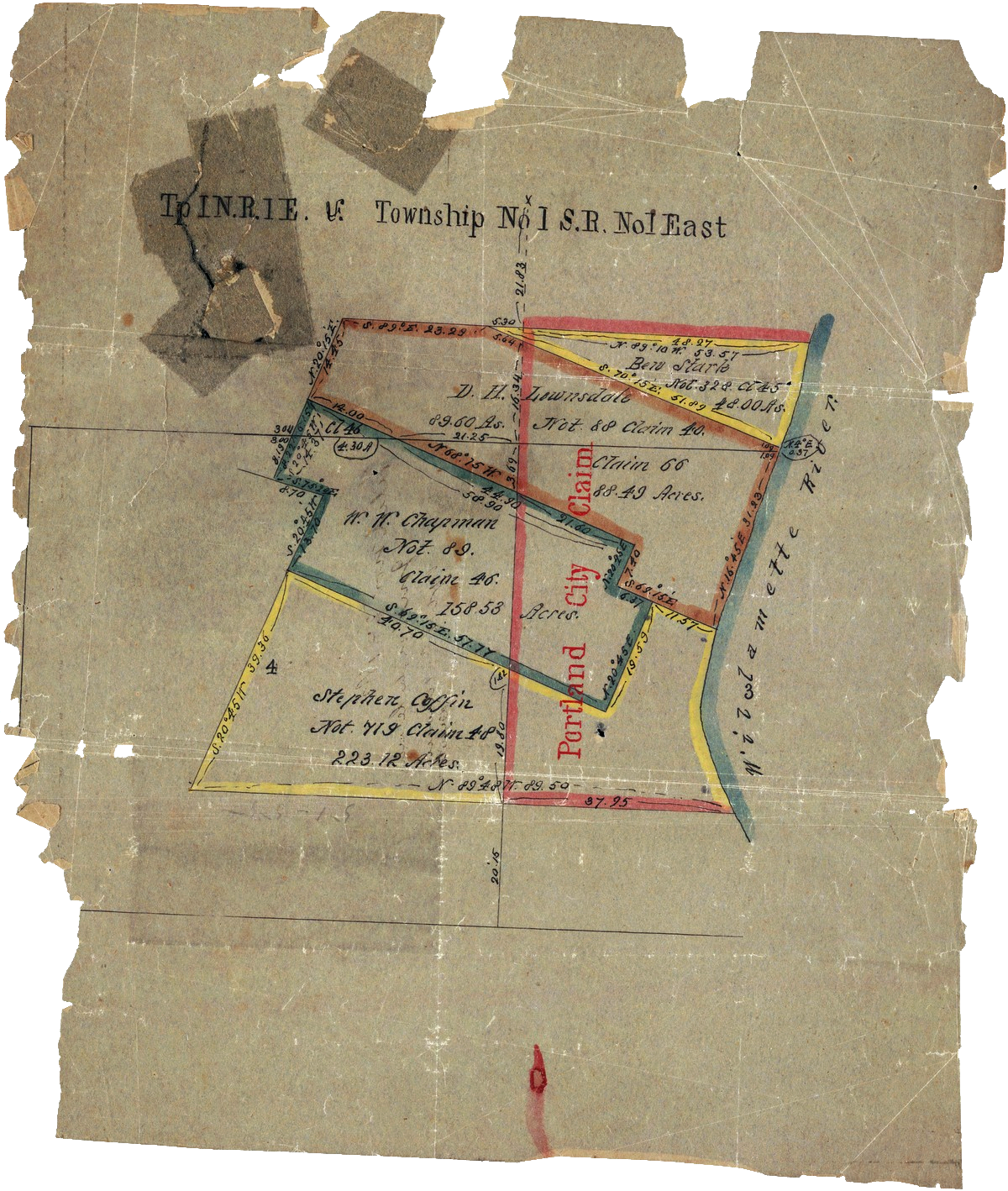
Plat of Portland, 1850s

In December 1849, William W. Chapman bought what he believed was a third of the overall claim for $26,666, plus his provision of free legal services for the partnership. In January 1850, Lownsdale had to travel to San Francisco to negotiate on the land claim with Stark, leaving Chapman with power of attorney. Stark and Lownsdale came to an agreement on March 1, 1850, which gave to Stark the land north of Stark Street and about $3,000 from land already sold in this area. This settlement reduced the size of Chapman's claim by approximately 10%. Lownsdale returned to Portland in April 1850, where the terms were presented to an unwilling Chapman and Coffin, but who agreed after negotiations with Couch. While Lownsdale was gone, Chapman had given himself block 81 on the waterfront and sold all of the lots on it, and this block was included in the Stark settlement area. Couch's negotiations excluded this property from Stark's claim, allowing Chapman to retain the profits on the lot.

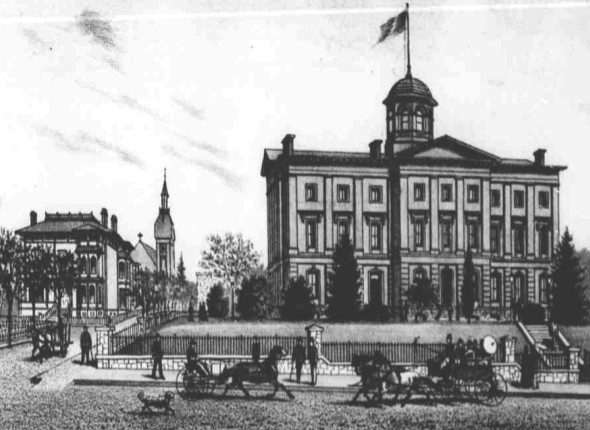
Pioneer Courthouse. Built in 1869 and still used today, it is the oldest federal building west of the Mississippi River.

Portland existed in the shadow of Oregon City, the territorial capital 12 miles (19 km) upstream at Willamette Falls. However, Portland's location at the Willamette's confluence with the Columbia River, accessible to deep-draft vessels, gave it a key advantage over the older pier. It also triumphed over early rivals such as Milwaukie and Linnton. In its first census in 1850, the city's population was 821 and, like many frontier towns, was predominantly male, with 653 male whites, 164 female whites and four "free colored" individuals. It was already the largest settlement in the Pacific Northwest, and while it could boast about its trading houses, hotels and even a newspaper—the Weekly Oregonian—it was still very much a frontier village, derided by outsiders as "Stumptown" and "Mudtown." It was a place where "stumps from fallen firs lay scattered dangerously about Front and First Streets ... humans and animals, carts and wagons slogged through a sludge of mud and water ... sidewalks often disappeared during spring floods."

In 1850, construction of a multi-purpose "school and meeting house" was completed, a building which served as a church, schoolhouse, courthouse, and place for public meetings. This was Portland's first schoolhouse; by 1873 Portland boasted "twenty public and private schools and academies of a high order, and nearly the same number of churches."

The first firefighting service was established in the early 1850s, with the volunteer Pioneer Fire Engine Company. In 1854, the city council voted to form the Portland Fire Department, and following an 1857 reorganization it encompassed three engine companies and 157 volunteer firemen.

== Late 19th century ==
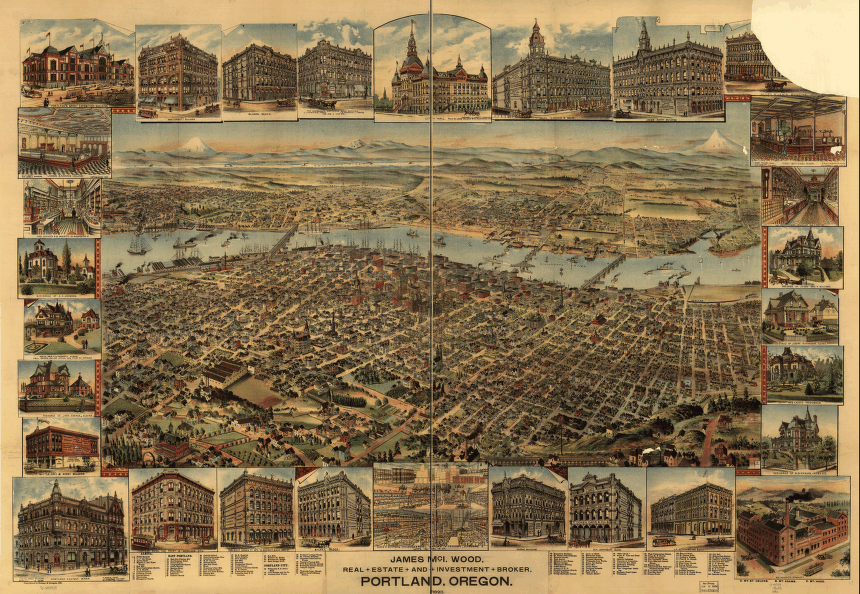
Map of Portland in 1890.

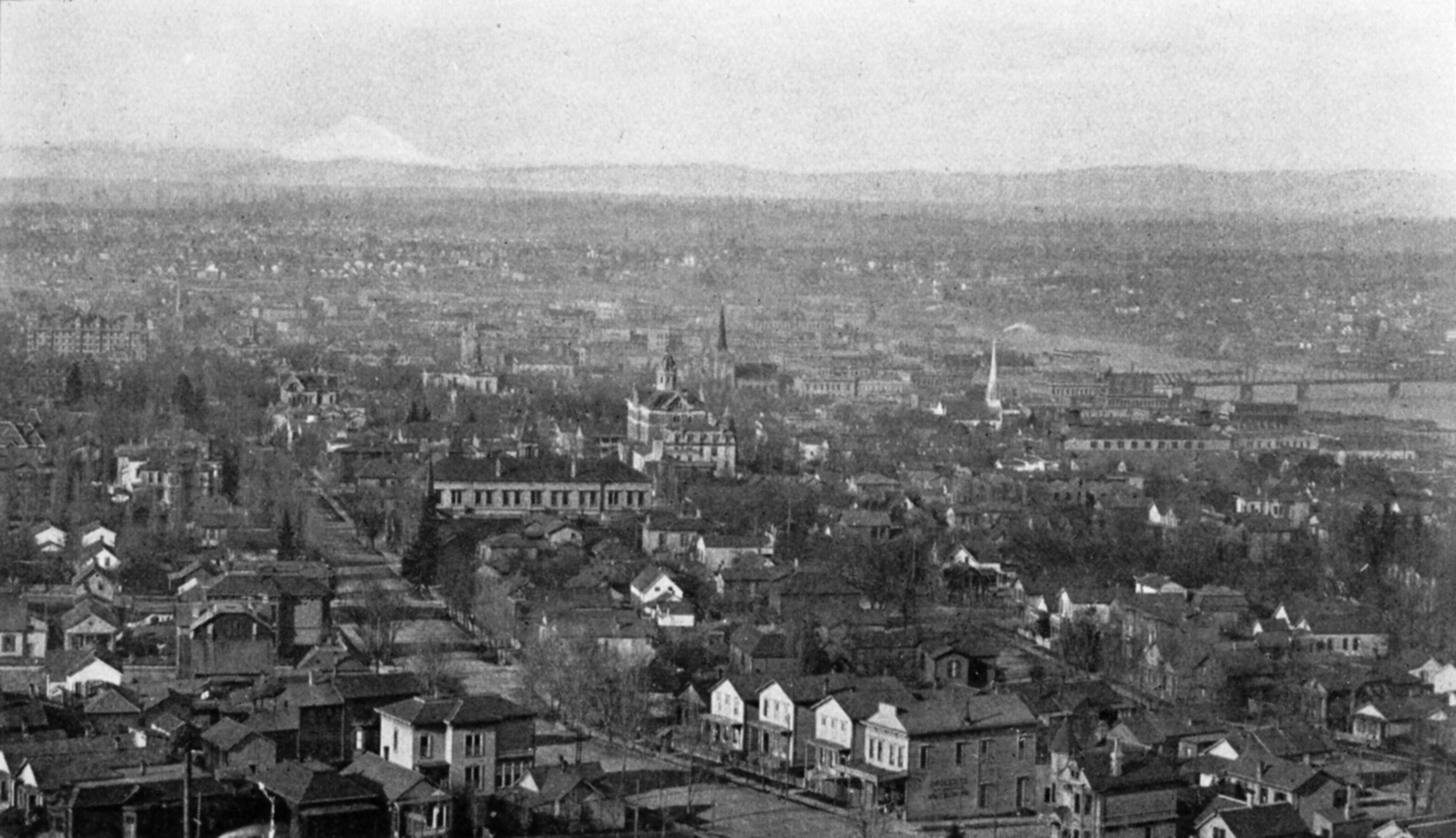
Portland as depicted in Frances Fuller Victor's Atlantis Arisen (1891).

A major fire swept through downtown in August 1873, destroying 20 blocks along the west side of the Willamette between Yamhill and Morrison. The fire caused $1.3 million in damage. In 1889, The Oregonian called Portland "the most filthy city in the Northern States", due to the unsanitary sewers and gutters. The West Shore reported "The new sidewalks put down this year are a disgrace to a Russian village."

The first Morrison Street Bridge opened in 1887 and was the first bridge across the Willamette River in Portland.

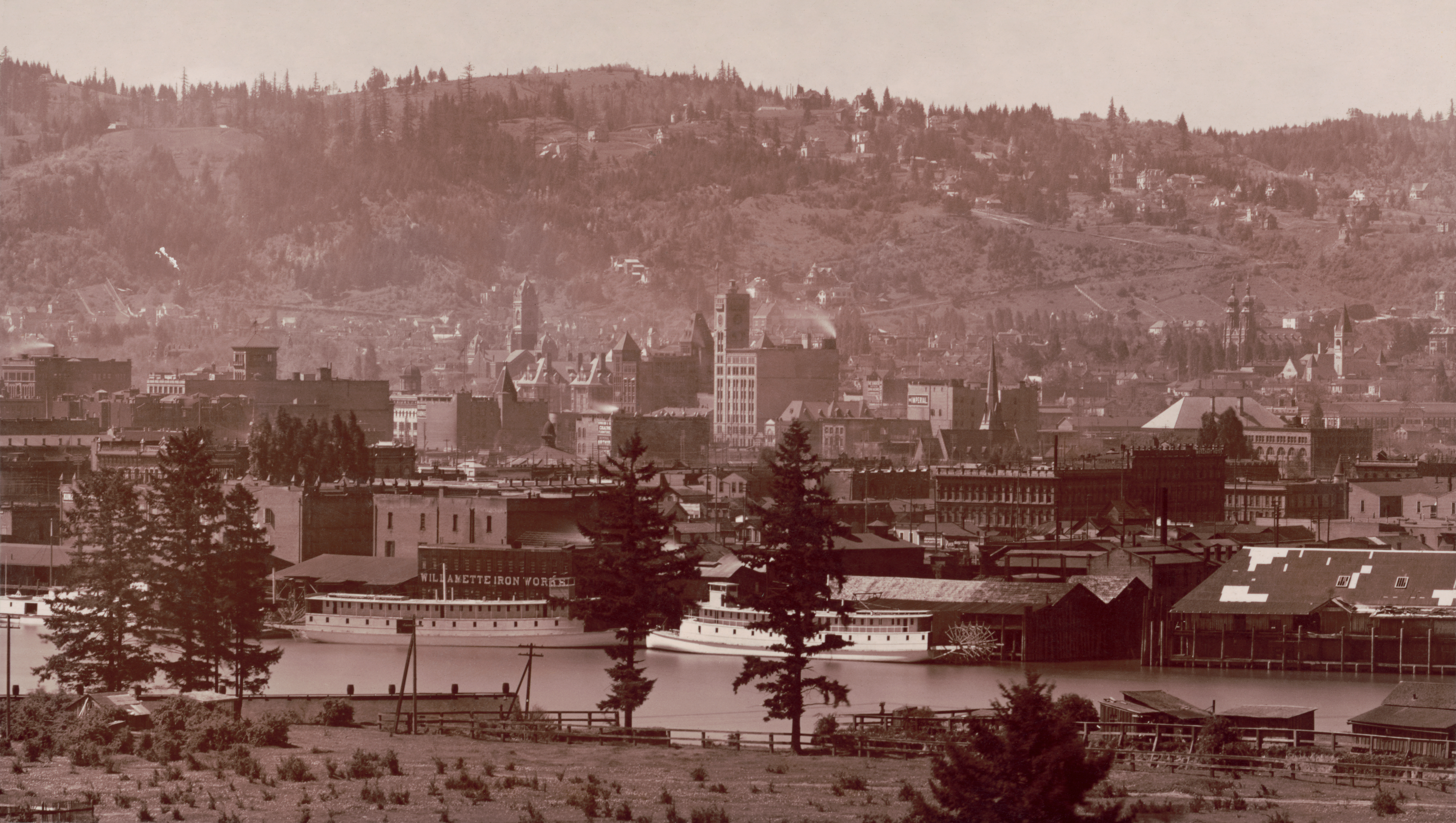
Portland's waterfront in 1898.

Portland was the major port in the Pacific Northwest for much of the 19th century, until the 1890s, when direct railroad access between the deepwater harbor in Seattle and points east, by way of Stampede Pass, was built. Goods could then be transported from the northwest coast to inland cities without the need to navigate the dangerous bar at the mouth of the Columbia River.

The city merged with Albina and East Portland in 1891. This made Portland the 41st largest city in the country, with approximately 70,000 residents. This merger was followed by the annexation of the neighboring city of Sellwood in 1893.

In 1894, the Columbia River saw one of its worst-ever floods, reaching a high-water mark of 33.5 feet in Portland.

== 20th century ==
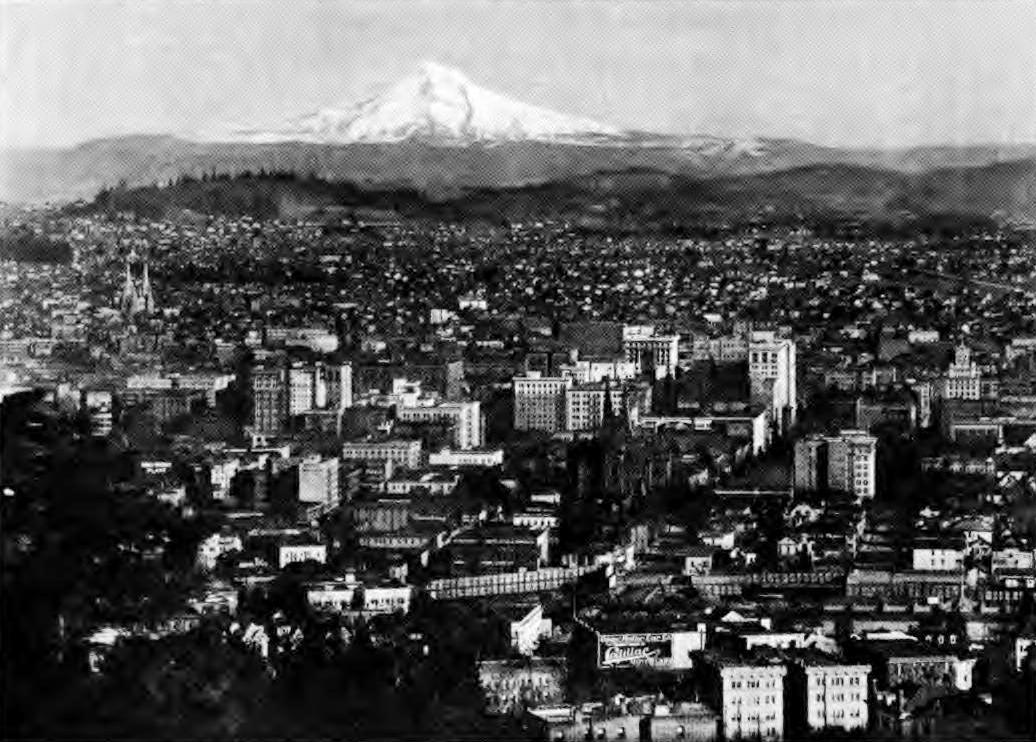
Portland and Mount Hood in 1910, looking east from the West Hills

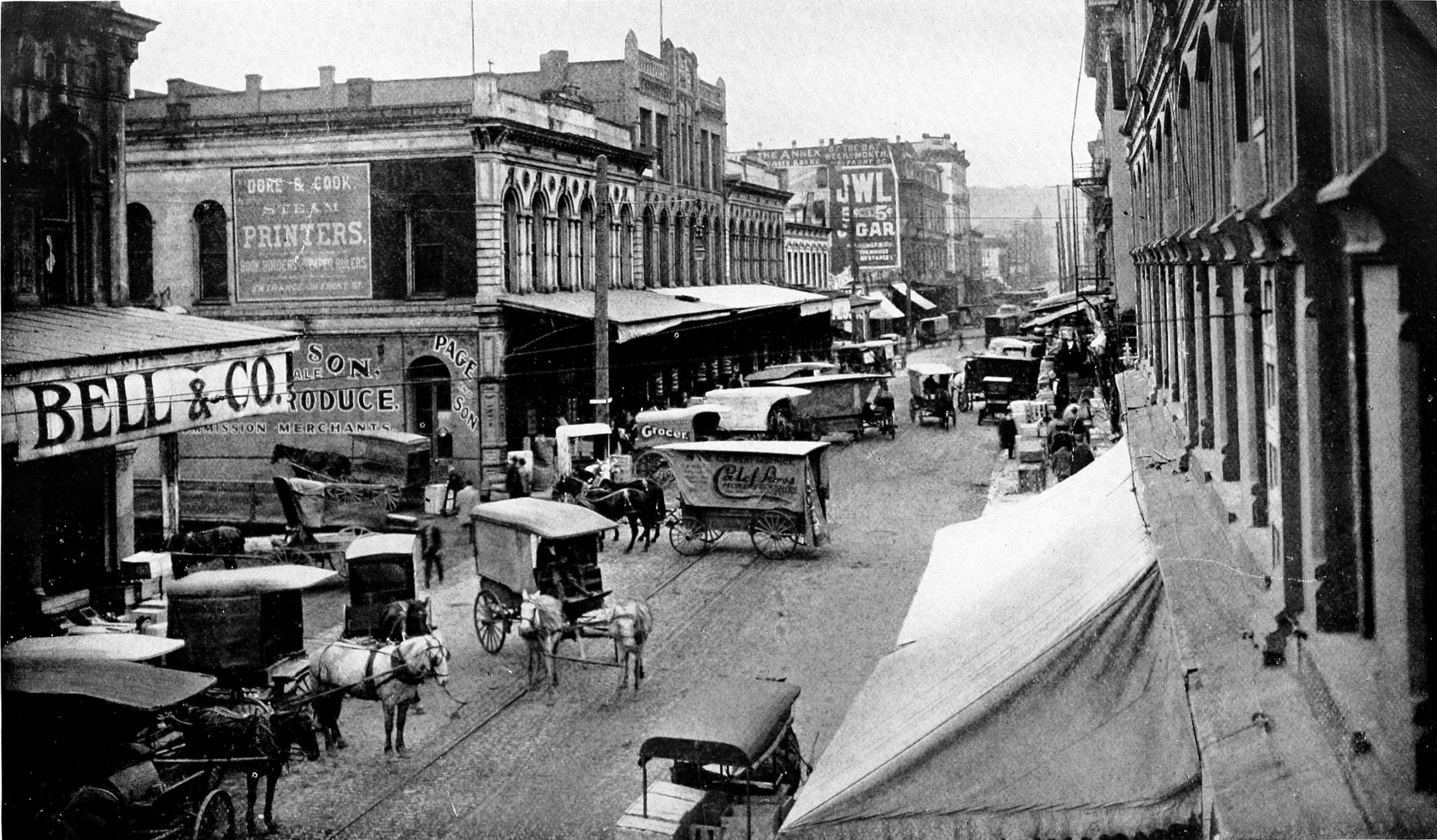
Front Street (now Naito Parkway) in 1910

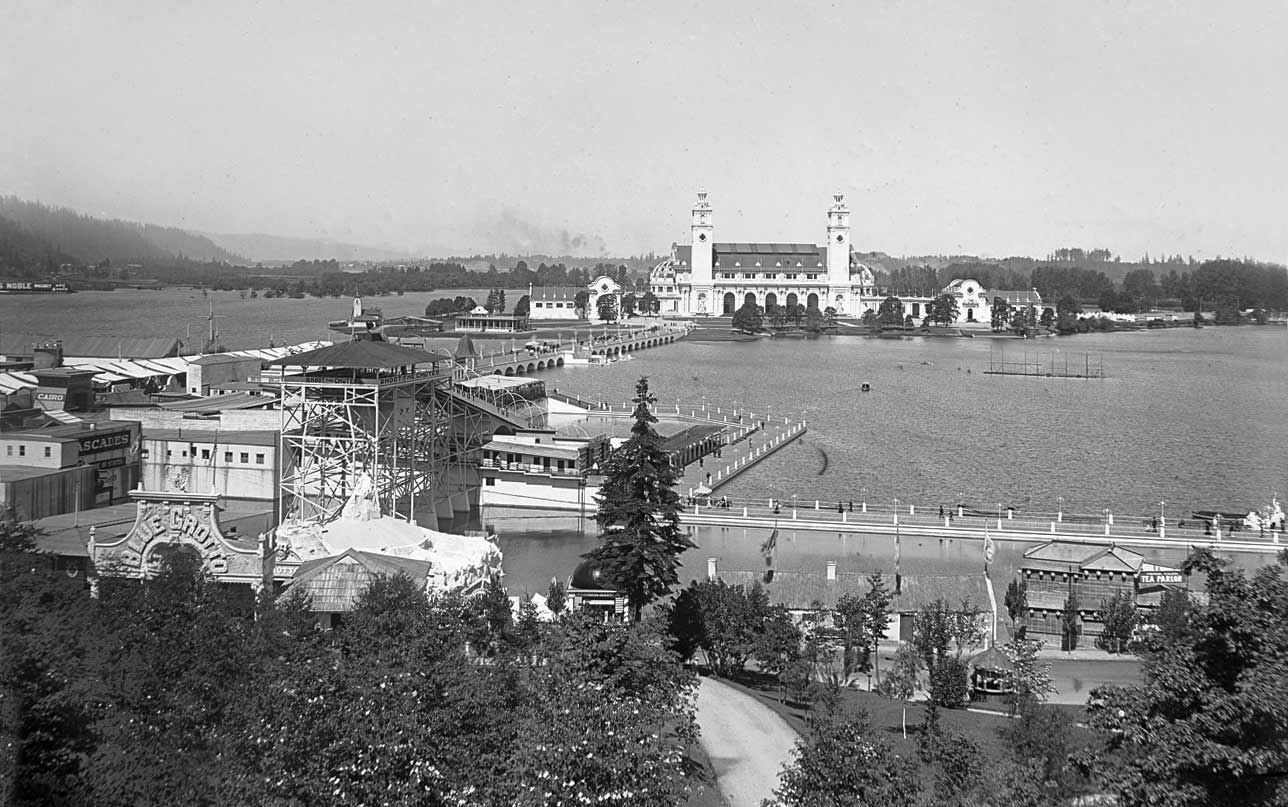
The Lewis and Clark Centennial Exposition, Portland's only world's fair

In 1905, Portland was the host city of the Lewis and Clark Centennial Exposition, a world's fair. This event increased recognition of the city, which contributed to a doubling of the population of Portland, from 90,426 in 1900 to 207,214 in 1910.

In 1911, the Willamette River flooded much of Downtown Portland, though not much damage is noted.

In 1912 the city's 52 distinctive bronze temperance fountains known locally as "Benson bubblers" were installed around the downtown area by logging magnate Simon Benson.

In 1915, the city merged with Linnton and St. Johns.

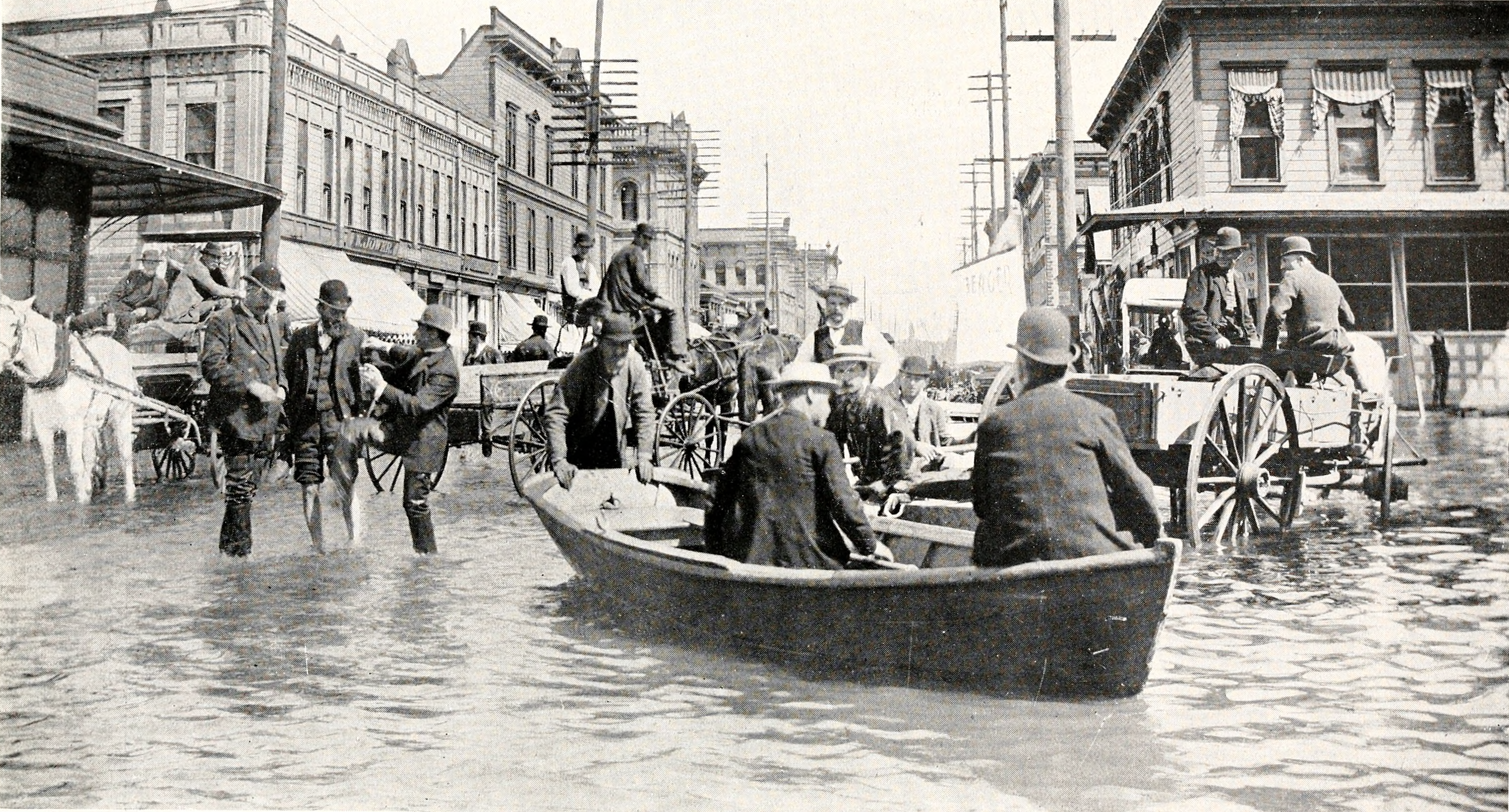
The 1911 flood

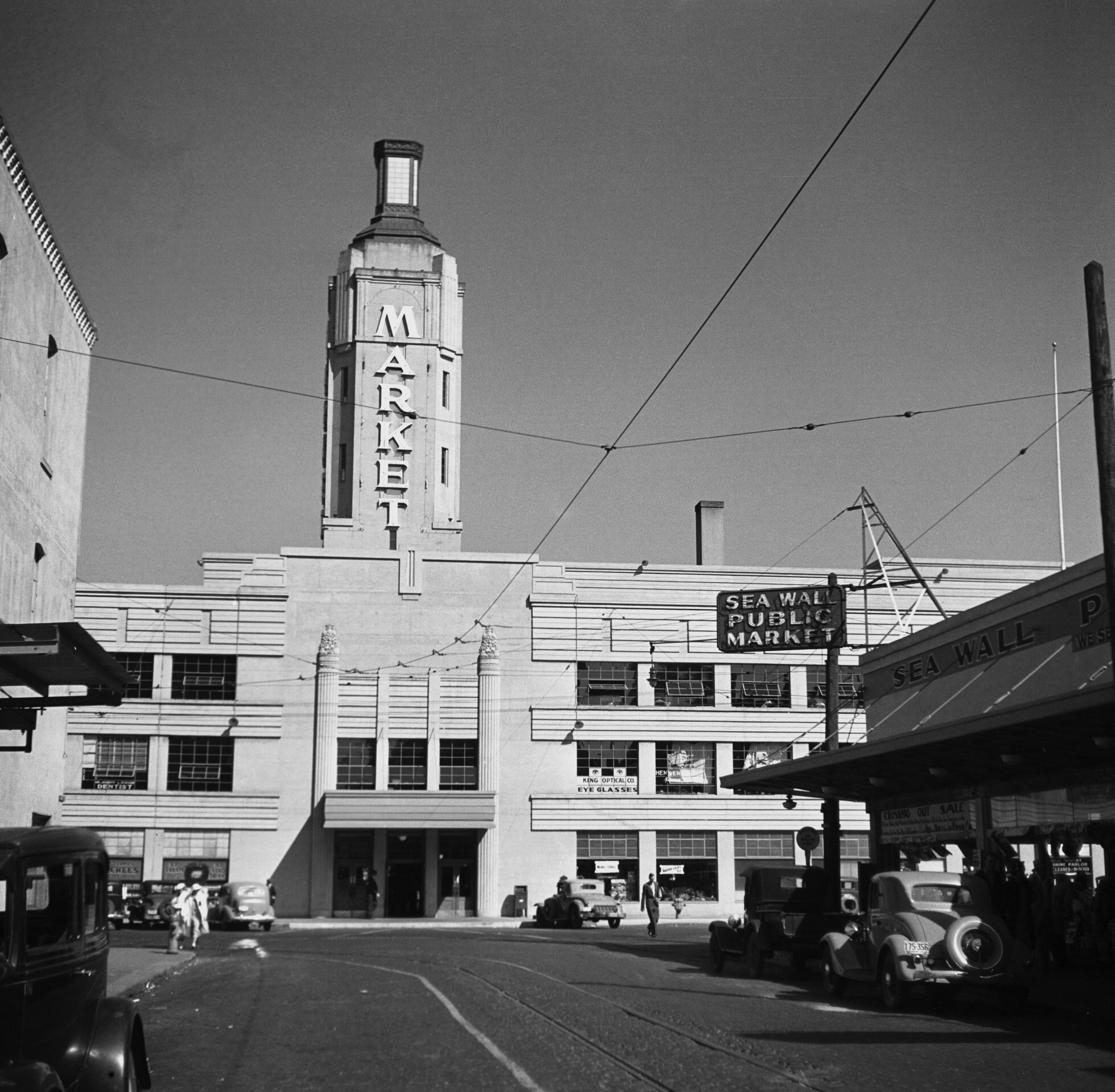
The Portland Public Market, in downtown, operated from 1933 to 1942. This view is looking east on Yamhill Street at Front St. (now Naito Parkway).

July 1913 saw a free speech fight when, during a strike by women workers at the Oregon Packing Company, Mayor Henry Albee declared street speaking illegal, with an exception made for religious speech. This declaration was intended to stop public speeches by the Industrial Workers of the World in support of the strikers.

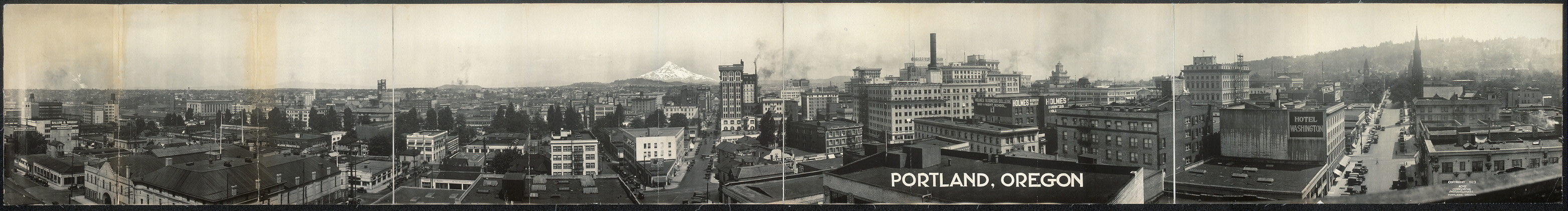
Panoramic view of Portland, 1923.

On June 9, 1934, approximately 1,400 members of the International Longshoremen's Association (ILA) participated in the West Coast waterfront strike, which shut down shipping in every port along the West Coast. The demands of the ILA were: recognition of the union; wage increases from 85 cents to $1.00 per hour straight time and from $1.25 to $1.50 per hour overtime; a six-hour workday and 30-hour work week; and a closed shop with the union in control of hiring. They were also frustrated that shipping subsidies from the government, in place since industry distress in the 1920s, were leading to larger profits for the shipping companies that weren't passed down to the workers. There were numerous incidents of violence between strikers and police, including strikers storming the Admiral Evans, which was being used as a hotel for strikebreakers; police shooting four strikers at Terminal 4 in St. Johns; and special police shooting at Senator Robert Wagner of New York as he inspected the site of the previous shooting. The longshoremen resumed work on July 31, 1934, after voting to arbitrate. The arbitration decision was handed down on October 12, 1934, awarding the strikers with recognition of the ILA; higher pay of 95 cents per hour straight time and $1.40 per hour overtime, retroactive to the return to work on July 31; six-hour workdays and 30-hour workweeks, and a union hiring hall managed jointly by the union and management – though the union selected the dispatcher – in every port along the entire West Coast.

=== World War II ===
In 1940, Portland was on the brink of an economic and population boom, fueled by over $2 billion spent by the U.S. Congress on expanding the Bonneville Power Administration, the need to produce materiel for Great Britain's increased preparations for war, as well as to meet the needs of the U.S. home front and the rapidly expanding American Navy.

The growth was led by Henry J. Kaiser, whose company had been the prime contractor in the construction of two Columbia River dams. In 1941, Kaiser Shipyards received federal contracts to build Liberty ships and aircraft carrier escorts; he chose Portland as one of the sites, and built two shipyards along the Willamette River, and a third in nearby Vancouver; the 150,000 workers he recruited to staff these shipyards play a major role in the growth of Portland, which added 160,000 residents during World War II. By war's end, Portland had a population of 359,000, and an additional 100,000 people lived and/or worked in nearby cities such as Vanport, Oregon City, and Troutdale.

The war jobs attracted large numbers of African-Americans into the small existing community—the numbers quadrupled. The newcomers became permanent residents, building up black political influence, strengthening civil rights organizations such as the NAACP calling for antidiscrimination legislation. On the negative side, racial tensions increased, both black and white residential areas deteriorated from overcrowding, and inside the black community there were angry words between "old settlers" and recent arrivals vying for leadership in the black communities.

In 1942, Japanese Americans, who primarily resided in Japantown, were moved to the Portland Assembly Center, a temporary internment center on the site of the Portland Expo Center. These individuals were eventually transported to internment camps. The majority of people complied with internment. Japantown became Old Town and its Japanese population never returned to meaningful numbers.

=== Postwar ===
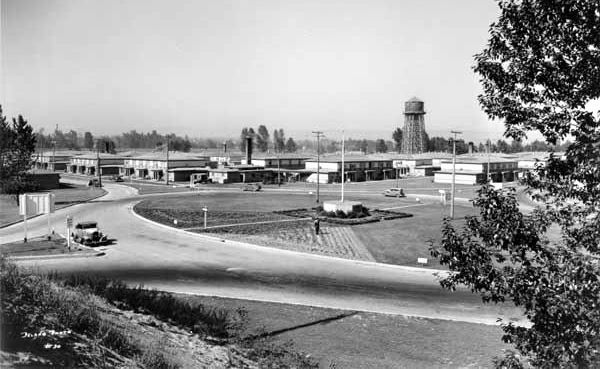
Vanport in 1943, just after being built

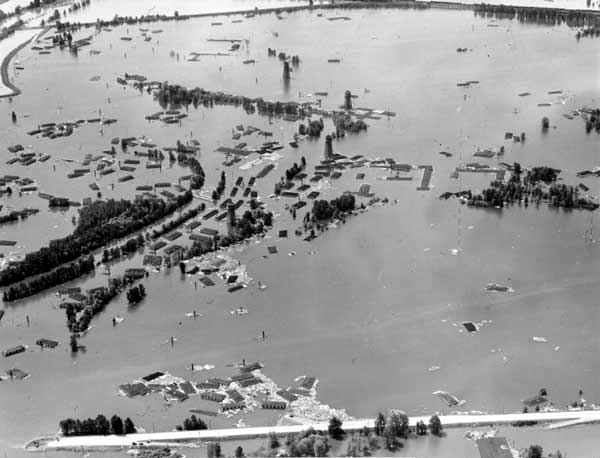
The aftermath of the Vanport Flood of 1948

As part of the 1948 Columbia River floods, Vanport, a small wartime public housing community, primarily inhabited by employees of Kaiser Shipyards, was flooded and completely destroyed. The community was not rebuilt. Despite being short-lived, Vanport's legacy is still seen today. Having a 40% Black population, Vanport led to the integration of Black people by Portland and the rest of Oregon. The Vanport Extension Center, a small college built to help veterans of World War II, moved to Downtown and became what is now Portland State University.

The 1940s and 1950s also saw an extensive network of organized crime, largely dominated by Jim Elkins. The McClellan Commission determined in the late 1950s that Portland not only had a local crime problem but also a situation that had serious national ramifications. In 1956 The Oregonian reporters determined that corrupt Teamsters officials were plotting to take over the city's vice rackets.

=== Interstate projects ===
As early as 1943, highway planner Robert Moses was commissioned by the city to create a system of improvements for after the World War II. a downtown loop consisting of what is now I-405 and an eastside freeway (now I-5) were part of this plan. After debating the downtown route, both freeways were built and completed in 1966 (I-5) and 1969 (I-405), and included the construction of the Fremont Bridge and Marquam Bridge. The eastside freeway was so hated that in a formal complaint, the Portland Arts Commission described it as "so gross, so lacking in grace, so utterly inconsistent with any concept of aesthetics".

The construction of I-405 displaced approximately 1,100 households and caused the demolition of hundreds of buildings. An expansion project of I-405, set to be called I-505, was cancelled in 1978 due to extensive public outcry.

In 1950, Harbor Drive, part of Oregon Route 99W, was reconstructed into a controlled-access freeway. It was signed as I-5 for a short time until the completion of the Marquam Bridge in 1966. In 1974, after months of protests which included blocking the highway, and with support from Governor Tom McCall, the highway, as well as buildings between the highway and Front Avenue, were demolished. The highway and most of the former buildings' sites were turned into Tom McCall Waterfront Park, and Front Avenue was widened to become a boulevard. In 1996, Front Avenue was renamed Naito Parkway after businessman and civic leader Bill Naito.

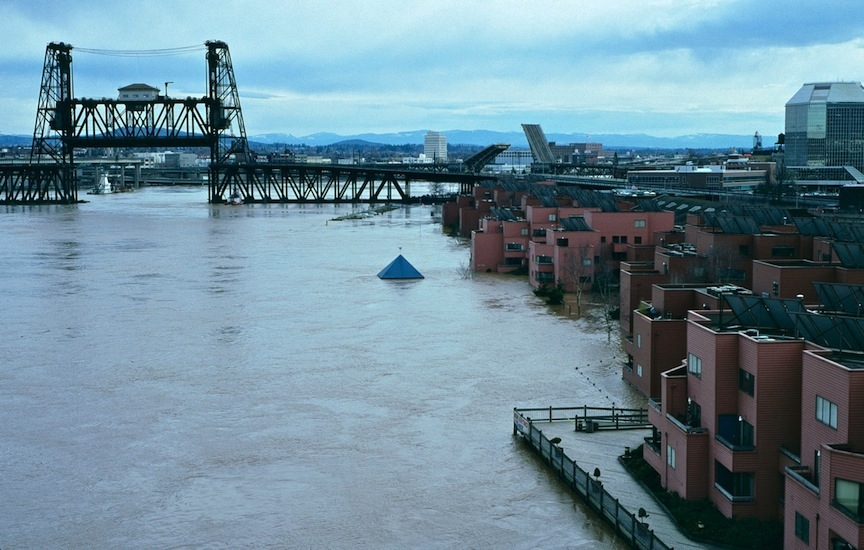

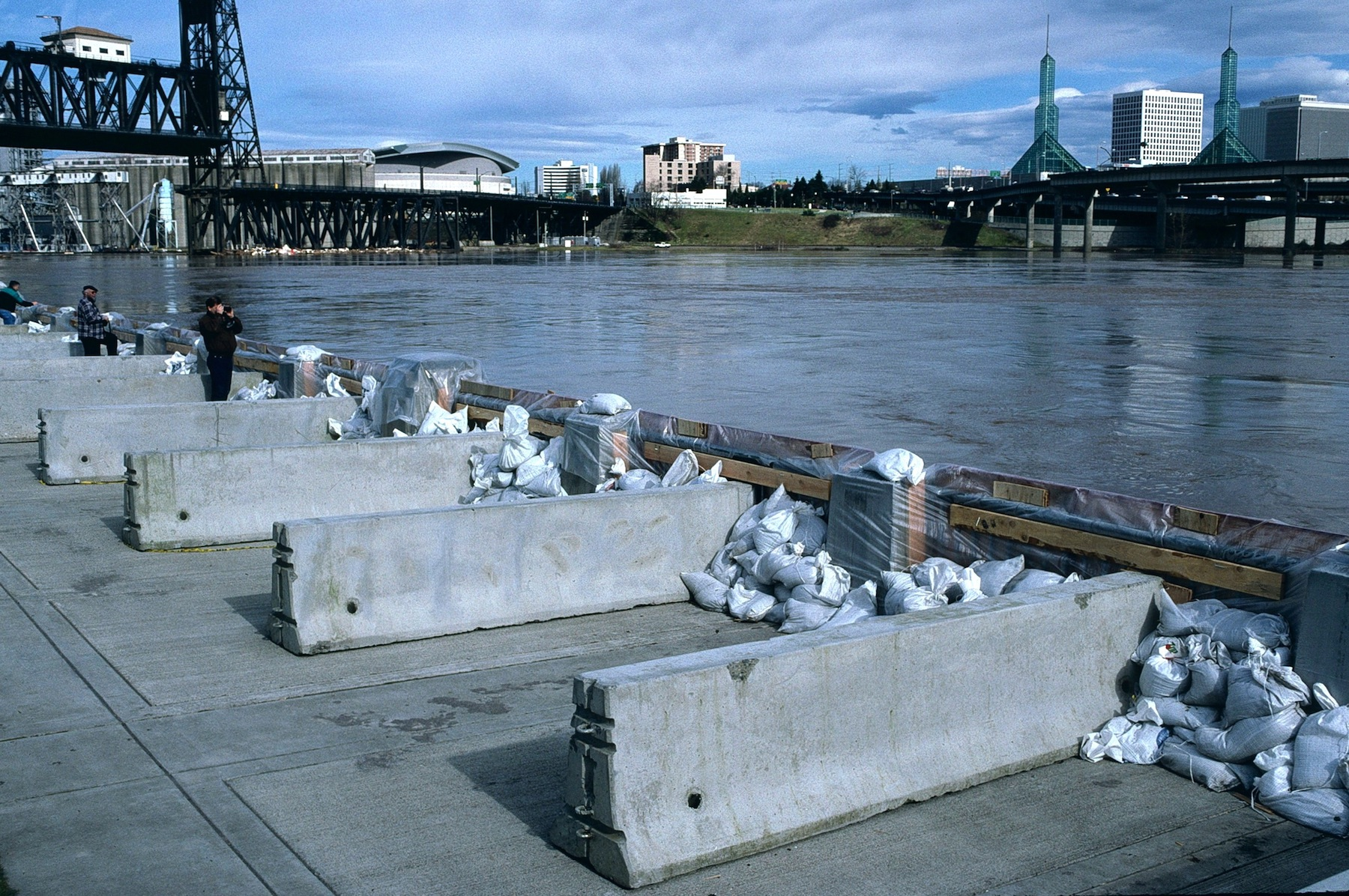
Downtown Portland during the 1996 flood

=== Late 20th century ===
Public transportation in Portland transitioned from private to public ownership in 1969–70, as the private companies found it increasingly difficult to make a profit and were on the verge of bankruptcy. A new regional government agency, the Tri-County Metropolitan Transportation District (Tri-Met), replaced Rose City Transit in 1969 and the "Blue Bus" lines—connecting Portland with its suburbs—in 1970.

In early 1996, the Portland area saw a major flood. The Willamette River crested at 28.6 feet (8.7 m), some 10.6 feet (3.2 m) above flood stage, and came within inches of flowing over the seawall. The Oregon National Guard and civilian volunteers participated in a massive sand-bagging effort which was maintained until the floodwaters retreated. Five rivers in Oregon crested at all-time highs.

== 21st century ==
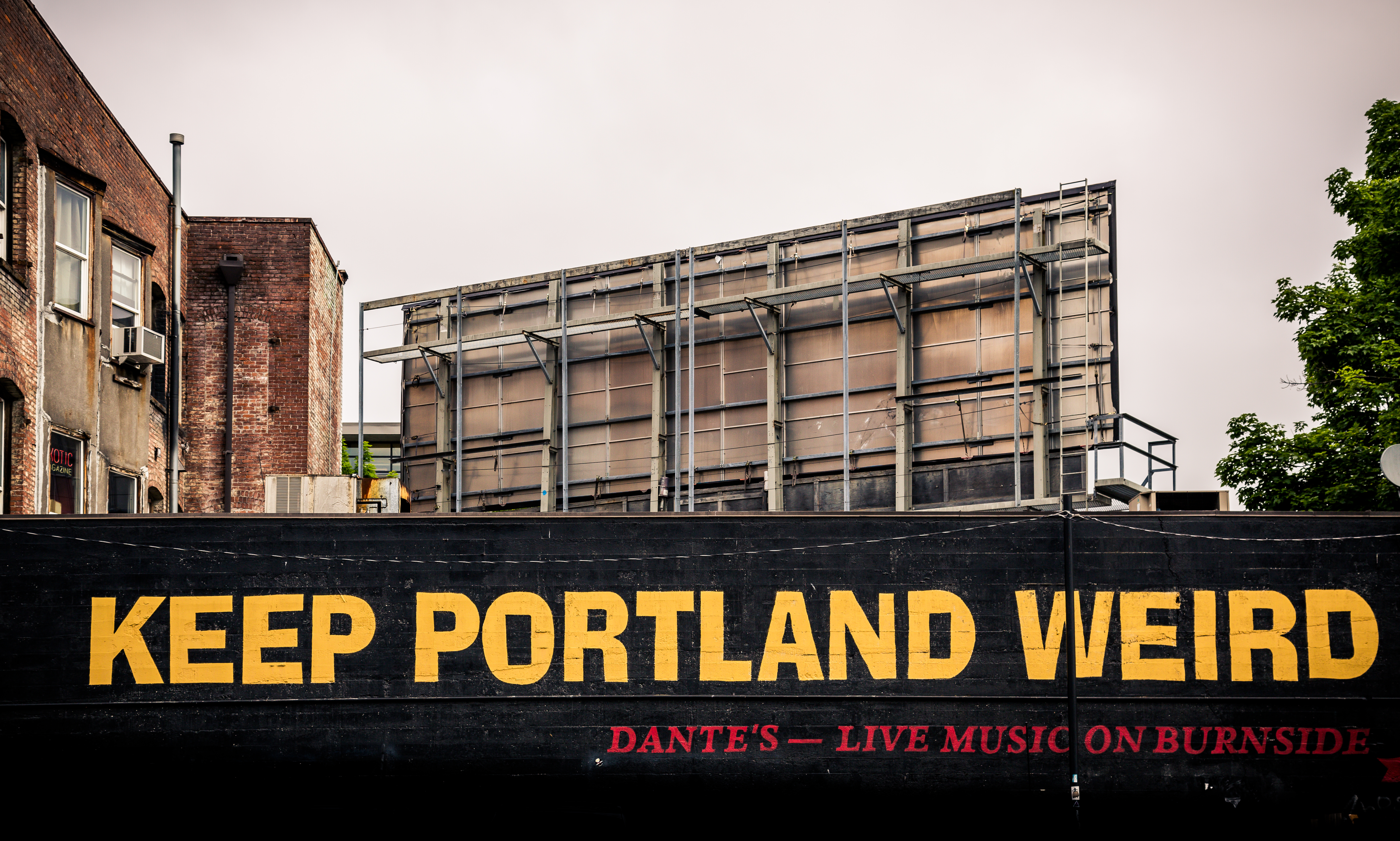
The Keep Portland Weird mural in Old Town Chinatown

Portland experienced a significant growth of over 90,000 people between the years 2000 and 2014. Between 2001 and 2012, Portland's gross domestic product per person grew by fifty percent, more than any other city in the country. and it was second in the country for attracting and retaining the highest number of college-educated people in the United States.

Portland became known throughout the early 2000s for its unique culture and attractiveness to young people. "Keep Portland Weird" became an unofficial slogan and is popularized by a large mural in Old Town Chinatown and the bumper stickers replicating the mural. Portland has embraced this "weirdness" by hosting many odd events including the World Naked Bike Ride and the Portland Urban Idiotarod, a shopping cart race where participants wear absurd costumes and often doubles as a bar crawl. Portland is also home to various strange establishments including the 24 Hour Church of Elvis, the TARDIS Room, and the Peculiarium.

In the early 2000s, Portland became home to various street performers. Many of these performers embrace Portland's "weirdness" including the Unipiper, a unicycling bagpiper who wears a Darth Vader mask, and Working Kirk Reeves, a trumpet player and juggler known for his crisp white suit and Mickey Mouse hat.

In 2003, Portland's longtime nickname "The City of Roses" (or "Rose City") was made official by the City Council.

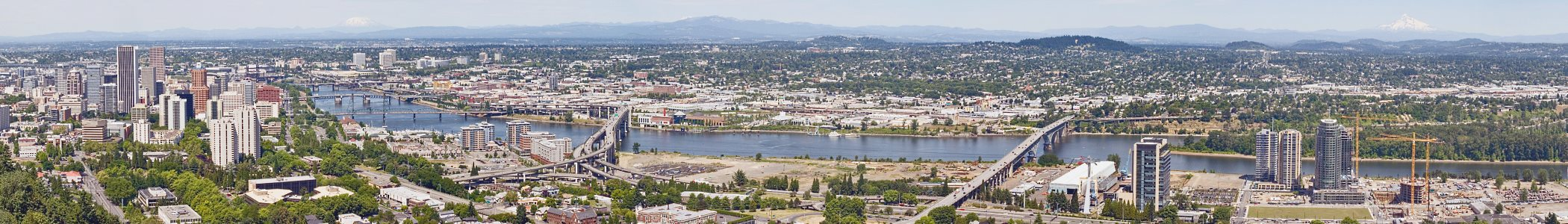
Panoramic view of Portland, 2007. Downtown located at far left.

=== Civil unrest ===
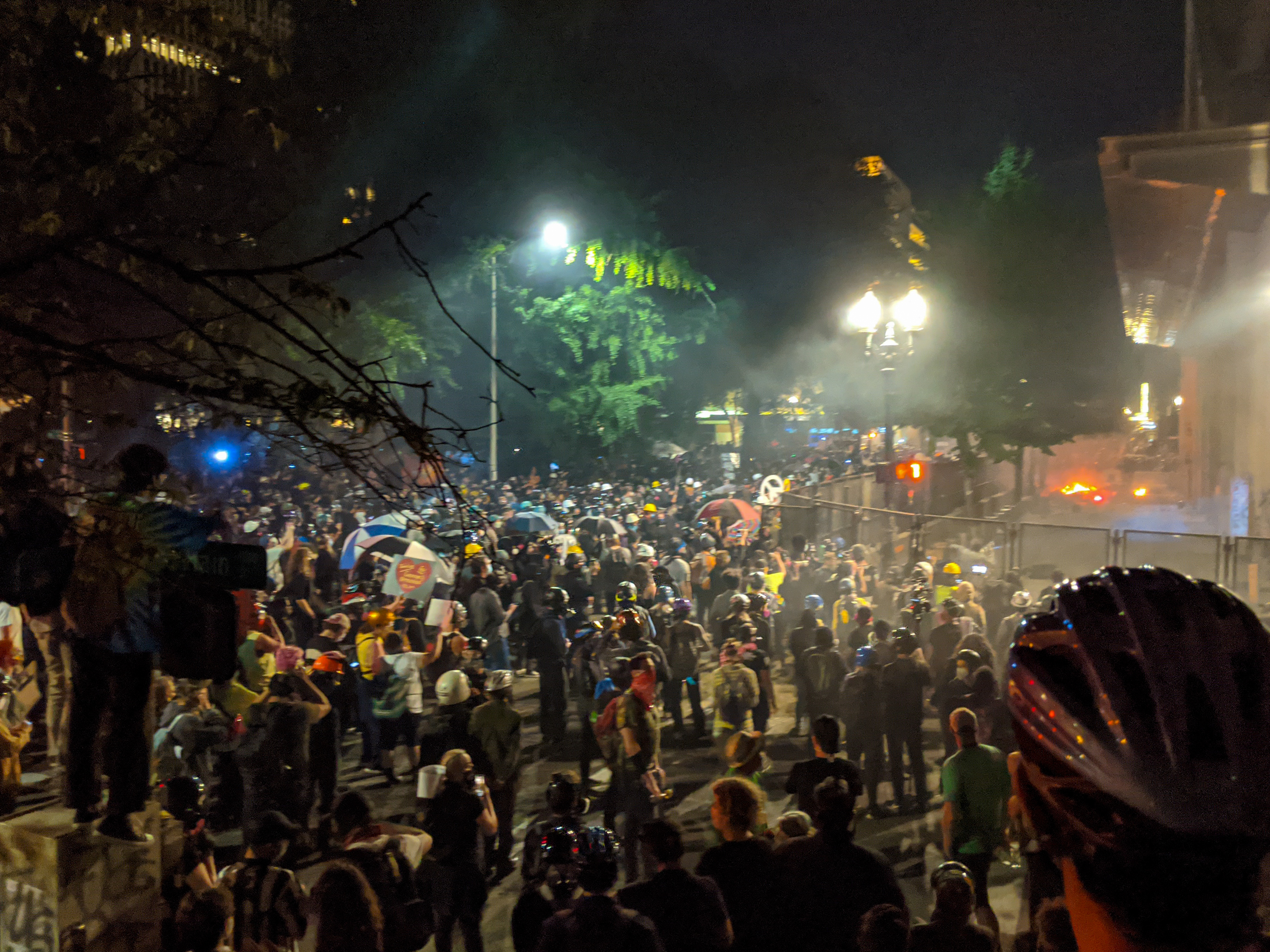
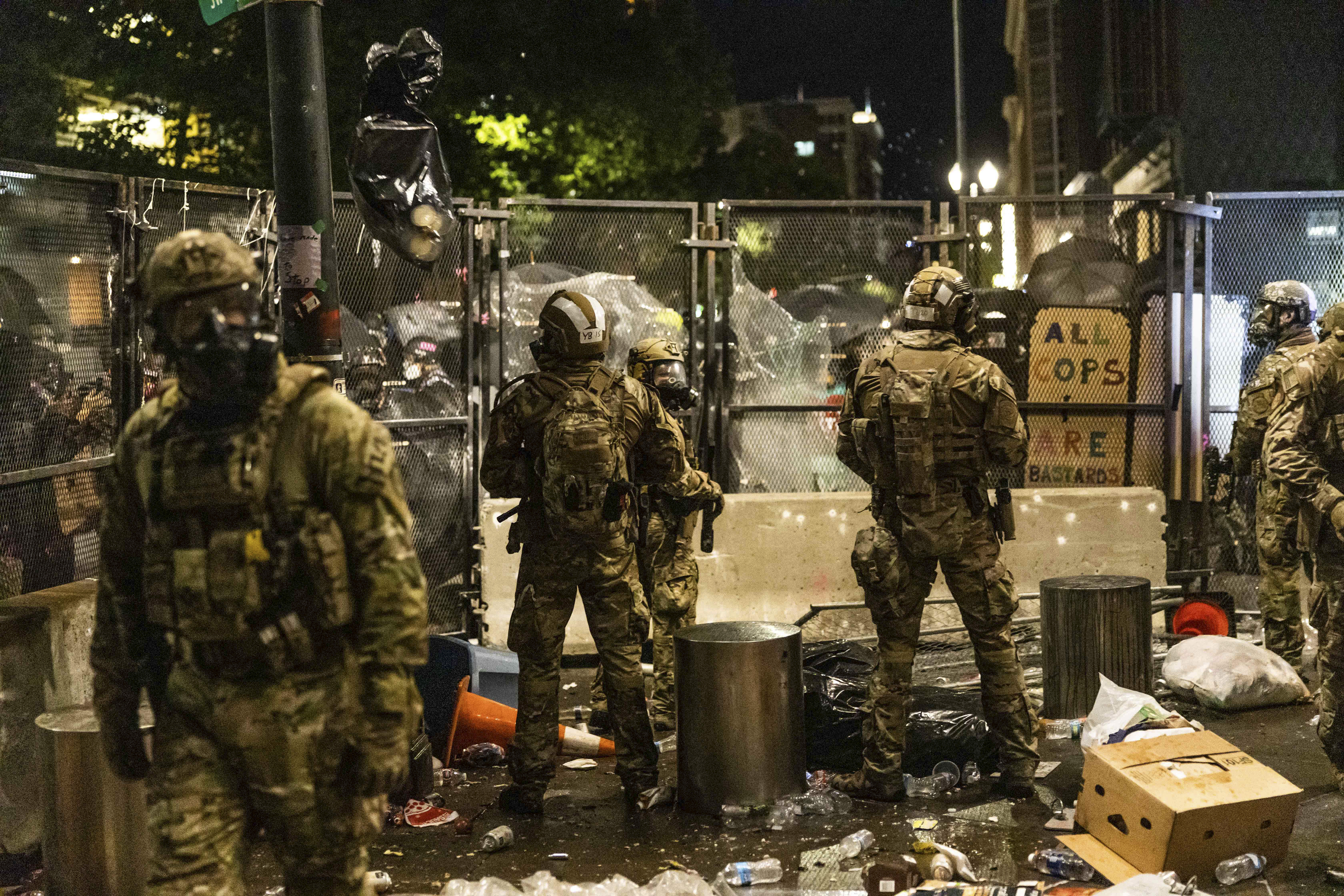
Scenes from the various demonstrations against racial injustice from 2020-2021

In the wake of the murder of George Floyd in May 2020, continuing through spring 2021, Portland saw daily protests against Floyd's murder, police violence and racial injustice. Many of these protests turned violent and led to looting, vandalism, and assault. In one case, a protestor was killed by an opposing one. Millions of dollars were lost by local businesses from theft and vandalism.

President Donald Trump deployed multiple groups of federal officers to assist locally based Federal Protective Service officers in guarding federal property as the Mark O. Hatfield United States Courthouse and the Edith Green – Wendell Wyatt Federal Building were primary targets of the vandalism and rioting. Temporary fences and boards are up around the two federal buildings and the Multnomah County Justice Center as of February 2024.

On July 22, Mayor Ted Wheeler attended one of the protests and was tear-gassed by federal officers.

These riots also led to the vandalism and removal of many of Portland's statues. Of the six statues removed, only one (Thompson Elk Fountain) was initially planned to be replaced. In 2024, the city announced plans to put back the statues of George Washington, Abraham Lincoln, Theodore Roosevelt. The statue of Harvey W. Scott and The Promised Land (which depicts Oregon pioneers), will be sold or donated. Additionally, a statue of York, a slave on the Lewis and Clark Expedition, will be commissioned.

=== New government ===
In the November 2022 election, Portland residents voted to change the city's form of government. Portland at the time was the only major city in the country to operate under a city commission form of government. This included a five-member board, including the mayor, who each ran various bureaus of the city. Under the new form of government, the mayor is no longer a part of the city council and the city council has twelve districted seats with three council members each representing one of four districts. Additionally, elections use a single transferable vote system as opposed to a first-past-the-post system. The first election for this new form of government was in 2024.

== Cultural history ==
While visual arts had always been important in the Pacific Northwest, the mid-1990s saw a dramatic rise in the number of artists, independent galleries, site-specific shows and public discourse about the arts. Several arts publications were founded. The Portland millennial art renaissance has been described, written about and commented on in publications such as ARTnews, Art Papers, Art in America, Modern Painters and Artforum and discussed on CNN. The Wall Street Journal's Peter Plagens noted the vibrancy of Portland's alternative art spaces.

== See also ==
- James B. Stephens
- James C. Hawthorne
- A Day Called 'X'
- Columbus Day Storm of 1962
- Mount Hood Freeway
- Mayors of Portland
- Timeline of Portland, Oregon
- History of Chinese Americans in Portland, Oregon
- African Americans in Oregon
- Protests in Portland, Oregon
- COVID-19 pandemic in Portland, Oregon
