= Oregon Lyceum =

The Oregon Lyceum or Pioneer Lyceum and Literary Club was founded in Oregon City, Oregon Country around 1840. The forum was a prominent fixture for the leading pioneer settlers during its brief existence. It would begin publishing the first American newspaper west of the Rocky Mountains in 1846 and had several names during its existence.

== Founding ==
One source lists the founding of the institution as 1844, but this is unlikely as there are many references to debates regarding forming a government in 1842. The forum was likely started at that time with the goal of producing a newspaper in the region. That paper, the Oregon Spectator, began publishing in 1846.

The Lyceum's first meeting was held at the home of Sidney Moss who had purchased his land in Oregon City from Dr. John McLoughlin of the Hudson's Bay Company (HBC). Frederick Prigg was another member of the Lyceum that assisted in building the organization. So was Portland co-founder Francis Pettygrove.

In addition to debates on government and the creation of a press, the group discussed literary items, scientific pursuits, and other local issues. Literary works of the group were published in the Spectator. The group was also known as The Willamette Falls Debating Society or The Falls Association.

Other notable members during its existence include: Henry A. G. Lee, William H. Gray, Lansford W. Hastings, Elisha Applegate, Jesse Applegate, Asa Lovejoy, Sidney W. Moss, Robert Newell, James W. Nesmith, William C. Dement, Medorem Crawford, Hiram Straight, William Cushing, Philip Foster, Theophilus Magruder, Daniel Waldo, Peter G. Stewart, Isaac W. Smith, Joseph Watt, Frank Ermatinger, Albert E. Wilson, Jacob Hoover, John Minto, Barton Lee, and John P. Brooks.

== Government debate ==
Beginning in the fall and winter of 1840-1841 the members of the Lyceum debated the future of the region. At the time neither the United States nor Great Britain could claim the Oregon Country under the terms of the Treaty of 1818 signed at the conclusion of the War of 1812. During these debates in Oregon City the European settlers argued about whether an independent country should be formed, or if a provisional government should be formed.

Those lyceum members advocating an independent country were mainly British, including Dr. McLoughlin and his HBC employees. Although many former fur trappers (predominantly French-Canadian Roman Catholics) and the region's Jesuit missionaries sided with McLoughlin on this issue. Both groups viewed the formation of an independent country as preventing the territory from eventually becoming a part of the United States. McLoughlin's attorney L. W. Hastings, introduced a resolution on his behalf to the Lyceum as follows:

Resolved, That it is expedient for the settlers of the coast to organize an independent government.

The resolution was adopted but at that same meeting George Abernethy of the Methodist Mission introduced a competing issue following the vote to be discussed the next week. This new resolution was in essence in favor of waiting for the United States to annex the territory instead:

Resolved, That if the United States extends its jurisdiction over this country during the next four years it will not be expedient to form an independent government.

After debate of the issues, (which by now, according to later observers, included the option of no provisional government if an independent nation was not formed) the resolution in favor of a four-year delay passed and ultimately the side favoring America prevailed.

== Later years ==
It is not known when the Oregon Lyceum disbanded, but the Lyceum movement in the United States died out around the turn of the Twentieth Century.
