= Prigg =

Prigg is a surname. Notable people with this surname include:

- Frederick Prigg (1812–1849), English-American physician
- Wally Prigg (1908–1980), Australian rugby league footballer

== See also ==
- Prigg v. Pennsylvania, 1842 United States Supreme Court case
- Prig, an insult
