= William Overton (Portland founder) =

American pioneer of Oregon

- Born: Tennessee, U.S.
- Died: 1840s
- Occupation: Pioneer

William Overton was a pioneer of the Oregon Country in the Pacific Northwest region of North America. In the mid-1840s he purchased the land claim, along with Asa Lovejoy, for the site which would become Portland, Oregon. Overton sold his share shortly thereafter to Francis Pettygrove.

== Background ==
According to historian Harvey W. Scott, who published a comprehensive history of Portland in 1890, little was known about Overton. It was generally agreed that he originated from Tennessee and settled in Oregon City, possibly arriving with Joseph Gale by way of California, though he spent his first months in Oregon, from November 1, 1841 to the early part of 1842, working at the Methodist mission at The Dalles.

Overton was described by James W. Nesmith as a "desperate, rollicking fellow." He and Lovejoy visited a site along the Willamette River between present-day Jefferson and Washington streets while traveling from Fort Vancouver to Oregon City by canoe in 1843 or 1844. The site had been previously cleared of trees, perhaps by natives, and had become a popular stopping point for those traveling the Willamette. It was generally agreed that a large city would be established somewhere in the vicinity of the confluence of the Willamette and Columbia rivers. Overton wanted to make a claim on the land, but prevailed upon Lovejoy to record the claim of 640 acres (260 ha), and the two men set about clearing more trees and building habitable dwellings. Overton's cabin was open in the front—effectively a shed. The original Portland plat was 16 blocks, laid out in 1845.

== Disappearance and aftermath ==
Overton "drove staves and shingles" on the site, and sold them at Oregon City. He offered to sell his share to Jimmie Stephens, a cooper, for 300 barrels, but Stephens declined. Lovejoy and Pettygrove were considering platting a city on the site. Overton sold his share of the land claim to Pettygrove for $50, though he had to pay Lovejoy $60 for improvements the two made on Overton's land. He then departed for Texas, upon hearing that his mother was ill and living there, and was never heard from again. It was rumored that he was hanged in Texas, although records indicate he may have ended up in Hawaii.

Overton Street in Northwest Portland is named after him.

== See also ==
- History of Portland, Oregon
- List of people who disappeared
