= Frederick Prigg =

American physician and pharmacist

4^{th} Secretary for the Provisional Government of Oregon
- In office June 26, 1846 – September 16, 1848
- Preceded by: John E. Long
- Succeeded by: Samuel M. Holderness
- Constituency: Oregon Country

Personal details
- Born: 1812 Bury St. Edmunds, Suffolk, England
- Died: October 1849 (age 37) Oregon City, Oregon Territory, United States
- Profession: Doctor and pharmacist

Frederick Prigg (1812–1849) was an American medical doctor and pharmacist. He served as Secretary for the Provisional Government of Oregon, a position that eventually became the Oregon Secretary of State, which is now the second-highest office in the state. He opened the first commercial drugstore in the Oregon County and served as a district judge in Clackamas County during Oregon's pre-territorial period.

== Early life ==
Prigg was born in Bury St. Edmunds, Suffolk, England, in 1812. He was born into an affluent English family and was well educated. His education included sufficient medical training to qualify him as a doctor and pharmacist.

As a young man, Prigg made at least one trip to North America, serving as a medical assistant for a group of emigrants from Suffolk and Norfolk heading for Canada. After delivering the immigrants to Quebec, he returned to England in 1836. By 1837, he was working in a drugstore in his home county of Suffolk. Sometime during that year, he was stricken with yellow fever. He later wrote to friends telling them he was recovering. After his illness, Prigg lost touch with his friends in the Suffolk area. By 1839, his friends were concerned enough that they advertised in a local newspaper seeking information about his whereabouts and health.

Prigg immigrated to United States in 1843. In January of that year he arrived alone in New Orleans, Louisiana, on the steamship New York. The ship's passenger list records him as a merchant.

== Oregon City ==
After arriving in the United States, Prigg immediately headed west, traveling across the Great Plains along the Oregon Trail in a covered wagon. He arrived in the Oregon Country in late 1843. He settled in Oregon City. Prigg had brought a supply of medicines and chemicals with him which he used to open a drugstore in the city. While Doctor John McLoughlin, head of the Hudson's Bay Company in the Oregon Country, and Methodist missionary Jason Lee both kept stocks of medical supplies prior to his arrival, Prigg's drugstore was the first commercial pharmacy in the Oregon Country. He dispensed drugs such as laudanum, quinine, and various laxatives for treatment of malaria, fever, wounds, and general ailments. His store also stocked household goods, clothes, fabrics, and imported pocket watches. Prigg advertised his business in the Oregon Spectator newspaper. His advertisements said he had a stock of drugs and chemicals along with expensive fabrics, nice clothes, and English watches for sale.

Prigg was also active in civic affairs. He helped found and promote the Pioneer Lyceum and Literary Club. Established in 1844 before the Oregon Country had any newspapers, the Lyceum was a community library and popular forum for discussing timely political topics and Oregon governance issues. Prigg also belonged to an informal social club that included James Nesmith, Jesse Applegate, and Samuel M. Holderness. Prigg briefly served as editor of the Oregon Spectator in 1846, the year it was founded as the only newspaper in the Oregon Country. He was a founding member of Oregon's first medical society and served as secretary for the society's first meeting in 1848.

== Government affairs ==
During the fourth pre-provisional legislative meeting in June and July 1845, Prigg served as the session's revising clerk. In August of that year, Prigg served as engrossing clerk during a special session of the legislature. In October 1845, Prigg was appointed one of three Clackamas County district judges along with Francis Pettygrove and Peter G. Stewart. Court sessions were sometimes held at Prigg's home in Oregon City. In addition, Prigg briefly served as Clackamas County probate judge in early 1846. During that same period, Prigg served as city recorder for Oregon City. In that position, he solicited proposals to remove stumps from city property.

On June 21, 1846, the secretary of Oregon's provision government, Doctor John E. Long, drowned while trying to ford a river near Oregon City. On June 26, 1846, Governor George Abernethy appointed Prigg to the vacant secretary position; the legislature formally elected him in December. Prigg served in that position until he resigned on September 16, 1848. Prigg's secretary post eventually became the Oregon Secretary of State position, the second-highest office in the state.

== Death ==
Prigg was recognized as a man of good education and ability, but intemperate in his personal habits. While alcohol was illegal in Oregon at that time, Prigg was known to be a drinker. He often drank a local moonshine called "Blue Ruin". In October 1849, Prigg drowned in the Willamette River after falling from the rocky bluff above the river near Oregon City. Some people suspected that his death was the result of intoxication. He was 37 years old. There is no evidence that his body was ever recovered from the river, so Prigg's final resting place is unknown.

Both Prigg and his immediate predecessor in the provisional government secretary position, John E. Long, were doctors who drowned in a river near Oregon City; their deaths were just three years apart.
