= Francis Ermatinger House =

- U.S. National Register of Historic Places
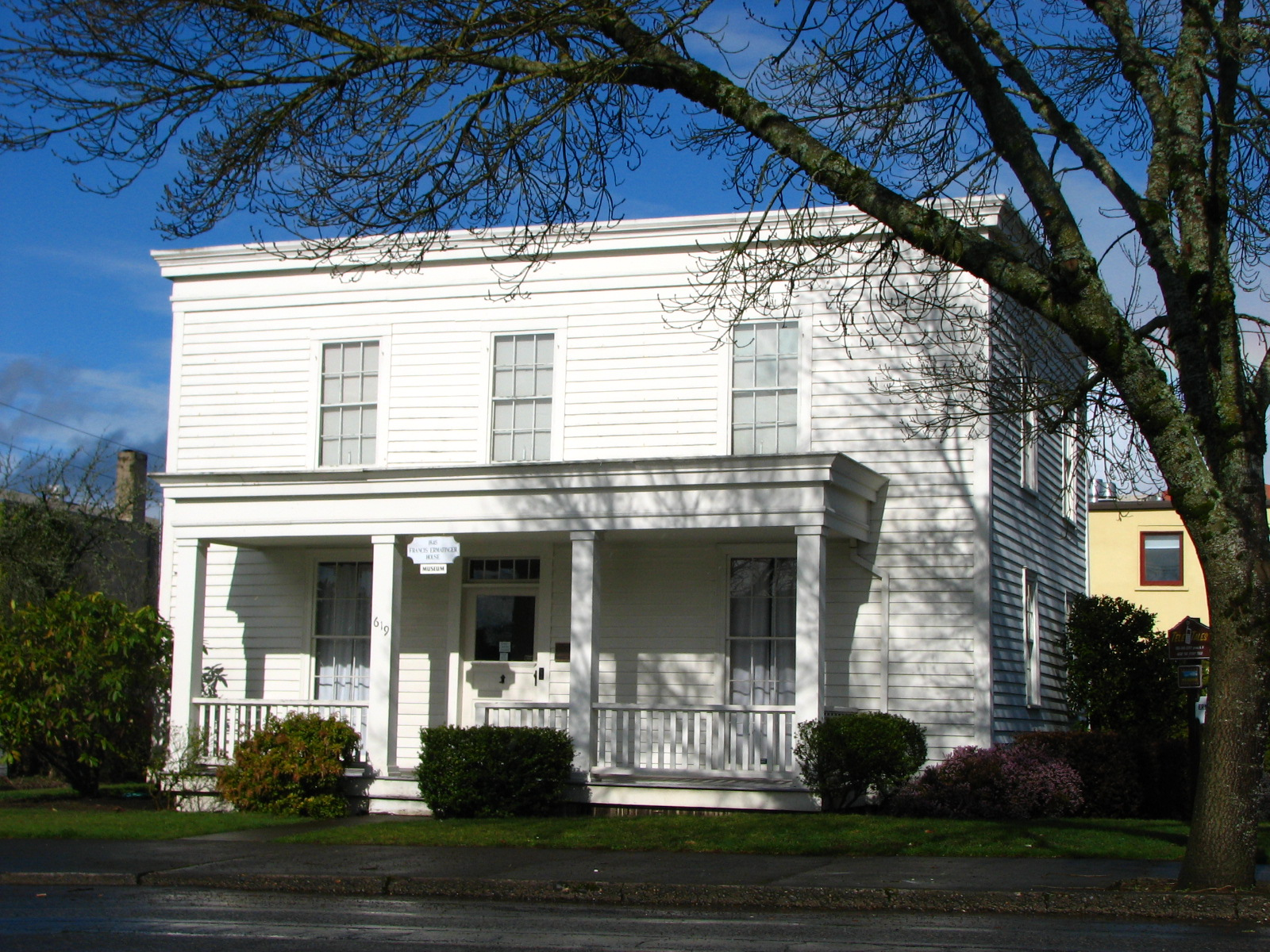
- The Ermatinger House in 2009

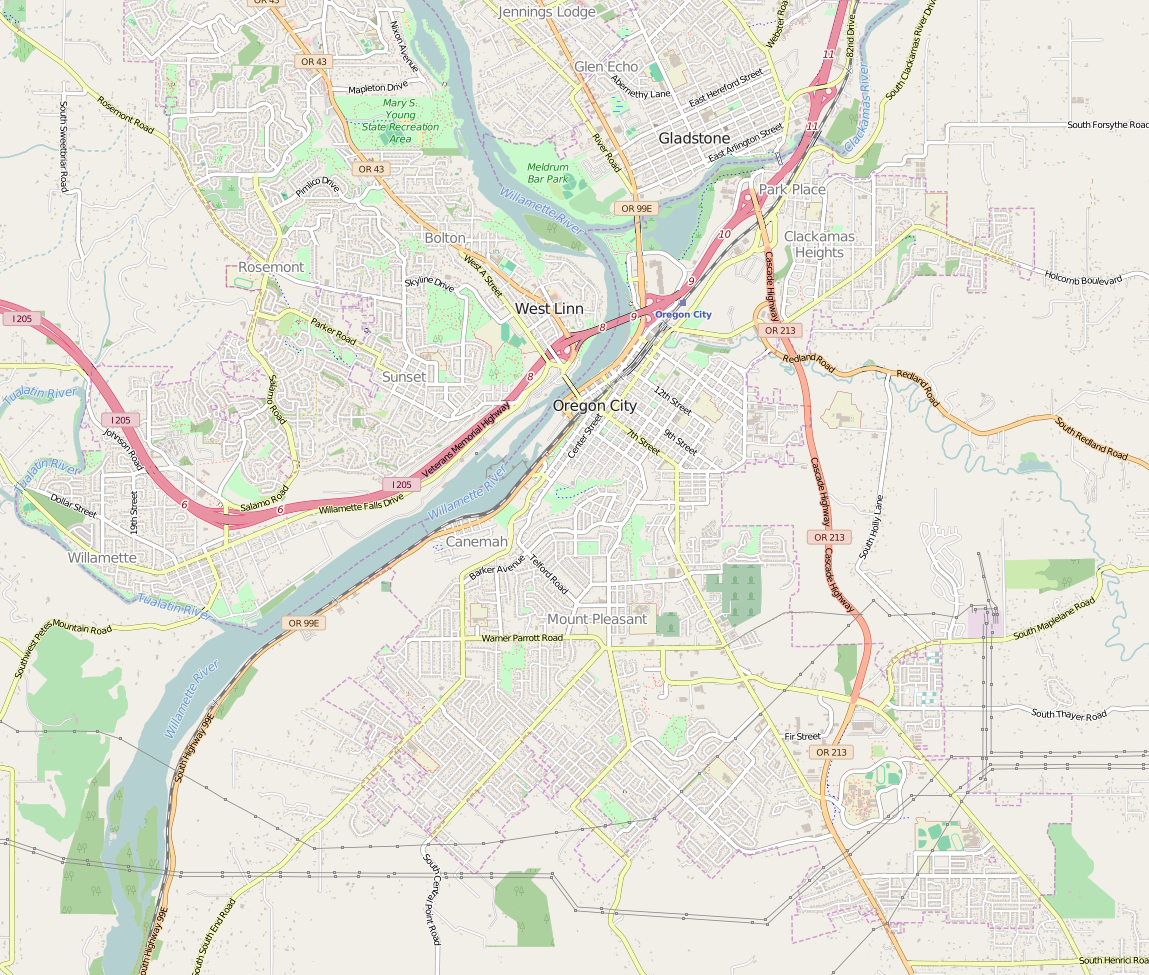
- Location within Oregon City OR Location within Oregon Location within the United States
- Location: 619 6th St. Oregon City, Oregon
- Coordinates: 45°21′20″N 122°36′20″W
- Built: c. 1843
- Architectural style: Greek Revival, Federal Style
- NRHP reference No.: 77001099
- Added to NRHP: 1977

The Francis Ermatinger House is located in Oregon City, Oregon, United States. Built in 1843, it is the third oldest house in Oregon and the oldest house in Clackamas County. It was built for Francis Ermatinger, Chief Trader of the Hudson's Bay Company Columbia District, and later Treasurer of the Provisional Government of Oregon.

The house, initially built on the waterfront near Willamette Falls, has been moved twice in its history, first in 1910 to the corner of 11th and Center streets, and again in 1986 to its current location at the corner of 6th and John Adams streets, adjacent to the Stevens Crawford House museum. It was placed on the National Register of Historic Places in 1977, and has since been operated as a museum.

== History ==
Built in the Greek Revival style, the house was originally located near the Willamette River, in the downtown area near Willamette Falls. Francis Ermatinger, an employee of the Hudson's Bay Company, remained in Oregon City after the company abandoned its operations there in 1845.

The house was moved in 1910 to the corner of 11th and Center streets, and again in 1986 to its current location at the corner of 6th and John Adams streets, adjacent to the Stevens Crawford House museum.

Damage from being moved twice had left the house unstable, resulting in the windows being removed. In 2011, it was closed to the public. After repairs, the house was re-opened on July 7, 2018 by the City of Oregon City Parks and Recreation Department.

The house is open for both guided and self-guided tours of Fridays and Saturdays, with various events held at different times.

=== Portland naming site ===
It is believed to have been the Ermatinger House's left parlor that the famous coin toss between Francis Pettygrove and Asa Lovejoy occurred, reputedly during a dinner party held in the house in 1845. The two were arguing about whether the town they envisioned on their land claim, then called The Clearing, should be incorporated as Boston—Lovejoy's hometown in Massachusetts—or Portland—Pettygrove's hometown in Maine. Pettygrove won two out of three tosses, resulting in the city of Portland, Oregon.

== See also ==
- List of the oldest buildings in Oregon
- List of Oregon's Most Endangered Places
- National Register of Historic Places listings in Clackamas County, Oregon
