= Francis Pettygrove =

Oregon pioneer from Maine credited with naming Portland, Oregon

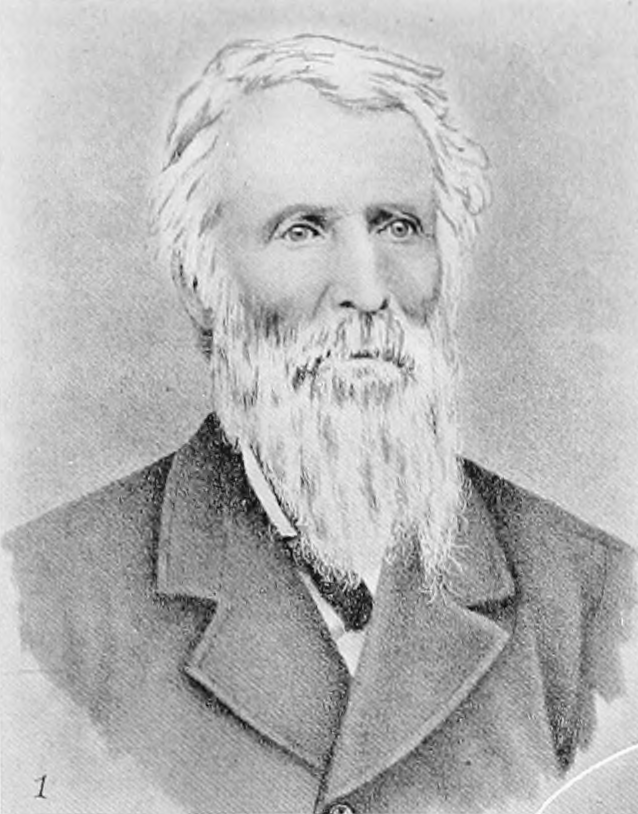
- Born: 1812; Calais, Maine, U.S.
- Died: October 5, 1887 (aged 74–75); Port Townsend, Washington, U.S.
- Resting place: Laurel Grove Cemetery, Port Townsend; 48°07′00″N 122°47′09″W
- Other name: William Pettygrove
- Occupations: Merchant, real-estate investor
- Known for: One of the founders of Portland, Oregon, and Port Townsend, Washington
- Spouse: Sophia Roland Pettygrove

Francis William Pettygrove (c. 1812 – October 5, 1887) was an American pioneer and merchant who was one of the founders of the cities of Portland, Oregon, and Port Townsend, Washington. Born in Maine, he re-located to the Oregon Country in 1843 to establish a store in Oregon City. Later that year he paid $50 for half of a land claim on which he and Asa Lovejoy laid out a town named Portland after the port city in Pettygrove's home state. Lovejoy preferred Boston, but Pettygrove won a coin toss giving him the right to choose the name.

Teamed with Benjamin Stark, who bought Lovejoy's half-interest in the town site in 1845, Pettygrove engaged in a highly profitable three-cornered trade between Portland, San Francisco, and Hawaii. Making money in his stores and warehouses, in trades of lumber, grain, and salted fish, and in real-estate deals, Pettygrove by 1848 was one of the richest men in the Oregon Territory. When the California Gold Rush drew potential laborers from Oregon and threatened Pettygrove's short-term prospects, he sold his assets in Portland and vicinity. In 1851 he joined with others to start a new town, Port Townsend, on Puget Sound in what became the U.S. state of Washington. He died at the age of 75 and was buried in Port Townsend.

Pettygrove was married to Sophia Roland, with whom he had at least two children, one of whom was named after Benjamin Stark. While living in Oregon, he belonged to the Pioneer Lyceum and Literary Club of Oregon City and served as jury foreman in a trial there related to the Cayuse War. Pettygrove Park in southwest Portland and Pettygrove Street in northwest Portland are named after him.

== Early life ==
Pettygrove was born in Calais, Maine. Educated in Maine schools, he worked as a merchant's clerk in New York City before a company there sent him by ship in 1842 to Oregon City to open a store. Oregon City was then part of what was known as the Oregon Country, part of the Pacific Northwest. He and his wife, their child, as well as Pettygrove's sister Mary Charlotte Foster, her husband Philip Foster, and their four children, traveling on the Victoria, an A.G. & A.W. Benson vessel, reached their destination in 1843. Stopping first in Vancouver, Pettygrove arranged with the Hudson's Bay Company (HBC) for a schooner to take his store goods up the Willamette River to Oregon City. There Pettygrove established the agreed-upon store in partnership with George Abernethy. After building a warehouse in Oregon City, Pettygrove began trading in fur and wheat.

== Oregon ==
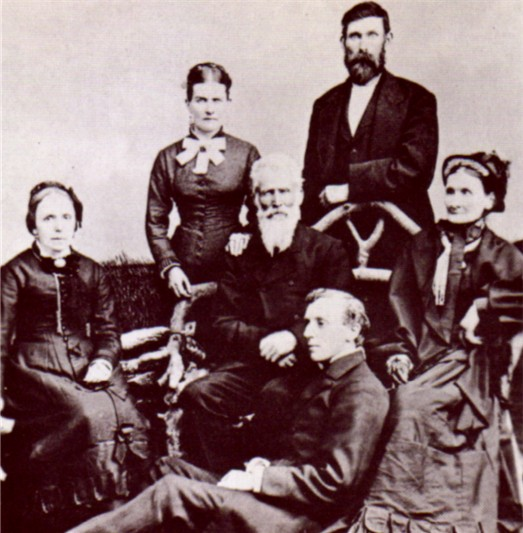
Francis Pettygrove (center) and others

In 1843, Pettygrove paid $50 for 320-acre (1.3 km^{2}) of land owned by William Overton. The tract was along the Willamette River in a place known as The Clearing, 12 miles (19 km) downstream of Oregon City. Pettygrove and Asa Lovejoy, who owned adjoining land, decided to create a town on part of the site. Strongly encouraged by John Couch, a sea captain who considered The Clearing a good site for a river port, they hired Thomas A. Brown in 1845 to plat the town. Brown and his assistant, James Terwilliger, a blacksmith, laid the town out more compactly than usual on a grid of 16 square blocks, 200 feet (61 m) to a side. They allowed 80-foot (24 m) public rights-of-way for north–south streets, 60-foot (18 m) rights-of-way for east–west streets, and no alleys. The short blocks and small rights-of-way created more corner lots than usual and reduced the amount of stump removal needed to create streets. A proliferation of tree stumps on unbuilt lots prompted a derisive nickname for the place, Little Stump Town.

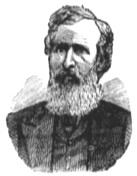
Pettygrove, 1876

Lovejoy and Pettygrove, who could not agree on a name for the town, held a best-two-of-three coin toss won by Pettygrove, who named the town after Portland, Maine. Had Lovejoy won, he would have named it after Boston, Massachusetts. The two men cleared trees and debris from the site. Pettygrove built a small log store near the river, hired a married couple to run it, and commissioned the building of a wharf. He also acquired a granary and boat landing at Champoeg, site of the Oregon Country's first provisional government.

In late 1845, Lovejoy sold his half-interest in the townsite (and his half-interest in a cattle herd he owned jointly with Pettygrove) to Benjamin Stark, who was the agent in charge of merchandise being shipped from Benson & Company, Pettygrove's supplier in New York, to Pettygrove's warehouse in Portland. Stark, the supercargo (cargo supervisor), arrived in Portland on Captain Nathaniel Crosby's Toulon. The three men then arranged to have Stark act as Pettygrove's supercargo on the Toulon, trading lumber, wheat, salted fish, and other goods between San Francisco, Honolulu, and Portland. Adding a second ship, the Mariposa, for a short time they controlled much of the trade in and out of Oregon.

The two men engaged in projects by land as well as sea. Among these were construction of a wagon road on the east side of the Willamette between Portland and Oregon City and a wagon track along an 11.5-mile (18.5 km) route, surveyed by Brown, between Portland and the farmlands of the Tualatin Plains to the west. To increase profits from cattle, Pettygrove built a slaughterhouse along the river and sold hides to Daniel H. Lownsdale, who had opened the first tannery on the Pacific Coast on a tract just west of the town site. Fiercely competitive, Pettygrove and Stark drove others, including Couch, who had his own store in Oregon City, out of business by monopolizing trade between Portland and Hawaii, charging high rates to import goods for others and raising the price of imported salt to gain control of the salmon trade.

In 1847, after the United States and the United Kingdom had negotiated a boundary treaty dividing the Oregon Country between them, thousands of pioneers entered the Oregon Territory, the part of the Oregon Country ceded to the U.S., most of them settling in the Willamette Valley. Meanwhile, after an apparent disagreement with Pettygrove, Stark returned temporarily to New England, and Pettygrove took control of the entire town site. By 1848, Pettygrove "was one of the wealthiest residents of the territory". During that year, the California Gold Rush attracted so many men from Oregon that it caused an Oregon labor shortage. Seeing little hope of further short-term growth in Portland, Pettygrove began selling his assets. While Stark was out of town, Pettygrove sold the entire 640-acre (260 ha) townsite, including Stark's share, to Daniel H. Lownsdale for $5,000 worth of leather. This netted Pettygrove a one-hundredfold profit for his original $50 investment.

== Washington ==
In 1851, Pettygrove and L.B. Hastings, another businessman, decided to establish a new town on the west side of the entrance to Puget Sound in the U.S. state of Washington. Scouting the area for a likely spot, they met Alfred A. Plummer and Charles Bachelder, who had filed land claims near a bay on the northeastern corner of the Olympic Peninsula. After the four agreed to found a city on this site, Pettygrove and Hastings returned to Oregon for their families and other settlers and returned to what became Port Townsend. Pettygrove died there in 1887 and is buried in Laurel Grove Cemetery.

== Other interests, legacy ==
Pettygrove married Sophia Roland in 1842. By 1845 they had two children, the first of whom had been born in the Sandwich Islands (Hawaiian Islands), where they stopped on the way to Oregon. The second child, named Benjamin Stark Pettygrove, was the first boy of European descent born in Portland.

Pettygrove was a member of the Pioneer Lyceum and Literary Club in Oregon City. In May 1850, he was the jury foreman in the Oregon City trial and subsequent hanging of five men from the Cayuse tribe of Native Americans who were accused of murder committed during the Cayuse War.

Lovejoy and Pettygrove used a copper Matron Head penny, dated 1835, in their coin flip to determine Portland's name. Pettygrove bequeathed this penny to the Oregon Historical Society in his will.

Pettygrove Park, an 0.8-acre (0.32 ha) tract in downtown Portland, is named for him. It is one of two nearly adjacent parks developed in the 1960s in an urban renewal area. The same coin that Lovejoy and Pettygrove flipped to decide who should name the city was flipped to decide which park would be Lovejoy and which would be Pettygrove. Lovejoy Fountain Park, which features water cascades, is about 300 yards (270 m) from Pettygrove Park, which features grass mounds, trees, paths, and stonework. Pettygrove Street in northwest Portland is also named for him.

== See also ==
- History of Portland, Oregon

== Works cited ==
- Corning, Howard McKinley, ed. (1989) [1956]. "Pettygrove, Francis W." in Dictionary of Oregon History (2nd ed.). Portland, Oregon: Binford & Mort Publishing. ISBN 0-8323-0449-2.
- Lansing, Jewel (2005) [2003]. Portland: People, Politics, and Power, 1851–2001 (1st paperback ed.). Corvallis, Oregon: Oregon State University Press. ISBN 0-87071-559-3.
- MacColl, E. Kimbark; Stein, Harry H. (1988). Merchants, Money, and Power: The Portland Establishment 1843–1913. Portland, Oregon: The Georgian Press. ISBN 0-9603408-4-X.
- Snyder, Eugene E. (1979). Portland Names and Neighborhoods: Their Historic Origins (softcover ed.). Portland, Oregon: Binford & Mort Publishing. ISBN 0-8323-0351-8.
