= Portland Penny =

Name given to copper matron head penny

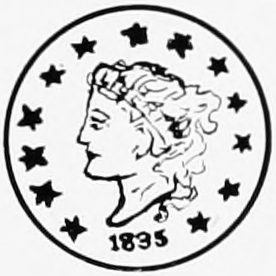
Portland Penny

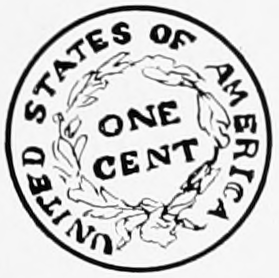
(back)

The Portland Penny is the name subsequently given to a specific copper matron head one-cent coin, used to decide the name of Portland, Oregon. The City of Portland's two founders, Francis Pettygrove from Portland, Maine, and Asa Lovejoy from Boston, Massachusetts, both wanted to name the fledgling site—then known as The Clearing—after their respective home towns. The coin toss was decided in 1845 with two out of three tosses which Pettygrove won. Portland was incorporated in 1851.

The coin, minted in 1835, was found in a safe deposit box left behind by Lovejoy and is now on display in the Oregon Historical Society Museum.

== Location ==
Multiple versions of the coin-toss location have been proposed. It is agreed that the event happened in an Oregon City home in 1845. But the exact home was never explicitly stated at the time.

Most historians believe the coin toss occurred in the Francis Ermatinger House, the home of Hudson's Bay Company Chief Trader Francis Ermatinger. Because of this and the fact that the Ermatinger House is the only remaining house of that early period, it is the site officially used to celebrate the event.

Some also theorize that the coin toss occurred in the house of Judge Albert E. Wilson.
