= Proof of Fermat's Last Theorem =

Proof of Fermat's last theorem may refer to:

- Wiles's proof of Fermat's Last Theorem
- Proof of Fermat's Last Theorem for specific exponents
