= Jenny Plocki =

French women's rights activist (1925–2026)

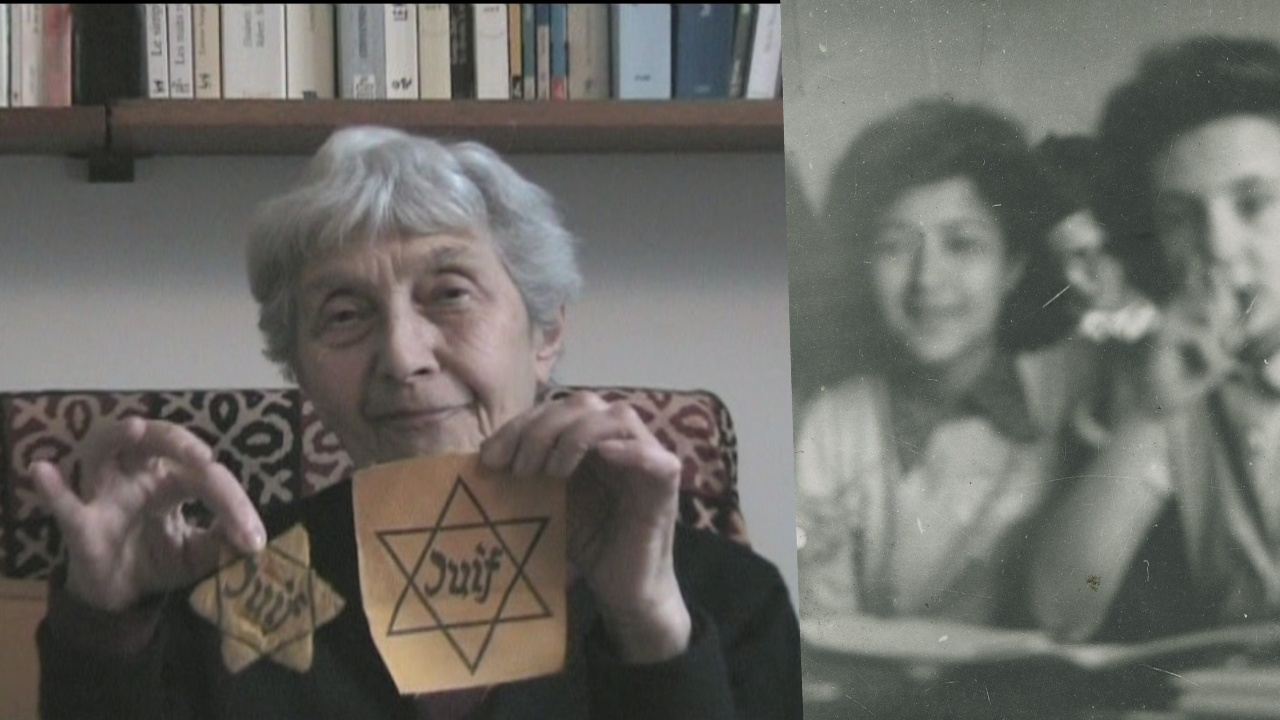
- Plocki in 2012
- Born: Eugénie Plocki; 11 December 1925; Paris, France
- Died: 3 January 2026 (aged 100)
- Occupations: Activist, teacher

Eugénie "Jenny" Plocki (French: [øʒeni "ʒeni" plɔki]; 11 December 1925 – 3 January 2026) was a French left-wing and women's rights activist and Holocaust survivor.

== Biography ==
The daughter of Polish Jews, Nuchim and Rifka (née Rajsfus) Plocki, she survived the Holocaust when police let her and her brother, Maurice, who later took his mother's maiden name), go during the Vel' d'Hiv roundup, though Nuchim and Rifka would perish at Auschwitz. She survived the war with her brother in their parents' apartment, living off meager allowances and help from friends as the landlord refused to lower the rent despite the siblings' plight. She studied at the Lycée Sophie Germain, passed her Baccalauréat and became a teacher.

After the war, she campaigned for left-wing causes, such as Algerian independence and anti-colonialism. She contributed to the magazine Socialisme ou barbarie, which was founded by philosophers Cornelius Castoriadis and Claude Lefort. Engaged with feminist movements, she was involved with the Mouvement pour la liberté de l'avortement et de la contraception.

Eugénie "Jenny" Plocki died on 3 January 2026, at the age of 100.
