= Victor-Amédée Lebesgue =

French mathematician

- Born: 2 October 1791; Grandvilliers, Oise, France
- Died: 10 June 1875 (aged 83); Bordeaux, France
- Scientific career
- Fields: Mathematics

Victor-Amédée Lebesgue (2 October 1791 – 10 June 1875; sometimes written Le Besgue) was a French mathematician working on number theory.

Lebesgue was born in Grandvilliers, Oise in 1791. He was elected a member of the Académie des sciences in 1847. He died in Bordeaux, Gironde, in 1875.

== See also ==
- Catalan's conjecture
- Proof of Fermat's Last Theorem for specific exponents
- Lebesgue–Nagell type equations

== Publications ==
- Lebesgue, Victor-Amédée (1837), Thèses de mécanique et d'astronomie
- Lebesgue, Victor-Amédée (1859), Exercices d'analyse numérique
- Lebesgue, Victor-Amédée (1862), Introduction à la théorie des nombres, Paris
- Lebesgue, Victor Amédée (1864), Tables diverses pour le décomposition des nombres en leurs facteurs premiers
