= Joseph Marie de Pernety =

French artillery general

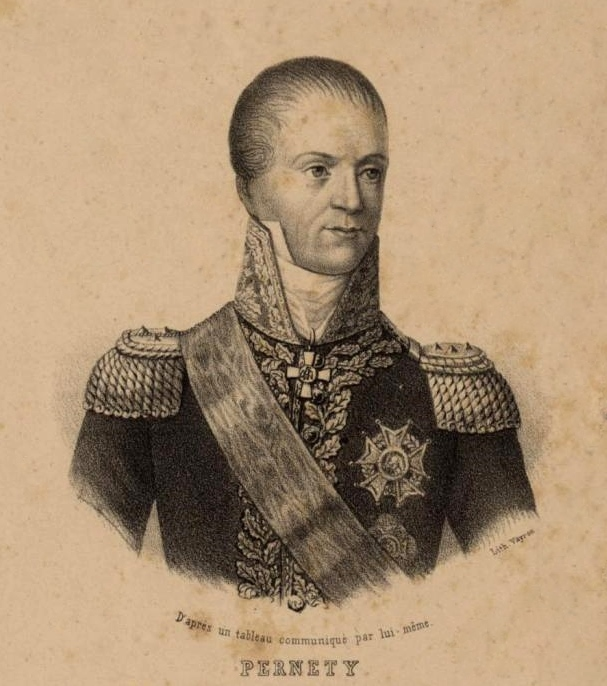
- Born: 19 May 1766; Lyon
- Died: 29 April 1856 (aged 89) 11th arrondissement, Paris
- Branch: Artillery
- Service years: 1781 – 1832
- Rank: Major General
- Awards: Baron de l'Empire Grand officier de la Légion d'honneur Grand-croix de l'Ordre militaire de Maximilien-Joseph de Bavière Grand-croix de l'ordre de la Réunion Chevalier de Saint-Louis

Joseph Marie de Pernety (19 May 1766 – 29 April 1856) was a French general during the Revolution and the Empire.

== Biography ==
=== Youth and early career under the ancien régime ===
The son of Maurice-Jacques Pernety, Receiver general for Lyon, and Françoise Gardelle. He was educated at the military school of Tournon. He entered the artillery school of Metz as an artillery midshipman on 1 June 1781, and on 1 June 1782 was a pupil at the same school. Appointed lieutenant on 1 September 1783 to the La Fère artillery regiment, he was promoted to the Grenoble regiment and made first lieutenant in the corps on 17 June 1788.

=== During the French Revolution ===
Second-in-command in the 4th foot artillery regiment on 1 April 1791, he fought in the 1792 campaign in the Italian Army and was promoted on 1 February of that year to the command of a company in his regiment. Pernety distinguished himself by his bravery and talents in the defence of Belvedere and the capture of Saorgio on 7 May 1794. In 1796, he was appointed director of the field for the siege of Mantoue and then commissioner for the purpose of receiving the artillery for this fortress. He also took part in the battles of Bassano, Arcole and Rivoli. During the latter, he had a horse killed beneath him and was promoted to battalion commander on the field. Confirmed in this rank as a supernumerary, he moved to the 8th foot artillery regiment in the year VII (1798–99). He was part of the Brest division that left in late 1796 for the expedition to Ireland, where he served as artillery commander under General Jean Hardy. He was taken prisoner by the Royal Navy following an unsuccessful battle with the ship Le Hoche.

Returning to France three months later, Pernety commanded the artillery of the Watrin division and took the first cannon "to Mont Saint-Bernard" on 18 and 20 May 1800. Along with Lieutenant Marion and four gunners, he relieved a caisson blocking the descent near Fort de Bard. Pernety then took part in the battles of Casteggio and Marengo. Following this encounter, the Austrians commissioned him to take charge of the artillery at Alexandria. Made colonel of the 1st foot artillery regiment in Vendémiaire, Year XI (August/September 1802), he commanded the artillery that entered Switzerland under the orders of General Ney and served there without interruption until the end of Year XII (September 1804).

=== General of the Empire ===
Appointed a member of the Légion d'honneur on 19 Frimaire (11 December 1803) of that year, then an officer of the order on 25 Prairial (14 June 1804), Pernety was raised to the rank of brigadier general on 1 February 1805 and served in the Grande Armée during the campaigns of 1805 to 1807. He was present at the battles of Ulm, Austerlitz and Jena, and directed the siege of Breslau with great talent and activity. When General Vandamme converted the siege of the town of Neiss into a blockade in April 1807, due to the transfer of the artillery available in Silesia to Danzig, Pernety managed to assemble and train a small fleet of 20 guns at Schweidnitz with which the siege work could resume.

==== Carl Friedrich Gauss ====
After Jena, as the Grande Armée approached Brunswick, the home of Carl Friedrich Gauss, he was contacted by a family friend, the mathematician Sophie Germain, who worried that Gauss might die in the war, comparing him to Archimedes. De Pernety took steps to ensure he was safe - though the explanation for this was met with a blank response from Gauss, who had never heard of a Sophie Germain. Germain later clarified in a letter: "General Pernety informed me that he made my name to you. This leads me to confess that I am not as unknown to you as you may think, because, fearing the sense of ridicule associated with a female scientist, I previously preferred to adopt the name Monsieur Le Blanc to communicate to you those notes you had indulged me in reading..."

Awarded Commander of the Legion of Honour on 3 May and Major General on 11 July, he was awarded the Commander's Cross of the Military Order of Maximilian Joseph of Bavaria by the King of Bavaria. In 1809 Pernety commanded the artillery of the 4th corps in the army of Germany under the orders of Marshal Masséna, and had the necessary boat bridges built across the Danube to capture the island of Lobau. After the battle of Essling, he took charge of the artillery on the island, which he surrounded with strong batteries. During the battle of Wagram, Marshal Masséna publicly praised General Pernety, who was created a Baron of the Empire and Grand Officer of the Legion of Honour on 21 July of the same year.

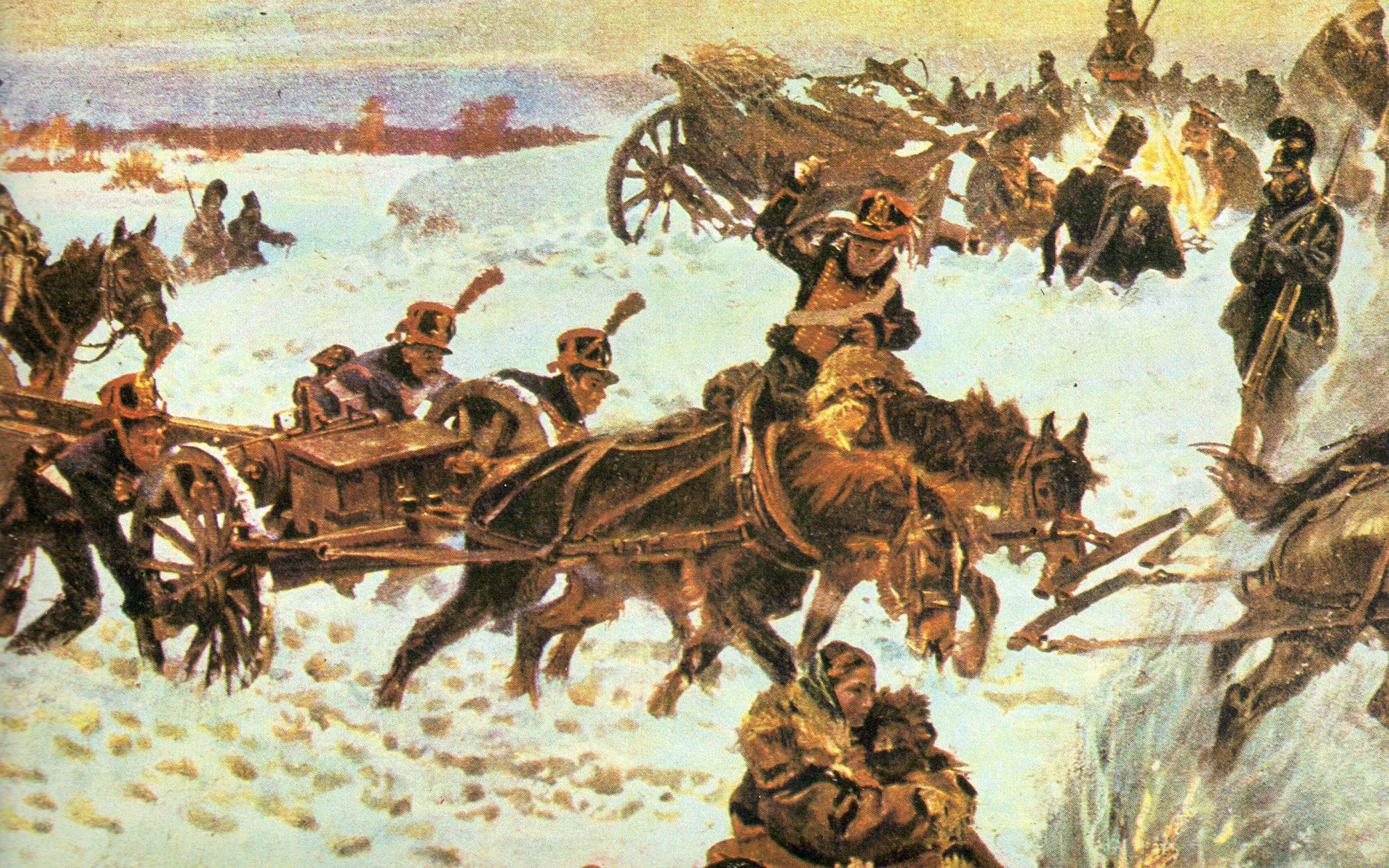
French artillery during the retreat from Russia in 1812, by Wojciech Kossak.

In 1810, after the peace, he carried out the mission of drawing the border between Austria and Bavaria, and on this occasion received the Grand Cross from Maximilian Joseph of Bavaria. Commander of the artillery in Hamburg, he was replaced there on March 14, 1811, by Basile Baltus de Pouilly. He then moved to the Grande Armée to take part in the Russian campaign in 1812. On September 5, 1812, he took charge of the Compans division, with 30 artillery pieces and marched along a treeline, turning the enemy's position. He had the honor of starting the Battle of Borodino and contributing to the capture of the Russian redoubts with skillfully directed fire. On the 25th of the same month, he took command of the artillery of the cavalry reserves and brought it back almost entirely to beyond the Berezina. However, many men and horses fell victim to the cold. On March 11, 1813, Pernety obtained second command of the artillery of the Grande Armée. In this capacity he rendered important services at the battles of Lützen and Bautzen, so much so that he received the Grand Cross of the Order of Reunion on May 3. The battles of Dresden, Leipzig and Hanau allowed him to distinguish himself again.

=== Bourbon Restoration ===
Louis XVIII named him knight of Saint-Louis on June 27, 1814, and inspector general of artillery in Grenoble and Valence. During the Bourbon Restoration in France, Pernety was director of artillery at the Ministry of War from October 1815 to August 1816, state advisor attached to the War Committee, viscount on February 12, 1817, and president of the artillery committee, member of the War Committee on April 9. The following year, the king made him inspector general of artillery and president of the Central Artillery Committee in his capacity as the most senior lieutenant general. On May 1, 1821, he received the Grand Cross of the Legion of Honor.

Placed on leave in 1824 and admitted to retirement as lieutenant-general on June 11, 1832, he was appointed peer of France on September 11, 1835. He sat relatively little in the Senate and lived in retirement when he was appointed senator under the Second Empire on June 19, 1854. His name is inscribed on the Arc de Triomphe in Paris, on the south side.

== Published works ==
He is the author of a manuscript related to card games, a vademecum or guide for whist players, published in 1839.

== Tributes and honours ==
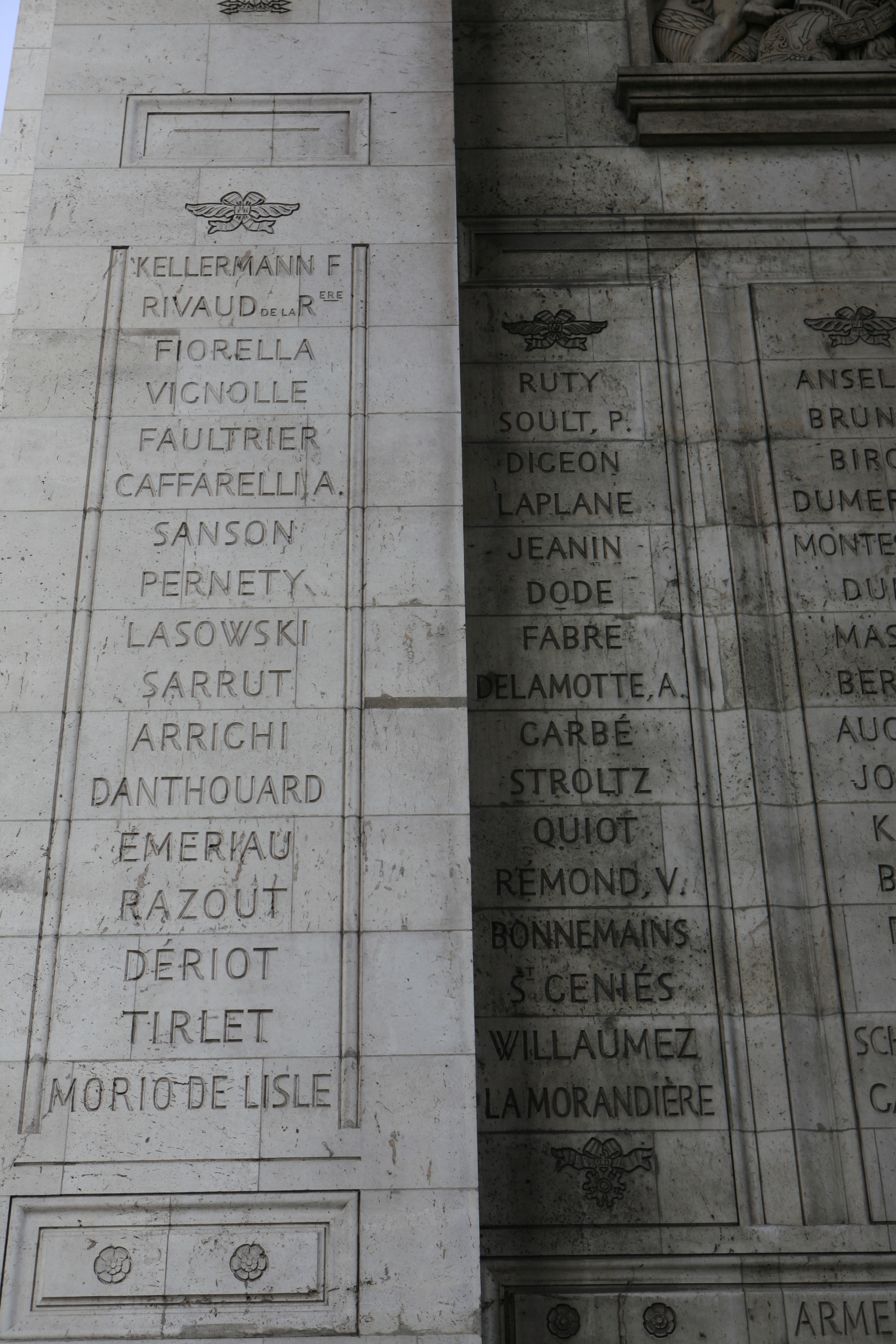
Names engraved on the 21st column of the triumphal arch.

Order of the Legion of Honour:

- Chevalier: 19 frimaire of year XII (11 December 1803).
- Officer: 25 prairial of year XII (14 June 1804).
- Commander: 3 May 1807.
- Grand Cross: 1 May 1821.
- Grand Cross of the Order of Military Merit Maximilien-Joseph.
- Knight Second Class of the Order of the Red Eagle (Prussia).
- Pernety metro station, named after the rue Pernety, which pays tribute to the viscount who owned the land on which the street was built.
- The name "PERNETY" is engraved on the south side (21st column) of the Arc de Triomphe de l'Étoile in Paris.
