= Lycée Sophie Germain =

Educational facility in Paris, France

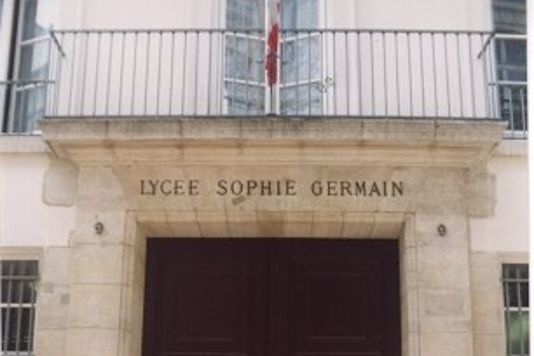
The entrance to the lycée at 9, rue de Jouy in Paris.

The lycée Sophie-Germain is a public, general and technology lycée in the 4th arrondissement of Paris. It was historically the lycée Charlemagne for girls.

According to the French Ministry de National Education, the lycée Sophie Germain is the fourth best public lycée of Paris.

== Location and access ==
The lycée is located at 9, rue de Jouy, 300 metres from lycée Charlemagne.

== Origin of its name ==
It takes its name from French mathematician, physicist, and philosopher Sophie Germain who lived in Paris. A group in stone, La Famille, by Louis Armand Barbery and a marble bust of Sophie Germain adorn the lycée courtyard.

== History ==
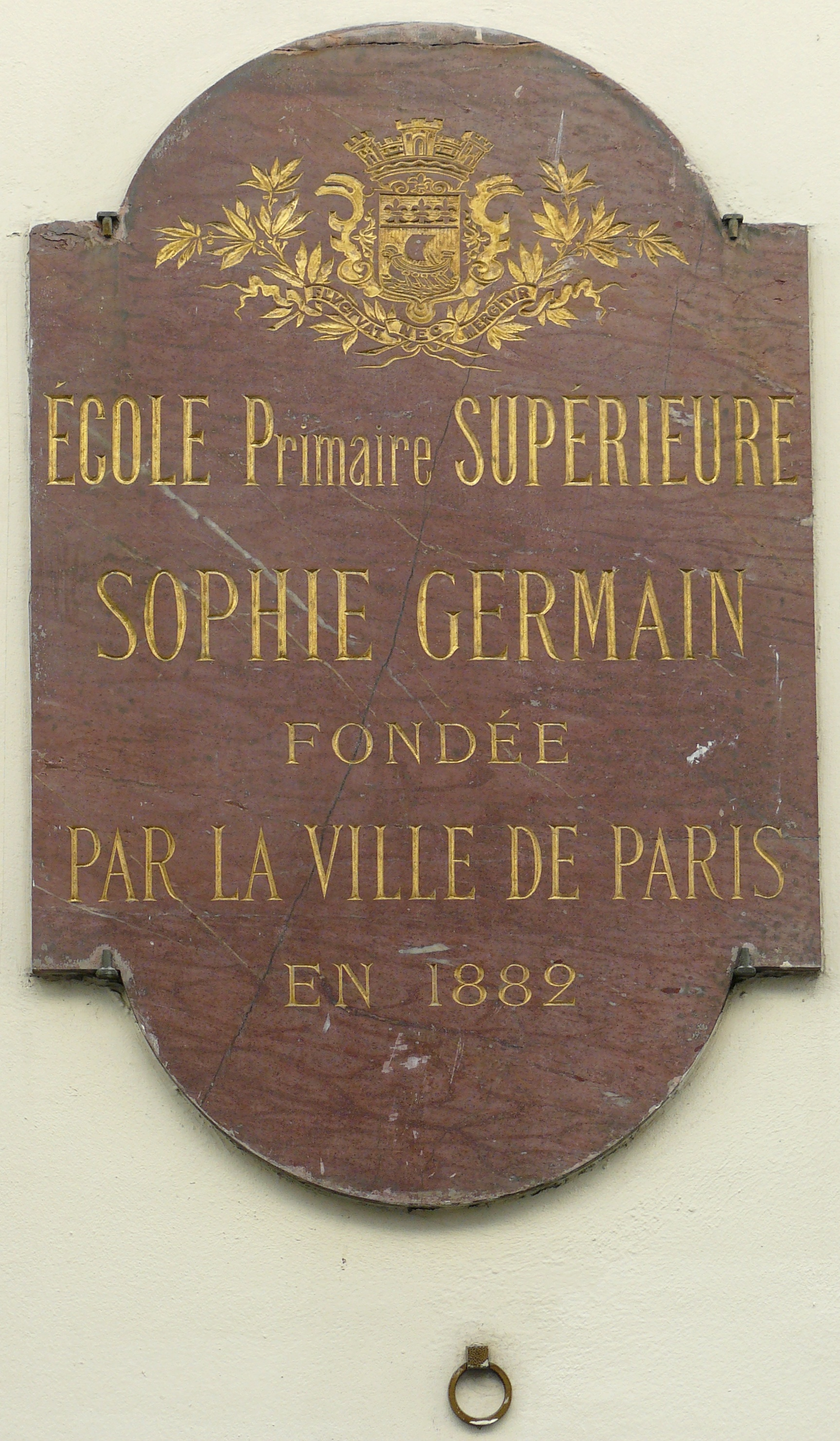
Commemorative plaque on the façade of the lycée.

The buildings were originally part of the Hermitage, which then became the hôtel de Fourcy. In 1827, the hotel was loaned to the Institution Petit, then in 1858 to the pension Harent boarding house which housed students from the lycée Charlemagne. In 1880, the locals opened a female primary school, the first in Paris, and the City of Paris bought the building in 1882. Starting with 65 students, the school had 425 in 1900. In 1888, the name of Sophie Germain was given to the school.

Originally a female annex to the lycée Charlemagne close by, the establishment became independent in the 1970s. In 1979, the first class started the lycée and the attendance was up to 1000 students.
