= Karel Rychlík =

Czech mathematician (1885–1968)

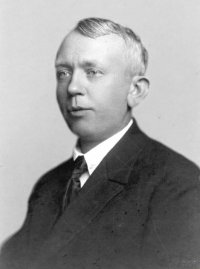
Rychlík in 1926

Karel Rychlík (Czech pronunciation: [ˈkarɛl ˈrɪxliːk]; 16 August 1885 – 28 May 1968) was a Czech mathematician. He contributed significantly to the fields of algebra, number theory, mathematical analysis, and the history of mathematics.

== Life ==
Rychlík was born on 16 August 1885 in Benešov. His family moved frequently, so he attended secondary schools in Chrudim, Benešov and Prague. From 1904, he studied mathematics and physics for secondary school teaching at the University of Prague. The mathematician Karel Petr had a great influence on him, and Rychlík enthusiastically attended his lectures. In 1907–08, he was on a study stay in France and attended Faculté des sciences de Paris. He graduated in 1908, and after receiving his PhD title there in 1909, he became an assistant at the university.

Rychlík's friend and later brother-in-law was the artist Václav Špála. Rychlík married Marie (née Benešová) in 1918. They had a daughter, Marie (born 1923).

From 1913, Rychlík worked at the Prague Polytechnical Institute (from 1920 known as Czech Technical University in Prague). In 1923, he became a full professor at the university. In 1940, the universities were closed down and Rychlík never returned to teaching. At the end of his life he remained active and devoted himself to processing Bernard Bolzano's writings. He died of bladder cancer on 28 May 1968 in Prague and is buried at the Prague's Olšany Cemetery.
