= Sophie Germain's theorem =

On the divisibility of solutions to Fermat's Last Theorem for prime exponent

In number theory, Sophie Germain's theorem is a statement about the divisibility of solutions to the equation $x^p + y^p = z^p$ of Fermat's Last Theorem for odd prime $p$.

== Formal statement ==
Specifically, Sophie Germain proved that at least one of the numbers $x$, $y$, $z$ must be divisible by $p^2$ if an auxiliary prime $q$ can be found such that two conditions are satisfied:

1. No two nonzero $p^{\mathrm{th}}$ powers differ by one modulo $q$; and
2. $p$ is itself not a $p^{\mathrm{th}}$ power modulo $q$.

Conversely, the first case of Fermat's Last Theorem (the case in which $p$ does not divide $xyz$) must hold for every prime $p$ for which even one auxiliary prime can be found.

== History ==
Germain identified such an auxiliary prime $q$ for every prime less than 100. The theorem and its application to primes $p$ less than 100 were attributed to Germain by Adrien-Marie Legendre in 1823.

== General proof of the theorem ==
While the auxiliary prime $q$ has nothing to do with the divisibility by $n$ and must also divide either $x$,$y$ or $z$ for which the violation of the Fermat Theorem would occur and most likely the conjecture is true that for given $n$ the auxiliary prime may be arbitrarily large similarly to the Mersenne primes she most likely proved the theorem in the general case by her considerations by infinite ascent because then at least one of the numbers $x$,$y$ or $z$ must be arbitrarily large if divisible by infinite number of divisors and so all by the equality then they do not exist.

== See also ==
- Sophie Germain's identity
- Sophie Germain Primes
