= Star of Oregon =

Star of Oregon may refer to:

- Star of Oregon (event), commercial enterprise that brought cattle to the U.S. state of Oregon 1840–1843
- Star of Oregon (ship), American vessel built in 1840–1842
- SS Star of Oregon, American Liberty Ship launched in 1941
