= SS Patrick Henry =

Liberty ship of WWII

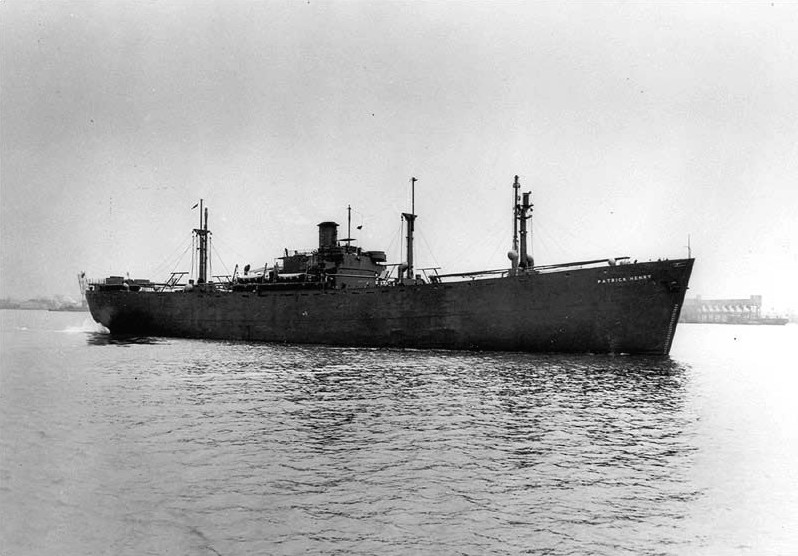
- Patrick Henry September 1941

History

United States
- Name: Patrick Henry
- Namesake: Patrick Henry
- Owner: War Shipping Administration (WSA)
- Operator: Lykes Brothers Steamship Co., Inc.
- Ordered: as type (EC2-S-C1) hull, MCE hull 14
- Awarded: 14 March 1941
- Builder: Bethlehem-Fairfield Shipyard, Baltimore, Maryland
- Cost: $1,613,203
- Yard number: 2001
- Way number: 1
- Laid down: 30 April 1941
- Launched: 27 September 1941
- Sponsored by: Ilo Browne Wallace
- Completed: 30 December 1941
- Identification: Call sign: KIVU
- Fate: Grounded off Florida, July 1946; Laid up in the National Defense Reserve Fleet, Mobile, Alabama, 22 August 1946; Sold for scrapping, 18 September 1958, withdrawn from fleet, 22 October 1958

General characteristics
- Class & type: Liberty ship; type EC2-S-C1, standard
- Tonnage: 10,865 LT DWT; 7,176 GRT
- Displacement: 3,380 long tons (3,434 t) (light); 14,245 long tons (14,474 t) (max)
- Length: 441 feet 6 inches (135 m) oa; 416 feet (127 m) pp; 427 feet (130 m) lwl
- Beam: 57 feet (17 m)
- Draft: 27 ft 9.25 in (8.4646 m)
- Installed power: 2 × Oil fired 450 °F (232 °C) boilers, operating at 220 psi (1,500 kPa); 2,500 hp (1,900 kW)
- Propulsion: 1 × triple-expansion steam engine, (manufactured by General Machinery Corp., Hamilton, Ohio); 1 × screw propeller
- Speed: 11.5 knots (21.3 km/h; 13.2 mph)
- Capacity: 562,608 cubic feet (15,931 m^{3}) (grain); 499,573 cubic feet (14,146 m^{3}) (bale)
- Complement: 38–62 USMM; 21–40 USNAG
- Armament: Varied by ship; Bow-mounted 3-inch (76 mm)/50-caliber gun; Stern-mounted 4-inch (102 mm)/50-caliber gun; 2–8 × single 20-millimeter (0.79 in) Oerlikon anti-aircraft (AA) cannons and/or, 2–8 × 37-millimeter (1.46 in) M1 AA guns

SS Patrick Henry was the first Liberty ship launched. It was built by the Bethlehem Shipbuilding Corporation at their Bethlehem-Fairfield Shipyard in Baltimore, Maryland. She was named after Patrick Henry, an American attorney, planter, and Founding Father as well as the first and sixth post-colonial Governor of Virginia, from 1776 to 1779 and 1784 to 1786.

== Background ==
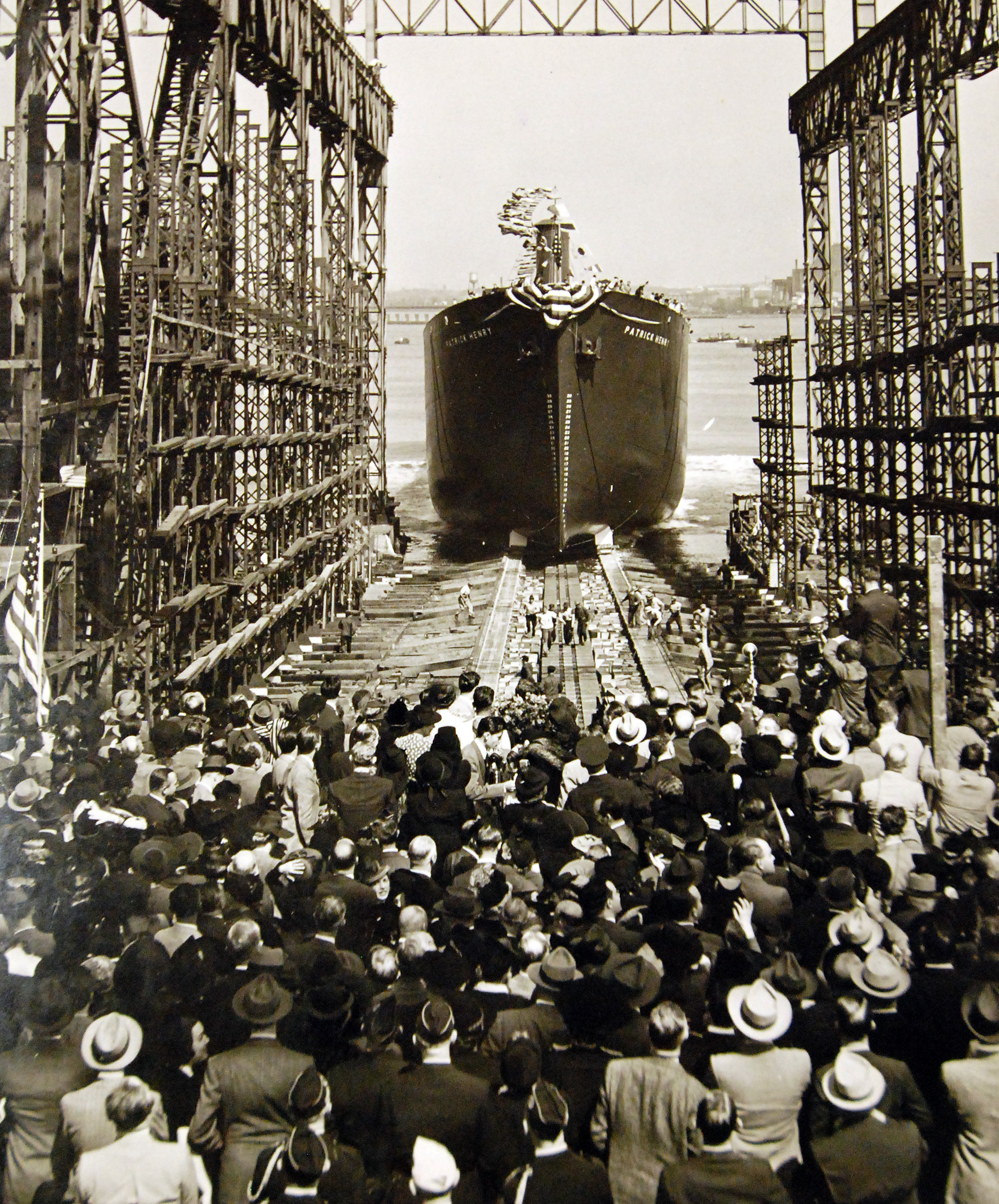
Patrick Henry launching on Liberty Fleet Day

Liberty ships initially had a poor public image and to try to assuage public opinion, 27 September 1941, was designated Liberty Fleet Day, and the first 14 "Emergency" vessels were launched that day. The first of these (with MC hull number 14) was Patrick Henry, launched by President Franklin D. Roosevelt. Other "Emergency" vessels launched that day, in various yards around the country included: SS John C. Fremont, SS Louise Lykes, SS Ocean Venture, SS Ocean Voice, SS Star of Oregon, and SS Steel Artisan.

== Launching ==
In the speech delivered at the launching, Roosevelt referred to Patrick Henry's "Give me Liberty or give me Death!" speech of 23 March 1775. Roosevelt said that this new class of ships would bring liberty to Europe, which gave rise to the name "Liberty ship". Patrick Henry was sponsored by Ilo Browne Wallace, wife of Vice President Henry A. Wallace, with Mrs. Robert H. Jackson, wife of the Associate Justice of the Supreme Court of the United States, and Madame Bruggmann, wife of the Minister of Switzerland Karl Bruggmann and sister of the vice president. Ilo Wallace christened the ship. The ship's fitting was completed on 30 December 1941.

== Service history ==
Her maiden voyage was to the Middle East. During World War II she made 12 voyages to ports including Murmansk (as part of Convoy PQ 18), Trinidad, Cape Town, Naples, and Dakar.

She survived the war, but was seriously damaged when she went aground on a reef off the coast of Florida, 25°08′N 80°16′W, in July 1946. The ship was laid up at National Defense Reserve Fleet, Mobile, Alabama. On 18 September 1958, she was sold to Bethlehem Steel, for $76,191. She was withdrawn from the fleet on 22 October 1958, and was scrapped at Baltimore.

== Bibliography ==
- "Bethlehem-Fairfield, Baltimore MD". www.ShipbuildingHistory.com. 14 August 2008.
- Maritime Administration. "Patrick Henry". Ship History Database Vessel Status Card. U.S. Department of Transportation, Maritime Administration.
- Davies, James (May 2004). "Specifications (As-Built)" (PDF). p. 23.
- "SS Patrick Henry".
- "The Patrick Henry" (PDF). TS Vindicatrix Association : Iconic Ships. 2010. Archived from the original (PDF) on 29 August 2013.
- Hague, Arnold (2009). "Ports database". convoyweb.org.uk.
- Sawyer, L.A.; Mitchell, W.H. (1985). The Liberty Ships: The History of the 'Emergency' Type Cargo Ships Constructed in the United States During the Second World War (2nd ed.). London: Lloyd's of London Press Ltd. ISBN 1-85044-049-2.
