= HM LST-428 =

1942 LST-1-class tank landing ship

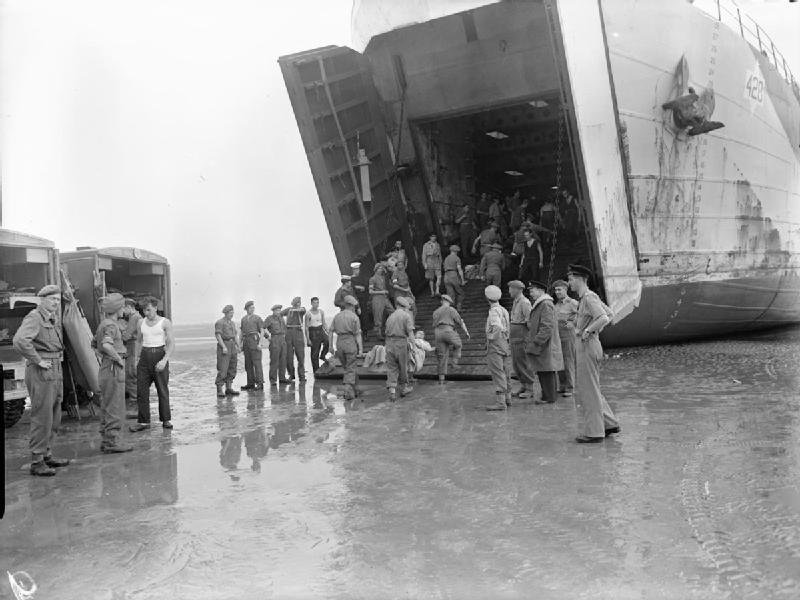
- HM LST-428 beached at Courseulles, France, in August 1944, while loading casualties. HM LST-428 had been converted to transport casualties back to the United Kingdom.

History

United Kingdom
- Name: LST-428
- Ordered: as a Type S3-M-K2 hull, MCE hull 948
- Builder: Bethlehem-Fairfield Shipyard, Baltimore, Maryland
- Yard number: 2200
- Laid down: 22 November 1942
- Launched: 22 December 1942
- Commissioned: 9 February 1943
- Decommissioned: 10 June 1946
- Identification: Hull symbol: LST-428
- Fate: Returned to USN custody, 10 June 1946

United States
- Name: LST-428
- Acquired: 10 June 1946
- Stricken: 19 July 1946
- Fate: Sold for scrapping, 10 October 1947

General characteristics
- Class & type: LST-1-class tank landing ship
- Displacement: 4,080 long tons (4,145 t) full load; 2,160 long tons (2,190 t) landing
- Length: 328 ft (100 m) oa
- Beam: 50 ft (15 m)
- Draft: Full load: 8 ft 2 in (2.49 m) forward; 14 ft 1 in (4.29 m) aft; Landing at 2,160 t: 3 ft 11 in (1.19 m) forward; 9 ft 10 in (3.00 m) aft
- Installed power: 2 × 900 hp (670 kW) Electro-Motive Diesel 12-567A diesel engines; 1,700 shp (1,300 kW)
- Propulsion: 1 × Falk main reduction gears; 2 × Propellers
- Speed: 12 kn (22 km/h; 14 mph)
- Range: 24,000 nmi (44,000 km; 28,000 mi) at 9 kn (17 km/h; 10 mph) while displacing 3,960 long tons (4,024 t)
- Boats & landing craft carried: 2 or 6 x LCVPs
- Capacity: 2,100 tons oceangoing maximum; 350 tons main deckload
- Troops: 163
- Complement: 117
- Armament: Varied, ultimate armament; 1 × QF 12-pounder 12 cwt naval gun; 6 × 20 mm (0.79 in) Oerlikon cannon; 4 × Fast Aerial Mine (FAM) mounts

HMS LST-428 was a United States Navy LST-1-class tank landing ship that was transferred to the Royal Navy during World War II. As with many of her class, the ship was never named. Instead, she was referred to by her hull designation.

== Construction ==
LST-428 was laid down on 22 November 1942, under Maritime Commission (MARCOM) contract, MC hull 948, by the Bethlehem-Fairfield Shipyard, Baltimore, Maryland; launched 22 December 1942; then transferred to the United Kingdom and commissioned on 9 February 1943.

== Service history ==
LST-428 saw no active service in the United States Navy. She was decommissioned and returned to United States Navy custody on 10 June 1946, and struck from the Naval Vessel Register on 19 July 1946. On 10 October 1947, she was sold to Luria Bros, and Co., Inc., Philadelphia, Pennsylvania, and subsequently scrapped.

== See also ==
- List of United States Navy LSTs

== Notes ==
Citations

== Bibliography ==
Online resources

- "LST-428". Dictionary of American Naval Fighting Ships. Naval History and Heritage Command. This article incorporates text from this source, which is in the public domain.
- "Bethlehem-Fairfield, Baltimore MD". www.ShipbuildingHistory.com. 14 August 2008.
- "USS LST-428". NavSource. 29 May 2015.
