= HM LST-406 =

1942 LST-1-class tank landing ship

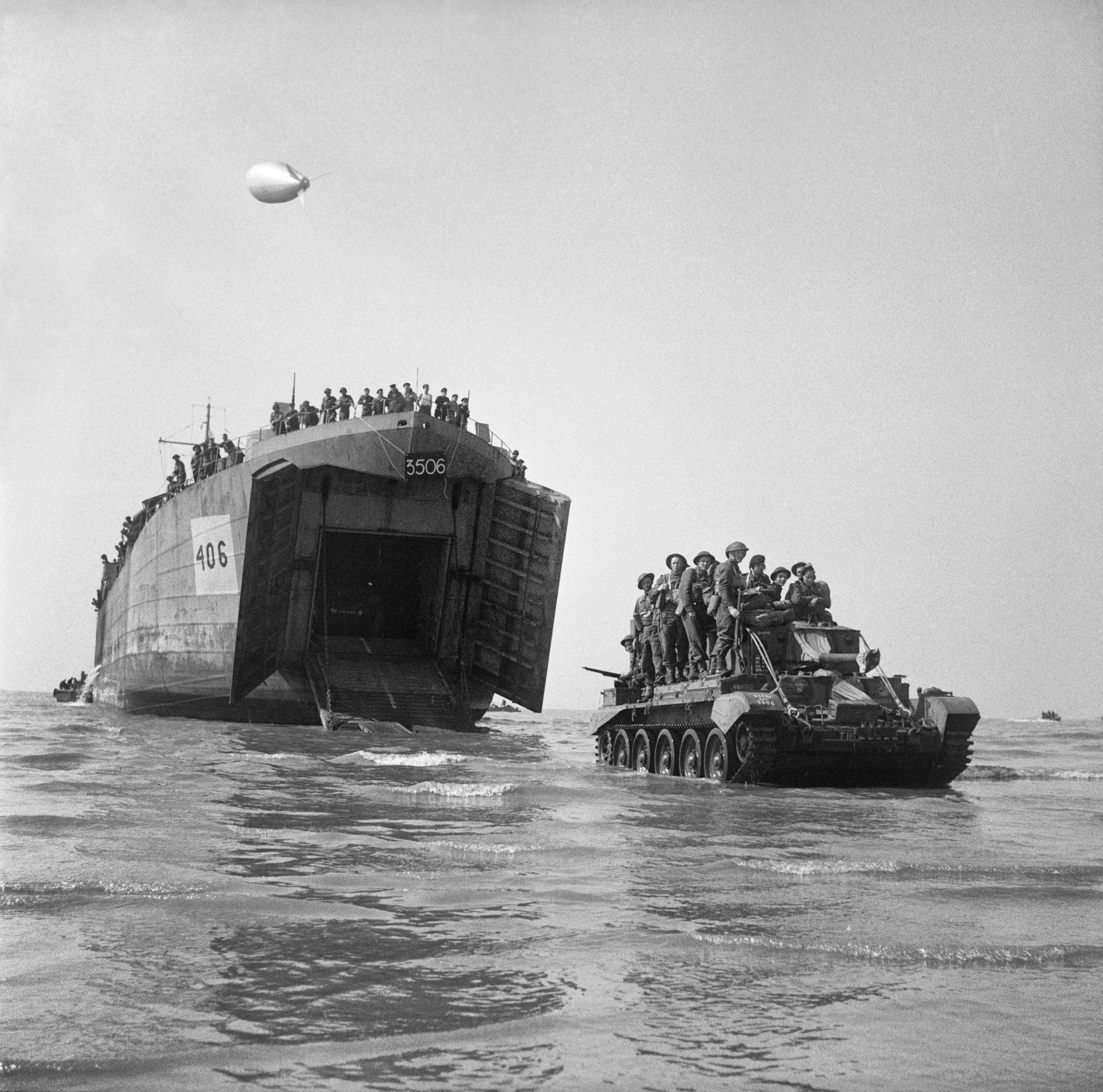
- HM LST-406 beached at Gold Beach with bow doors open and ramp down disembarking a Cromwell Mk IV tank of 22nd Armoured Brigade 7th Armoured Division ashore on 7 June 1944.

History

United Kingdom
- Name: LST-406
- Ordered: as a Type S3-M-K2 hull, MCE hull 926
- Builder: Bethlehem-Fairfield Shipyard, Baltimore, Maryland
- Yard number: 2178
- Laid down: 1 September 1942
- Launched: 28 October 1942
- Commissioned: 26 December 1942
- Decommissioned: 11 April 1946
- Identification: Hull symbol: LST-406
- Fate: Returned to USN custody, 11 April 1946

United States
- Name: LST-406
- Acquired: 11 April 1946
- Stricken: 10 June 1947
- Fate: Sold for scrapping, 5 December 1947 but reported to be in commercial service, as late as 1978

General characteristics
- Class & type: LST-1-class tank landing ship
- Displacement: 4,080 long tons (4,145 t) full load; 2,160 long tons (2,190 t) landing
- Length: 328 ft (100 m) oa
- Beam: 50 ft (15 m)
- Draft: Full load: 8 ft 2 in (2.49 m) forward; 14 ft 1 in (4.29 m) aft; Landing at 2,160 t: 3 ft 11 in (1.19 m) forward; 9 ft 10 in (3.00 m) aft
- Installed power: 2 × 900 hp (670 kW) Electro-Motive Diesel 12-567A diesel engines; 1,700 shp (1,300 kW)
- Propulsion: 1 × Falk main reduction gears; 2 × Propellers
- Speed: 12 kn (22 km/h; 14 mph)
- Range: 24,000 nmi (44,000 km; 28,000 mi) at 9 kn (17 km/h; 10 mph) while displacing 3,960 long tons (4,024 t)
- Boats & landing craft carried: 2 or 6 x LCVPs
- Capacity: 2,100 tons oceangoing maximum; 350 tons main deckload
- Troops: 163
- Complement: 117
- Armament: Varied, ultimate armament; 1 × QF 12-pounder 12 cwt naval gun; 6 × 20 mm (0.79 in) Oerlikon cannon; 4 × Fast Aerial Mine (FAM) mounts

HMS LST-406 was a United States Navy LST-1-class tank landing ship that was transferred to the Royal Navy during World War II. As with many of her class, the ship was never named. Instead, she was referred to by her hull designation.

== Construction ==
LST-406 was laid down on 1 September 1942, under Maritime Commission (MARCOM) contract, MC hull 926, by the Bethlehem-Fairfield Shipyard, Baltimore, Maryland; launched 28 October 1942; then transferred to the United Kingdom and commissioned on 26 December 1942.

== Service history ==
LST-406 left Halifax, Nova Scotia, along with sister ships LST-336 and LST-319, in convoy SC 125 for Liverpool, 31 March 1943, arriving 14 April 1944.

LST-406 saw no active service in the United States Navy. The tank landing ship was decommissioned and returned to United States Navy custody on 11 April 1946. She was struck from the Navy list on 10 June 1947. On 5 December 1947, LST-406 was sold to Bosey, Philippines, for scrapping. However, as late as 1978, she was reported to be in commercial service as Chung 116, flagged for the People's Republic of China.

== See also ==
- List of United States Navy LSTs

== Notes ==
Citations

== Bibliography ==
Online resources

- "LST-406". Dictionary of American Naval Fighting Ships. Naval History and Heritage Command. This article incorporates text from this source, which is in the public domain.
- "Bethlehem-Fairfield, Baltimore MD". www.ShipbuildingHistory.com. 14 August 2008.
- "USS LST-406". NavSource. 31 October 2014.
