= HM LST-402 =

1942 LST-1-class tank landing ship

History

United Kingdom
- Name: LST-402
- Ordered: as a Type S3-M-K2 hull, MCE hull 922
- Builder: Bethlehem-Fairfield Shipyard, Baltimore, Maryland
- Yard number: 2174
- Laid down: 21 August 1942
- Launched: 9 October 1942
- Commissioned: 9 December 1942
- Decommissioned: 24 September 1946
- Reclassified: LSE-53
- Identification: Hull symbol: LST-402; Hull symbol: LSE-53
- Fate: Returned to USN custody, 24 September 1946

United States
- Name: LSE-53
- Acquired: 24 September 1946
- Stricken: 10 June 1947
- Fate: Sold for scrap

General characteristics
- Class & type: LST-1-class tank landing ship
- Displacement: 4,080 long tons (4,145 t) full load; 2,160 long tons (2,190 t) landing
- Length: 328 ft (100 m) oa
- Beam: 50 ft (15 m)
- Draft: Full load: 8 ft 2 in (2.49 m) forward; 14 ft 1 in (4.29 m) aft; Landing at 2,160 t: 3 ft 11 in (1.19 m) forward; 9 ft 10 in (3.00 m) aft
- Installed power: 2 × 900 hp (670 kW) Electro-Motive Diesel 12-567A diesel engines; 1,700 shp (1,300 kW)
- Propulsion: 1 × Falk main reduction gears; 2 × Propellers
- Speed: 12 kn (22 km/h; 14 mph)
- Range: 24,000 nmi (44,000 km; 28,000 mi) at 9 kn (17 km/h; 10 mph) while displacing 3,960 long tons (4,024 t)
- Boats & landing craft carried: 2 or 6 x LCVPs
- Capacity: 2,100 tons oceangoing maximum; 350 tons main deckload
- Troops: 163
- Complement: 117
- Armament: Varied, ultimate armament; 1 × QF 12-pounder 12 cwt naval gun; 6 × 20 mm (0.79 in) Oerlikon cannon; 4 × Fast Aerial Mine (FAM) mounts

Service record
- Part of: 1st flotilla Mediterranean
- Operations: Invasion of Sicily; Salerno landings; Anzio landing; Normandy landings

HMS LST-402/LSE-53 was a United States Navy LST-1-class tank landing ship that was transferred to the Royal Navy during World War II. As with many of her class, the ship was never named. Instead, she was referred to by her hull designation.

== Construction ==
LST-402 was laid down on 21 August 1942, under Maritime Commission (MARCOM) contract, MC hull 922, by the Bethlehem-Fairfield Shipyard, Baltimore, Maryland; launched 9 October 1942; then transferred to the United Kingdom and commissioned on 9 December 1942.

== Service history ==
LST-402 was active in the Mediterranean during the Invasion of Sicily, the Salerno landings, and the Anzio landing. She later took part in the Normandy landings in the English Channel.

LST-402 was converted to LSE-53 for the 65th Maintenance Mobile Unit at the Wallsend-on-Tyne slipway.

In the summer of 1945, she was assigned to service in the Far East.

LST-402 saw no active service in the United States Navy. The tank landing ship was decommissioned and returned to United States Navy custody on 24 September 1946, and struck from the Navy list on 10 June 1947. She was subsequently sold for scrap, and dismantled in Gibraltar.

== See also ==
- List of United States Navy LSTs

== Notes ==
Citations

== Bibliography ==
Online resources

- "LST-402". Dictionary of American Naval Fighting Ships. Naval History and Heritage Command. This article incorporates text from this source, which is in the public domain.
- "Bethlehem-Fairfield, Baltimore MD". www.ShipbuildingHistory.com. 14 August 2008.
- "USS LST-402". NavSource. 26 August 2016.
