= HMS LST-429 =

1943 LST-1-class tank landing ship

History

United Kingdom
- Name: LST-429
- Ordered: as a Type S3-M-K2 hull, MCE hull 949
- Builder: Bethlehem Fairfield Shipyard, Baltimore, Maryland
- Yard number: 2201
- Laid down: 16 November 1942
- Launched: 11 January 1943
- Commissioned: 20 February 1943
- Stricken: 24 November 1943
- Identification: Hull symbol: LST-429
- Fate: Lost in action, 3 July 1943

General characteristics
- Class & type: LST-1-class tank landing ship
- Displacement: 1,625 long tons (1,651 t) (light); 4,080 long tons (4,145 t) (full (seagoing draft with 1,675 short tons (1,520 t) load); 2,366 long tons (2,404 t) (beaching)
- Length: 328 ft (100 m) oa
- Beam: 50 ft (15 m)
- Draft: Unloaded: 2 ft 4 in (0.71 m) forward; 7 ft 6 in (2.29 m) aft; Full load: 8 ft 2 in (2.49 m) forward; 14 ft 1 in (4.29 m) aft; Landing with 500 short tons (450 t) load: 3 ft 11 in (1.19 m) forward; 9 ft 10 in (3.00 m) aft
- Installed power: 2 × 900 hp (670 kW) Electro-Motive Diesel 12-567A diesel engines; 1,700 shp (1,300 kW)
- Propulsion: 1 × Falk main reduction gears; 2 × Propellers
- Speed: 12 kn (22 km/h; 14 mph)
- Range: 24,000 nmi (44,000 km; 28,000 mi) at 9 kn (17 km/h; 10 mph) while displacing 3,960 long tons (4,024 t)
- Boats & landing craft carried: 2 x LCVPs
- Capacity: 1,600–1,900 short tons (3,200,000–3,800,000 lb; 1,500,000–1,700,000 kg) cargo depending on mission
- Troops: 163
- Complement: 117
- Armament: Varied, ultimate armament; 1 × QF 12-pounder 12 cwt naval gun; 6 × 20 mm (0.79 in) Oerlikon cannons; 4 × Fast Aerial Mine (FAM) mounts

HMS LST-429 was a United States Navy LST-1-class tank landing ship that was transferred to the Royal Navy during World War II. As with many of her class, the ship was never named. Instead, she was referred to by her hull designation.

== Construction ==
LST-429 was laid down on 16 November 1942, under Maritime Commission (MARCOM) contract, MC hull 949, by the Bethlehem Fairfield Shipyard, Baltimore, Maryland; launched 11 January 1943; then transferred to the United Kingdom and commissioned on 20 February 1943.

== Service history ==
The ship was sunk due to a fire while in Royal Navy service in July 1943, northwest of Zuwarah, Libya. On 24 November 1943, LST-429 was struck from the Navy list.

The wreck is located at: 33°05′N 11°52′E

== See also ==
- List of United States Navy LSTs

== Bibliography ==
Online resources

- "LST-429". Dictionary of American Naval Fighting Ships. Navy Department, Naval History and Heritage Command. This article incorporates text from this source, which is in the public domain.
- "Bethlehem-Fairfield, Baltimore MD". www.ShipbuildingHistory.com. 14 August 2008.
- "USS LST-429". NavSource. 15 November 2004.
- Helgason, Guðmundur. "HMS LST-429". German U-boats of WWII - uboat.net.
