= HM LST-425 =

1942 LST-1-class tank landing ship

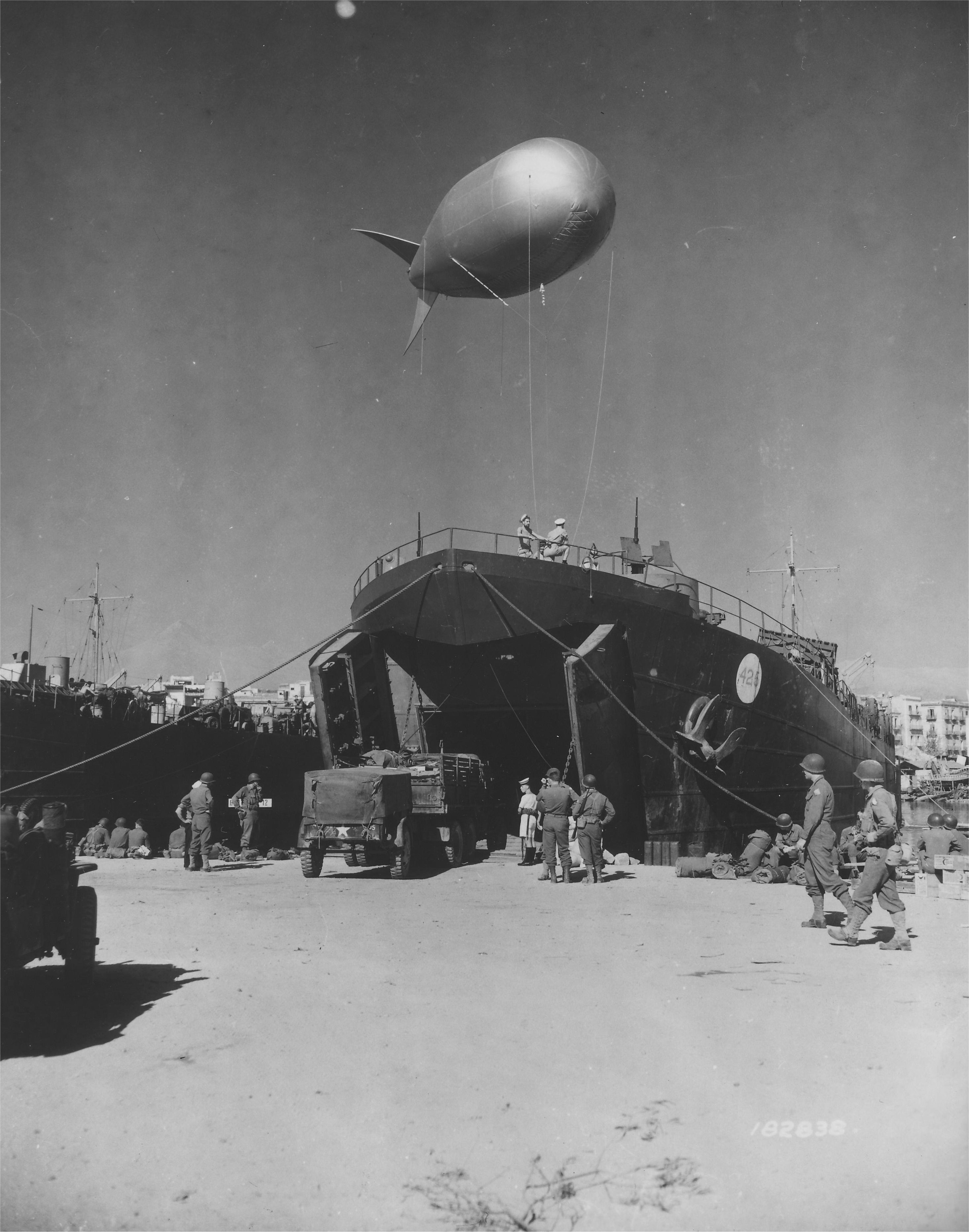
- HM LST-425 loading trucks and troops of the 45th Division, 14 September 1943, at Palermo, Sicily for the Salerno landings.

History

United Kingdom
- Name: LST-425
- Ordered: as a Type S3-M-K2 hull, MCE hull 945
- Builder: Bethlehem-Fairfield Shipyard, Baltimore, Maryland
- Yard number: 2197
- Laid down: 16 November 1942
- Launched: 12 December 1942
- Commissioned: 10 February 1943
- Decommissioned: 30 August 1946
- Identification: Hull symbol: LST-425
- Fate: Returned to USN custody, 30 August 1946

United States
- Name: LST-425
- Acquired: 30 August 1946
- Stricken: 10 June 1947
- Fate: Sold, 8 October 1947

General characteristics
- Class & type: LST-1-class tank landing ship
- Displacement: 4,080 long tons (4,145 t) full load; 2,160 long tons (2,190 t) landing
- Length: 328 ft (100 m) oa
- Beam: 50 ft (15 m)
- Draft: Full load: 8 ft 2 in (2.49 m) forward; 14 ft 1 in (4.29 m) aft; Landing at 2,160 t: 3 ft 11 in (1.19 m) forward; 9 ft 10 in (3.00 m) aft
- Installed power: 2 × 900 hp (670 kW) Electro-Motive Diesel 12-567A diesel engines; 1,700 shp (1,300 kW)
- Propulsion: 1 × Falk main reduction gears; 2 × Propellers
- Speed: 12 kn (22 km/h; 14 mph)
- Range: 24,000 nmi (44,000 km; 28,000 mi) at 9 kn (17 km/h; 10 mph) while displacing 3,960 long tons (4,024 t)
- Boats & landing craft carried: 2 or 6 x LCVPs
- Capacity: 2,100 tons oceangoing maximum; 350 tons main deckload
- Troops: 163
- Complement: 117
- Armament: Varied, ultimate armament; 1 × QF 12-pounder 12 cwt naval gun; 6 × 20 mm (0.79 in) Oerlikon cannon; 4 × Fast Aerial Mine (FAM) mounts

HMS LST-425 was a United States Navy LST-1-class tank landing ship that was transferred to the Royal Navy during World War II. As with many of her class, the ship was never named. Instead, she was referred to by her hull designation.

== Construction ==
LST-425 was laid down on 16 November 1942, under Maritime Commission (MARCOM) contract, MC hull 945, by the Bethlehem-Fairfield Shipyard, Baltimore, Maryland; launched 12 December 1942; then transferred to the United Kingdom and commissioned on 10 February 1943.

== Service history ==
LST-425 saw no active service in the United States Navy. She was decommissioned and returned to United States Navy custody on 30 August 1946, and struck from the Naval Vessel Register on 10 June 1947. She was sold on 8 October 1947.

== See also ==
- List of United States Navy LSTs

== Notes ==
Citations

== Bibliography ==
Online resources

- "LST-425". Dictionary of American Naval Fighting Ships. Naval History and Heritage Command. 30 July 2015. This article incorporates text from this source, which is in the public domain.
- "Bethlehem-Fairfield, Baltimore MD". www.ShipbuildingHistory.com. 14 August 2008.
- "USS LST-425". NavSource. 18 April 2014.
