= Sword Line Inc. =

Former US Shipping Company

- Industry: Transportation and shipping
- Founded: 1933 in New York City
- Key people: Charilaos "Charles" G. Poulacos; Abbott Abercrombie

Sword Line Inc. was a steamship company founded by Charilaos "Charles" G. Poulacos and Abbott Abercrombie in New York City in 1933. Sword Line Inc. had shipping routes from Atlantic ports to and Gulf of Mexico ports. Charilaos "Charles" G. Poulacos and Abbott Abercrombie purchased the ship Eastern Sword in 1932. The Eastern Sword was a 3,785-ton cargo ship built in 1920 at the Uraga Dry Dock Co. Ltd, at Uraga, Japan. The ship sank after being hit by a torpedo from German submarine U-162 on May 4, 1942 twelve miles (19 km) off the coast of Georgetown, Guyana. The Eastern Sword had a crew of 38 and only 13 survived the attack. Sword Line Inc. was active in supporting the World War II effort.

== History ==
At the time Sword Line, Inc. was purchased, in 1932, Captain Charles G. Poulacos and Abbott Abercrombie were working as assistant director at steamship company. Poulacos was president of Sword Line, Inc. Poulacos and Abercrombie purchased the Eastern Sword from the United States Shipping Board for $54,000. Sword Line, Inc. headquarters was at 76 Beaver St., New York, New York. Poulacos was born in Greece in 1884 and came to America in 1915. Sword Line, Inc. was successful and purchased three more ships. In 1939 Poulacos purchased share of Abercrombie Sword Line, Inc. Poulacos then worked for an electrical distributing company. Eastern Sword had one sister ship, the Ugo Maru, it was not purchased by the United States Shipping Board. The Ugo Maru became an Auxiliary Transport ship in the Empire of Japan. On October 20, 1944, the Ugo Maru was also sunk. Ugo Maru was hit by a torpedo from an American submarine USS Hammerhead (SS-364) off Miri, Borneo.

== World War II ==
Sword Line, Inc. ships were used to help the World War II effort. During World War II Sword Line, Inc. operated Merchant navy ships for the United States Shipping Board. During World War II Sword Line, Inc. was active with charter shipping with the Maritime Commission and War Shipping Administration. Sword Line, Inc. operated Liberty ships and Victory ships for the merchant navy. The ship was run by its Sword Line, Inc. crew and the US Navy supplied United States Navy Armed Guards to man the deck guns and radio.

== Ships ==
- Sword Line Inc ships owned:
- Eastern Sword built in 1920 at the Uraga Dry Dock Co. Ltd, at Uraga, Kanagawa, Japan. The ship sank after being hit by a torpedo from German submarine U-162 on May 4, 1942.
- Alabama Sword built in 1944 was seized by Allies at Flensburg in 1945, became Empire Lune sold to Sword Line in 1947, in 1951 renamed Texas Sword, sold in 1956.
- Florida Sword built in 1943 as Halsnaes, taken over by Germany renamed Kronenfels for Hansa Line, in 1945 seized by Allies at Copenhagen. Became Empire Roden, sold to Sword Line Inc in 1947. Sold in 1956.
- Silver Sword, built in 1919 by Downey Shipbuilding Company. Sank after a torpedo attack by German submarine U-255 while in Convoy QP 14 coming home to New York City from Arkhangelsk, Russia, one crew member was killed.
- Western Sword, built in 1944, ship # V-2651, ID 219567, operated during World War 2
- Yankee Sword, built in 1921 at New York Shipbuilding Corporation, operated during World War 2. On March 22, 1945, pick up the survivors of the SS Corinth a Keystone Shipping Company Oil Tanker, sunk by Japanese Submarine on March 18.
- Victory Sword, a tanker built in 1910 by Fore River Shipbuilding, operated during World War 2, was deliberately sunk on June 18, 1944, due to its poor condition, to make a breakwater for Normandy landings making Mulberry harbour at Utah Beach.
- MV Oregon Sword, a Type C1 ship, C1-MT-BU1 Cargo, built as Oregon Fir at Albina Engine & Machine Works in Portland OR in 1946. Operated during post World War 2 work and Korean War. Wrecked and a total loss in 1967.
- MV Arizona Sword, Type C1 ship, C1-MT-BU1 Cargo, built at Albina E. & M. in 1945. Sank after collision with Berwindvale on May 4, 1951, in a Cape Cod Canal, she was raised and converted to a barge in 1954. The barge foundered on January 13, 1961.
- MV California Sword, Type C1 ship, C1-MT-BU1 Cargo, built at Albina E. & M. in 1946 as California Redwood, ship Number V-5349, Official Number 248911.
- Coalinga Hills, a T2 tanker, acquired in 1948, sold in 1962, built in 1943 by Marinship, Sausalito, California

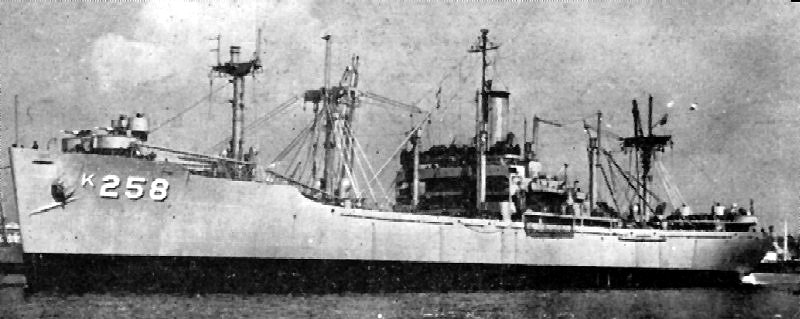
A Victory ship of World War II

Liberty ship of World War II

  - World War II operated ships:
  - Liberty Ships:
- SS Pedro Menendez
- SS Cardinal Gibbons built in 1942 at Bethlehem-Fairfield Shipyard.
- Milton J. Foreman, built in 1944
- George A. Lawson, sank in 1964 as SS Union Atlantic
- Cecil G. Sellers, built in 1944, post war work in 1946, burnt and scrapped 1948
- Daniel Hiester, built in 1942, post war work in 1946.
- Benjamin H. Bristow, built in 1942, post war work in 1946.
- SS Abner Doubleday, built in 1942 at the Oregon SB Corp.
- Renald Fernald, built in 1943, post war work in 1946, wrecked and scrapped 1963
  - Victory ship:
- SS Carroll Victory, operated post war work in 1948, in 1949 transferred to US Coast Guard.

  - Other
- SS Golden Eagle, Type R ship R2-S-BV1, refrigerated cargo ship.
- MV Arizona Pine, post war work in 1946 to 1948, a Type C1 ship, C1-MT-BU1 Cargo, became MV Arizona Sword in 1948.

== See also ==
- World War II United States Merchant Navy
