= SS Cardinal Gibbons =

Liberty ship of WWII

History

United States
- Name: Cardinal Gibbons
- Namesake: Cardinal Gibbons
- Owner: War Shipping Administration (WSA)
- Operator: Sword Line Inc. 1942; Marine Transport Lines 1943
- Ordered: as type (EC2-S-C1) hull, MCE hull 920
- Awarded: 1 January 1942
- Builder: Bethlehem-Fairfield Shipyard, Baltimore, Maryland
- Cost: $1,057,253
- Yard number: 2070
- Way number: 15
- Laid down: 8 September 1942
- Launched: 10 October 1942
- Sponsored by: Mrs. N.J. Nelligan
- Completed: 23 October 1942
- Identification: Call sign: KHMH
- Fate: Laid up in James River Reserve Fleet, Jones Point, New York, 29 October 1948; Laid up in National Defense Reserve Fleet, Beaumont, Texas, 13 October 1949; Laid up in National Defense Reserve Fleet, Mobile, Alabama, 14 October 1957; Sold for scrapping, 2 November 1970, removed from fleet, 23 November 1970

General characteristics
- Class & type: Liberty ship; type EC2-S-C1, standard
- Tonnage: 10,865 LT DWT; 7,176 GRT
- Displacement: 3,380 long tons (3,434 t) (light); 14,245 long tons (14,474 t) (max)
- Length: 441 feet 6 inches (135 m) oa; 416 feet (127 m) pp; 427 feet (130 m) lwl
- Beam: 57 feet (17 m)
- Draft: 27 ft 9.25 in (8.4646 m)
- Installed power: 2 × Oil fired 450 °F (232 °C) boilers, operating at 220 psi (1,500 kPa); 2,500 hp (1,900 kW)
- Propulsion: 1 × triple-expansion steam engine, (manufactured by Ellicott Machine Corp., Baltimore, Maryland); 1 × screw propeller
- Speed: 11.5 knots (21.3 km/h; 13.2 mph)
- Capacity: 562,608 cubic feet (15,931 m^{3}) (grain); 499,573 cubic feet (14,146 m^{3}) (bale)
- Complement: 38–62 USMM; 21–40 USNAG
- Armament: Varied by ship; Bow-mounted 3-inch (76 mm)/50-caliber gun; Stern-mounted 4-inch (102 mm)/50-caliber gun; 2–8 × single 20-millimeter (0.79 in) Oerlikon anti-aircraft (AA) cannons and/or, 2–8 × 37-millimeter (1.46 in) M1 AA guns

SS Cardinal Gibbons was a Liberty ship built in the United States during World War II. She was named after Cardinal Gibbons, an American prelate of the Catholic Church. He served as Apostolic Vicar of North Carolina from 1868 to 1872, Bishop of Richmond from 1872 to 1877, and as ninth Archbishop of Baltimore from 1877 until his death in 1921. Gibbons was elevated to the rank of cardinal in 1886.

== Construction ==
Cardinal Gibbons was laid down on 8 September 1942, under a Maritime Commission (MARCOM) contract, MCE hull 920, by the Bethlehem-Fairfield Shipyard, Baltimore, Maryland; she was sponsored by Mrs. N.J. Nelligan, the sister-in-law of Monsignor Nelligan of the Baltimore Cathedral, and was launched on 10 October 1942.

== History ==
She was allocated to Sword Line Inc. on 23 October 1942 and then Marine Transport Lines on June 28, 1943. On 29 October 1948, she was laid up in the James River Reserve Fleet, Jones Point, New York. On 13 October 1949, she was laid up in National Defense Reserve Fleet, Beaumont, Texas. On 14 October 1957, she was laid up in National Defense Reserve Fleet, Mobile, Alabama. On 2 November 1970, she was sold for scrapping to Union Minerals & Alloys Corp., for $41,137. She was removed from the fleet on 23 November 1970.

== Bibliography ==
- "Bethlehem-Fairfield, Baltimore MD". www.ShipbuildingHistory.com. 14 August 2008.
- Maritime Administration. "Cardinal Gibbons". Ship History Database Vessel Status Card. U.S. Department of Transportation, Maritime Administration.
- Davies, James (May 2004). "Specifications (As-Built)" (PDF). p. 23.
- "SS Cardinal Gibbons".
