= Thomas Jefferson Hubbard =

American politician, Oregon pioneer (1806–1877)

Thomas J. Hubbard
- Born: 1806; Kinderhook, New York
- Died: April 24, 1877 (aged 70–71); Oregon
- Occupation: Gunsmith
- Spouse: Mary St. Martin

Thomas Jefferson Hubbard (1806 – April 24, 1877) was an Oregon pioneer and politician who was acquitted of murder charges in the first American murder trial in what is now the state of Oregon. At the trial the murder was determined to be justifiable homicide.

== Early life ==
Thomas Hubbard was born in Kinderhook, New York, in 1806. By 1834 he had left New York and joined Nathaniel Jarvis Wyeth's expedition to Oregon Country where Wyeth attempted to set up a fur trading network.

== Oregon Country ==
In September 1834, the Wyeth party reached Fort Vancouver, the Hudson's Bay Company premier station in the Columbia Department. On Wapato Island, the Americans constructed Fort William, where Hubbard served as the gunsmith. The next year Hubbard was accused of murdering the fort's tailor, Thornburgh. Thornburgh had entered Hubbard's residence in the night with a rifle with the intention of murder, although Hubbard had been made aware of this. Hubbard had two loaded pistols ready and shot Thornburgh in the chest, killing him. In the subsequent trial overseen by Wyeth's friend, naturalist John Kirk Townsend, Hubbard was found not guilty as the death was ruled justifiable homicide. The fight that lead to the death had been over a Native American woman named Mary St. Martin, whom Hubbard married on April 3, 1837, with the Reverend Jason Lee presiding.

In 1841, Hubbard participated in a cattle venture where he and others built a ship and sailed it to California where they sold it and purchased cattle to drive back to Oregon. In 1843, Hubbard participated in the Champoeg Meetings, where he served on several committees and voted for the creation of the Provisional Government of Oregon. Hubbard sailed for the Kingdom of Hawaii in 1845 on the brig Chenamus. A fellow traveler aboard, Gustavus Hines, complained that Hubbard and other passengers were neither "wise nor virtuous" for spending their time playing backgammon and card games.

When the Cayuse War began in 1847 after the Whitman massacre, Hubbard built and donated a rifle and pistol to the government. Later he moved to Yamhill County where he built a sawmill. He died on April 24, 1877.
