= HM LST-409 =

1942 LST-1-class tank landing ship

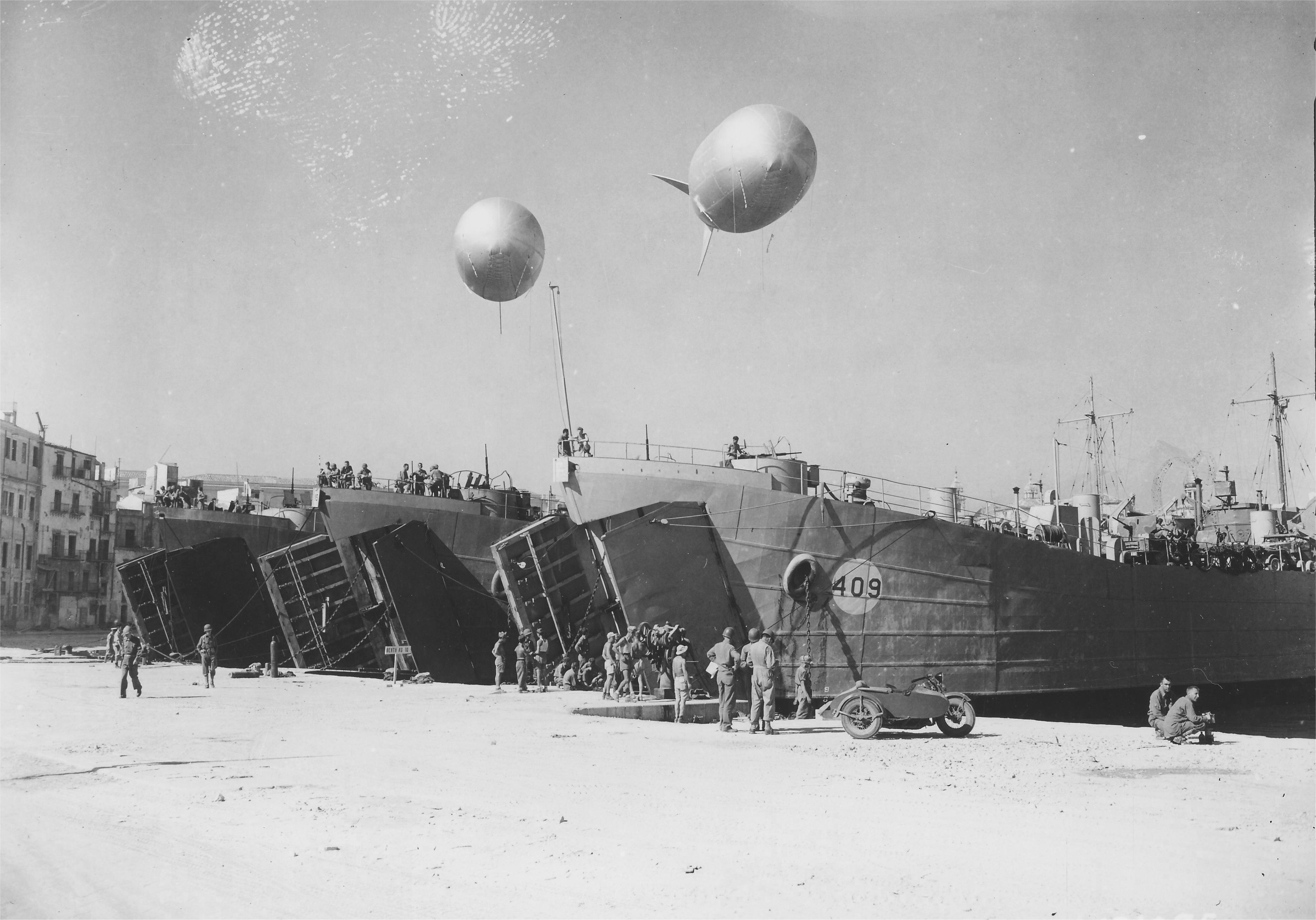
- HM LST-409, with two unidentified LSTs, moored at Palermo, Sicily, Italy, 4 September 1943, probably preparing to load troops and equipment for the Salerno landings, scheduled for 9 September 1943.

History

United Kingdom
- Name: LST-409
- Ordered: as a Type S3-M-K2 hull, MCE hull 929
- Builder: Bethlehem-Fairfield Shipyard, Baltimore, Maryland
- Yard number: 2181
- Laid down: 9 September 1942
- Launched: 15 November 1942
- Commissioned: 6 January 1943
- Decommissioned: 2 July 1946
- Identification: Hull symbol: LST-409
- Fate: Returned to US Navy, 2 July 1946

United States
- Name: LST-409
- Acquired: 2 July 1946
- Stricken: 29 October 1946
- Fate: Sold, 21 November 1946

General characteristics
- Class & type: LST-1-class tank landing ship
- Displacement: 1,625 long tons (1,651 t) (light); 4,080 long tons (4,145 t) (full (seagoing draft with 1,675 short tons (1,520 t) load); 2,366 long tons (2,404 t) (beaching)
- Length: 328 ft (100 m) oa
- Beam: 50 ft (15 m)
- Draft: Unloaded: 2 ft 4 in (0.71 m) forward; 7 ft 6 in (2.29 m) aft; Full load: 8 ft 2 in (2.49 m) forward; 14 ft 1 in (4.29 m) aft; Landing with 500 short tons (450 t) load: 3 ft 11 in (1.19 m) forward; 9 ft 10 in (3.00 m) aft
- Installed power: 2 × 900 hp (670 kW) Electro-Motive Diesel 12-567A diesel engines; 1,700 shp (1,300 kW)
- Propulsion: 1 × Falk main reduction gears; 2 × Propellers
- Speed: 12 kn (22 km/h; 14 mph)
- Range: 24,000 nmi (44,000 km; 28,000 mi) at 9 kn (17 km/h; 10 mph) while displacing 3,960 long tons (4,024 t)
- Boats & landing craft carried: 2 x LCVPs
- Capacity: 1,600–1,900 short tons (3,200,000–3,800,000 lb; 1,500,000–1,700,000 kg) cargo depending on mission
- Troops: 163
- Complement: 117
- Armament: Varied, ultimate armament; 1 × QF 12-pounder 12 cwt naval gun; 6 × 20 mm (0.79 in) Oerlikon cannon; 4 × Fast Aerial Mine (FAM) mounts

HMS LST-409 was a Landing Ship, Tank Mk.2 of the Royal Navy during World War II.

Built by the US as a LST-1-class tank landing ship and transferred from the US Navy. The ship was never named, but referred to by her hull designation.

== Construction ==
LST-409 was laid down on 9 September 1942, under United States Maritime Commission (MARCOM) contract, MC hull 929, by the Bethlehem-Fairfield Shipyard, Baltimore, Maryland; launched 15 November 1942; then transferred to the United Kingdom and commissioned on 6 January 1943.

== Service history ==
LST-409 saw no active service in the United States Navy. The tank landing ship was decommissioned and returned to United States Navy custody on 2 July 1946, and struck from the Navy list on 29 October, that same year. Sometime between 21 November 1946 and 6 January 1947, LST-409 was sold to Greece.

== See also ==
- List of United States Navy LSTs

== Notes ==
Citations

== Bibliography ==
Online resources

- "LST-409". Dictionary of American Naval Fighting Ships. Naval History and Heritage Command. This article incorporates text from this source, which is in the public domain.
- "Bethlehem-Fairfield, Baltimore MD". ShipbuildingHistory.com. 14 August 2008.
- "USS LST-409". NavSource. 21 February 2014.
