= HM LST-417 =

1942 LST-1-class tank landing ship

History

United Kingdom
- Name: LST-417
- Ordered: as a Type S3-M-K2 hull, MCE hull 937
- Builder: Bethlehem-Fairfield Shipyard, Baltimore, Maryland
- Yard number: 2189
- Laid down: 29 October 1942
- Launched: 24 November 1942
- Commissioned: 29 January 1943
- Decommissioned: 31 May 1946
- Identification: Hull symbol: LST-417
- Fate: Returned to USN custody, 31 May 1946

United States
- Name: LST-417
- Acquired: 31 May 1946
- Stricken: 3 July 1946
- Fate: Sold for scrapping, 4 December 1947

General characteristics
- Class & type: LST-1-class tank landing ship
- Displacement: 4,080 long tons (4,145 t) full load; 2,160 long tons (2,190 t) landing
- Length: 328 ft (100 m) oa
- Beam: 50 ft (15 m)
- Draft: Full load: 8 ft 2 in (2.49 m) forward; 14 ft 1 in (4.29 m) aft; Landing at 2,160 t: 3 ft 11 in (1.19 m) forward; 9 ft 10 in (3.00 m) aft
- Installed power: 2 × 900 hp (670 kW) Electro-Motive Diesel 12-567A diesel engines; 1,700 shp (1,300 kW)
- Propulsion: 1 × Falk main reduction gears; 2 × Propellers
- Speed: 12 kn (22 km/h; 14 mph)
- Range: 24,000 nmi (44,000 km; 28,000 mi) at 9 kn (17 km/h; 10 mph) while displacing 3,960 long tons (4,024 t)
- Boats & landing craft carried: 2 or 6 x LCVPs
- Capacity: 2,100 tons oceangoing maximum; 350 tons main deckload
- Troops: 163
- Complement: 117
- Armament: Varied, ultimate armament; 1 × QF 12-pounder 12 cwt naval gun; 6 × 20 mm (0.79 in) Oerlikon cannon; 4 × Fast Aerial Mine (FAM) mounts

HMS LST-417 was a United States Navy LST-1-class tank landing ship that was transferred to the Royal Navy during World War II. As with many of her class, the ship was never named. Instead, she was referred to by her hull designation.

== Construction ==
LST-417 was laid down on 29 October 1942, under Maritime Commission (MARCOM) contract, MC hull 937, by the Bethlehem-Fairfield Shipyard, Baltimore, Maryland; launched 24 November 1942; then transferred to the United Kingdom and commissioned on 29 January 1943.

== Service history ==
LST-417 saw no active service in the United States Navy. She was decommissioned and returned to United States Navy custody on 31 May 1946, and struck from the Naval Vessel Register on 3 July 1946. On 4 December 1947, LST-417 was sold to James A. Hughes, New York City, and subsequently scrapped.

== See also ==
- List of United States Navy LSTs

== Notes ==
Citations

== Bibliography ==
Online resources

- "LST-417". Dictionary of American Naval Fighting Ships. Naval History and Heritage Command. This article incorporates text from this source, which is in the public domain.
- "Bethlehem-Fairfield, Baltimore MD". www.ShipbuildingHistory.com. 14 August 2008.
- "USS LST-417". NavSource. 16 May 2014.
