= Liberty Fleet Day =

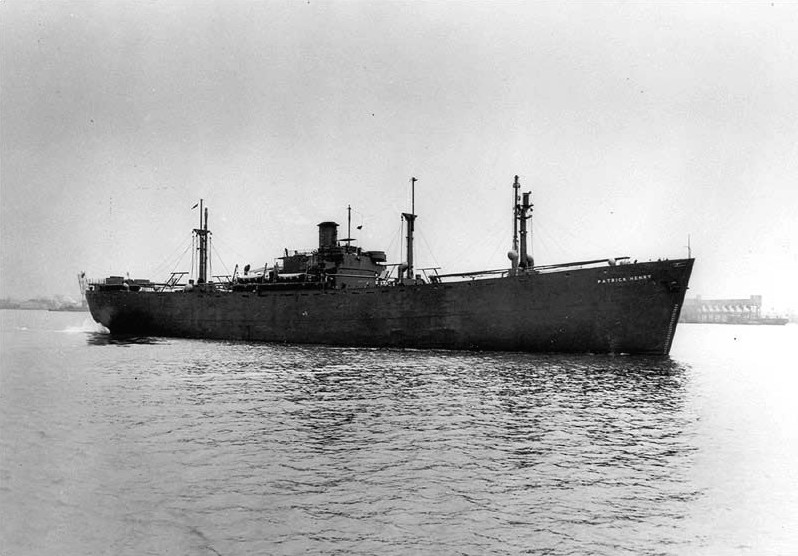
SS Patrick Henry shortly after launching

Liberty Fleet Day was first observed on 27 September 1941, the day that 14 merchant ships were launched in shipyards across the United States under the Emergency Shipbuilding program. Among the ships launched was the first Liberty ship, SS Patrick Henry. Some of the merchant ships were subsequently converted to other purposes, including as troop transports and a Royal Navy aircraft carrier. In addition to the merchant ships launched, the US Navy launched two destroyers at the Boston Navy Yard.

President Franklin D. Roosevelt launched the first liberty ship, SS Patrick Henry, at the yards of Bethlehem Steel, Baltimore, Maryland, giving a speech as he did so. 27 September became known as Victory Fleet Day during the United States' participation in World War II.

== The ships ==
- SS Adabelle Lykes (Pusey and Jones – Wilmington, Delaware)
- SS African Planet (Ingalls Shipbuilding – Pascagoula, Mississippi)
- SS Alcoa Polaris (Consolidated Steel – Los Angeles, California)
- SS James McKay (Bethlehem Sparrows Point – Baltimore, Maryland)
- SS John C. Fremont (California Shipbuilding Corporation – Los Angeles, California)
- SS Fredrick Funston (Seattle-Tacoma Shipbuilding Corporation – Tacoma, Washington)
- SS Louise Lykes (Federal Shipbuilding and Drydock Company – Kearny, New Jersey)
- SS Ocean Venture (Todd-California Shipbuilding – Richmond, California)
- SS Ocean Voice (Todd-California Shipbuilding – Richmond, California)
- SS Patrick Henry (Bethlehem Steel Fairfield – Baltimore, Maryland)
- SS Star of Oregon (Oregon Shipbuilding Corporation – Portland, Oregon)
- SS Sinclair Superflame (Bethlehem Fore River Shipyard – Quincy, Massachusetts)
- SS Steel Artisan (later known as USS Barnes (CVE-7) and HMS Attacker (D02)) (Western Pipe and Steel Company – San Francisco, California)
- SS Surprise (Sun Shipbuilding & Drydock Co. - Chester, Pennsylvania)

=== Warships ===
- USS Cowie (DD-632) (Boston Navy Yard - Boston, Massachusetts)
- USS Knight (DD-633) (Boston Navy Yard - Boston, Massachusetts)

== Presidential speech ==
President Franklin D. Roosevelt delivered a speech at the first "Emergency" launch in Baltimore that morning. At the remaining 13 launches a recording of the President's speech was played. The White House released the following transcript of President Roosevelt's speech:

My fellow Americans:

This is a memorable day in the history of American shipbuilding - a memorable day in the emergency defense of the nation. Today, from dawn to dark, fourteen ships are being launched - on the Atlantic, on the Pacific and on the Gulf and among them is the first Liberty ship, the Patrick Henry.

While we are proud of what we are doing, this is certainly no time to be content. We must build more cargo ships and still more cargo ships - and we must speed the program until we achieve a launching each day, then two ships a day, fulfilling the building program undertaken by the Maritime Commission.

Our shipbuilding program - not only that of the Maritime Commission, but of the Navy - is one of our answers to the aggressors who would strike at our liberty.

I am speaking today not only to the shipworkers in the building yards on our Coasts, on our Great Lakes and on our Rivers - not only to the thousands who are present at today's launchings - but also to the men and women throughout the country who live far from salt water or shipbuilding.

I emphasize to all of you the simple, historic fact that throughout the period of our American life, going way back into Colonial days, commerce on the high seas and freedom of the seas has been a major reason for our prosperity and the building up of our country.

To give you one simple example: It is a matter of history that a large part of the capital which in the middle of the past century went into the building of railways and spread like a network into the new undeveloped areas across the Mississippi River, across the Plains and up into the Northwest, was money which had been made by American traders whose ships had sailed the seas to the Baltic, to the Mediterranean, to Africa and South America, and to Singapore and China itself.

Through all the years after the American Revolution your Government reiterated and maintained the right of American ships to voyage hither and yon without hindrance from those who sought to keep them off the seas or drive them off the seas. As a nation we have realized that our export trade and our import trade had a definitely good effect on the life of families, not only on our Coasts but on the farms and in the cities a hundred or a thousand miles from salt water.

Since 1936, when the Congress enacted the present Merchant Marine Law, we have been rehabilitating a Merchant Marine which had fallen to a low level. Today we are continuing that program at accelerated speed.

The shipworkers of America are doing a great job. They have made a commendable record for efficiency and speed. With every new ship, they are striking a telling blow at the menace to our nation and the liberty of the free peoples of the world. They struck fourteen such blows today. They have caught the true spirit with which all this nation must be imbued if Hitler and other aggressors of his ilk are to be prevented from crushing us.

We Americans as a whole cannot listen to those few Americans who preach the gospel of fear - who say in effect that they are still in favor of freedom of the seas but who would have the United States tie up our vessels in our ports. That attitude is neither truthful nor honest.

We propose that these ships sail the seas as they are intended to. We propose, to the best of our ability, to protect them from torpedo, from shell or from bomb.

The Patrick Henry, as one of the Liberty ships launched today renews that great patriot's stirring demand: "Give me liberty or give me death."

There shall be no death for America, for democracy, for freedom! There must be liberty, world-wide and eternal. That is our prayer—our pledge to all mankind.

== See also ==
- Fleet Week
- List of ship launches in 1918 for a similar event on 4 July 1918
