= HM LST-401 =

1942 LST-1-class tank landing ship

History

United Kingdom
- Name: LST-401
- Ordered: as a Type S3-M-K2 hull, MCE hull 921
- Builder: Bethlehem-Fairfield Shipyard, Baltimore, Maryland
- Yard number: 2173
- Laid down: 17 August 1942
- Launched: 16 October 1942
- Commissioned: 30 November 1942
- Decommissioned: 7 March 1946
- Fate: Returned to USN custody, 7 March 1946

United States
- Name: LST-401
- Acquired: 7 March 1946
- Stricken: 5 June 1946
- Fate: Sold, 11 October 1947

General characteristics
- Class & type: LST-1-class tank landing ship
- Displacement: 4,080 long tons (4,145 t) full load; 2,160 long tons (2,190 t) landing
- Length: 328 ft (100 m) oa
- Beam: 50 ft (15 m)
- Draft: Full load: 8 ft 2 in (2.49 m) forward; 14 ft 1 in (4.29 m) aft; Landing at 2,160 t: 3 ft 11 in (1.19 m) forward; 9 ft 10 in (3.00 m) aft
- Installed power: 2 × 900 hp (670 kW) Electro-Motive Diesel 12-567A diesel engines; 1,700 shp (1,300 kW)
- Propulsion: 1 × Falk main reduction gears; 2 × Propellers
- Speed: 12 kn (22 km/h; 14 mph)
- Range: 24,000 nmi (44,000 km; 28,000 mi) at 9 kn (17 km/h; 10 mph) while displacing 3,960 long tons (4,024 t)
- Boats & landing craft carried: 2 or 6 x LCVPs
- Capacity: 2,100 tons oceangoing maximum; 350 tons main deckload
- Troops: 163
- Complement: 117
- Armament: Varied, ultimate armament; 1 × QF 12-pounder 12 cwt naval gun; 6 × 20 mm (0.79 in) Oerlikon cannon; 4 × Fast Aerial Mine (FAM) mounts

HMS LST-401 was a United States Navy LST-1-class tank landing ship that was transferred to the Royal Navy during World War II. As with many of her class, the ship was never named. Instead, she was referred to by her hull designation.

== Construction ==
LST-401 was laid down on 17 August 1942, under Maritime Commission (MARCOM) contract, MC hull 921, by the Bethlehem-Fairfield Shipyard, Baltimore, Maryland; launched 16 October 1942; then transferred to the United Kingdom and commissioned on 30 November 1942.

== Service history ==
LST-401 saw no active service in the United States Navy. She served in the Royal Navy through the end of World War II and was returned to the custody of the United States Navy on 7 March 1946. On 5 June 1946, less than three months after her return, she was struck from the Navy list; and, on 11 October 1947, she was sold to Luria Brothers & Co., of Philadelphia, Pennsylvania.

== See also ==
- List of United States Navy LSTs

== Notes ==
Citations

== Bibliography ==
Online resources

- "LST-401". Dictionary of American Naval Fighting Ships. Naval History and Heritage Command. This article incorporates text from this source, which is in the public domain.
- "Bethlehem-Fairfield, Baltimore MD". www.ShipbuildingHistory.com. 14 August 2008.
- "USS LST-401". NavSource. 16 May 2014.
