= SS Golden Eagle =

SS Golden Eagle may refer to:

- SS Golden Eagle (1919), a name from 1928 of the former SS West Conob, a Design 1013 ship built for the United States Shipping Board; renamed Mauna Loa in 1934; sunk by Japanese aircraft on 19 February 1942 in the bombing of Darwin
- SS Golden Eagle (1942), a Type C2-S-B1-R ship built for the United States Maritime Commission in 1942; served as USAT Golden Eagle for the United States Army (1948–50) and USNS Golden Eagle (T-AF-52) for the Military Sea Transportation Service of the United States Navy (1950–1961); renamed and commissioned as USS Arcturus (AF-52) (1961–72); sunk as a target in July 1997
