= SS Pedro Menendez =

World War II Liberty ship of the United States

History

United States
- Name: Pedro Menendez
- Namesake: Pedro Menendez
- Owner: War Shipping Administration (WSA)
- Operator: Moore-McCormack Lines, Inc.
- Ordered: as type (EC2-S-C1) hull, MC hull 2313
- Builder: J.A. Jones Construction, Panama City, Florida
- Cost: $1,073,857
- Yard number: 54
- Way number: 3
- Laid down: 24 June 1944
- Launched: 31 July 1944
- Completed: 18 August 1944
- Identification: Call sign: WSSM
- Fate: Laid up in the National Defense Reserve Fleet, in Mobile, Mobile, 14 October 1946; Transferred to the Beaumont Reserve Fleet, in Beaumont, Texas, 7 July 1948; Sold for scrapping, 22 August 1966, withdrawn from fleet, 25 October 1966

General characteristics
- Class & type: Liberty ship; type EC2-S-C1, standard
- Tonnage: 10,865 LT DWT; 7,176 GRT
- Displacement: 3,380 long tons (3,434 t) (light); 14,245 long tons (14,474 t) (max)
- Length: 441 feet 6 inches (135 m) oa; 416 feet (127 m) pp; 427 feet (130 m) lwl
- Beam: 57 feet (17 m)
- Draft: 27 ft 9.25 in (8.4646 m)
- Installed power: 2 × Oil fired 450 °F (232 °C) boilers, operating at 220 psi (1,500 kPa); 2,500 hp (1,900 kW)
- Propulsion: 1 × triple-expansion steam engine, (manufactured by General Machinery Corp., Hamilton, Ohio); 1 × screw propeller
- Speed: 11.5 knots (21.3 km/h; 13.2 mph)
- Capacity: 562,608 cubic feet (15,931 m^{3}) (grain); 499,573 cubic feet (14,146 m^{3}) (bale)
- Complement: 38–62 USMM; 21–40 USNAG
- Armament: Varied by ship; Bow-mounted 3-inch (76 mm)/50-caliber gun; Stern-mounted 4-inch (102 mm)/50-caliber gun; 2–8 × single 20-millimeter (0.79 in) Oerlikon anti-aircraft (AA) cannons and/or, 2–8 × 37-millimeter (1.46 in) M1 AA guns

SS Pedro Menendez was a Liberty ship built in the United States during World War II. She was named after Pedro Menendez.

== Construction ==
Pedro Menendez was laid down on 24 June 1944, under a Maritime Commission (MARCOM) contract, MC hull 2313, by J.A. Jones Construction, Panama City, Florida; and launched on 31 July 1944.

== History ==
She was allocated to Moore-McCormack Lines, Inc., 18 August 1944. On 14 October 1946, she was laid up in the National Defense Reserve Fleet, in Mobile, Mobile.

On 23 February 1947, she was withdrawn from the fleet and allocated to Waterman Steamship Corporation. On 28 March 1947, she was allocated to Sword Line Inc. On 7 July 1948, she was allocated to the South Atlantic Steamship Line, for transfer to the Beaumont Reserve Fleet, in Beaumont, Texas. She was sold, 22 August 1966, for $45,600 to Southern Scrap Material Co., LTD, to be scrapped. She was withdrawn from the fleet on 25 October 1966.

== Bibliography ==
- "Jones Construction, Panama City FL". www.ShipbuildingHistory.com. 13 October 2010.
- Maritime Administration. "Pedro Menendez". Ship History Database Vessel Status Card. U.S. Department of Transportation, Maritime Administration. This article incorporates text from this source, which is in the public domain.
- Davies, James (May 2004). "Specifications (As-Built)" (PDF). p. 23.
- "SS Pedro Menendez".
