= SS Abner Doubleday =

WWII Liberty Ship

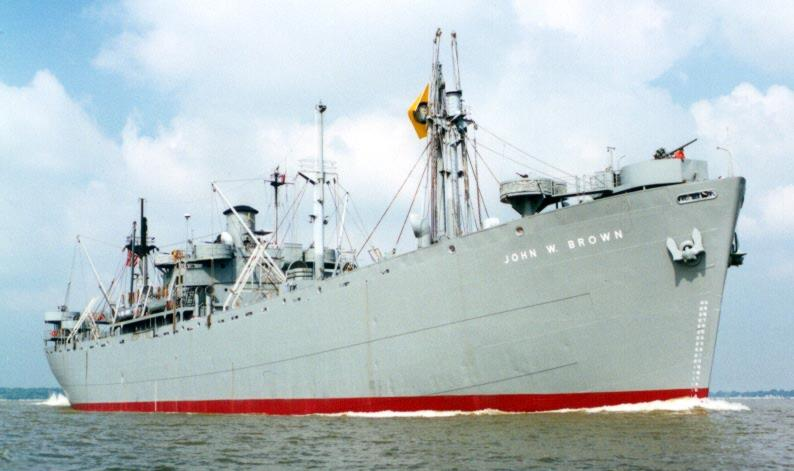
- SS John W. Brown is one of only two surviving operational Liberty ships. Abner Doubleday was identical.

History

United States
- Name: Abner Doubleday
- Namesake: Abner Doubleday
- Builder: Oregon Shipbuilding
- Laid down: 25 October 1942
- Launched: 20 November 1942
- Identification: Maritime Commission hull number 598
- Fate: Scrapped 1968

General characteristics
- Type: Cargo ship
- Displacement: 14,245 long tons (14,474 t)
- Length: 135 m (442 ft 11 in)
- Beam: 17.3 m (56 ft 9 in)
- Draft: 8.5 m (27 ft 11 in)
- Propulsion: Two oil-fired boilers, triple-expansion steam engine, single screw, 2,500 hp (1,900 kW)
- Speed: 11 to 11.5 knots (20.4 to 21.3 km/h; 12.7 to 13.2 mph)
- Range: 23,000 mi (37,000 km)
- Capacity: 10,856 DWT
- Complement: 41
- Armament: Stern-mounted 4 in (102 mm) deck gun for use against surfaced submarines, variety of anti-aircraft guns

SS Abner Doubleday was a Liberty ship built during World War II. The ship was named after Abner Doubleday, the brigadier general of the American Civil War. Her keel was laid down on 25 October 1942 and she launched 20 November 1942. Abner Doubleday was scrapped in 1968. The photo is of the identical ship the SS John W. Brown which is docked in Baltimore. There are only two liberty ships left, the SS John W. Brown and the SS Jeremiah O'Brien in San Francisco.

On November 30, 1942, she was turned over to the Sword Line Inc. for operation in support of the war. On May 31, 1943, she was turned over to the Marine Transport Lines for operations. On September 30, 1946, she was placed in the National Reserve fleet in Mobile, Alabama. On February 22, 1947, she was turned over to the Alcoa Steamship Company for operations. She was scrapped at the Southern Scrap Material in Texas in 1968.
