= Star of Oregon (event) =

- Date: 1840 to 1843
- Location: Oregon Country North America
- Participants: Joseph Gale; Thomas J. Hubbard; Josiah Lamberson Parrish

The Star of Oregon episode of American history began in 1840 and ended in 1843. This enterprise by pioneers in the Willamette Valley of present-day Oregon consisted of building a ship they named Star of Oregon and then sailing it to California in order to bring back cattle to Oregon Country. The group was led by Joseph Gale and received assistance from Captain Wilkes of the United States Navy prior to setting sail on the open ocean. These pioneers were able to procure nearly 4,000 head of cattle, sheep, and horses combined.

== Background ==
In 1837, the Willamette Cattle Company had brought over 600 head of cattle to Oregon via California. Prior to this, virtually all cattle in the region were owned by the Hudson's Bay Company (HBC). While the events of 1837 had broken the HBC's monopoly, most of the cattle were still owned by a few individuals such as Ewing Young, John McLoughlin, and the Methodist Mission. The independent settlers of the Willamette Valley were left in the same situation as before, so they met and came up with a plan to alleviate their need for cattle. The group decided to build a ship, sail it to California, trade the ship there for cattle, and then drive the cattle overland back to Oregon. In the early stages of planning, Joseph Gale, an experienced sailor, was asked to assist on the project and serve as captain once they got further along in the building.

== Ship construction ==
Construction of the ship began in 1840 on Swan Island in present-day Portland, Oregon. There the ship was built under the guidance of Felix Hathaway, a ship's carpenter. On May 19, 1841, the ship was launched into the water, but only after Hathaway left the project for lack of pay. Construction then moved upriver to Oak Island to complete the vessel.

As the area lacked many industries at the time, supplies were difficult to acquire. This was made more difficult when Hudson's Bay Company doctor John McLoughlin denied the shipbuilders requests to purchase supplies from Fort Vancouver. McLoughlin claimed he did not think the boat would be seaworthy and even if it was able to set sail that the owners might attempt piracy with the ship. Therefore, the builders covertly procured supplies elsewhere, mainly through buying from other settlers. Additionally, the Methodist Mission’s blacksmith Josiah Lamberson Parrish made metal spikes needed for the ship, and Thomas J. Hubbard also made spikes for the ship.

As construction progressed, the builders needed more and more materials to complete the boat. Coincidentally, in the summer of 1841, Captain Charles Wilkes of the United States Navy arrived on the Columbia River as part of the United States Exploring Expedition. While inland, he learned of the construction of the ship. Wilkes then impressed upon McLoughlin to change his position regarding the sale of supplies to the builders, including an offer to pay for any supplies the Americans were unable to buy. McLoughlin agreed, allowing the shipbuilders to buy the remaining items needed, namely canvas and rigging.

Even with a seaworthy craft, the builders also needed to get official papers to allow them to freely sail the ocean. Once again Captain Wilkes was able to provide this necessity, but not before testing Captain Gale on his sailing and navigation skills. Gale passed the test, and Wilkes presented papers to the crew along with a compass, kedge anchor, log line, two log glasses, and an American flag. As October approached, the builders halted construction for the winter. The ship was completed the next year, in August 1842, and Gale began training his crew as they sailed down the Willamette River. They named the completed vessel Star of Oregon.

The ship and crew set sail for California on August 29, 1842, leaving the Willamette River and sailing past Fort Vancouver. As the ship progressed down the Columbia River, Captain Gale continued to train the rest of the crew in sailing. On September 12, the Star of Oregon left the Columbia and entered the open ocean. The day before, Gale met with Captain John H. Couch aboard Couch's brig Chenamus when Couch offered to lead the way out of the river's mouth.

== Execution ==
Once on the ocean, Gale stayed at the helm for approximately 36 hours straight through the fog and rain. He elected to sail out 35 miles (56 km) from the coast and then head south due to the ship's lack of charts. While sailing south the ship nearly hit rocks as they cruised too close to shore in the fog. On September 17, 1842, the Star of Oregon and her crew reached San Francisco Bay. They stopped at the Old Presidio and presented their papers to the Mexican officials, who then allowed them to proceed to Yerba Buena.

Once in Yerba Buena (present-day San Francisco), a passenger named Mr. Pfeffenhauser disembarked to continue his journey to find his relative John Sutter. The ship was sold to a Frenchman, Joseph Yves Limantour, in a three-way transaction. Limantour was in need of a new vessel since in October 1841, the merchant's schooner Ayacucho had gone aground near Point Reyes. Limantour did not have cattle, but General Mariano Guadalupe Vallejo, Commander General of California, did. Vallejo owned a substantial rancho in Sonoma with plenty of cattle. Vallejo received merchandise from Limantour, the Oregonians received 350 head of cattle from Vallejo, and Limantour received the ship. The vessel was then renamed the Jóven Fanita in honor of General Vallejo's seven-year-old daughter, Epifania.

The Star of Oregon crew did not immediately head back north, as Gale thought it best to wait out the winter and attempt to recruit more people for the overland journey. Kilbourne then dropped out and decided to stay. Meanwhile, Gale sent out several circulars to attempt to recruit more people to settle in Oregon. Once spring came and the crew gathered at Cash Creek there were now a total of 42 people ready to head north to Oregon Country. This party started north with 1,250 head of cattle, 600 horses and mules, and 3,000 sheep. The journey overland took 75 days, and in mid-May 1843, they arrived back in the Willamette Valley of the Oregon Country.

== Legacy ==
The enterprise brought the first Spanish Merino sheep to Oregon, and allowed for greater economic independence of the pioneers. Joseph Gale was elected to the provisional government of Oregon a few months later as one of three members of the executive committee at the Champoeg Meetings.

== Participants ==
=== Shipbuilding ===
Those participating in the construction of the vessel included George Davis, Henry Wood, Joseph Gale, Felix Hathaway, John Canan, Pleasant Armstrong, Ralph Kilbourne, and Jacob Green.

=== Journey ===
- Known participants: Joseph Gale, John Canan, Pleasant Armstrong, Ralph Kilbourne, Jacob Green.
- Passenger: Charles Pfeffenhauser
