= Pleasant M. Armstrong =

American pioneer (1810–1853)

- Born: 1810; Knox County, Tennessee, US
- Died: August 24, 1853 (aged 42–43); Jackson County, Oregon, US
- Occupations: Ship builder, soldier
- Known for: Early Oregon Trail Pioneer; Voted for the Oregon Provisional Government at Champoeg
- Spouse: Jane Smith

Pleasant M. Armstrong (1810 – August 24, 1853) was an American pioneer in Oregon Country in an area that would become the state of Oregon, United States. He helped build a ship that was sailed to California to exchange for cattle, and voted at the May 2, 1843, Champoeg Meeting.

== Oregon Country ==
Armstrong immigrated to the Oregon Country in 1840. In 1842, he settled a farm in the Yamhill Valley, in what is now Yamhill County, Oregon. During this time he helped build the Star of Oregon along with Felix Hathaway, John Canan, Ralph Kilbourne, Henry Woods, George Davis, Jacob Green, and later Joseph Gale. The ship was then sailed to California where it was sold in a three-way deal where the Oregon pioneers received cattle. Armstrong and the others then drove 1,250 head of cattle, 600 horses and mules, and 3,000 sheep overland back to Oregon, arriving in early 1843.

On May 2, 1843, Pleasant Armstrong attended the meetings held at Champoeg, Oregon, where the pioneer settlers voted on whether to form a government. Armstrong voted for the creation of a government, and that faction won with a vote of 52–50, creating the Provisional Government of Oregon. In 1845, he married fellow Champoeg participant Alvin T. Smith’s daughter, Jane Smith.

When troubles in Southern Oregon led to the Rogue River Wars, Armstrong volunteered. On August 24, 1853, he was killed in action at Pleasant Creek in Jackson County, which now is named in his memory. His body was never recovered.
