= Eastern Sword =

Steam merchant ship

History
- Name: Eastern Sword
- Owner: Sword Steam Ship Line Inc.
- Operator: Alcoa Steamship Co.
- Port of registry: (United States) New York City
- Builder: Uraga Dry Dock Co. Ltd, Uraga
- Yard number: 166
- Completed: August 1920
- Fate: Torpedoed and sunk on 4 May 1942

General characteristics
- Type: Merchant ship
- Tonnage: 3,785 GRT
- Length: 330 ft 5 in (100.7 m)
- Beam: 46 ft 3 in (14.1 m)
- Installed power: Triple expansion steam engine
- Propulsion: 1 shaft
- Speed: 10 knots (19 km/h; 12 mph)

Eastern Sword was an unarmed 3,785-ton steam merchant ship that was completed in 1920 at the Uraga Dry Dock Co. Ltd, Uraga, Japan. She was owned by the Sword Line Inc., New York, New York, and she was homeported out of this same city. The vessel was torpedoed and sunk on 4 May 1942 by the German submarine U-162 about twelve miles (19 km) off the Georgetown Light, Trinidad. 13 of the 38 crew survived.

== Description ==
Eastern Sword was a steam-powered merchant ship that measured 3,785 gross register tons (GRT), was 330 ft 5 in (100.7 m) long between perpendiculars with a beam of 46 ft 3 in (14.1 m). The vessel was powered by a triple expansion steam engine turning one propeller and had a maximum speed of 10 knots (19 km/h; 12 mph). The vessel was constructed by the Uraga Dry Dock Co. Ltd in Uraga, Japan with the yard number 166 and completed in August 1920. The ship was constructed on behalf of the United States Government and acquired by the Sword Steam Ship Line Inc. in 1931. Eastern Sword was registered in New York, New York.

== Sinking ==
Eastern Sword, operated by Alcoa Steamship Company, departed New York with seven officers and twenty-nine crew members, en route to Georgetown, British Guiana in ballast to pick up a load of bauxite. The vessel made a stop at Trinidad and for the entire route, she was unescorted. At about 0345 on 4 May 1942, she was torpedoed by the German submarine U-162 about twelve miles (19 km) off the Georgetown Light, Trinidad. The ship had been traveling at 9 knots (17 km/h; 10 mph) when attacked. Two torpedoes struck in quick succession on the port side at the #4 hold, aft of the midship house, causing the ship to settle rapidly by the stern. The ship sank quickly on an even keel with 15 feet (4.6 m) of her mainmast above water at 7°10′N 57°58′W. The explosion had destroyed the radio shack, preventing a distress message from being sent. Three officers and nine crewmen abandoned ship in one lifeboat and landed the next day at Georgetown. One crewman was picked up from a raft by the fishing boat Ocean Star on 6 May and landed in Georgetown. The remaining crew were lost.
