= SS Carroll Victory =

United States Merchant Marine ship

- Typical Victory ship

History

United States
- Name: Carroll Victory
- Namesake: Carroll, Iowa
- Owner: War Shipping Administration (WSA)
- Operator: Lykes Brothers Steamship Company
- Builder: California Shipbuilding Company, Los Angeles
- Laid down: 28 March 1944
- Launched: 13 June 1944
- Completed: 31 August 1944
- Fate: Transferred to United States Coast Guard, 1949

United States
- Name: Carroll Victory
- Operator: United States Coast Guard
- Identification: IMO number: 5065043
- Fate: Scrapped, 1994

General characteristics
- Class & type: VC2-S-AP3 Victory ship
- Tonnage: 7,612 GRT, 4,553 NRT
- Displacement: 15,200 tons
- Length: 455 ft (139 m)
- Beam: 62 ft (19 m)
- Draft: 28 ft (8.5 m)
- Installed power: 8,500 shp (6,300 kW)
- Propulsion: HP & LP turbines geared to a single 20.5-foot (6.2 m) propeller
- Speed: 16.5 knots (30.6 km/h; 19.0 mph)
- Boats & landing craft carried: 4 lifeboats
- Complement: 62 Merchant Marine and 28 US Naval Armed Guards
- Armament: 1 × 5-inch (127 mm)/38 caliber gun; 1 × 3-inch (76 mm)/50 caliber gun; 8 × 20 mm Oerlikon

SS Carroll Victory was the twenty-seventh Victory ship built during the World War II under the Emergency Shipbuilding program. She was launched by the California Shipbuilding Company on June 13, 1944, and completed on August 31, 1944. The ship was named after Carroll, Iowa. The ship's United States Maritime Commission designation was VC2-S-AP3 with a hull number 27 (V-27). She was operated by the Lykes Brothers Steamship Company and she served in the Atlantic Ocean during World War II. The Carroll was one of the new 10,500-ton class ship known as Victory ships that were designed to replace the earlier Liberty Ships. Unlike Liberty ships, Victory ships were designed to last longer and serve the US Navy after the war. The Victory ships differed from Liberty ships in that they were faster, longer and wider, taller, had a thinner stack set farther toward the superstructure, and had a long raised forecastle.

From 1945 to 1947 the United Nations Relief and Rehabilitation Administration and the Brethren Service Committee of the Church of the Brethren sent livestock to war-torn countries. These "seagoing cowboys" made about 360 trips on 73 different ships. The Heifers for Relief project was started by the Church of the Brethren in 1942; in 1953 this became Heifer International. The SS Carroll Victory was one of these ships, known as cowboy ships, as she moved livestock across the Atlantic Ocean. In the summer of 1946 she took horses and hay bales to Poland. In November 1946, she delivered a number of horses to Kavalla, Greece. From Greece she steamed to Africa and picked up a new load of horses, then steamed on to Haifa in Palestine. Carroll Victory moved horses, heifers, and mules as well as some chicks, rabbits, and goats.

In 1948 she was operated by the Sword Line Inc. for one year for post war work. In 1949 she was transferred to Mobile, Alabama, and served as a US Coast Guard ship. After completing her US Coast Guard work in she was moved to the James River in Virginia as part of the National Defense Reserve Fleet.

== Korean War ==
SS Carroll Victory served as merchant marine ship supplying goods for the Korean War. About 75 percent of the personnel taking to Korea for the Korean War came by the merchant marine ship. SS Carroll Victory transported goods, mail, food and other supplies. About 90 percent of the cargo was moved by merchant marine naval to the war zone. SS Bucknell Victory made trips between 1950 and 1952, helping American forces engaged against Communist aggression in South Korea. In 1952 she was returned to the National Defense Reserve Fleet.

In 1994 she was scrapped at Alang, India.

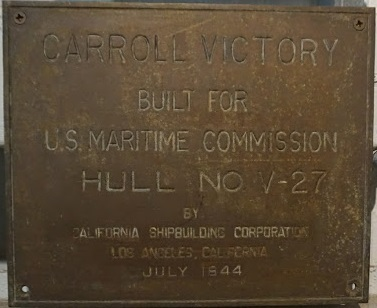
Builder plate from the Victory steamship Carroll Victory

== See also ==
- List of Victory ships
- Liberty ship
- Type C1 ship
- Type C2 ship
- Type C3 ship

== Sources ==
- Sawyer, L.A. and W.H. Mitchell. Victory ships and tankers: The history of the ‘Victory’ type cargo ships and of the tankers built in the United States of America during World War II, Cornell Maritime Press, 1974, 0-87033-182-5.
- United States Maritime Commission:
- Victory Cargo Ships
