= German submarine U-162 (1941) =

German World War II submarine

Coordinates: 12°21′N 59°29′W

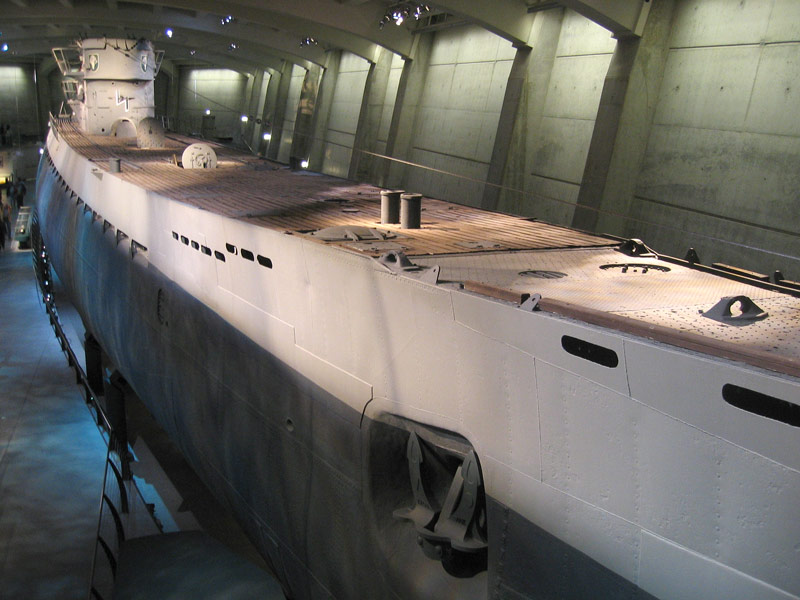
- U-505, a typical Type IXC boat

History

Nazi Germany
- Name: U-162
- Ordered: 25 September 1939
- Builder: DeSchiMAG, Bremen
- Yard number: 701
- Laid down: 19 April 1940
- Launched: 1 March 1941
- Commissioned: 9 September 1941
- Fate: Sunk on 3 September 1942
- Badge

General characteristics
- Class & type: Type IXC submarine
- Displacement: 1,120 t (1,100 long tons) surfaced; 1,232 t (1,213 long tons) submerged
- Length: 76.76 m (251 ft 10 in) o/a; 58.75 m (192 ft 9 in) pressure hull
- Beam: 6.76 m (22 ft 2 in) o/a; 4.40 m (14 ft 5 in) pressure hull
- Height: 9.60 m (31 ft 6 in)
- Draught: 4.70 m (15 ft 5 in)
- Installed power: 4,400 PS (3,200 kW; 4,300 bhp) (diesels); 1,000 PS (740 kW; 990 shp) (electric)
- Propulsion: 2 shafts; 2 × diesel engines; 2 × electric motors
- Speed: 18.3 knots (33.9 km/h; 21.1 mph) surfaced; 7.3 knots (13.5 km/h; 8.4 mph) submerged
- Range: 13,450 nmi (24,910 km; 15,480 mi) at 10 knots (19 km/h; 12 mph) surfaced; 64 nmi (119 km; 74 mi) at 4 knots (7.4 km/h; 4.6 mph) submerged
- Test depth: 230 m (750 ft)
- Complement: 4 officers, 44 enlisted
- Armament: 6 × torpedo tubes (4 bow, 2 stern); 22 × 53.3 cm (21 in) torpedoes; 1 × 10.5 cm (4.1 in) SK C/32 deck gun (180 rounds); 1 × 3.7 cm (1.5 in) SK C/30 AA gun; 1 × twin 2 cm FlaK 30 AA guns

Service record
- Part of: 4th U-boat Flotilla; 9 September 1941 – 31 January 1942; 2nd U-boat Flotilla; 1 February – 3 September 1942
- Identification codes: M 01 524
- Commanders: F.Kapt. Jürgen Wattenberg; 9 September 1941 – 3 September 1942
- Operations: 3 patrols: 1st patrol: 7 February – 18 March 1942; 2nd patrol: 7 April – 8 June 1942; 3rd patrol: 7 July – 3 September 1942
- Victories: 14 merchant ships sunk (82,027 GRT)

German submarine U-162 was a Type IXC U-boat of Nazi Germany's Kriegsmarine during World War II.

She was ordered on 25 September 1939 and was laid down on 19 April 1940 at Deutsche Schiff- und Maschinenbau AG, at Seebeck Yard in Bremerhaven, Germany, as yard number 701. She was launched on 1 March 1941 and commissioned under the command of Korvettenkapitän Jürgen Wattenberg on 9 September of that year.

During three war patrols, U-162 sank 14 vessels. However, on 3 September 1942, three British destroyers hunted U-162 down and sank her. Of a crew of fifty-one, only two died. The remainder were taken prisoner and sent to camps in the United States, where they were to remain for the rest of the war.

== Design ==
German Type IXC submarines were slightly larger than the original Type IXBs. U-162 had a displacement of 1,120 tonnes (1,100 long tons) when at the surface and 1,232 tonnes (1,213 long tons) while submerged. The U-boat had a total length of 76.76 m (251 ft 10 in), a pressure hull length of 58.75 m (192 ft 9 in), a beam of 6.76 m (22 ft 2 in), a height of 9.60 m (31 ft 6 in), and a draught of 4.70 m (15 ft 5 in). The submarine was powered by two MAN M 9 V 40/46 supercharged four-stroke, nine-cylinder diesel engines producing a total of 4,400 metric horsepower (3,240 kW; 4,340 shp) for use while surfaced, two Siemens-Schuckert 2 GU 345/34 double-acting electric motors producing a total of 1,000 metric horsepower (740 kW; 990 shp) for use while submerged. She had two shafts and two 1.92 m (6 ft) propellers. The boat was capable of operating at depths of up to 230 metres (750 ft).

The submarine had a maximum surface speed of 18.3 knots (33.9 km/h; 21.1 mph) and a maximum submerged speed of 7.3 knots (13.5 km/h; 8.4 mph). When submerged, the boat could operate for 63 nautical miles (117 km; 72 mi) at 4 knots (7.4 km/h; 4.6 mph); when surfaced, she could travel 13,450 nautical miles (24,910 km; 15,480 mi) at 10 knots (19 km/h; 12 mph). U-162 was fitted with six 53.3 cm (21 in) torpedo tubes (four fitted at the bow and two at the stern), 22 torpedoes, one 10.5 cm (4.13 in) SK C/32 naval gun, 180 rounds, and a 3.7 cm (1.5 in) SK C/30 as well as a 2 cm (0.79 in) C/30 anti-aircraft gun. The boat had a complement of forty-eight.

== Service history ==
=== First patrol ===
Following training exercises with the 4th U-boat Flotilla from 9 September 1941 to 31 January 1942, U-162 began her first war patrol as the lead boat of the 2nd U-boat Flotilla on 1 February 1942. She left her home port of Kiel on 7 February and ventured into the North Sea without stopping in occupied Norway. During 40 days at sea, U-162 sailed north of the British Isles and entered the North Atlantic, where she sank her first vessel, White Crest, on 24 February 1942.

=== Second patrol ===
U-162 returned to sea on 7 April 1942. For this patrol, she cruised south into the Caribbean Sea and the northern coast of South America. During her 63 days at sea, U-162 sank nine ships: Athelempress, Parnahyba, Eastern Sword, Florence M. Douglas, Frank Seamans, Mont Louis, Esso Houston, British Colony and Beth. Following these victories, U-162 returned to her new home port of Lorient on 8 June 1942.

=== Third patrol and sinking ===
U-162's third and final sortie began on 7 July 1942, when she left Lorient for the last time. Much like her second foray, U-162 spent her third patrol in the Caribbean Sea and off the coast of South America. From 19 to 30 August, she sank four more vessels: West Celina, Moena, Thelma and Star of Oregon. Nonetheless, just four days after sinking Star of Oregon, she was detected northeast of Trinidad. Three British destroyers, HMS Vimy, Pathfinder and Quentin, attacked and sank U-162 with depth charges. Two crewmen were killed, while 49 others survived.

Following the sinking of U-162, the surviving crew members were picked up by the three destroyers and sent to the United States where they gave US interrogators information about U-162's history, including where and when she was laid down, how many ships she sank and details about her home port and the design and layout of submarines that were in her class.

=== Summary of raiding history ===
Date	Name	Nationality	Tonnage (GRT)	Fate
24 February 1942	White Crest	United Kingdom	4,365	Sunk
30 April 1942	Athelempress	United Kingdom	8,941	Sunk
1 May 1942	Parnahyba	Brazil	6,692	Sunk
4 May 1942	Eastern Sword	United States	3,785	Sunk
4 May 1942	Florence M. Douglas	United Kingdom	119	Sunk
7 May 1942	Frank Seamans	Norway	4,271	Sunk
9 May 1942	Mont Louis	Canada	1,905	Sunk
13 May 1942	Esso Houston	United States	7,699	Sunk
14 May 1942	British Colony	United Kingdom	6,917	Sunk
18 May 1942	Beth	Norway	6,852	Sunk
19 August 1942	West Celina	United States	5,722	Sunk
24 August 1942	Moena	Netherlands	9,286	Sunk
26 August 1942	Thelma	Norway	8,297	Sunk
30 August 1942	Star of Oregon	United States	7,176	Sunk

== See also ==
- Battle of the Atlantic

== Bibliography ==
- Busch, Rainer; Röll, Hans-Joachim (1999). German U-boat commanders of World War II : a biographical dictionary. Translated by Brooks, Geoffrey. London, Annapolis, Md: Greenhill Books, Naval Institute Press. ISBN 1-55750-186-6.
- Busch, Rainer; Röll, Hans-Joachim (1999). Deutsche U-Boot-Verluste von September 1939 bis Mai 1945 [German U-boat losses from September 1939 to May 1945]. Der U-Boot-Krieg (in German). Vol. IV. Hamburg, Berlin, Bonn: Mittler. ISBN 3-8132-0514-2.
- Gröner, Erich; Jung, Dieter; Maass, Martin (1991). U-boats and Mine Warfare Vessels. German Warships 1815–1945. Vol. 2. Translated by Thomas, Keith; Magowan, Rachel. London: Conway Maritime Press. ISBN 0-85177-593-4.
