= Felix Hathaway =

American carpenter and pioneer

- Born: 1798; Massachusetts
- Died: March 6, 1856 (aged 58); Vancouver, California
- Occupations: Gunsmith, carpenter
- Spouse: Mary Sargeant

Felix Hathaway (1798 – March 6, 1856) was an American carpenter and pioneer in what became the state of Oregon. A native of New England, he settled in the Oregon Country where he helped construct the first American-built ship in what became the state of Oregon. His home was used for the first meeting of the Provisional Legislature of Oregon in 1844.

== Early life ==
Felix Hathaway was born in 1798 in Massachusetts. There he became a gunsmith and carpenter. He sailed on the schooner Convoy to the northwest coast of North America. This fur-trading vessel arrived at the mouth of the Columbia River in March 1829, at the same time as the William and Ann, which sunk after running aground. Hathaway was sometimes incorrectly mentioned as the sole survivor of that wreck.

== Oregon Country ==
He settled in the Willamette Valley near the mouth of the Chehalem River in 1835, and remained there until 1840. In 1841, he married a member of the Molala tribe named Mary Sargeant. That year he also became involved with the Star of Oregon. Hathaway was hired by a group that included Ralph Kilbourne and Pleasant Armstrong to serve as the carpenter and superintendent of the shipbuilding project. The plan was to build a schooner to be used for a venture to buy cattle in California and then to drive the cattle back overland after selling the ship. Construction began on Swan Island in what is now Portland, Oregon, but Hathaway quit about halfway through construction partly because he had not been paid for his work. Joseph Gale and Kilbourne successfully finished the vessel and completed the cattle-buying enterprise.

Hathaway then moved to Oregon City where he was hired by the Methodist Mission to build a house on Abernathy Island at Willamette Falls in 1841. He soon had to stop due to a dispute between the mission and John McLoughlin of the Hudson's Bay Company. The dispute—over ownership of both the island and the city—would drag on for years and include legal action and legislation in Congress. In May 1843, settlers in the region voted to create a government at the Champoeg Meetings. Soon afterwards, Hathaway signed a petition sent to the United States Congress requesting the United States extend its jurisdiction over the region. The next year, the Provisional Legislature of Oregon was formed and held its first meeting at Hathaway's home in Oregon City on June 18, 1844.

== Later life ==
In 1845, Hathaway petitioned the Provisional Government of Oregon for divorce from his wife, which was granted. She had apparently often run away from Hathaway, and had only given consent to the marriage under duress from those whom controlled her at the time of the marriage. In June of that year Hathaway was one of the initial investors in the Oregon Spectator newspaper, investing $10. He died on March 6, 1856, in Vancouver, California, at the age of 58. During World War II a Liberty Ship built by the Oregon Shipbuilding Corporation was named in his honor.
