= USS Arcturus (AF-52) =

Cargo ship of the United States Navy

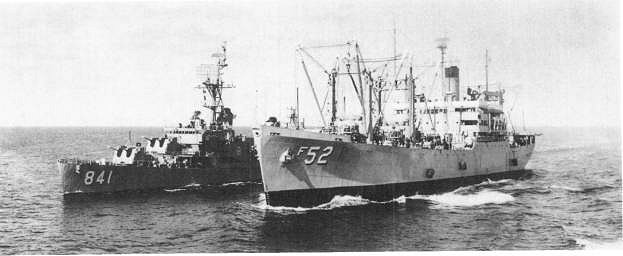

History

United States
- Ordered: as SS Golden Eagle; R2-S-BV1 hull, MC Hull 184
- Laid down: 8 December 1941
- Launched: 12 June 1943
- Commissioned: as USS Arcturus (AF-52), 18 November 1961
- Decommissioned: 16 May 1973
- Stricken: 9 December 1985
- Fate: Sunk as a target, 24 July 1997

General characteristics
- Displacement: 6,319 t.(lt)
- Length: 469 ft (143 m)
- Beam: 63 ft (19 m)
- Draught: 26 ft (7.9 m)
- Propulsion: cross-compound turbines, single propeller
- Speed: 15.5 kts.
- Complement: as (T-AF-52), 64
- Armament: unknown

USS Arcturus (AF-52) was an Alstede class stores ship stores ship acquired by the U.S. Navy. Her task was to carry stores, refrigerated items, and equipment to ships in the fleet, and to remote stations and staging areas.

The fifth Navy vessel to be named Arcturus, AF-52 was laid down on 8 December 1941 at Oakland, California, by the Moore Dry Dock Co. under a United States Maritime Commission contract (MC hull 184) as Golden Eagle; launched on 15 March 1942; sponsored by Mrs. John B. McKee; and delivered to the War Shipping Administration (WSA) on 23 April 1943. She was operated under WSA charter by the United Fruit Co. until 1946 and, thereafter by the Sword Line Inc. and the United States Lines. LTJG Sam Bell Damage Control Officer, OOD in formation cruising, 1964–1967

== Assigned to the Army Transportation Corps ==
Between October 1948 and early 1950, she served the Army Transportation Corps as USAT Golden Eagle.

== Assigned to the Military Sea Transportation Service ==
In March 1950, Golden Eagle was transferred from the United States Maritime Commission to the Navy and was assigned to the Military Sea Transportation Service (MSTS) as USNS Golden Eagle (T-AF-52).

== Return to the Navy as AF-52 with a civilian crew ==
Designated AF-52 and run by a Navy crew, Golden Eagle operated out of New York carrying supplies to American bases in the North Atlantic Ocean, Europe, and the Mediterranean. During November and December 1950, she was deployed to the Mediterranean for provisioning operations and, through the first six months of 1951, carried cargo to Bremerhaven and Liverpool. Following a second stint of service in the Mediterranean, she departed New York on 3 August for logistics duty off Thule, North Star Bay, Greenland. Returning to New York on 13 September, she resumed transatlantic service on the 19th.

Between 1952 and 1961, Golden Eagle made regular runs to ports in western Europe. Operating out of New York, Boston, Baltimore, and Norfolk, she steamed to Bremerhaven, Liverpool, and Rotterdam. During August and September 1952 and 1953, she supplied ships participating in Operation Blue Jay at Thule. Cargo missions in the North Atlantic sent her to Newfoundland, Iceland, and Baffin Island.

== Commissioned with a Navy crew ==
Following her return from European waters to New York in the summer of 1961, Golden Eagle entered the New York Naval Shipyard to begin modifications to prepare her to become a commissioned ship. She was renamed Arcturus on 13 October 1961 and placed in commission at New York on 18 November 1961. shakedown training in the West Indies and post-shakedown repairs at the Maryland Shipbuilding & Drydock Co. in Baltimore, Maryland, occupied her until the summer of 1962.

In June 1962, Arcturus stood out of Norfolk, Virginia, on her first deployment to the Mediterranean as a unit of the U.S. 6th Fleet. Over the next decade, the ship provided logistics support for Navy forces operating in the Mediterranean Sea and in the West Indies. During most years, she served three tours of duty resupplying ships of the U.S. 6th Fleet. In between those assignments, Arcturus made logistics support voyages to the West Indies, conducted type training, and participated in multiship exercises. Regular overhauls periodically interrupted that schedule and, when they occurred, usually limited her to one or two deployments to the Mediterranean for the year in question.

LTJG Dorsey served as Supply Officer from 1964 to 1966. LTJG Curry served as Deck Officer, then Navigator from 1965 to 1968.

== Decommissioning ==
Late in 1972, as she prepared for the 24th Mediterranean deployment of her Navy career, her refrigeration compressor system broke down completely. Early in October, the Navy decided to inactivate her. On 2 November, Arcturus began preparations for decommissioning. She was placed out of commission at the Naval Amphibious Base, Little Creek, Virginia, on 16 March 1973. On 18 October 1973, Arcturus was transferred to the Maritime Administration and berthed with the National Defense Reserve Fleet's contingent in Virginia's James River. Her name was struck from the Navy list on 1 October 1976. In December 1985, she was authorized for use as a target to destruction. Final Disposition: sunk as a target, 24 July 1997. Sunk by Naval Gunfire from the USS Cole (DDG-67) at 35°48′35″N 073°06′57″W.

== Military awards and honors ==
Her crew was eligible for the following medal:

- National Defense Service Medal
