= SS Louise Lykes (1941) =

American steamship 1941-43

History
- Name: Louise Lykes
- Owner: Lykes Brothers Steamship Company
- Port of registry: (United States) New Orleans
- Builder: Federal Shipbuilding; Kearny, New Jersey
- Yard number: 180
- Launched: 27 September 1941
- Completed: October 1941
- Fate: Sunk, 9 January 1943

General characteristics
- Type: Type C2-F ship
- Tonnage: 6,155 GRT
- Length: 439 ft 0 in (133.81 m)
- Beam: 63 ft 1 in (19.23 m)
- Draft: 27 ft 5 in (8.36 m)
- Decks: two plus shelter deck
- Propulsion: 2 General Electric steam turbines, geared to a single screw propeller
- Speed: 15.5 knots (28.7 km/h)
- Crew: 10 officers, 41 sailors, 32 Naval Armed Guardsmen (83 total)
- Armament: 1 × single 4 in (100 mm) gun; 2 × single 3 in (76 mm) guns; 8 × single 20 mm AA guns

SS Louise Lykes was a Type C2-F ship built in 1941 at Federal Shipbuilding of Kearny, New Jersey. She sailed for the Lykes Brothers Steamship Company out of New Orleans, Louisiana. On 9 January 1943, she was sunk with all hands in the North Atlantic by the German submarine U-384.

== Career ==
Louise Lykes was laid down at Federal Shipbuilding of Kearny, New Jersey, and launched on 27 September 1941. After her October 1941 completion, she was delivered to her owners, the Lykes Brothers Steamship Company, and registered at New Orleans, Louisiana. Very little information on the earliest parts of Louise Lykes' career are reported in secondary sources, but some time after the United States entered World War II in December 1941, the ship was armed with one 4-inch (10 cm), two 3-inch (7.6 cm), and eight 20-millimetre (0.79 in) guns, and a Naval Armed Guard detachment to man them.

Information on most of Louise Lykes' wartime activities is also absent from secondary sources, but she is recorded as sailing in Convoy UGF 2 from Hampton Roads, Virginia, to Casablanca in November 1942 with 21 other merchant vessels, and the return convoy, GUF 2, which returned to Hampton Roads on 11 December. Both convoys were escorted across the Atlantic by the American battleship Arkansas and other escorts and support ships. (Note: The additional vessels for UGF 2 were: destroyers Butler, Charles F. Hughes, Earle, Gleaves, Hilary P. Jones, Lansdale, Madison, Mayo, Niblack, Nicholson, and Plunkett; oiler Chicopee; and minelayer Terror. The eight destroyers accompanying Arkansas and GUF 2 were Benson, Chevalier, Gleaves, La Vallette, Mayo, Plunkett, Strong, and Taylor.)

Less than a month after her cruise to Casablanca and back, Louise Lykes departed from New York City for Belfast with a cargo of munitions. Sailing independently on a zig-zag course, she was discovered at 20:25 GWT (Note: GWT is German war time, the German name for Central European Time during World War II. See Browning, p. xi.) some 500 nautical miles (930 km) south-southeast of Iceland (Note: Louise Lykes' position is given as 58°55′N 23°40′W by Browning (p. 262) and as 56°15′N 22°0′W by Helgason.) by Oberleutnant zur See Hans-Achim von Rosenberg-Gruszcynski, in command of U-384. Lookouts on Louise Lykes spotted the German vessel and opened fire, straddling the submarine with misses. In response, von Rosenberg-Gruszcynski launched a spread of four torpedoes at the American vessel from a distance of 2,000 yards (1,800 m). Although two of the torpedoes were wide of the mark, the other pair did their job and struck home on the cargo ship, igniting her cargo and raining debris on the deck of U-384. After a crash dive to avoid damage at the hands of the exploded American ship, von Rosenberg-Gruszcynski surfaced after five minutes to find no trace of the ship afloat. Master Edwin J. Madden, 9 other officers, 41 crewmen, and 32 Naval Armed Guardsmen were killed in the attack on Louise Lykes, the first of two ships sunk by U-384 during the war.
