= Star of Oregon (ship) =

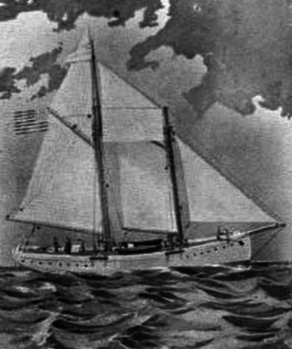
- Star of Oregon

History
- Laid down: 1840
- Launched: 1842, Willamette River, Oregon
- Fate: Sold 1843 in California
- Notes: Details

General characteristics
- Class & type: schooner
- Displacement: tons
- Length: 53 ft 8 in (16.36 m)
- Beam: 10 ft 9 in (3.28 m)
- Draught: 4 ft 6 in (1.37 m)
- Propulsion: sail

The Star of Oregon was a schooner sailing vessel of the mid-19th century used on the west coast of North America. It was the first American sailing ship built in what is now the U.S. state of Oregon. Pioneer settlers built the ship from 1840 to 1842 in order to sail it to California and exchange it for livestock. During World War II a Liberty ship was named the SS Star of Oregon in honor of the 19th century sailing vessel.

== Vessel design ==
Felix Hathaway, an experienced ship's carpenter and former employee of the Hudson's Bay Company, designed the Star of Oregon with input from Joseph Gale, an American fur trapper with deep water sailing experience. The Star was a small Baltimore clipper schooner, a highly maneuverable vessel with a shallow draft that Gale would have been familiar with as a boy living on the Chesapeake Bay.

Gale provided a detailed description of the Star in a letter to James W. Nesmith:

She was forty-eight feet and eight inches on the keel, and fifty-three feet and eight inches overall; that is, from night heads to taffrail, with ten feet and nine inches beam in the widest part, and drew, when in good ballast trim, four feet six inches of water. Her frame was of swamp white oak, her knees were of seasoned red fir roots, her beams and carlins were of seasoned red fir timber. She was clinker build and was of the Baltimore clipper model. She was planked with clear cedar planks dressed to plump one and one-fourth inches, which was spiked to every rib with a wrought-iron spike one-half inch square, driven through a three-eighth hole and clinched on the inner side; her timbers standing nine inches apart, a nail one-fourth inch was driven between each timber. Her deck was double, first a three-fourth board and over which, so to break joints, a plank of one and one-fourth inches, which obviated the necessity of pitch and rendered her deck perfectly watertight She was what is generally called fore and after; that is, she had no topsails, but simply foresail, mainsail, gib and flying gib. Her spars were made of the straight fir sticks and consisted of foremast, fore topmast, mainmast and main topmast, bowsprit and flying jibboom; thus equipped and painted black, with a small white ribbon running from stem to stern, she was one of the handsomest little crafts that ever sat upon the water.

== Construction ==
Construction of the Star of Oregon began in the autumn of 1840 with Felix Hathaway supervising, and John Canan, Ralph Kilbourne, Pleasant Armstrong, Henry Woods, Josiah Lamberson Parrish, George Davis, and Jacob Green providing less skilled labor. The crew began construction of the schooner on the east side of Swan Island (part of today's Portland, Oregon). In the spring of 1841, the project was jeopardized when Hathaway quit because of the group's inability to pay him, the advent of other more promising business opportunities, and his frustration over the lack of needed building materials. At the time of Hathaway's resignation, the keel of the schooner had been finished to just above the water line.

At this time, John Canan and Ralph Kilbourne went back to Joseph Gale and reminded him of his promise to assist on the project and serve as captain once they got further along in the building. Gale then went and inspected the ship to determine if it would be seaworthy, and after determining it was, he went home and sold his farm and farming equipment. After moving his family to Champoeg, Oregon, Gale then devoted much of the next year to completing the vessel. On May 19, 1841 the partially completed vessel was launched and moved up the Willamette River to near Oregon City. In the fall of 1841, George Davis and Henry Woods dropped out of the project, which reduced the number of partners to five. Kilbourne and Gale did most of the remaining work, while Thomas J. Hubbard did the blacksmithing. Although wood was plentiful in Oregon, construction of a ship required cordage, cloth for sails, and a range of other materials that were available only from the Hudson's Bay Company store at Fort Vancouver. John McLoughlin, Chief Factor at Fort Vancouver, was ill-disposed to provide these.

In serious trouble, the project was rescued by Lieutenant Charles Wilkes, Commander of the United States Exploring Expedition, who arrived in Oregon at about the time that Gale joined the project. Wilkes asked McLoughlin to sell the needed materials to the Americans as a personal favor, and the Chief Factor obliged. As a result, the project "purchased an ample supply of all the necessities that we needed, such as cordage, canvas, paints, oils, etc., etc., for which we paid the company in wheat and furs of different kinds." Work on the vessel continued until late October 1841, when the project was suspended for the winter and spring. In June 1842, work on the schooner resumed and the vessel was ready to sail in mid-August, nearly two years after the beginning of construction.

== California voyages ==
=== Sale ===
On reaching Yerba Buena, today's San Francisco, Gale and company found a man in need of a ship, Joseph Yves Limantour. In October 1841, the French merchant's schooner Ayucucho had gone aground near Point Reyes. Although much of the cargo was saved, Limantour was stranded in California with no means of transport.

During his time in northern California, Limantour sold his cargo for cash and credit to the local elite, but the value of the Ayucucho's cargo far exceeded the local capacity for purchase. General Mariano Guadalupe Vallejo, Commander General of California, was a major exception and he owned a substantial rancho in Sonoma with plenty of cattle. Gale and company wanted cattle, and Limantour wanted the schooner. In a three-way deal, Vallejo purchased the Star of Oregon for 350 cows, and then transferred ownership to Limantour. The Star of Oregon was renamed the Jóven Fanita in honor of General Vallejo's seven-year-old daughter, Epifania."

=== Jóven Fanita ===
In late 1842, Limantour loaded the Jóven Fanita with "the remainder of his goods and effects and sailed down the coast, stopping at the ports of Monterrey, Santa Barbara and San Pedro." On anchoring at San Pedro in January 1843, Limantour encountered demand for his cargo in the form of the newly appointed Governor of California, Manuel Micheltorena. Micheltorena had arrived in southern California in the summer of 1842 with several hundred ill-trained Mexican troops and little provision for their support. The Governor was desperate for cash and goods to support his army and to spare the locals their depredations. Micheltorena requested cash and merchandise in exchange for a draft of Mexican funds to be honored at Mazatlán. Limantour provided these (either voluntarily or under duress) and then sailed to Mazatlán at the Governor's request. He then returned with a second cargo of goods for Micheltorena, which was purchased with $10,221 in Mexican funds. Later, the Mexican government reimbursed Limantour $56,184 for the goods "confiscated" from the Jóven Fanita. Although the number of trips to and from Mexico in the small schooner is unclear, Limantour continued to use the schooner until it "became a total wreck."

== See also ==
- Star of Oregon (event)
