= SS Star of Oregon =

World War II Liberty ship of the United States

- A Liberty ship at sea

History

United States
- Name: Star of Oregon
- Namesake: Star of Oregon
- Builder: Oregon Shipbuilding Company, Portland, Oregon
- Yard number: 171
- Way number: 7
- Laid down: 19 May 1941
- Launched: 27 September 1941
- Completed: 31 December 1941
- Fate: Torpedoed and sunk off Tobago, 30 August 1942

General characteristics
- Class & type: Type EC2-S-C1 Liberty ship
- Displacement: 14,245 long tons (14,474 t)
- Length: 441 ft 6 in (134.57 m) o/a; 417 ft 9 in (127.33 m) p/p; 427 ft (130 m) w/l
- Beam: 57 ft (17 m)
- Draft: 27 ft 9 in (8.46 m)
- Propulsion: Two oil-fired boilers; Triple-expansion steam engine; 2,500 hp (1,900 kW); Single screw
- Speed: 11 knots (20 km/h; 13 mph)
- Range: 20,000 nmi (37,000 km; 23,000 mi)
- Capacity: 10,856 t (10,685 long tons) deadweight (DWT)
- Crew: 81
- Armament: Stern-mounted 4 in (100 mm) deck gun; Variety of anti-aircraft guns

SS Star of Oregon (MC hull number 171) was a Liberty ship built by the Oregon Shipbuilding Company of Portland, Oregon, and launched on 27 September 1941, the first of the 472 ships built by the company up to November 1945. The ship was named after the Star of Oregon, the first sailing ship built by American settlers in what is now the state of Oregon.

The ship was operated by the States Steamship Company of Portland, under contract from the War Shipping Administration (WSA). On 30 August 1942 she was torpedoed and sunk by U-162 north-east of Tobago at position 11.48°N 59.45°W. Those aboard were able to abandon ship without casualties.
