= Bethlehem Fairfield Shipyard =

Shipyard in the United States

Coordinates: 39°14′42.21″N 76°34′45.62″W

Bethlehem-Fairfield Shipyard, Inc.
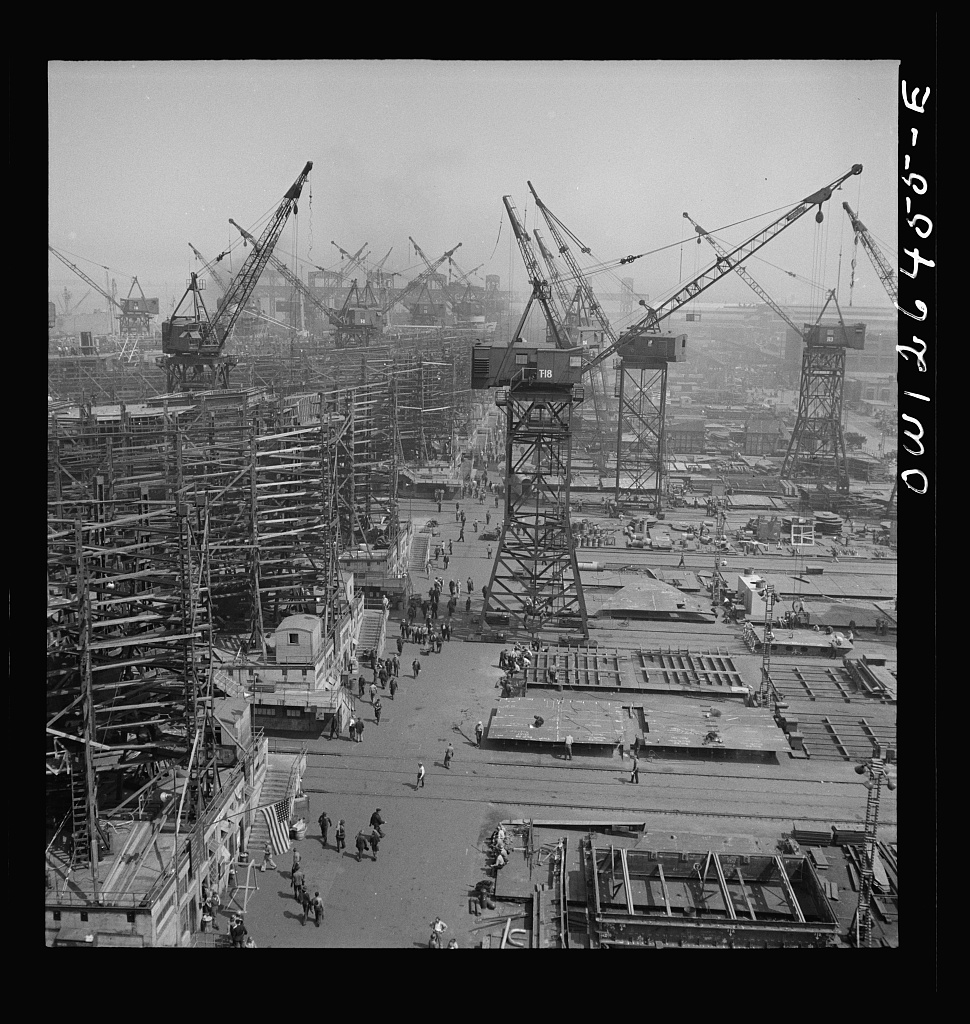
- A ship with a crane at the Bethlehem Fairfield Shipyard. Photograph by Arthur Siegel.
- Industry: Shipbuilding
- Founded: February 1941; 85 years ago near Wagner's Point, Fairfield, and Brooklyn-Curtis Bay in south Baltimore, Maryland
- Defunct: 1945
- Number of employees: 27,000
- Parent: Bethlehem Shipbuilding Company (Bethlehem Steel Corporation of Bethlehem, Pennsylvania)

The Bethlehem-Fairfield Shipyard of Baltimore, Maryland, was a shipyard in the United States from 1941 until 1945. Located on the south shore of the Middle Branch of the Patapsco River which serves as the Baltimore Harbor, it was owned by the Bethlehem Shipbuilding Company, created by the Bethlehem Steel Corporation of Bethlehem, Pennsylvania, which had operated a major waterfront steel mill outside Baltimore to the southeast at Sparrows Point, Maryland in Baltimore County since the 1880s.

The yard is now the location to the west of several heavy industrial firms with a focus on petro-chemicals, a later Maryland Shipbuilding and Drydock Company, which endured into the 1990s, and the underground south entrance of the Baltimore Harbor Tunnel, built in 1956–1957, carrying Interstate 895 and the Baltimore Harbor Tunnel Thruway through and under the city in the major East Coast thoroughfare.

Bethlehem-Fairfield was one of two new emergency shipyards, established by the Maritime Commission under the Emergency Shipbuilding program, in 1941. The other shipyard was the Oregon Shipbuilding Corporation, Portland, Oregon.

Because Baltimore Harbor is so old (dating to 1706) there was not sufficient space to build both the shipways and the fabrication plant in the same waterfront area. The fabricating plant was only less than two miles away further south in adjacent Curtis Bay at a former George Pullman railroad car wheel foundry dating from 1887, greatly expanded in 1916, with massive huge shops before World War I, but now empty during the Great Depression of the 1930s. This proved an advantageous situation though, which was better than other shipyards on the East Coast whose fabricating plants were usually located some further miles away. This allowed for easy transportation by railroad cars of the Baltimore and Ohio Railroad through its Curtis Bay Yards of the preassembled components and other sections needed for the assembly of the ship hulls to the storage yard at Fairfield where they would later be moved by cranes to one of the 13 ways used for erecting the ships, this was later expanded to 16 ways. Additional thousands of temporary wood-frame style barracks were constructed plus standardized brick row homes and housing projects soon filled woods and meadows of the neighboring Brooklyn-Curtis Bay-Fairfield-Wagner's Point waterfront communities dating to 1853 / 1887 / 1890s in southern Baltimore city, recently annexed in 1919 from neighboring rural Anne Arundel County

On 27 September 1941, Fairfield hosted Liberty Fleet Day, with the launching of their first Liberty Ship, SS Patrick Henry. She was the first of an eventual 384 Liberty ships built there, along with 45 LSTs, and 94 Victory ships.

== Notes ==
Citations

== Bibliography ==
Online resources

- "Fairfield Shipyard". GlobalSecurity.org. May 7, 2011.
- "Bethlehem-Fairfield, Baltimore MD". www.ShipbuildingHistory.com. August 14, 2008.
