= Medorem Crawford =

Oregon politician (1819–1891)

Member of the Provisional Legislature of Oregon
- In office 1847–1849
- Succeeded by: position dissolved
- Constituency: Clackamas District

Member of the Oregon House of Representatives
- In office 1860–1862
- Constituency: Yamhill County

Personal details
- Born: June 24, 1819 Orange County, New York, US
- Died: December 26, 1891 (aged 72) Dayton, Oregon, US
- Party: Republican
- Spouse(s): Adalene Brown (1843–1879); Eunice Burrows (1880–1893)

Medorem Crawford (June 24, 1819 – December 26, 1891) was an American soldier and politician in what became the state of Oregon. A native of the state of New York, he emigrated to the Oregon Country in 1842 where he participated in the Champoeg Meetings and served in the resulting Provisional Government of Oregon as a legislator. A Republican, he later served in the Oregon House of Representatives after statehood and was appointed to several federal government offices. During the American Civil War he escorted emigrants over the Oregon Trail.

== Early life ==
Medorem Crawford was born in Orange County, New York, on June 24, 1819, to S. G. Crawford. He was sent to apprentice as a farmer at age 13 to a farm in Seneca County where he remained until age 16. Crawford then settled in Havana in Schuyler County and lived there until 1842. On March 17, 1842, he began his journey to the Oregon Country with stops in Pittsburgh, Pennsylvania, Cincinnati, Ohio, and St. Louis, Missouri, before reaching Independence, Missouri, and the start of the Oregon Trail.

== Oregon ==
Crawford crossed the Great Plains with the Elijah White wagon train and arrived in the Willamette Valley in late 1842. He first settled in Salem where he taught at the Methodist Mission’s school for nine months. In 1843, he married Adalene Brown, whom he met on the trip to Oregon. They had five children; Medorem, Jr., Mary, Henrietta, John, and Frederick. Medorem, Jr. was the first white American male born on the west side of the Willamette River when delivered in January 1844.

Also in 1843 he bought part of James A. O'Neil’s land claim at Wheatland downriver from Salem. The Crawford family remained on the farm there until the fall of the next year. Crawford moved to Oregon City in April 1845 where he worked portaging goods around Willamette Falls for seven years. He moved to a farm on Joe McLoughlin’s old land claim at the mouth of the Yamhill River in 1852 and filed and received a Donation Land Claim on the property. Crawford retained his farm near Dayton in Yamhill County until his death.

In 1861, he returned to New York to visit his father, and on his way back to Oregon was pressed into service by the United States Army to assist Captain William Murray Maynadier in escorting emigrants to Oregon over the Oregon Trail. Crawford returned to the east in 1862 and received a commission from President Abraham Lincoln of captain. Assigned as an assistant quartermaster, he organized a 100-man unit under orders to protect emigrants over the Great Plains. Upon completion of the task that year, the unit disbanded in October at Walla Walla in the Washington Territory. Crawford did this one final time in 1863.

Crawford resigned from the Army after the last escort and received appointment by the President as collector of internal revenue for Oregon. He served in that office from 1864 until 1869. President Ulysses S. Grant appointed him as Portland’s appraiser of merchandise in 1871, where he remained until 1876.

== Political career ==
In early 1843, Crawford attended the Champoeg Meetings that were held to determine if Euro-American settlers wanted to form a government. On May 2, 1843, a vote was held creating the Provisional Government of Oregon, with Crawford voting for the creation of the government. In 1847, he was elected to the Provisional Legislature to represent the Clackamas District. He returned for the next session, held from 1848 to 1849, the final session of the Provisional Government.

The United States created the Oregon Territory in 1848, displacing the Provisional Government. In 1859, Oregon became the 33rd state of the Union. In 1860, Crawford was elected as a Republican to serve Yamhill County in the Oregon House of Representatives, his last elected office. While in the legislature he helped elect Edward Dickinson Baker to the United States Senate.

== Later years ==
Crawford retired to his farm near Dayton in 1876. His wife died on May 20, 1879, and he remarried the next year to Mrs. Eunice Burrows. In 1862, son Medorem, Jr. (1844–1921) received appointment to West Point where he graduated in 1867. He worked his way up to brigadier general in the army and is buried at Arlington National Cemetery. Medorem, Jr.'s son, Army Colonel Lawrence Carter Crawford (1880–1949) is also buried here. Medorem, Sr. was involved with the Oregon Pioneer Association in retirement, serving as the organizations president from 1878 through 1881. Medorem Crawford died at his home near Dayton on December 26, 1891, at the age of 72.
