= François Norbert Blanchet =

French Canadian-born missionary priest and prelate

His Excellency, the Right Reverend François Norbert Blanchet
- Archbishop of Oregon City
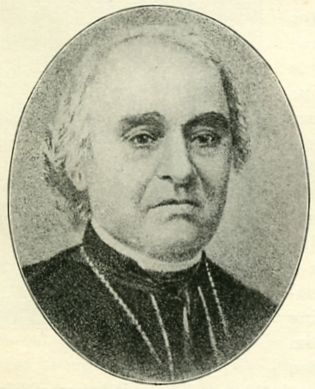
- Archbishop François Norbert Blanchet
- Archdiocese: Oregon City
- Installed: July 24, 1846
- Term ended: December 12, 1880
- Successor: Charles John Seghers
- Other post: Titular Archbishop of Amida
- Previous posts: Vicar Apostolic of the Oregon Territory, Apostolic Administrator of Walla Walla, Titular Bishop of Draso, Titular Bishop of Philadelphia in Arabia

Orders
- Ordination: July 18, 1819 by Joseph-Octave Plessis
- Consecration: July 25, 1845 by Ignace Bourget

Personal details
- Born: September 30, 1795 Saint-Pierre-de-la-Rivière-du-Sud, Lower Canada, British Empire (present-day Quebec)
- Died: June 18, 1883 (aged 87) Portland, Oregon
- Buried: St. Paul Catholic Cemetery; St. Paul, Oregon
- Parents: Pierre Blanchet
- Coat of arms

Ordination history of François Norbert Blanchet
History
Priestly ordination
- Ordained by: Joseph-Octave Plessis
- Date: July 18, 1819
- Place: Notre-Dame de Québec
Episcopal consecration
- Principal consecrator: Ignace Bourget
- Co-consecrators: Rémi Gaulin; Patrick Phelan
- Date: July 25, 1845
- Place: Montréal Cathedral
Episcopal succession
Bishops consecrated by François Norbert Blanchet as principal consecrator
- Modeste Demers: November 30, 1847
- Louis-Joseph d'Herbomez, O.M.I.: October 9, 1864
- Charles John Seghers: June 29, 1873
- Egidius Junger: October 28, 1879

François Norbert Blanchet (September 30, 1795 – June 18, 1883) was a French Canadian-born missionary priest and prelate of the Catholic Church who was instrumental in establishing the Catholic Church presence in the Pacific Northwest. He was one of the first Catholic priests to arrive in what was then known as the Oregon Country and subsequently became the first bishop and archbishop of the Archdiocese of Oregon City (now known as the Archdiocese of Portland in Oregon).

== Early life and priesthood ==
François Norbert Blanchet was born near Saint-Pierre-de-la-Rivière-du-Sud in Lower Canada (present-day Quebec). Along with his younger brother Augustin-Magloire Blanchet, he entered the Seminary of Quebec and was ordained a priest in 1819. Blanchet spent a year working at the cathedral in Quebec before being sent to do missionary work with the Micmac and Acadian people in present-day New Brunswick. To be able to preach to the local Irish, Blanchet became fluent in English. In 1827 he was summoned back to Montreal and became a pastor.

== Missionary work and episcopal career ==
In the 1830s, John McLoughlin sent letters from French Canadian Catholic employees of the Hudson's Bay Company requesting from Bishop Provencher of the Red River Colony to send priests to what was then known as the Oregon Country. Bishop Provencher originally suggested that priests be sent to the Willamette Valley but the Hudson's Bay Company pressed for the considered mission to be on the Cowlitz River, north of the Columbia River. Blanchet was appointed the Vicar General of the Oregon Country, with fellow priest Modeste Demers to aid in the missionary efforts. The missionaries were instructed by Archbishop Joseph Signay of Quebec: "In order to make yourselves sooner useful to the natives... you will apply yourselves... to the study of the Indian languages... so as to be able to publish a grammar after some of your residence there." The two priests along with nuns and lay people departed from Quebec on May 3, 1838, and traveled along the York Factory Express.

Arriving on 18 November at Fort Nez Percés, a Hudson's Bay Company fur trade outpost located in the present state of Washington, Blanchet celebrated Masses and baptized three Roman Catholic converts. In November of that year, they arrived at Fort Vancouver in present-day Vancouver, Washington. A delegation composed of French-Canadians from the Willamette Valley composed of Pierre Belleque, Joseph Gervais and Étienne Lucier were present to greet them. During their winter stay at the Fort, the priests held services in Chinook Jargon with Klickitats in attendance. Blanchet and Demers held Masses in various buildings within the fort, and Catholics often had to share worship space with Protestants, an arrangement that did not please either group.

Beginning on January 3, 1839, Blanchet, with Belleque and Lucier, went to the French Prairie farms maintained by the French-Canadians. The first Catholic Mass south of the Columbia river (in the Oregon Country) was celebrated at the St. Paul church on January 6, where Blanchet remained for five weeks. During his second visit in March 1839 to Cowlitz to visually explain basic Catholic religious concepts, Blanchet created the "Sahale stick" or stick from God in Chinook Jargon. This was later made more complex with the use of cloth, to allow for additional representations. The use of the Sahale stick was later adopted by Methodists and Presbyterians like Daniel Lee and Henry H. Spalding.

Blanchet was the first non-Native American to make an overnight stay on Whidbey Island in May 1840, where he offered Mass for several tribes at an outdoor altar; he had been invited by Chief Tslalakum. The chief presented him with a huge wooden cross (24 feet (7.3 m) long) and by 1841 the inhabitants were building a log church in the same area. Blanchet stayed on the island for nearly a year.

In February 1841 several gatherings were convened to determine the fate of recently deceased Ewing Young's estate, the first of the Champoeg Meetings which two years later saw formation of the Provisional Government of Oregon. Jason Lee as chairman of the first meeting on the 17th proposed that a Willamette Valley-based settler government be formed. Included in the considered government was the position of governor, which led Blanchet to counter propose a political system with a judge as the highest authority. During the subsequent meeting held at David Leslie's home near Champoeg on the next day Blanchet was selected to chair a committee to draft the laws of government. Blanchet was still opposed to the contemplated political structure, and six months later asked for a reprieve of his duties.

On December 1, 1843, the Vatican under Pope Gregory XVI established the Vicariate Apostolic of the Oregon Territory, and named Blanchet its vicar apostolic. With no bishops out west to consecrate him, Blanchet had to journey home to Quebec to be consecrated a bishop. He began his journey for Canada in December 1844, boarded a steamer on the Columbia River, touched at Honolulu, Hawaii doubled Cape Horn, landed at Dover, England, went by rail to Liverpool, took a vessel to Boston, Massachusetts, and finally proceeded by rail to Montréal, a journey of 22,000 miles (35,000 km). Blanchet was consecrated a bishop on July 25, 1845, by Archbishop Ignace Bourget at Mary, Queen of the World Cathedral in Montréal.

Then on July 24, 1846, the Vatican under Pope Pius IX divided the vicariate apostolic into three dioceses: Oregon City, Vancouver Island, and Walla Walla. Blanchet was named Bishop of Oregon City, while Demers was named Bishop of Vancouver Island and Augustin Blanchet Bishop of Walla Walla. The Diocese of Oregon City was elevated to an archdiocese on July 29, 1850, and François Blanchet was elevated to archbishop.

He retired in 1880; retaining the title of archbishop, he was named to a titular see, in the practice of that time. He died in 1883 and is interred at St. Paul Cemetery in St. Paul, Oregon.

François's brother was Augustin-Magloire Blanchet, who was the Bishop of Walla Walla until 1850 and then the Bishop of the Diocese of Nesqually, which later became the Diocese of Seattle.

== See also ==
- St. Paul Roman Catholic Church (St. Paul, Oregon)
- Pierre-Jean De Smet

Catholic Church titles
Preceded by position established	Archbishop of Oregon City; 1850–1880	Succeeded by Charles John Seghers
Preceded by position established	Bishop of Oregon City; 1846–1850	Succeeded by raised to Archbishopic
Preceded by position established	Vicar Apostolic of Oregon City; 1843–1846	Succeeded by raised to Bishopric
