= Albert E. Wilson =

American judge, pioneer, and merchant

Judge of the Provisional Government of Oregon
- In office Elected in 1843 never served
- Preceded by: Position created
- Succeeded by: Osborne Russell

Personal details
- Born: c. 1813 Massachusetts
- Died: March 28, 1861 (aged 47–48) Oregon City, Oregon
- Occupation: Pioneer, merchant

Albert E. Wilson (c. 1813 – March 28, 1861) was an American pioneer and merchant in Oregon Country. Raised in the United States, he moved to what would become the U.S. state of Oregon where he operated stores, was involved in politics, and was elected as the first judge of the Provisional Government of Oregon.

== Early life ==
Albert Wilson was born in Massachusetts around 1813. In 1842, he immigrated to the disputed Oregon Country aboard the ship Chenamus captained by John H. Couch. Upon arrival he opened a mercantile in Oregon City using goods he had brought with him from the East Coast. Wilson co-owned the store with George W. LeBreton.

== Political activities ==
In 1842, Wilson helped to found the Oregon Lyceum in Oregon City, and in 1843 was involved with the petition by Robert Shortess sent to the United States Congress in an attempt to invalidate land claims held by the Hudson's Bay Company and Dr. John McLoughlin. The land claims were along the Willamette Falls at Oregon City where McLoughlin claimed ownership over the islands at the falls, a prime location to utilize water power for mills. George Abernethy helped to draft the petition, but Wilson was charged with copying the document so Abernathy's name would not be attached to it for political reasons. Only Wilson and Shortess would sign the petition. Though this petition was ineffective, later efforts by Samuel Thurston in 1850 did remove legal title of the disputed lands from McLoughlin.

Later in 1843 Wilson was a participant of the series of Champoeg Meetings. At these meetings the settlers decided to create a Provisional Government, with a determinative vote on May 2, 1843. Wilson voted for the creation of the government, which passed 52–50., and he was elected as supreme judge with probate powers at an election held on July 5. He was to replace Ira L. Babcock who had been selected in 1841 before a government was created, however Wilson declined to serve.

== Later years ==
By 1845 he owned a blockhouse along the Columbia River a few miles from Fort Astoria. In 1846, Wilson opened a store near Astoria, Oregon, thus was one of the founders of that town, and was the first American merchant at that settlement. In 1847, he sold his property on the eastside of the Willamette River near Johnson Creek to Henderson Luelling. Wilson only had squatter's rights to the land, but Luelling later obtained legal tile through the Donation Land Act. The next year Wilson partnered with David McLoughlin and started stores in Portland, Oregon City, and Champoeg under the name of Pettygrove and Company. He was also involved with the timber industry along the lower stretches of the Columbia River before his death on March 28, 1861. Albert E. Wilson was buried in Oregon City.
