= François X. Matthieu =

American politician

François Xavier Matthieu
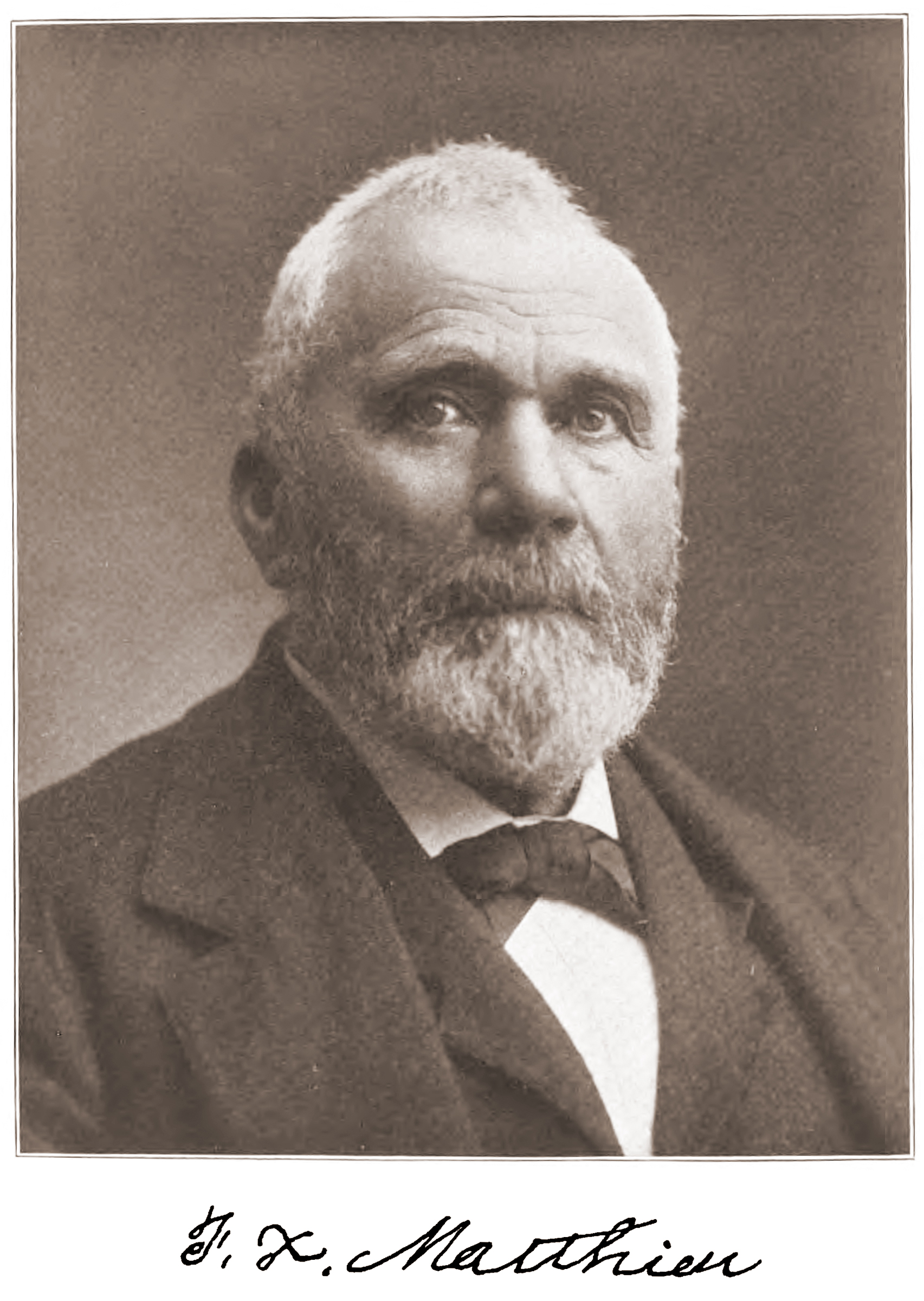
- F.X. Matthieu, circa 1900

Member of the Oregon House of Representatives
- In office 1874–1875
- Constituency: Marion County

Member of the Oregon House of Representatives
- In office 1878–1879
- Constituency: Marion County

Personal details
- Born: April 2, 1818 (United Kingdom) Terrebonne, Quebec, British Empire
- Died: February 4, 1914 (aged 95) Butteville, Oregon, United States of America
- Party: Democratic
- Spouse: Rosalie Aussant
- Parent(s): François Matthieu, Louise Daufin
- Occupation: merchant, politician

François "Francis" Xavier Matthieu (April 2, 1818 – February 4, 1914) was a French Canadian pioneer settler of the Oregon Country. He was educated in American values by a radical schoolteacher. Matthieu became involved in the 1837–1838 armed rebellion against British rule in Canada, for which he was forced to flee his native Quebec for safety in the United States, where he worked as a carpenter and a fur trader.

Matthieu was among those who attended the Champoeg Meetings of May 1843, which voted to establish a Provisional Government of Oregon with a view to eventually joining the United States. He gained lasting fame for being one of two individuals who broke a 51–51 tie, tipping the result in favor of the United States against British rule.

Matthieu was the founder of the small community of Butteville, Oregon, formed the first Masonic lodge in Oregon in 1855, and was elected the first President of the reorganized Oregon Pioneer Association in 1873. He additionally twice served in the Oregon legislature, gaining election for two-year terms in November 1874 and 1878.

In his 90s, Matthieu returned to the public eye as an icon of Oregon's pioneer history, not only for his pivotal vote in 1843 but as the last surviving participant of the 102 men who attended the 1843 Champoeg Meetings.

== Biography ==
=== Early life ===
François Xavier Matthieu was born on April 2, 1818, in Terrebonne, Quebec, Canada, to François and Louise Matthieu (née Daufin). Both of his parents were French, with his mother's family originating in Brittany and his father's in Normandy. Both parents ancestors were early immigrants to Canada, where they established themselves as independent farmers.

Matthieu was educated by a schoolmaster named Velade, who was a great admirer of the American Revolution, instilling in Matthieu and his other pupils an appreciation for the values of this popular revolt against monarchy. Velade's school provocatively held class elections every term, with some boys going so far as to display American flags.

As Terrebonne was located only about 12 miles (19 km) outside of Montreal and Matthieu made his way to that city at a young age, working as a clerk for a mercantile firm.

In 1835 Matthieu became involved with the Société des Fils de la Liberté (Society of the Sons of Liberty), a paramilitary organization which waged an uprising remembered to history as Papineau's Rebellion against British rule. The youth was engaged making musket shot and cartridges and transporting arms to the scene of the fighting. The group's armed struggle was regarded as treasonous by the British government, who executed captured participants by hanging. Matthieu's participation was discovered and the youth was forced to flee Canada for refuge in the United States, crossing the border there by means of a forged passport.

Upon arrival in the United States, Matthieu worked for a time as a carpenter in Albany, New York. He moved to Chicago in 1839 and then to St. Louis. It was in the latter city that Matthieu met Jean Pierre Chouteau, a representative of the American Fur Company. Chouteau hired Matthieu as a frontier clerk in charge of trappers and traders working among Native American tribes in the Midwest.

Matthieu subsequently spent three years in the fur trade on the Platte River and its tributaries. He would ultimately leave for Oregon as a result of disaffection with the company's policy of supplying alcohol to the Native American population — sales which would sometimes lead to catastrophic drunken situations from which multiple murders would result.

=== Champoeg participant ===
Matthieu came to the Oregon Country with the Elijah White party September 25, 1842, spending his first winter with fellow pioneer Étienne Lucier and discussing politics and government. In Oregon he once again returned to practice the carpenter's trade.

On May 2, 1843, a meeting of the settlers in the region was held on French Prairie at Champoeg, and a decision was to be made as to whether the pioneers would form a government to rule over themselves. Some 102 people were present — a majority of the European population of the Oregon Territory at that time. These were initially evenly divided, 51-51, over the question.

As tension over the standoff mounted, Matthieu was one of two individuals to break ranks with backers of British rule, voting instead for formation of an independent Provisional Government of Oregon. Matthieu's vote therefore proved decisive, and he would be celebrated in his twilight years as the man "whose vote saved Oregon" for the United States.

This melodramatic crossing over of two voters, recalled for decades in popular lore, was more akin to creation myth than political reality. In actuality, the boundaries of American and British control in the Pacific Northwest were determined through international diplomacy, culminating with the Oregon Treaty of 1846, the results of which had nothing to do with popular voting of residents or the existence or non-existence of a provisional territorial government.

=== Oregon pioneer ===
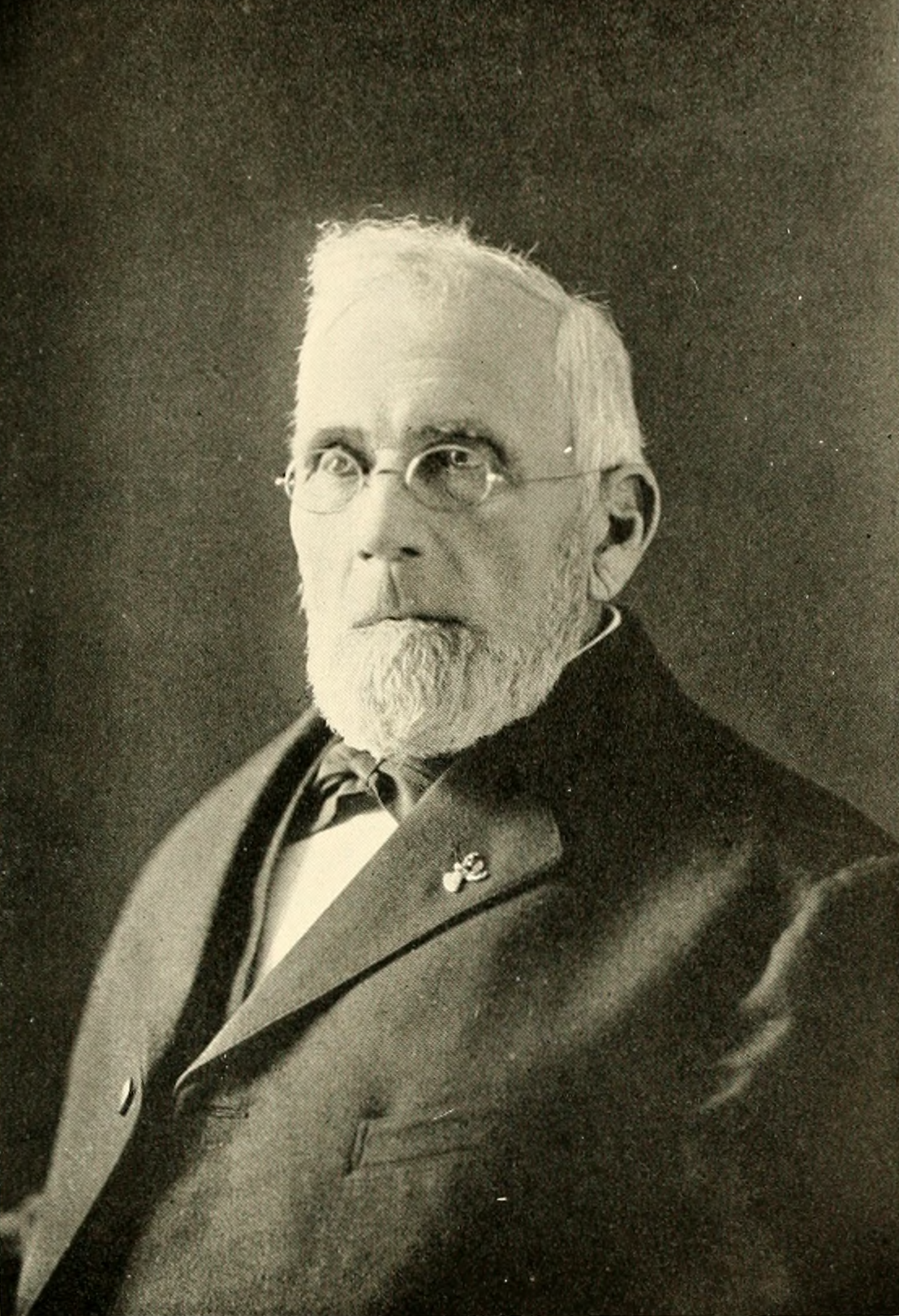
Mathieu as he appeared during his final years.

Matthieu settled on French Prairie and owned a general merchandising business in Butteville, a small town which he founded located in rural Marion County. On April 12, 1844, he married Rosalie Aussant, and the couple would have 15 children. In 1846 Matthieu filed a provisional land claim on 640 acres nearby, later refiling as a Donation Land Claim in 1850. Butteville post office was established in 1850 with the name of Champoeg, and with Matthieu as the first postmaster.

During the California Gold Rush Matthieu attempted to make his fortune transporting provisions and mercantile goods to the mines. Matthieu unfortunately fell ill on the way and wound up losing all 14 mules and the goods they were packing during his sickness, thereby dealing him a heavy financial blow. He also schemed on making use of Native Americans as mineworkers, but scurvy and diarrhea led to massive deaths among the first party accompanying him to California and the plan fell to nothing.

In 1873 Matthieu was elected the first president of the newly reorganized Oregon Pioneer Association. He would remain a stalwart member of that organization, attending virtually every one of the group's annual meetings up to the time of his death. He was also a Mason from 1855, helping to organize the first Masonic lodge in Oregon.

=== Political career ===
In 1874, he was elected as a Democrat to the Oregon House of Representatives to represent Marion County. Matthieu returned to the legislature in 1878, again representing Marion County.

=== Death and legacy ===
In his later years, Matthieu made his home in Portland in a house located at 351 NE Eugene Street on the city's East side.

Matthieu died on February 4, 1914, at a daughter's home in Butteville. He was the longest-surviving member of the 102 participants at the 1843 Champoeg Meetings.
