= Wallace House (fur-trade post) =

The Wallace House, Wallace Post or Calapooya Fort, was a fur trading station located in the French Prairie of the Willamette Valley. Opened by the Pacific Fur Company (PFC) in 1812, it was an important source of beaver pelts and venison. The possibility of either the Royal Navy or North West Company (NWC) competitors attacking Fort Astoria during the War of 1812, motivated the PFC management to sell its assets to the NWC in late 1813. Wallace House was utilized by the NWC until 1814, when they abandoned it in favour of the nearby Willamette Trading Post. The station is now located in Keizer, Oregon.

== Background ==
Starting with the arrival of the Tonquin and foundation of Fort Astoria in March 1811, the American Pacific Fur Company (PFC) gradually established a commercial presence along the Columbia River. The primary product sought by the company for sale in the Qing Empire were the fur pelts of the North American beaver. After the initial work was finished on Fort Astoria, additional trade posts were ordered to be established throughout the Pacific Northwest. At the time, the Willamette Valley had a sizable population of beaver, making it a suitable location for a secondary station.

== Establishment ==
On November 23, 1812, William Wallace and John C. Halsley led fourteen men from Fort Astoria to the valley to find a suitable area for a trading post. The party wintered there after completed the building, trapping beaver, hunting game and trading with the resident Kalapuyan nations.

A fellow band of PFC employees under Donald Mackenzie came from the interior back to Fort Astoria during the winter. The returned trappers proved to be taxing on Astoria's small food supplies so some of the men were ordered to the Wallace House. Alfred Seton led the designated men there, calling the location a "great prairie" with large populations of Elk, Columbian white-tailed deer and Black-tailed deer in nearby areas. Halsley, Wallace and their men returned to Fort Astoria on May 25, 1813 with a sizable supply of venison, a critical food supply that was sorely needed. More commercially important, however, was an inventory of 775 beaver furs captured over the previous winter.

== North West Company ==
The War of 1812 led to the complete isolation of the Pacific Fur Company. Their commercial rivals, the North West Company (NWC), based at their New Caledonian posts such as Fort St. James in the interior of modern British Columbia. To avoid conflict against the Royal Navy, the company officers agreed to sell its assets to the North West Company in 1813.

Throughout 1813 and 1814, trappers who operated out of Wallace House included Thomas McKay, Étienne Lucier, Alexander Ross and Donald McKenzie. A new establishment nearby, the Willamette Trading Post, gradually replaced the Wallace House in importance. Three Americans stationed at the latter location relocated to Wallace House for the majority of January 1814. Despite only having six traps, the men were able to gather 80 beaver skins.

The post was abandoned, with no record of it until 1832, when Nathaniel Jarvis Wyeth depicted it on a map of the Willamette Valley. In the early 1840s, the Methodist Mission in Oregon began work on the Oregon Institute in vicinity of where Wallace House was located.

== Bibliography ==
- Barry, J. Neilson (1941). "Site of Wallace House, 1812–1814 One Mile from Salem". Oregon Historical Quarterly. 42 (3). Portland, OR: Oregon Historical Society: 205–207. ISSN 0030-4727. JSTOR 20611445.
- Franchère, Gabriel (1854). Narrative of a voyage to the Northwest Coast of America in the years 1811, 1812, 1813, and 1814 or, The first American settlement of the Pacific. Translated by Huntington, J. V. New York, New York: Redfield – via Internet Archive.
- Henry, Alexander; Thompson, David (1897). Coues, Elliot (ed.). New Light on the Early History of the Greater Northwest: The Manuscript Journals of Alexander Henry, Fur Trader of the Northwest Company, and of David Thompson, Official Geographer and Explorer of the Same Company, 1799–1814; Exploration and Adventure among the Indians on the Red, Saskatchewan, Missouri, and Columbia Rivers. Vol. 2. New York, New York: Francis P. Harper.
- Watson, Bruce M. (2010). Lives Lived West of the Divide: A Biographical Dictionary of Fur Traders Working West of the Rockies, 1793–1858. Okanagan, BC: The Centre for Social, Spatial and Economic Justice of the University of British Columbia.
