= William Cannon (pioneer) =

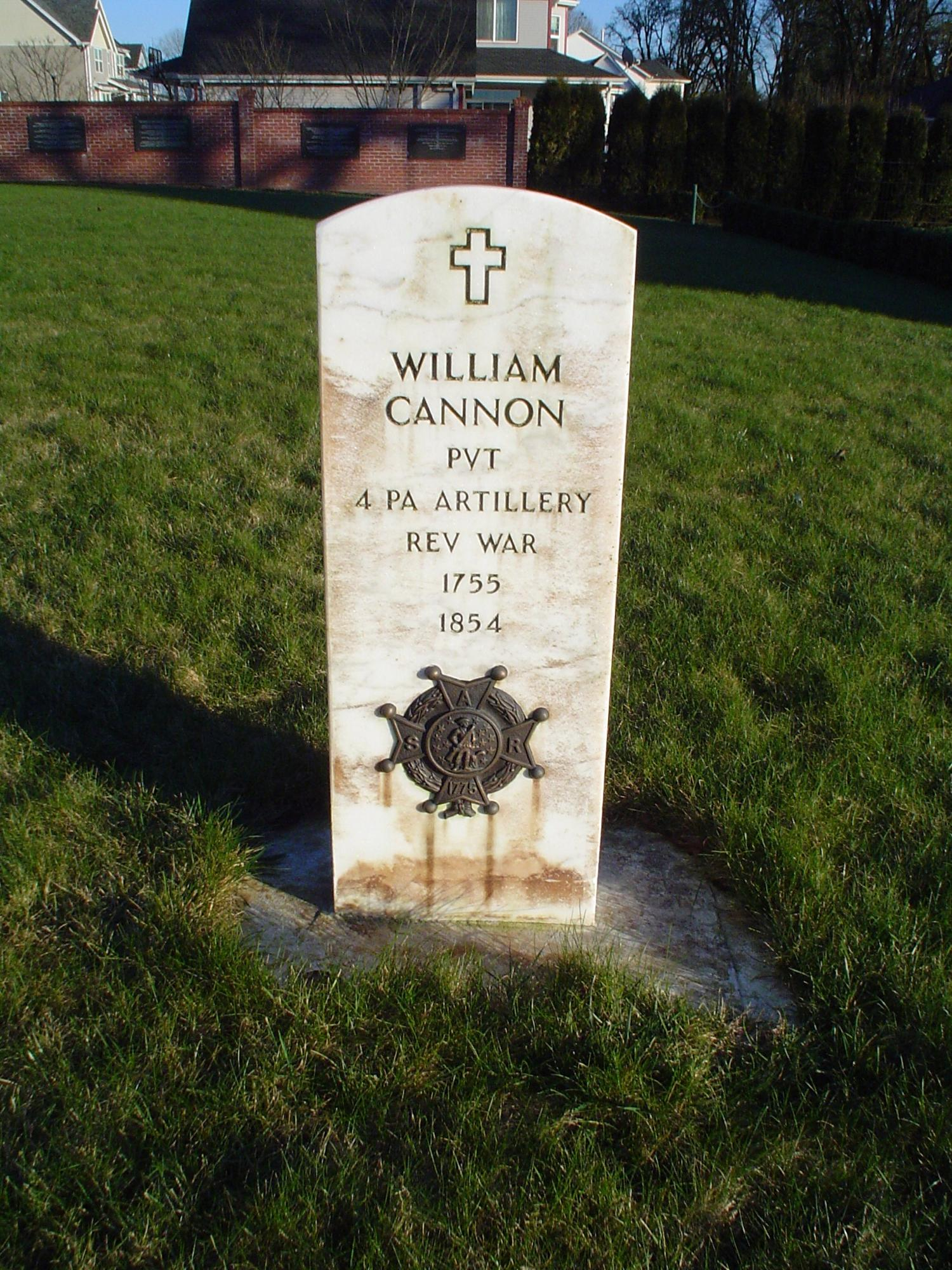
- Born: 1755 - 1763; Pennsylvania or Virginia
- Died: 1854 (aged 98–99); Oregon Territory near St. Paul
- Resting place: Old St. Paul's Cemetery; 45.212517°N 122.975394°W
- Occupations: Hunter carpenter, millwright
- Years active: 1812 – 1854
- Organization: Hudson's Bay Company
- Spouse: Polly Chelsamas
- Children: John Baptist Cannon

William Cannon (aka Canning) (1755 or 1763 – 1854) was among the first pioneers in the Oregon Country and the only known American Revolutionary War soldier buried in Oregon. He came to Oregon with the John Jacob Astor overland expedition under Wilson Price Hunt and arrived at Fort Astoria in 1812. In 1843, Cannon voted with the majority in favor of a provisional government.

== Vitals ==
William Cannon's tombstone in the old St. Paul, Oregon, cemetery shows he was born in 1755. This was based on his 1854 burial record in the St. Paul Roman Catholic Church register.

However, the Hudson's Bay Company biographical sheet for Willian Canning, indicates he was born in 1763.

No marriage record can be found for him in Harriet Duncan Munnick's Catholic Church Records of the Pacific Northwest (Vancouver) and (St. Paul). A baptismal record for a son, John Baptist Cannon, son of William Cannon and Polly Chelsamas, is found in Reverend Herbert Beaver's Fort Vancouver register.

William Cannon was enumerated in the 1849 Champoeg District Apportionment Census. His household consisted of one male under the age of 21 and two females. The under 21 male could have been his son who would have been around 15-years old. One of the females could have been Polly. The other female could be a daughter or Polly’s relative.

Cannon's obituary was published in Salem, Oregon Territory's The Oregon Statesman newspaper on September 5, 1854.

"Died on the French Prairie, in this county, near mission of St. Paul, at the residence of Casimer Guardipie, on the 29th ultimo. Mr. Wm. Canning, a native of Virginia, age 99. He came to the Willamette Valley in 1811; previous to that time he was in the rocky mountains, and on his return to the States he met Hunt's party, on their way to the Columbia. He was resided in the territory since 1811, much esteemed by all who knew him."

The item about Cannon's residence prior to the Hunt expedition, "previous to that time he was in the rocky mountains, and on his return to the States he met Hunt's party, on their way to the Columbia," has not been researched.

== Military service ==
Cannon told people that he served in the American Revolutionary War at the Battle of Kings Mountain and at the Battle of Cowpens. The 4th PA Artillery is inscribed on Cannon's tombstone. It can not be proven Pennsylvania soldiers were at Cowpens or Kings Mountain, and research is continuing for his service record.

In 1843, Cannon was present at the Lyceum Debating Society in Oregon City. George Abernathy, later to be elected Oregon’s governor, spoke on the need of the settlers to establish a government with the United States. The following extract is from a 1926 article by Glenn N. Ranck in the Oregonian newspaper.

"Pointing to William Cannon, the sole survivor present of those who had served in that sanguinary struggle, the strident orator called upon the aged soldier-patriot to arise. With trembling limbs, the feeble veteran of King's Mountain and Cowpens once more stood up in behalf of liberty, his wrinkled features radiantly alight with an old soldier's ecstasy."

== Overland Expedition to Astoria ==
John Jacob Astor commissioned an overland expedition to the Oregon Country in order to establish a Pacific Fur Company trading post at Fort Astoria. Cannon was recruited as a hunter by Wilson Price Hunt at Mackinac Island in August 1810." In Washington Irving's 1836 book, Astoria, Cannon's unpleasant experience with a grizzly bear is described. The party reached Astoria in 1812.

The Headquarters Log of the Pacific Fur Company is found in the book, Annals of Astoria, The Headquarters Log of the Pacific Fur Company on the Columbia River, 1811–1813. Cannon is named as Canan or Cannan. He worked as a hunter, carpenter, stone mason, and blacksmith. Carpenters and blacksmiths were categorized as mechanics. When Cannon wasn't named specifically, it can be assumed his work was included in the comments like "Mechanics at their respective Occupations", or "Mechanics employed as usual".

When the War of 1812 began, there was concern that the British might seize American assets, including the Pacific Fur Company at Fort Astoria. John George McTavish of the Northwest Company made an offer that the NWC purchase the Pacific Fur Company’s holdings. In October 1813, Fort Astoria was sold to the NWC and renamed Fort George. Many of the Pacific Fur Company workers stayed on as employees of the NWC. Cannon was one of these people. The Astoria log noted his new position.

"Weather the same as yesterday [cloudy with rain]. Wind S. E. John Day, Carson, Cann, Baker, Martial & Flangan left this for the Wolamut, having received their discharge and made arrangements with the N. W. Co. to trap till Spring up that river."

== Willamette River ==
The Willamette Post on the Willamette River, was created by the Pacific Fur Company for trappers to take pelts that would then be transferred to Fort Astoria (later Fort George). The post was transferred to the NWC. William Henry, NWC clerk in charge of the Willamette Post, mentions Cannon several times in his 1814 Journal.

On Sunday, March 20, 1814, John Day, Alexander Carson, and William Cannon arrived at Fort George from Willamette Post . The packs were examined on March 28th, and accounts were settled. Cannon stayed on at Fort George.

== Hudson's Bay Company (HBC) ==
In 1821, the NWC merged into the Hudson’s Bay Company, and Cannon went to work as a HBC employee. His previously cited HBC biographical sheet itemizes his work for that company.

- 1824–1826 Millwright Columbia [Cannon built a gristmill at Ft. Vancouver.]
- 1826–1827 Freeman Columbia
- 1827–1837 Millwright Fort Vancouver .
- 1837–1839 Millwright Willamette Columbia
- 1839–1845 Freeman / Settler Willamette Valley Columbia
- In 1836–1837, he was listed as age 73 with 22 years of service.

In 1836, Alexander Carson, former Hunt Expedition member, was killed by Indians. He had previously written a will in 1829, giving his property to Cannon. After he died, Cannon obtained Carson’s balance due on the Hudson’s Bay Company accounts.

== A son ==
John Baptist Cannon was baptized on September 17, 1837, by Rev. Herbert Beaver, an Anglican minister stationed at Fort Vancouver, Washington.

His parents were named as William Cannon, a settler on the River Willamette where the baptism was conducted, and Polly Chelsamas.

The name Chelsamas is not a known Oregon Indian tribe or Washington Indian tribe. William may have pronounced the tribal name correctly, but Rev. Beaver may not have been able to understand the name. While ages were not given in the register, Anglicans believe in infant baptism. John's birth may have been close to his baptism.

== Life on the River Willamette ==
In 1841, Lt. Charles Wilkes, U.S.N., was on an exploring expedition for the U.S. government when he visited the prairie. William Cannon was named in Wilke's visit with William Johnson. The following paragraphs are extracted from Wilke's journal.

"June 1841

"It was raining quite hard when we passed Camp Maude du Sable, a sandy point just at the opening out of the Willamette Valley, which was one of the points originally occupied when the river was first explored by the whites. About two miles further up the river is Champooing, eighteen miles above the falls, which we reached at about 4 p.m. Here we found a few log houses, one of which belonged to a Mr. Johnson, who gave us a hearty welcome. Mr. Johnson was formerly a trapper in the Hudson Bay Company’s service, but has begun to farm here. He invited us to take up our quarters with him, and although they were not very pleasant in appearance, we thought it better to accept the invitation than to pitch our tents on the wet ground in the rain.

"Finding, after the excitement of war was over, he could not be content to lead a quiet life, he determined to adopt the business of trapping. In this he was engaged until the last few years, when he had settled himself down here, and taken an Indian girl for his wife, by whom he had several children. . . His Indian wife is extremely useful in making everything, besides taking care of the household concerns, and is rather pretty. Johnson's estimate of her was that she was worth 'half a dozen civilized wives'.

"There are four houses and three lodges in sight of Johnson’s farm, whence all the neighbours called to see us. They were just the sort of men one would expect to see in such a place. One was an old man by the name of Cannon, [bold added] who had been one of the party with Lewis and Clarke, and was from his own account the only remaining one in the country. He likes the country, and says he thinks there is no necessity for Dr. M'Laughlin's authority or laws to govern it."

== Provisional government ==
In 1843 Cannon was among the immigrants who voted in favor of forming a provisional government in the Oregon Country.

Cannon died on August 29 1854, and was buried in St. Paul, Oregon.
