= Michel Laframboise =

French Canadian fur trader (1793–1865)

- Born: Jean Baptiste Eugene Laframboise; May 11, 1793; Varennes, Quebec, Canada
- Died: January 25, 1865 (aged 71); Champoeg, Oregon, U.S.
- Occupations: Fur trapper, farmer
- Spouse: Émilie Picard

Michel Laframboise (May 11, 1793 – January 25, 1865) was a French Canadian fur trader in the Oregon Country who settled on the French Prairie in the modern U.S. state of Oregon. A native of Varennes, Quebec, he worked for the Pacific Fur Company, the North West Company, and the Hudson's Bay Company before he later became a farmer and ferry operator. In 1843 he participated in the Champoeg Meetings. Though he voted against the measure to form a provisional government, the measure passed and led to the creation of the Provisional Government of Oregon.

== Early life ==
Jean Baptiste Eugene Laframboise was born on May 11, 1793, in Varennes, Quebec, Canada, along the Saint Lawrence River. His parents were Michel Laframboise and Josèphe Monjau, with Jean Baptiste later adopting his father's first name. He was hired by John Jacob Astor's Pacific Fur Company in 1810 and sailed from New York City aboard the Tonquin.

== Fur trader ==
Laframboise and the rest of the crew and passengers arrived at the mouth of the Columbia River in 1811 where they established Fort Astoria. He had been hired as a voyageur, but with the sale of the post to the North West Company (NWC) he became an interpreter for that company in 1813. In 1821, the NWC was merged into the Hudson's Bay Company (HBC) and he stayed on as an interpreter and as a postmaster in their Columbia District.

During his employment with the HBC, Laframboise participated and often led many expeditions through the southern Oregon Country to Mexican-owned Alta California. He served as interpreter for Alexander Roderick McLeod in a party that visited the Umpqua River Valley and then California. Laframboise was on site to aid the establishment of Fort Umpqua along with McLeod. During successive years' expeditions he led often went to French Camp near modern Stockton, California.

While working for the HBC out of Fort Vancouver, he received permission to settle some land on the French Prairie in 1831. However, Laframboise stayed with the company and helped restore the health of Hall J. Kelley when he arrived at the fort in 1834 with Ewing Young. Young's party had been attacked on their way through Southern Oregon in the Rogue River Valley by the Rogue River Indians. These Native Americans were retaliating against whites after an expedition led by Laframboise killed eleven Natives earlier that year. This series of killings lasted for decades and eventually led to the Rogue River Wars in the 1850s. Meanwhile, Laframboise continued to lead expeditions south, occasionally independent of the HBC.

== French Prairie ==
On July 9, 1839, while working as a Hudson's Bay Company Clerk, he married Emilie Picard, daughter of Andre Picard and a deceased Okanagan woman.. The marriage was attended by James Douglas, Esquire, Chief Trader and commander at Fort Vancouver, John McLeod, Esquire, Chief Trader, G. T. Allan, Thomas McKay, Wm. Fraser Tolmei, and W. G. Rae.

The couple had several children before and after the marriage, settling on the French Prairie in the Willamette Valley of present-day Oregon . In 1841, he worked as Charles Wilkes' guide in the Oregon Country when Wilkes was leading the United States Exploring Expedition.

In 1841, Eugene Duflot De Mofras, a French naturalist and explorer, made a list of the “Principal French-Canadian Settlers on the Willamette." Mich. Laframboise had settled on the Prairie in 1837. He had 200 horses, two houses, and one mill. He had enclosed 40 Hectares and cultivated 20. He harvested 170 Hectolites of wheat.

Laframboise took part in the Champoeg Meetings in 1843 where he voted against forming a settler government. However, the majority of settlers voted in favor and established the Provisional Government of Oregon. By 1852 he had settled a Donation Land Claim north of his original property and was operating a ferry across the Willamette River to Champoeg, connecting to the Champoeg-Salem Road. He had a stroke in the early 1860s and then sold off his assets. Michel Laframboise died on January 25, 1865, at the age of 71.
