= Organic Laws of Oregon =

Legislation governing the Provisional Government of Oregon

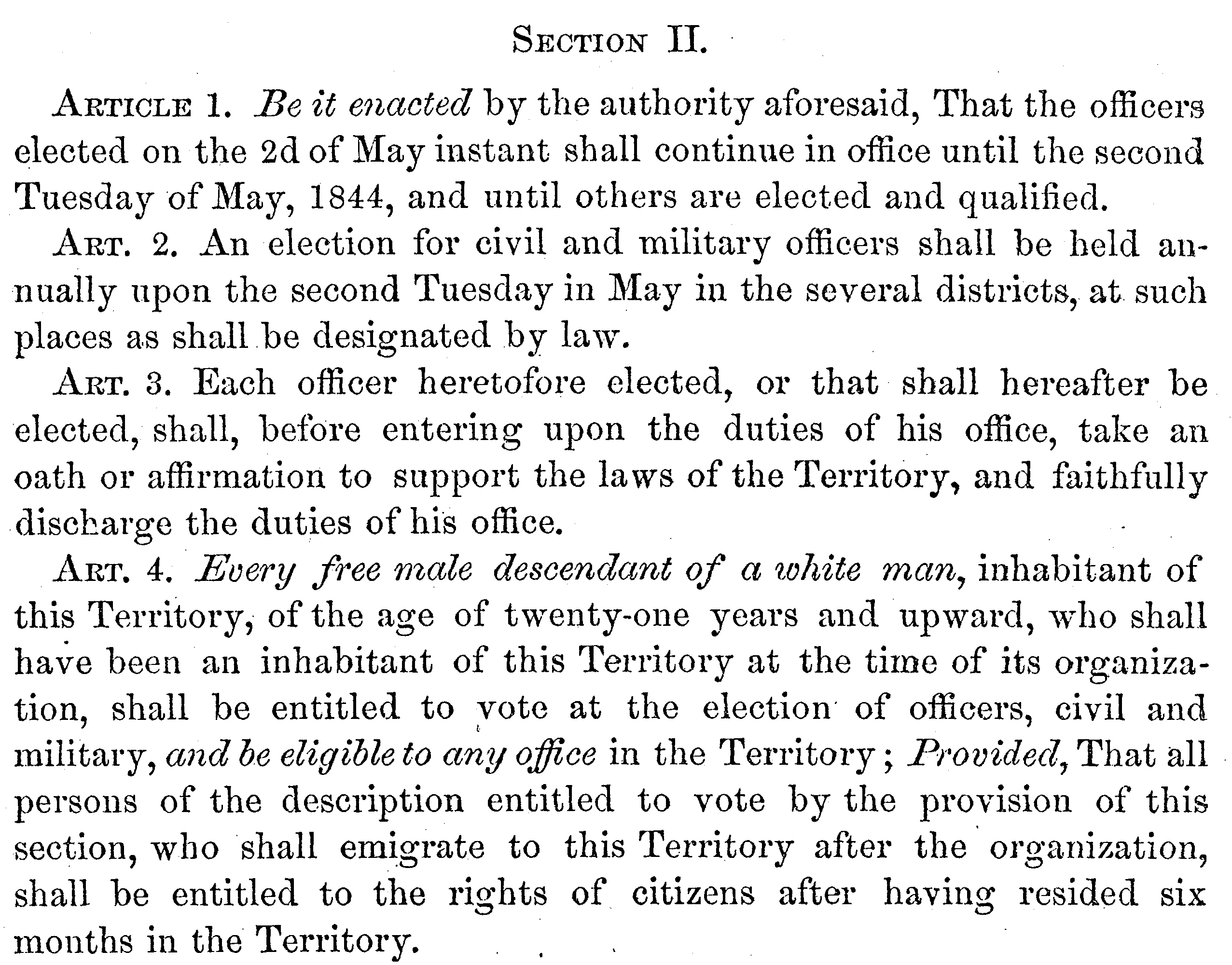
- Section II of the Organic Laws
- Created: 1843
- Ratified: July 5, 1843
- Location: Oregon Country
- Author(s): Legislative Committee
- Purpose: Framework for the Provisional Government of Oregon

The Organic Laws of Oregon were two sets of legislation passed in the 1840s by a group of primarily American settlers based in the Willamette Valley. These laws were drafted after the Champoeg Meetings and created the structure of a government in the Oregon Country. At the last Champoeg Meeting in May 1843, the majority voted to create what became the Provisional Government of Oregon. Laws were drafted by the committee and accepted by a popular vote in July. These laws were reformed by a second version in 1845.

The Organic Laws were based on the laws of Iowa Territory and compartmentalized the government into three branches consisting of an executive branch, a legislative branch, and a judiciary. Once the Oregon Territory was formed in 1848, the territorial government took control of the laws and invalidated only one provision of the Organic Laws. On February 14, 1859, Oregon became a state and the Oregon Constitution became the legal framework for the state.

== Background ==
In 1841 a series of meetings were held at Champoeg on French Prairie in the Willamette Valley. The first meetings were held in part as a response to the death of Ewing Young who had died without a will. In February 1841 a probate judge was appointed along with a few other positions, but no further movement towards a government occurred.

On February 2, 1843, a new series of meetings began with a gathering at the Oregon Institute in what is now Salem to discuss problems with predatory animals attacking livestock. An assembly with Americans and French-Canadian men, numbering less than 150, was held at Champoeg on 2 May 1843. Measures presented to form a government were tabled, though no record exists of the subsequent voting. The first vote held rejected the presented report due to the inclusion of a governor. A succession of votes were then held for each individual article put forth. William H. Gray states that the tally was 52 in favor of the measures and 50 against them. Another witness, Robert Newell, agrees that 50 men were against the formation, but 55 voted the legislation. According to Newell, the five tie breakers were all French-Canadians, while Gray's account labels the two tie breakers as Americans. Regardless of exact figures of those supporting the presented laws, these votes are held to have created the Provisional Government of Oregon.

== First Organic Laws ==
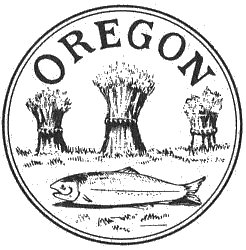
Seal of the Provisional Government

With the formation of the Provisional Government, a committee of nine individuals were elected to frame the laws of the government. This Legislative Committee consisted of David Hill, Robert Shortess, Alanson Beers, William H. Gray, James A. O'Neil, Robert Newell, Thomas J. Hubbard, William Dougherty, and Robert Moore who was elected as the chairman of the committee. Each member was to be paid $1.25 per day for their services with the first meeting held May 15, 1843. On July 4 a new gathering began at Champoeg with speeches for and against the proposals of the committee. Then on July 5, 1843 the Organic Laws of Oregon are adopted by popular vote after being recommended by the Legislative Committee, with the laws modeled after Iowa’s Organic Law and the Ordinance of 1787, creating the de facto first Oregon constitution. Scholars and historians have appraised the First Organic Laws as being "very crude and unsatisfactory", not allowing for an effective government body to function.

In the preamble this "temporary government" was intended to exist "until such time as the United States of America extend their jurisdiction over us." The articles of the first Section were from the 14th section of the Northwest Ordinance, with minor modifications. The first three articles were identical to the Ordinance, outside of a change related to relations with Indigenous peoples. Wars against the natives were to be commenced by "representatives of the people" instead of the Congress. The fourth and final article was from the sixth article of the Ordinance, banning slavery outside use as a punishment. The portion of the sixth article related to restitution of runaways to slave states was not included in the Organic Laws.

Section II had eighteen articles, dealing mainly with the structure of the Provisional Government. Articles 1 through 4 covered the elections of officers, with suffrage restricted to "every free male descendant of a white man", therefore allowing participation by interested French-Canadians or their Métis children. Articles 5 through 7 created the three bodies of government, the three member Executive Committee, the Legislative Committee and a Judiciary. Articles 8 through 11 establish and define the offices of Recorder (later the Secretary of State) and Treasurer and 12 through 15 outlined what laws of Iowa were adopted. Article 16 regulated the Supreme Court sessions with two sessions held annually. Article 17 detailed the system of marriage, with parental consent required for participants under 21, women having to be at least 14 years old and men 16. It cost $1 to marry and 50¢ to record the marriage.

The laws also divided the region into four districts, called for a subscription of settlers to pay for the government, and named the region Oregon Territory. Lastly a militia was authorised to consist of one battalion with control of the military under the Executive Committee.

=== Land claims ===
The Organic Laws authorised a maximum of 640 acres (2.6 km^{2}) to be claimed by male pioneers. This size was from legislation created by American Senator Linn in 1842, allowing "any white male" to take as much land in the Oregon Country. Rejected in 1843, it was the basis for the later Donation Land Claim Act.

The Provisional Government allowed one land patent per male settler, and required "permanent improvements" within six months of recording the claim. The original fourth article allowed six times as much land for "missions of a religious character" per claim, or 3,840 acres (15.5 km^{2}). Intertwined with this legislation was an ongoing dispute between Methodist missionary Alvin Waller and Chief Factor John McLoughlin of the British Columbia District over rights to Willamette Falls. The fourth article was controversial with American immigrants who arrived in 1843 and 1844, upset at how much land missionaries could occupy, and was subsequently repealed in 1844.

== Second Organic Laws ==
The American immigrants who arrived in 1843 and 1844 were unsatisfied with the laws. The second legislative committee, the majority of its members having arrived the previous year, ruled the laws were statutory and thus could be repealed or revoked at the discretion of the assembly. In an address sent from the Executive Committee to the Legislature in June 1844 it was recommended for "a more thorough organization" to be established. They advised the creation of an executive branch with only one governor. The legislature passed a bill that dissolved the Executive Committee, and announced an election for governor to be held on 3 June 1845.

Led by Jesse Applegate, the legislature of 1845 was elected in May. The actions of the previous assembly were held to be illegal as "the people had not yet resigned the law-making power." Applegate supported minimal modifications of the first Organic Laws, which including most of the laws passed in 1844. The modified laws were held to need the approval of the citizens to enact the changes. On July 26, 1845 a public vote passed the amended Organic Laws of Oregon. One change was that the Legislative Committee was replaced by a House of Representatives; initially with 13 members and permitted to have up to 61 legislators. The House had the authority to change the laws by vote, without a need to submit changes to a popular vote of the people.

== Aftermath ==
Upon the assumption of territorial power by Governor Joseph Lane in 1849, he approved the Organic Laws as the basis of law in the Oregon Territory. These laws would play a part in the determination of where the capital would be located. The Oregon Constitutional Convention in 1857 created a new Constitution that was passed by the people of Oregon on November 9, 1857, and became effective upon statehood on February 14, 1859, usurping the Organic Laws of Oregon.
