= Robert Moore (Oregon pioneer) =

American politician

Member of the Missouri House of Representatives
- In office 1830–1831
- Constituency: Ste. Genevieve, Missouri

Legislator in the Provisional Government of Oregon
- In office 1843–1843
- Preceded by: position created
- Majority: Chairman

Personal details
- Born: October 2, 1781 Pennsylvania, United States
- Died: September 2, 1857 (aged 75) Oregon
- Spouse: Jane Gilbert Tubbs Apperson
- Occupation: soldier, politician, ferry operator, newspaper publisher

Robert Moore (October 2, 1781 – September 2, 1857) was an American politician and pioneer in the Oregon Country. A Pennsylvania native and veteran of the War of 1812, he also participated in the early movements to form a government in Oregon Country and founded Linn City, Oregon. Before traveling to Oregon in 1840 he had served in the Missouri General Assembly.

== Early life ==
Robert Moore was born in Franklin County, Pennsylvania, on October 2, 1781. In 1805, Moore married Margaret Clark, and they would have ten children. In the east he served as a soldier in the War of 1812 before moving to the Midwest where he helped to found several towns and built several businesses. The Moores would move to Illinois where Robert left the family to immigrate to Oregon Country. Margaret would die in 1848 in Missouri.

== Oregon ==
Robert Moore traveled to Oregon over the Oregon Trail in 1839. He started out with the Farnham party from Peoria, Illinois, known as the Peoria Party. Moore joined the Shortess party briefly after the Peoria Party split at Bent’s Fort. He arrived in Oregon 1840 at Willamette Falls. Three of his ten children also immigrated west.

In 1840, after arriving, Moore began building Robin’s Nest across the river from Oregon City. He purchased the 1,000 acres (4.0 km^{2}) from a local Native American chief named Wanaxha. The town was later renamed Linn City in honor of Missouri Senator Lewis Linn who sponsored the Donation Land Claim Act. By 1845, Moore was also operating a ferry across the Willamette River to Oregon City.

== Politics ==
Moore’s political career began in Missouri where he was elected to the state house in 1830 to represent Ste. Genevieve County. In Oregon on February 18, 1841, Moore was selected to a constitutional committee by fellow pioneers in an early and failed attempt at forming a provisional government. Though a constitution was never adopted, Dr. Ira L. Babcock was selected to serve as a supreme judge with probate powers to deal with the estate of prominent pioneer Ewing Young, while Moore was chosen as a justice of the peace.

Then at the July 5, 1843, Champoeg Meeting Moore participated and voted in favor of forming a provisional government. The proposal passed 52 to 50, leading to the creation of the Provisional Government. Robert Moore was selected for the legislative committee that same year to draft the Organic Laws of Oregon.

== Later years ==
In 1848, the region south of the 49th degree of latitude became the United States' Oregon Territory. In 1850, Robert Moore was appointed as territorial printer. From 1850 to 1851 Moore was the owner of the Oregon Spectator newspaper based out of Oregon City. Also in 1850, Moore became the postmaster for the community. He also advocated for the property rights of Dr. John McLoughlin, whose land holdings in Oregon City were denied in the Donation Land Act of 1850. Moore remarried in 1851 to Jane Gilbert Tubbs Apperson. In 1854, a fire destroyed much of Linn City, so the business district was relocated to the west and the city became West Linn. The rest of the city was destroyed by a fire in 1861 before flooding that December wiped out what remained. Robert Moore died on September 2, 1857, at the age of 75.
