= Champoeg Meetings =

Public meetings held in Oregon, 1841–1843

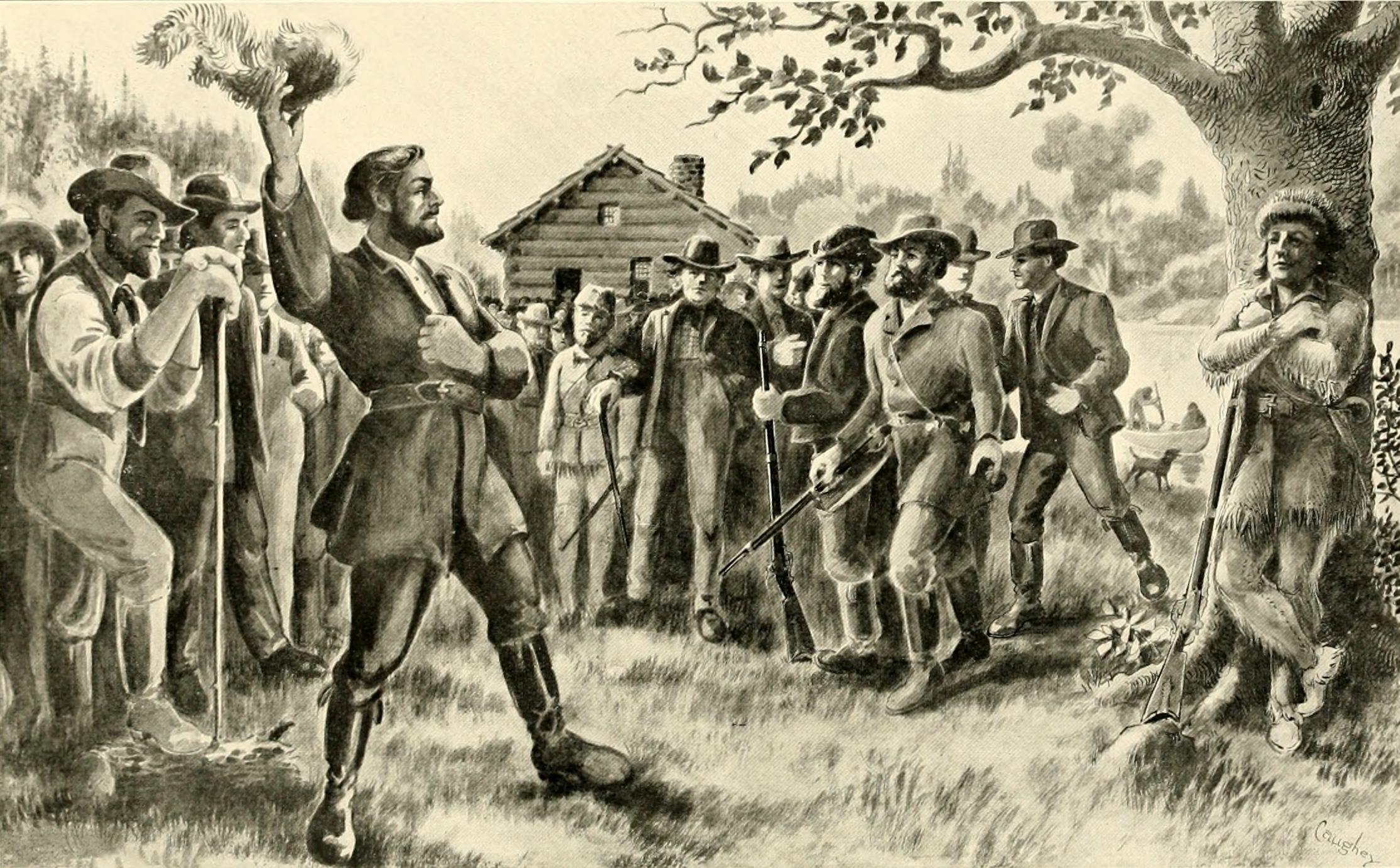
- Joseph Meek calling for the final vote
- Date: 1841–1843
- Location: Champoeg, Oregon Country, North America
- Also known as: Wolf Meetings
- Participants: European-American settlers of the Oregon Country
- Outcome: Provisional Government of Oregon established

The Champoeg Meetings were the first attempts at formal governance by European-American and French Canadian pioneers in the Oregon Country on the Pacific Northwest coast of North America. Between 1841 and 1843, a series of public councils was held at Champoeg, a settlement on the French Prairie of the Willamette River valley in present-day Marion County, Oregon, and at surrounding settlements. The meetings were organized by newly arrived settlers as well as Protestant missionaries from the Methodist Mission and Catholic Jesuit priests from Canada.

Since the first decade of the 19th century, a small but growing number of pioneers had settled in the Oregon Country, mostly to pursue business interests in the North American fur trade. Despite its economic value, the region was so vast and remote that it was left unorganized for several decades, with no European-American government in place to set laws and resolve disputes. Prior to the Champoeg Meetings, the closest thing to a government in the Oregon Country was the privately owned Hudson's Bay Company, which effected a loose authority mainly through the efforts of Dr. John McLoughlin at Fort Vancouver in present-day Vancouver, Washington.

Uncertainty about settling the estate of prominent settler Ewing Young in 1841 stirred a group of settlers led by missionary Jason Lee to advocate for a settler-run local government in the region. The assemblies at Champoeg addressed issues of probate law and estate administration, how to reward hunters who killed animals preying on livestock, and how to compromise on a system of leadership for the proposed government. The meetings eventually culminated in a vote on May 2, 1843, which concluded in favor of forming what became the Provisional Government of Oregon. Though primarily supported by American pioneers and opposed by French Canadian settlers in anticipation of the region's annexation by the United States, several French Canadians also voted in favor of forming a provisional government. A state park and marker at the site of the May 2 vote commemorate the proceedings, as well as a large mural behind the desk of the Oregon Speaker of the House at the Oregon State Capitol in Salem.

== Background ==
The Oregon Country was an enormous area of indeterminate boundaries on the Pacific Northwest coast. By 1805, it was claimed simultaneously by the United States as well as by three colonial European powers: Russia, Great Britain and Spain. Interest by these nations was mostly stimulated by the prospect of obtaining enormous wealth from the area's rich natural resources, especially in the burgeoning fur trade. Several voyages were proposed to map the coast, with Alessandro Malaspina, Robert Gray, and George Vancouver arriving in the early 1790s. The overland treks of Alexander Mackenzie and Lewis and Clark which reached the Pacific coast in 1793 and 1805, respectively, continued to ferment interest by Europe and the United States. In 1818, the United States and Britain signed a treaty that called for the two countries to peaceably co-exist in the region, but not to exclude other claims. Through a series of other treaties the number of countries claiming the Oregon Country was eventually reduced to just two, the United States and Great Britain.

As such expeditions expanded Euro-American knowledge of the Pacific Northwest, the possibilities of exploiting the fur trade provoked several companies to attempt to establish a permanent presence there. The first to do so was the Montréal-based North West Company, which under David Thompson arrived in what is now Montana and created posts such as the Saleesh House to trade with the Salish and Kootenai tribes. The American Pacific Fur Company financed the next commercial push into the region, working primarily with Chinookan peoples at Fort Astoria at the mouth of the Columbia River. The War of 1812 ended the American venture and its operations were sold to its competitor, the North West Company, which was itself amalgamated into the Hudson's Bay Company in 1821. From Fort Vancouver, located near the confluence of the Willamette and Columbia Rivers, the operations of the Hudson's Bay Company grew and quickly became the primary commercial force in the Oregon Country. Despite the activities of American mountain men and upwards of 12 attempted companies, the commercial hegemony of the British company remained in force until after the formation of the Provisional Government.

Britain and the U.S. continued a tense "joint occupation" as economic activity in the region continued to expand. In the 1830s, missionaries, including Protestants such as Jason Lee, Henry H. Spalding, and Marcus Whitman and Catholics such as François Norbert Blanchet, Modeste Demers and Pierre-Jean De Smet, would also travel overland to the Oregon Country and establish missions among the Native Americans there. As time passed many of the trappers and missionaries settled the land and developed farms and timber and grist mills. Beginning in the 1840s, more and more settlers arrived via the Oregon Trail that the early missionaries and trappers had helped to blaze. Finally, enough Americans, Canadians and Europeans (mainly English and French) were living in the ungoverned land that a critical mass was reached and the settlers began to develop plans for a government.

== Meetings ==
=== Location ===
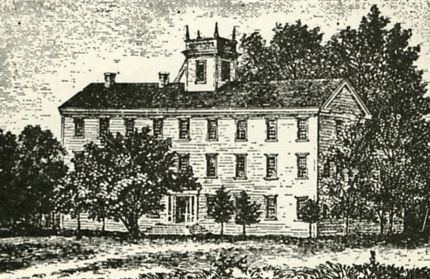
Oregon Institute building circa 1844 in present-day Salem

The plans called for meetings to be held at the French-Canadian enclave of Champoeg on the banks of the Willamette River. This part of the Willamette Valley was and still is known as the French Prairie, since its early settlers spoke French as their first language. Some of the meetings were also held at the Oregon Institute (the predecessor to Willamette University) further south of Champoeg in present-day Salem and downriver in Oregon City.

The name Champoeg has an unknown origin. Some theories are that it was a Native American name for its location along the Willamette River, originally Champooik. Other theories are that it is of French origin, or a French variation on the Native American term. The name was later used for one of the early districts of the Provisional Government of Oregon, part of which later became Marion County, Oregon.

=== 1841 ===
In 1841, the early settlers found themselves in need of a government after the death of pioneer Ewing Young. Young had accumulated much wealth as a successful rancher following the Willamette Cattle Company events of 1837 when he and a group of other settlers herded over 600 head of cattle from California to Oregon. This made him very wealthy and intertwined him economically with many of the other pioneers in the valley. Young had died without a will or an heir, thus necessitating the judgment of a probate court, because otherwise people were sure that Young's estate would be disposed for the Hudson's Bay Company, the Catholic Jesuit priests from Canada, or the Protestant Methodist Mission from the United States, which had happened in the past. The settlers decided to assemble at Champoeg, where they hoped to receive input from other prominent settlers and outline a plan of government for the region.

Several meetings occurred over the subsequent months, which were attended by François Norbert Blanchet, William J. Bailey, Mr. Charlevon, David Donpierre, Gustavus Hines, William Johnson, Jason Lee, Étienne Lucier, Robert Moore, Josiah Lamberson Parrish, Sidney Smith, and David Leslie. The first meeting was held on February 17, 1841, and chaired by Jason Lee, who suggested a set of measures that would establish a civil government. Amongst the measures was one which would have organized a single criminal justice system applicable to all Oregon pioneers not employed by the Hudson's Bay Company. The proposed positions included a governor, an attorney general, justices of the peace, road commissioners, and even two people to serve as overseers of the indigent. This initial proposal was rebuked by François Blanchet, who counter-proposed a looser system with the post of a judge, rather than a governor, as the highest position.

The second meeting, held the following day, was chaired by David Leslie. To mollify French-Canadian discontent over a potential governorship, Dr. Ira Babcock, a physician from the Methodist Mission, was elected as Supreme Judge, using the laws of New York State as his guide to probate any estates. However, the contemporary historian William H. Gray, in his book A History of Oregon, 1792-1849, explained that there would not have been any copy of the laws of New York available to the settlers and that instead Babcock acted "just as he pleased". In fact he led not only the judicial branch but also the legislative and executive branches. The only other estate that Babcock administered was that of Cornelius Rogers, previously a laborer of the ABCFM stations who died in February 1843. Other positions created and filled by the group included George LeBreton as Clerk of the Courts and Public Recorder; William Johnson as High Sheriff; William McCarty, Pierre Belleque, and Havier Laderant as constables; and Joseph Gervais, William Cannon, Robert Moore and Lewis H. Judson as justices of the peace. Additionally, a constitutional committee of seven, consisting of three Americans and four French-Canadians and chaired by Blanchet, was established to discuss further measures.

During the next meeting, commenced on June 1, 1841, Blanchet reported the constitutional committee had not met and requested a reprieve from his duties. William J. Bailey was appointed as the new chairman, and the committee was advised to consult with Commodore Charles Wilkes of the U.S. government and Dr. John McLoughlin of the Hudson's Bay Company concerning forming a government. The group decided on subsequent meetings to be held on August 1 and on October 5. Meeting with five men, Wilkes judged their motivation based on getting "settlers to flock in, there by raising the value of their farms and stock"; consequently he advised the group to wait for the United States to project rule over them. McLoughlin was equally unsupportive of the considered organization. These reactions discouraged the constitutional committee from ever meeting, nor were the planned general meetings convened. Despite falling short of the original goals set by Lee, these early meetings still helped to create "an organized community" in the Willamette Valley.

=== 1842 ===
In Oregon City at the Oregon Lyceum, pioneers debated the aspects of forming a temporary government with the expectation of eventually being annexed by the United States, or forming an independent country. Those favoring an independent nation were led by Lansford Hastings, then employed by Dr. McLoughlin, while George Abernethy led those opposed to a new country. Ultimately those favoring waiting for the United States to take ownership of the region won out in the debates. Hastings noted that if the United States hadn't "extended her jurisdiction" within in a few years many "were favorable to declaring themselves independent... of all powers of the world." On September 22, 1842, Dr. Elijah White organized and spoke at a meeting at Champoeg. His purpose was to inform the settlers that he had been commissioned by the United States War Department as a sub-Indian agent. Additionally, he implied that the pioneers could select him as a magistrate for the region. However, White was not popular among the settlers and this led to additional discussions about forming a government.

=== 1843 ===
On February 1, 1843, residents of the Willamette Valley met at the Oregon Institute in present-day Salem, Oregon, to discuss at the so-called "First Wolf Meeting" the issue of predatory animals attacking livestock. The only fact known from the First Wolf Meeting is that Supreme Judge Babcock was elected chairman and appointed a committee of six in preparation for the "Second Wolf Meeting", which met on March 6 at the house of French-Canadian Joseph Gervais. The total population of non-indigenous people in the valley was under 500 during this time, but the addition of about 1,000 Americans later in 1843 bolstered the pioneer presence. It was not until the Second Wolf Meeting that a system of bounties for wolves, cougars and bears was created. As one participant, William H. Gray, put it, the purpose of the discussions was to "get an object before the people upon which all could unite" to ensure settler "self-preservation, both for property and person". Bounties were to be paid by orders on the accounts of Fort Vancouver, the Island Milling Company or the Methodist Mission. The gathering set in motion the organizing of a provisional government, with the post of governor agreed upon. Notably, indigenous people were to get half the pay of pioneers for bounties. The last organizational meeting was held on May 2, 1843, in Champoeg, where Babcock was elected president again and, aware of the great friction on that issue, he called for a vote on whether to create a provisional government.

==== Voting record ====
There were two votes on May 2, neither of which was recorded at the actual event. The report presented by the committee is known to have included the position of Governor, which was rejected immediately by French Canadians after being read. The meeting was then divided over adopting "the report of the committee and an organization". According to the only surviving contemporary record, taken by George LeBreton, a "great majority of those present" voted to form a government.

The first count of the division appeared by Gray in an article of the Astoria Marine Gazette in 1866 as 52 "Americans" for and 50 "French-Canadian and Hudson's Bay men" against considering a government, and was later published in his 1870 book A History of Oregon. Additionally, Gray claimed that the French Canadians were "drilled" by Vicar General Blanchet to vote no, despite the two tiebreakers in Gray's version being the Catholics Étienne Lucier and François X. Matthieu. Gray's book has been stated to be rife with "acrimonious partisanship and disregard of truth"; contemporaries including Blanchet, Jesse Applegate, Robert Newell, Peter Hardeman Burnett, and George Abernethy, among others, criticized portions of it. Newell stated the vote was 55–50, with three additional French Canadians supporting the motion. He also noted that the "First vote taken was that we have no Governor to defeat the wolf bummers." The official record states that after the first vote, the report was voted on "article by article" without the office of Governor appearing.

The list below was created several decades after the vote, and after many of the participants were deceased. No roll of participants is known to exist from the time of the actual meeting, and the only primary source from the time of the meeting states that "a great majority" passed the motion by acclamation.

Those alleged to have voted for the creation of the provisional government:

Pleasant M. Armstrong
Ira Babcock (president)
Dr. William J. Bailey
Alanson Beers
Pierre Belleque
J.C. Bridges
Hugh Burns
Charles Campo
William Cannon
Harvey L. Clark
Medorem Crawford
Amos Cook
Allen J. Davie
David Donpierre
William M. Doughty
George W. Ebbert
Francis Fletcher
George Gay
Joseph Gale
Joseph Gervais
William H. Gray
John Smith Griffin
Webley John Hauxhurst
David Hill
Joseph Holman
John Howard
Gustavus Hines
Thomas J. Hubbard
William Johnson
Lewis H. Judson
George W. Le Breton
David Leslie
Reuben Lewis
Étienne Lucier
François X. Matthieu
Joseph Meek
William McCarty
Charles McKay
Robert Moore
John L. Morrison
Robert Newell
James A. O'Neil
Xavier Laderout
Josiah Lamberson Parrish
John Edmunds Pickernell
James R. Robb
Osborne Russell
Robert Shortess
Alvin T. Smith
Sidney Smith
Solomon H. Smith
Calvin Tibbetts
David Weston
Caleb Wilkins
Albert E. Wilson
William H. Willson

Those slandered as voting against the creation of the provisional government despite a lack of contemporary records (Hussey's list was originally compiled by François X. Matthieu from his store ledger and provided to George Himes, who first publicized the two lists):

Alexis Aubichon
Jean B. Aubichon
Louis Ausant
Cyfois Bargeau
Pascal Biscornais
Louis Boivers
Antoine Bonenfant
Alexis Briscbois
Oliver Briscbois
Joseph Brunelle
Andre Chalifoux
Adolph Chamberlain
Joseph Cornoyer
Joseph Delard
Pierre Depot
Joseph Despart
Andre Dubois
Jean B. Ducharme
Antoine Felice
Louis Forcier
Luc Gagnon
Pierre Gauthier
Jean Gingras
Étienne Gregoire
Andre La Chapelle
Louis La Bonte
Michel Laframboise
Jean B. Lalcoure
Augustin Lambert
Alexis La Prate
Andre Longtain
Moyse Lore
Joseph Matte
Fabien Maloin
David Mongrain
Pierre Pepin dit LaChance
Pierre Pariseau
Augustin Remon
Thomas Roi
Charles Rondeau
Andre Sanders
Gideon Senecalle
Jacques Servant
Louis B. Van Dalle

After this vote, the people elected members for a legislative committee to draft a working government. The members selected were David Hill, Robert Shortess, Robert Newell, Alanson Beers, Thomas J. Hubbard, William H. Gray, Robert Moore, James A. O'Neil, and William M. Doughty. Other offices elected on May 2 were Albert E. Wilson as Supreme Judge, George W. LeBreton as Court Clerk and Recorder, Joseph L. Meek as Sheriff and William H. Willson as Treasurer.

=== Organic Laws ===
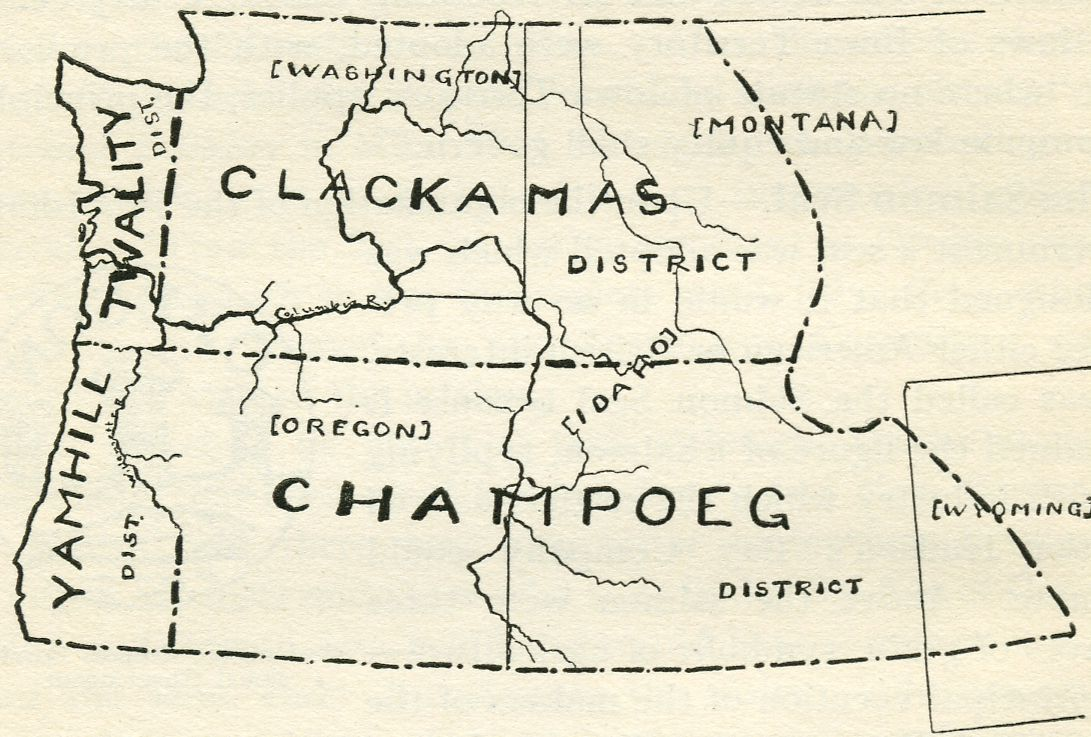
District boundaries drawn in 1843, showing modern U.S. state and international borders

A gathering was held on July 5 to vote on the work of the legislative committee. The original Organic Laws of Oregon were modeled after the Ordinance of 1787 and Iowa's Organic Law, laying out the framework of a political structure modeled on the United States, with three branches of government. The government was created, as its preamble declared, "until such time as the United States of America extend their jurisdiction over us." This document was recognized as the de facto first Oregon constitution. The election for the first Executive Committee was held with Joseph Gale, David Hill, and Alanson Beers elected as the committee members to serve in place of a Governor. The entire territory was then divided into four administrative districts: Yam Hill (also Yamhill), Clackamas (also Klackamas), Tuality (also Twality, and later Washington County), and Champoick (also Champoeg). The districts were generally divided according to watersheds such as the Willamette and Pudding Rivers. The northern border of the jurisdiction was not initially clearly delineated due to the ongoing Oregon boundary dispute and to the fact that there no willing participants in the government north of the Columbia River.

== Subsequent history ==
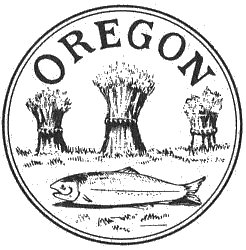
Seal of the Provisional Government of Oregon

The Provisional Government of Oregon originally hardly functioned due to various limitations upon its power, but after the adoption of the second Organic Code in 1845, its control over the Willamette Valley was solidified. It eventually established taxes, built roads, authorized ferries, passed laws, and even waged war against some Native American tribes in the Cayuse War following the Whitman Massacre. Oregon's pioneers considered this government framework that was installed by the adopted Organic Laws of Oregon to be their first constitution, although in 1844 the legislative committee specifically ruled the organic laws statutory rather than constitutional. Negotiations with the Hudson's Bay Company in 1845 expanded the provisional government's jurisdiction north of the Columbia River, its officers continuing to run the majority of the civil affairs in the newly created Vancouver district. In 1846, the boundary dispute with Great Britain was settled, which reduced the area claimed by the provisional government to that territory south of the 49th degree of latitude. A new territorial government was formed after 1848 when Oregon was organized as an official United States territory. The presidentially appointed governor of the Oregon Territory, Joseph Lane, arrived March 3, 1849, and he officially ended the provisional government by declaring that U.S. laws and government were in effect over the territory. Oregon later entered the Union as the 33rd U.S. state, on February 14, 1859.

== See also ==
- List of governors of Oregon
- William Gilpin
- Thomas J. Farnham
