= Elijah White =

United States Indian agent and missionary

- Born: 1806; New York
- Died: April 3, 1879 (aged 72–73)
- Occupations: Missionary physician
- Known for: Oregon Trail
- Title: United States sub-Indian Agent

Dr. Elijah White (1806–1879) was a missionary and agent for the United States government in Oregon Country during the mid-19th century. A medical doctor from New York State, he first traveled to Oregon as part of the Methodist Mission in the Willamette Valley. He returned to the region after a falling-out with mission leader Jason Lee as the leader of one of the first large wagon trains across the Oregon Trail and as a sub-Indian agent of the federal government. In Oregon he used his authority to regulate affairs between the Natives and settlers, and even between settlers. White left the region in 1845 as a messenger for the Provisional Government of Oregon to the United States Congress, returning in 1850 before leaving again for California in the early 1860s.

== Early life ==
White was born in New York, in 1806. There he received his education, including medical training at a school of medicine in Syracuse, New York. Prior to 1836 he married, and the couple had a son named Jason as well as adopting another son named George. In 1836, White accepted an appointment to join Jason Lee in Oregon Country at the Methodist Church’s mission. White and his family sailed to the Sandwich Islands aboard the vessel Hamilton, arriving in July 1836. Others on the ship bound for the mission included William H. Wilson, Alanson Beers, and Miss Anna Maria Pittman who became Lee's first wife. On the islands both White and his wife taught to the Native Islanders until May 1837 when they continued on to Oregon.

== Oregon ==
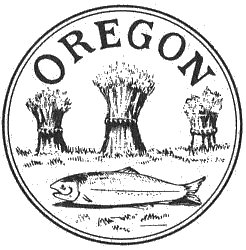
Seal of the Provisional Government

After arriving the family took up residence at the Methodist Mission along the Willamette River at Mission Bottom. His infant son Jason drowned in 1838 after a canoe his wife and David Leslie were traveling in flipped over on the Columbia River. His other son also drowned that year while trying to ford the Willamette River. Elijah White and Jason Lee developed animosity towards each other and differences in opinion on the direction of the mission leading to White leaving in 1841 to return to the East.

In 1842, White led the first wagon train over the Oregon Trail that had more than 100 people. Trapper and later politician Osborne Russell served as guide to this migration. The party set out on May 16, 1842, from Elm Grove, Missouri, with 112 people, 18 wagons, and a variety of livestock. Along the journey, some in the migration grew wary of White’s leadership and L. B. Hastings was selected as leader for a time until the party split into two groups. François X. Matthieu along with several other Canadians joined the party along the way to Oregon. White arrived at Fort Vancouver ahead of the main party, arriving on September 20, 1842.

White also returned as an official agent of the United States Government, after appointment as sub-Indian agent. Also in 1842 in his official capacity he brokered a code of conduct for the Nez Perce tribe as well as placating tensions with the Walla Walla and Cayuse tribes near the Whitman Mission in the eastern section of the region. In Oregon he served as teacher to William J. Bailey, training Bailey as a doctor. On September 22, 1842, White organized a meeting at Champoeg where he informed the settlers that he had been commissioned by the United States War Department as a sub-Indian Agent and implied that the pioneers could select him as their leader. He appointed judges to deal with disputes between Native Americans and United States citizens, and even between citizens.

In 1843, White was selected as one of twelve members of the second Wolf Meeting to determine if the settlers wanted to form a government while waiting for the Oregon Question to be resolved. He was not involved in the final meetings, but in May 1843 the settlers voted 52 to 50 in favor of creating the Provisional Government of Oregon.

The following year White was involved with the Cockstock Incident when the provisional government’s recorder George LeBreton was killed by a Molala by the name of Cockstock. He had tried to capture Cockstock prior to the bloodshed, and then worked to resolve tensions between the settlers and Native Americans after Cockstock and two settlers were killed.

White then discovered a pass through the Oregon Coast Range to what is now Newport, Oregon in 1845 before leaving the region with a petition from the Provisional Government to the United States Congress that same year. According to historian Frances Fuller Victor, White, through his exploration and advocacy for a southern cutoff to the Willamette Valley, may have been primarily responsible for the disastrous Meek Cutoff party of 1845.

== Later life ==
Elijah White returned to what had become the Oregon Territory in 1850 to promote the community of Pacific City, Washington along the Columbia River. Located near what is now Ilwaco, he partnered with James Duval Holman to sell property to settlers. White received a second commission as an Indian agent in 1861 for the region west of the Rocky Mountains and moved to California. Doctor Elijah White died on April 3, 1879, at the age of 73.
