= Pierre Belleque =

French Canadian fur trader (1797–1849)

Pierre Belleque (born Pierre Bélêc)
- Born: 5 January 1797; L'Assomption, Québec
- Died: 1849 (aged 51–52) at sea
- Occupations: trapper, farmer
- Spouse: Geneviève St-Martin

Pierre Belleque or Pierre Billique (5 February 1797 – 1849) was a French Canadian fur trader in the British-claimed Columbia District, which was also known as the Oregon Country and also claimed by the United States. He settled on the French Prairie in what is now the state of Oregon where in 1843 he participated in the Champoeg Meetings. Pierre was elected one of three Constables. He voted affirmative for the measure to form a provisional government at the May 2, 1843 meeting. That measure passed and led to the creation of the Provisional Government of Oregon.

== Origins ==
He was born in the parish of L'Assomption-de-la-Sainte-Vierge in Charlevoix county in the province of Québec. He was born 5 January 1797, and baptized the following day by the parish priest, Father Dominique (born Jean-Baptiste Prémoulx) at the parish church, Saint-Pierre-du-Portage. His baptism can be seen on any genealogy site which carries the parish records of Québec. His father, a farmer, was Louis Bélêc and his mother, Marguerite Baudouin (Beaudoin). He was the tenth of eleven children, and the youngest of the four siblings known to have survived beyond two years of age.

== Fur trade ==
In 1818, Belleque signed up with the British North West Company, and became an employee of the Hudson's Bay Company (HBC) in 1821 when the two companies were forced to merge. Around 1830, he claimed some land on the French Prairie in the Willamette Valley.

== Oregon ==
Around 1833, Belleque settled his farm, which lay next to Étienne Lucier, a fellow former French Canadian fur trapper for the HBC. There Belleque and his wife, Genevieve St. Martin, lived at the Willamette Fur Post near Champoeg. That post had been owned by the HBC, and the Belleque family was able to live there after receiving permission due to Genevieve's relation to one of the HBC officers. (Genevieve was the daughter of a French Canadian father and a Chinook mother. The couple would have seven children).

On March 22, 1836, he and 15 other French Canadians on the prairie representing nearly 80 settlers and their children signed a petition to Norbert Provencher, the Bishop of Juliopolis, requesting a priest for the settlement. At that time of this petition, Belleque had three children. In 1843, at Champoeg, Belleque participated in the debates over whether the settlers in the region should establish their own government, or wait until the Oregon boundary dispute was settled. At the final vote on May 2, 1843, Some of the French Canadian pioneers voted against forming a government. However, the measure passed by a vote of 52 to 50 at the Champoeg Meetings, and a provisional government was created.

The Marker at Champoeg shows 53 names. "The inscription frankly admits that the names were listed only 'as far as obtainable' at the time and since Hines himself published later revised lists as more information became available to him. For many years the OHS printed programs for the Champoeg commemorative observances. These contained the revised lists of voters, with the notation, 'This list is subject to revision from time to time as errors may be discovered.'" [Hines did not attend the meeting and was known to have been elsewhere on that day.] "Caleb Wilkins appears to have been in California at that time. One or two other names may be classed as 'doubtful' affirmative voters. On the other hand, there is evidence to show that several persons not included in the list actually voted with the majority. These were Xavier Ladaroute, Joseph Gervais, Pierre Belleque, Francis Bernier, and David Donpierre. And the name inscribed 'Russell Osborn' should be 'Osborn Russell.'"

Pierre Belleque would remain at his farm for 15 years, and then left for the California Gold Rush in 1848. Returning home by steamship in 1849 from San Francisco, he became quite ill from a fever contracted in the Gold Fields. He died before reaching home and was buried at sea near the mouth of the Columbia River in October 1849.
