= Butteville, Oregon =

Unincorporated community in the state of Oregon, United States

- Census-designated place
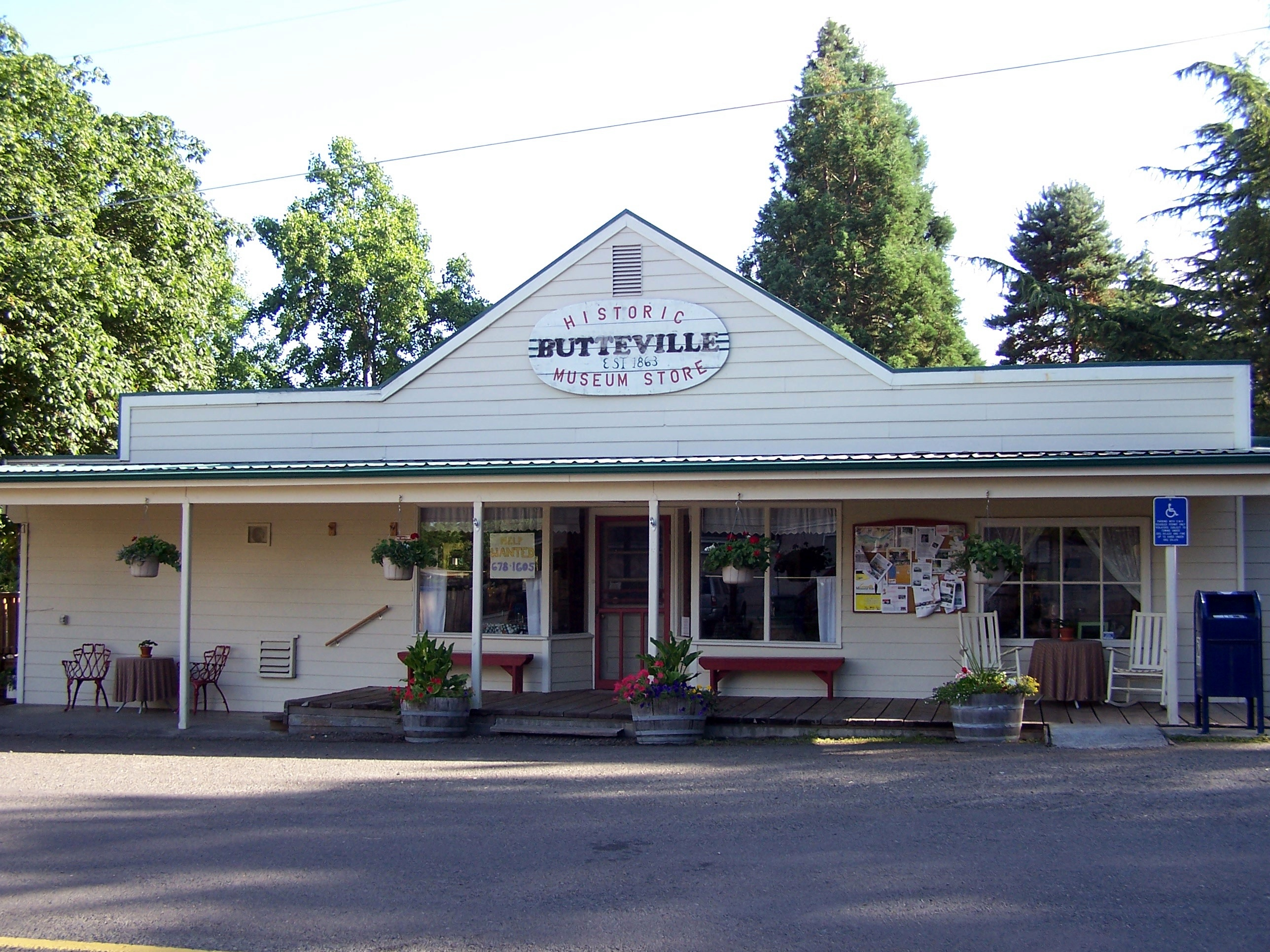
- The historic Butteville Store, established in 1863

- Location in Marion County and the state of Oregon
- Coordinates: 45°15′20″N 122°50′05″W
- Country: United States
- State: Oregon
- County: Marion

Area
  - Total: 1.12 sq mi (2.89 km^{2})
  - Land: 1.05 sq mi (2.72 km^{2})
  - Water: 0.066 sq mi (0.17 km^{2})
- Elevation: 197 ft (60 m)

Population (2020)
  - Total: 273
  - Density: 260.1/sq mi (100.43/km^{2})
- Time zone: UTC-8 (Pacific (PST))
  - Summer (DST): UTC-7 (PDT)
- ZIP Code: 97002 (Aurora)
- Area code: 503
- FIPS code: 41-10100
- GNIS feature ID: 2407931

Butteville is a census-designated place and unincorporated community in Marion County, Oregon, United States. As of the 2020 census the population was 273. It is part of the Salem Metropolitan Statistical Area.

== History ==
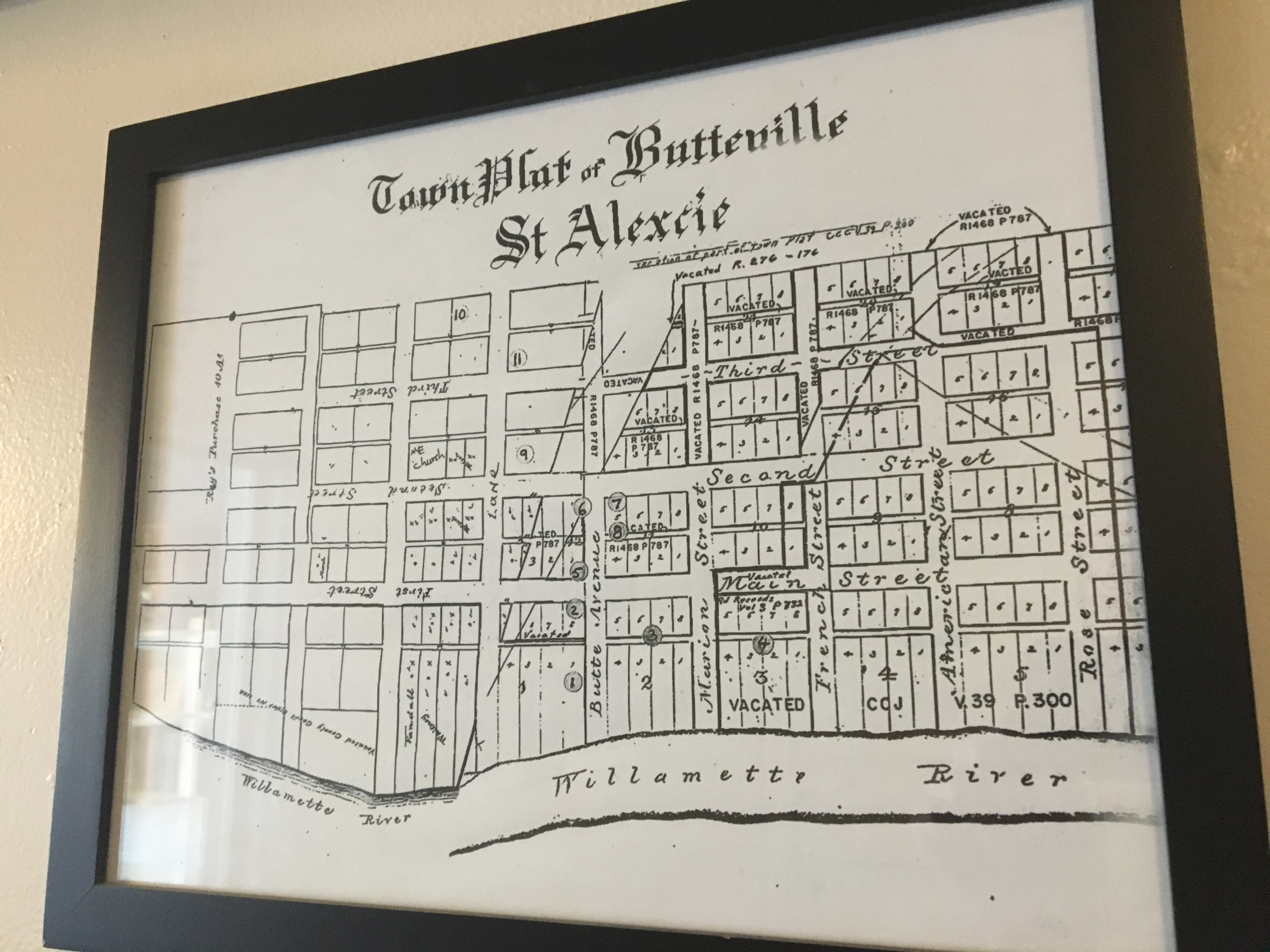
Town plat from survey by R. V. Short in 1859, currently on display inside the Butteville Store.

Butteville was founded in the 1840s by members of the Methodist Mission. Butteville was once served by steamboats running on the Willamette River. Butteville saw the peak of its economy in the 1850s, as it competed with neighboring Champoeg for shipping business from the surrounding French Prairie. Most of Butteville's early residents were French-Canadian.

== Geography ==
Butteville is in northern Marion County and is bordered to the northwest by the Willamette River, which forms the Clackamas County line. Aurora, the town which houses the post office that serves Butteville, is 6 miles (10 km) to the southeast. Salem, the state capital and Marion county seat, is 27 miles (43 km) to the south, and downtown Portland is 23 miles (37 km) to the north.

According to the U.S. Census Bureau, the Butteville CDP has a total area of 1.12 square miles (2.90 km^{2}), of which 1.05 square miles (2.72 km^{2}) are land and 0.07 square miles (0.18 km^{2}), or 5.92%, are water, within the Willamette River. La Butte rises to the southwest more than 300 feet (90 m) above the town and river.

== Demographics ==
Historical population
Census	Pop.	Note	%±
2000	293		—
2010	265		−9.6%
2020	273		3.0%
U.S. Decennial Census

As of the census of 2000, there were 293 people, 106 households, and 83 families residing in the CDP. The population density was 282 inhabitants per square mile (109/km^{2}). There were 113 housing units at an average density of 108.8 per square mile (42.0/km^{2}). The racial makeup of the CDP was 95.56% White, 2.05% Native American, 0.34% Asian, 1.71% from other races, and 0.34% from two or more races. Hispanic or Latino of any race were 2.73% of the population.

There were 106 households, out of which 33% had children under the age of 18 living with them, 74.5% were married couples living together, 4.7% had a female householder with no husband present, and 20.8% were non-families. 17.9% of all households were made up of individuals, and 9.4% had someone living alone who was 65 years of age or older. The average household size was 2.76 and the average family size was 3.18.

In the CDP, the population was spread out, with 28.7% under the age of 18, 4.1% from 18 to 24, 21.5% from 25 to 44, 34.1% from 45 to 64, and 11.6% who were 65 years of age or older. The median age was 42 years. For every 100 females, there were 98.0 males. For every 100 females age 18 and over, there were 99.0 males. The median income for a household in the CDP was $36,429, and the median income for a family was $65,625. Males had a median income of $71,875 versus $26,607 for females. The per capita income for the CDP was $31,258. About 9.7% of families and 12.4% of the population were below the poverty line, including none of those under the age of eighteen or sixty five or over.

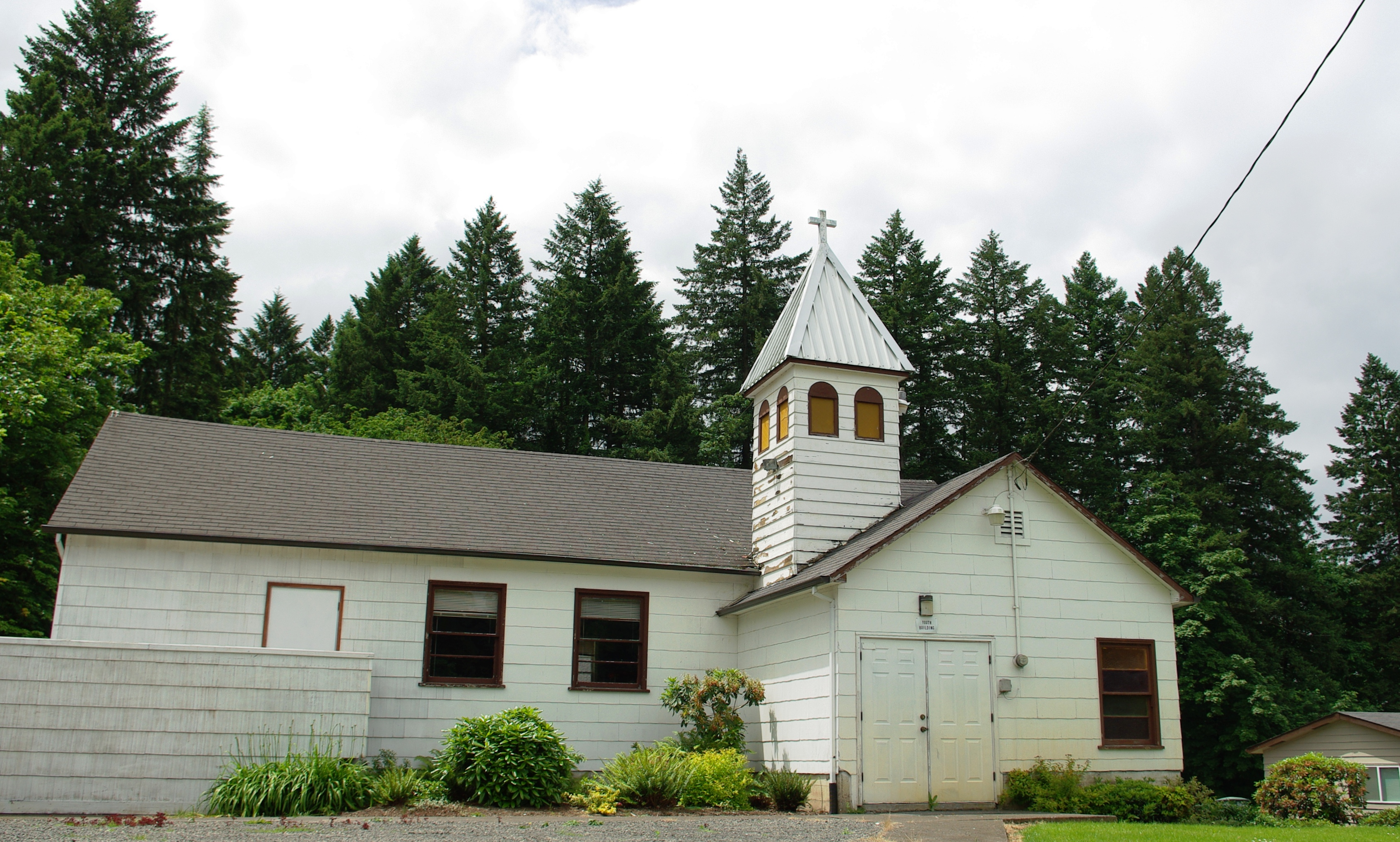
Church in Butteville

== See also ==
- François X. Matthieu
- List of ghost towns in Oregon
- Steamboats of the Willamette River
