= James A. O'Neil =

American pioneer

James A. O’Neil

Member of the Provisional Legislature of Oregon
- In office 1843–1843

Personal details
- Born: January 26, 1800 New York
- Died: September 1, 1874 (aged 74) Oregon
- Spouse: Tabitha C. Bowman

James A. O’Neil (January 26, 1800 – September 1, 1874) was an American businessman and politician in the Oregon Country and later Oregon Territory. A New York native, he took part in the Champoeg Meetings and helped form the Provisional Government of Oregon. Prior to the formation of a government he participated in the Willamette Cattle Company, and later served as a judge in the Provisional Government.

== Early life ==
James O’Neil was born in the state of New York in 1800. He was partly educated in legal studies there. In 1834, James joined Nathaniel Wyeth’s fur trading company, the Columbia River Fishing and Trading Company (CRFTC), that was organized to exploit the fur trade along the west coast of North America.

== Oregon ==
Wyeth’s party arrived in 1834 at the confluence of the Columbia and Willamette rivers at present day Portland, Oregon. O’Neil helped build Wyeth’s Fort William on today’s Sauvie Island. The venture was a failure, and O’Neil moved up the Willamette Valley and took a land claim near what is now Wheatland, Oregon, in 1835. In 1837, the Willamette Cattle Company was formed by area settlers, led by Ewing Young. O’Neil joined the company and sailed to California aboard the Loriot and then drove cattle back to Oregon.

In 1838, he was one of the people to sign a petition circulated around the Euro-American settlements of the Oregon Country that was sent to the United States Congress asking for the United States to extend its jurisdiction over the region. The U.S. did not do so until it formed the Oregon Territory in 1848 after settling the Oregon boundary dispute with Great Britain. In 1841, settler Ewing Young died without an heir, leading to a series of meetings at Champoeg on the French Prairie. At a later meeting in 1843, settlers voted 52 to 50 in favor of forming the Provisional Government of Oregon with O’Neil voting with the proponents.

Following this vote, he assisted in the creation of the government by serving on the first legislative committee that wrote the Organic laws of Oregon, and was elected as a justice of the peace for the Yamhill District. This assistance included selling several legal texts to the legislative committee to help frame the Organic law. In 1845, he was elected as a judge for the district. O’Neil also built a grist mill that year, the first in what became Polk County.

== Later years ==
O’Neil then moved to Benton County and lived at Tampico where he operated a store. In 1853, he joined a commission working to build a railroad connection to California, remaining until 1854. The next year he married Tabitha C. Bowman.

James A. O’Neil died in September 1874, at his farm in Polk County near the community of Lewisville. He was buried there, but later moved to the Hart Cemetery.
