= William H. Gray (Oregon politician) =

American pioneer of Oregon Country, politician and historian

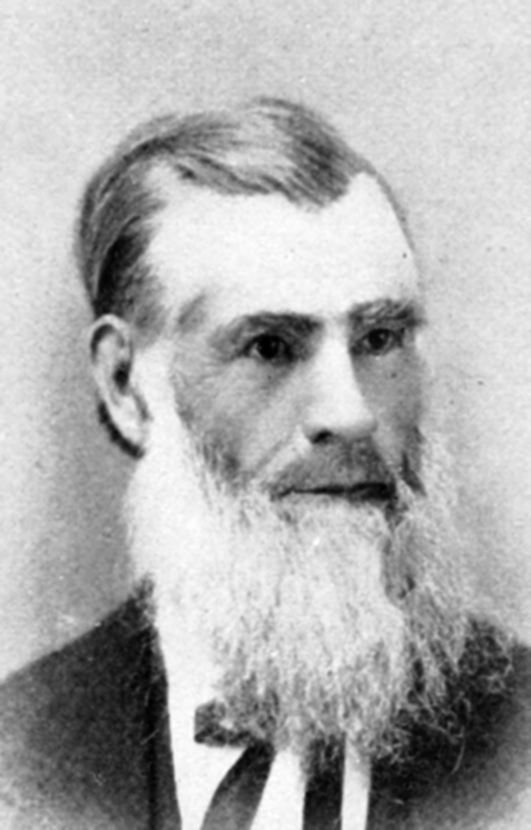

Member of the Provisional Legislature of Oregon
- In office 1843; 1845
- Constituency: Clackamas District

Personal details
- Born: 1810
- Died: 1889 (aged 78–79)
- Children: Caroline Augusta Gray

William Henry Gray (1810–1889) was a pioneer politician and historian of the Oregon Country in the present-day U.S. state of Oregon. He was an active participant in creating the Provisional Government of Oregon. Gray later wrote the book A History of Oregon, 1792-1849 and was instrumental in the establishment of the Oregon Pioneer Society.

== Biography ==
Gray came from New York. He came to the Oregon Country as a lay member of the Spalding-Whitman missionary group in 1836. He returned to New York in 1838 where he married Mary Augusta Dix. After a journey of 129 days they joined in Whitman and his wife. They were sent to work with the Spaldings in Idaho until November 1842.

Gray resigned his post in 1842, he went to the Salem area to work at the Oregon Institute. Gray later became a farmer and a sawmill operator.

In the spring of 1843, Gray's house was the site of the first "Wolf Meeting", as part of the ongoing Champoeg Meetings. At a pioneer gathering on May 2, 1843, the French-Canadians and Americans present were divided about forming a "civil community." Joseph Meek called for the division, and Gray seconded the motion for a division on the question. After voting on each article presented, the basis of the Provisional Government of Oregon was laid. Afterwards Gray was a member of the provisional legislature and of the committee that drafted the First Organic Laws for the provisional government.

In 1854 he purchased a sheep flock numbering 400 in Iowa and took them overland across the continent. Using a scow and the assistance of a steamboat, Gray sailed down the Columbia River for the Clatsop Plains. While navigating from Astoria the scow was harangued by a storm and sunk at Chinook Point with all of Gray's livestock.

Gray had eight children, five boys and three girls. The second child was Caroline Augustus Gray, born 1840, who married Jacob Kamm in 1859 or 1860.

Published in 1870, Gray's A History of Oregon was not well received by historians of his era:

"It would require a book as large as Gray's to correct Gray's mistakes," wrote Frances Fuller Victor in History of the Northwest Coast. "It has...three faults—lack of arrangement, acrimonious partisanship, and disregard for truth." Bancroft, History of Oregon. "[Gray's] book, in my best judgment, is a bitter, prejudiced, sectarian, controversial work in the form of a history," said Peter H. Burnett in his Recollections and Opinions of an Old Pioneer.

Historian Edward Gaylord Bourne endorsed these reviews in his 1902 article The Legend of Marcus Whitman. In 1936 historian T. C. Elliott described the book as "his so-called History of Oregon."

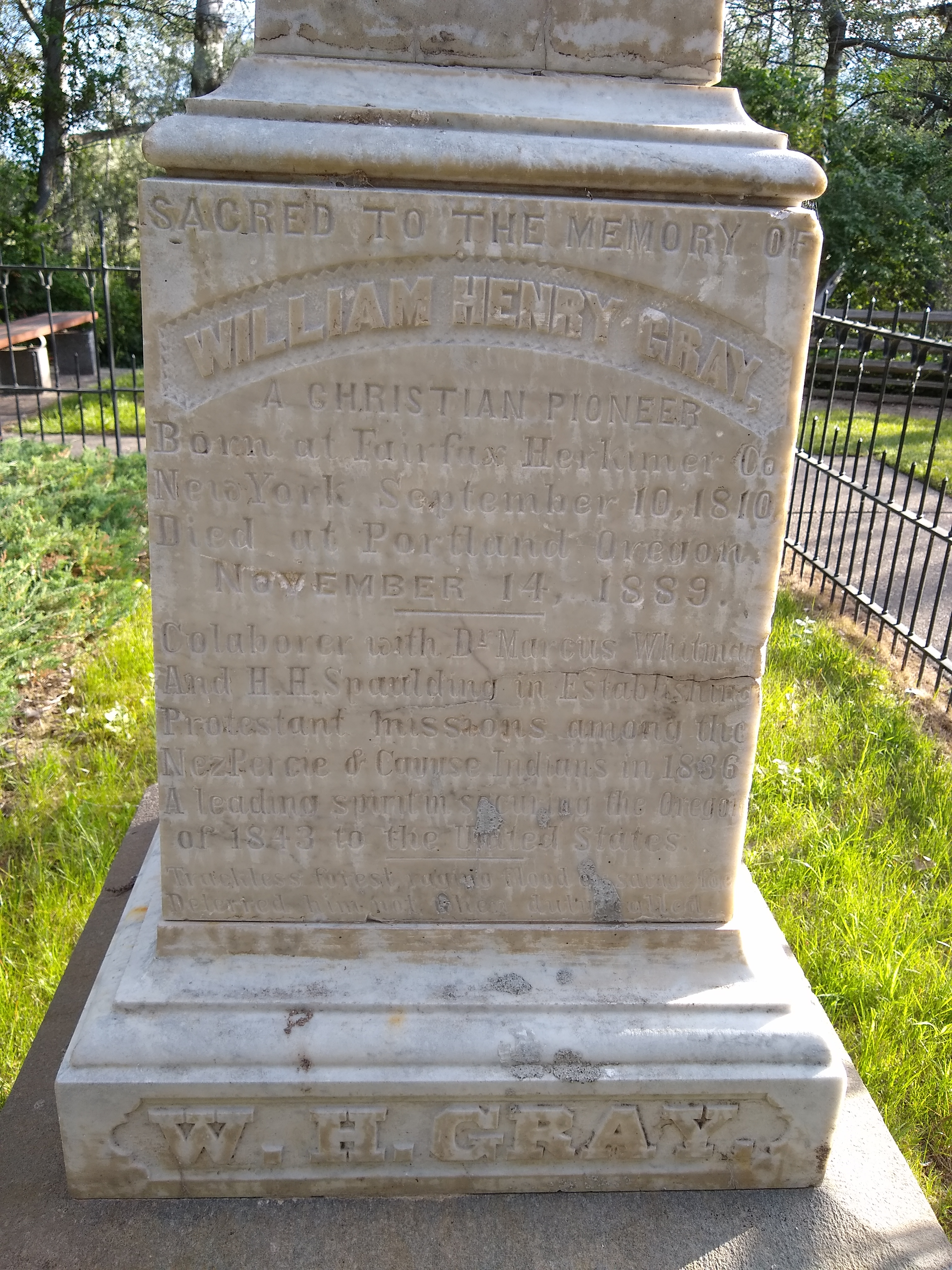
William H. Gray's tombstone next to the Great Grave near Walla Walla, Washington

Both a pioneer and a historian of Oregon, Gray is credited with being the guiding spirit behind establishment of the Oregon Pioneer Society at a meeting held in the hall of the House of Representatives at the Oregon State Capitol in Salem in October 1867. He is buried at the site of the Whitman massacre next to the great grave near Walla Walla, Washington.

== Works ==
- A History of Oregon, 1792-1849: Drawn from Personal Observation and Authentic Information. Portland, OR: Harris & Holman, 1870.
