= Joseph Gervais =

French-Canadian pioneer settler and trapper

- Born: October 21, 1777; Maskinongé, Quebec, British North America, present day Canada
- Died: July 14, 1861 (aged 83); Oregon
- Occupations: trapper, hunter, prospector, farmer

Joseph Gervais (October 21, 1777 – July 14, 1861) was a French-Canadian, later American, pioneer settler and trapper in the Pacific Northwest. He is the namesake for the town of Gervais, Oregon.

== Early life ==
Joseph Gervais was born in Maskinongé, Quebec, Canada (British North America at the time) along the St. Lawrence River. Jean Baptiste Gervais was likely his younger brother. At the age of 20 Joseph left home and spent time employed as a trapper and along the Arkansas River (in what was part of Louisiana) hunting buffalo to be sold in New Orleans.

== Pacific Fur Company ==
Joseph Gervais joined the Pacific Fur Company, a venture owned by John Jacob Astor. Gervais joined the overland expedition headed by Wilson Price Hunt on August 7, 1810, being hired in Michilimackinac. The party arrived at Fort Astoria on February 15, 1812. Later that year Gervais went with a group to the Willamette Valley under the leadership of Donald Mackenzie. They were sent to scout the area and educate the native Kalapuya inhabitants on how to better preserve fur pelts that the trappers were especially interested in acquiring. During this trip he was involved with a fight with a Kalapuya man and on a second trip that fall he became familiar with Étienne Lucier, with both later settling in the area. By October 1813, Gervais had married a Chinookan woman.

== Later years as trapper ==
During the fall of 1813 the British North West Company (NWC) purchased the assets of the PFC during the War of 1812. This included Fort Astoria, which was renamed to Fort George. During the winter of 1813 to 1814, he stayed at the fort and worked for the NWC. After trapping for both the North West Company and as an independent trapper, he joined the Hudson's Bay Company (HBC) in 1824 and was based out of Fort Vancouver. By 1828 he had made a land claim at Chemaway and lived there intermittently until 1831. In January 1828 Alexander McKenzie was killed along with several other HBC employees on Hood Canal in modern Washington. Gervais and other HBC employees were sent to retaliate against those in Klallam nation responsible for the killings. That fall he also went to the Umpqua River Valley in Southern Oregon to retrieve the merchandise left when 15 members of Jedediah Smith's trapping party were killed by Umpqua natives.

== Willamette Valley ==
In 1831, after working for the Hudson's Bay Company, Gervais permanently settled on French Prairie at the site of what is now the town of Gervais. There he built a square-hewed, two-story log cabin that measured 18 by 24 feet (5.5 by 7.3 m) He also constructed a post-in-sill style barn, grew an apple orchard, and grew wheat on the 125-acre (51 ha) parcel. On the property he had 65-acre (26 ha) under cultivation and several outbuildings including a grist mill. Chief Factor John McLoughlin gave financial support to Gervais and other French-Canadian retired employees, giving them farming implements on credit. The French-Canadians had to remain on the payrolls of the HBC, and could be ejected from the Oregon Country if their behavior wasn't satisfactory. In 1834, Jason Lee arrived to build the Methodist Mission on the prairie, and for a time preached to the French-Canadian trappers at Gervais' home as Catholic priests had yet to arrive in Oregon Country. A guest to his house that year described a meal consisting of "Canadian soup, excellent pork, and beaver, and bread made without bolting, and as fine muskmelons as I ever had." In 1836, along with most Catholics in the valley, he signed a petition sent to Norbert Provencher, Titular Bishop of Juliopolis, requesting Catholic clergy.

In 1841, Gervais was elected justice of the peace. In March 1843, Gervais' house was the site of the "Second Wolf Meeting", which provided for a bounty on predators and other protections for the settlers of the Willamette Valley and was a part of the settlers' Champoeg Meetings. Gervais was also a member of the organizing committee of the Champoeg Meetings, where on May 2, 1843, a vote was taken to create a government in the area. Although Gervais voted against a civil authority, the vote passed and the Provisional Government of Oregon was formed. Gervais eventually became a U.S. citizen. In the aftermath of the Whitman Massacre, two of his children, Isaac and Xavier, joined the settler's militia in a conflict known as the Cayuse War.

== Later years and death ==
Once news of the California Gold Rush reached the valley in 1848, Gervais went south to the gold fields, but returned within a few years. Joseph Gervais had a total of three wives and many children. His first wife was Chinookan and they had a son named David and daughter named Julie. Upon her death he married Yi-a-must (later Marguerite), a daughter of Clatsop chief Coboway, and they had four children. She died of diphtheria in 1840 and Joseph married a third time, to Marie Angelique. A Chinook, she bore one child, Rosalie. In 1850, he lost his farm by foreclosure and died July 14, 1861, at the home of David Mongraine and Catherine Lafantasie in French Prairie. Gervais was buried in the Old Cemetery at St. Paul.
