= George LeBreton =

American politician

Recorder for the Provisional Government of Oregon
- In office 1841–1844
- Preceded by: Office Established
- Succeeded by: Overton Johnson
- Constituency: Oregon Country

Personal details
- Born: 1810 Massachusetts
- Died: March 4, 1844 (aged 33–34) Oregon

George W. LeBreton (1810 – March 4, 1844) was a pioneer politician in the Oregon Country and served as the official recorder in the Provisional Government of Oregon.

== Early life ==
George W. LeBreton was born in the year 1810 in Massachusetts. LeBreton traveled to Oregon in 1840 aboard the vessel Maryland of Captain John H. Couch, an early sea merchant in Portland.

== Career ==
On 18 February 1841, he was elected as the recorder for the Champoeg Meetings and for the probate court that was created. In 1843, when the provisional government was formed, he was again elected as the recorder, the forerunner to the office of Secretary of State.

== Death and legacy ==
LeBreton was a key figure in the Cockstock incident of 4 March 1844. A group of settlers, led by LeBreton tried to capture Cockstock, a Molala man. During the ensuing violence LeBreton was stabbed, shot, and killed by Cockstock. In turn, his attacker was killed by Winslow Armstrong. In the aftermath a militia unit called the Oregon Rangers was formed.

== See also ==
- List of assassinated American politicians
