= Étienne Lucier =

French-Canadian fur trader

- Born: June 9, 1786; Chambly, Quebec
- Died: March 8, 1853 (aged 66); French Prairie
- Occupations: fur trapper, farmer

Étienne Lucier, né Lussier, (June 9, 1786 – March 8, 1853) was a French-Canadian fur trader active primarily in the Pacific Northwest. He was hired by John Jacob Astor's Pacific Fur Company and sent to the region to help establish Fort Astoria. Later he became a settler in the Willamette Valley. Lucier attended the Champoeg Meetings and was one of few French-Canadians or "Canadiens" to vote for the Provisional Government of Oregon, an American and Canadian civil authority for the valley. He is credited with becoming the first European descendant farmer within the modern state of Oregon.

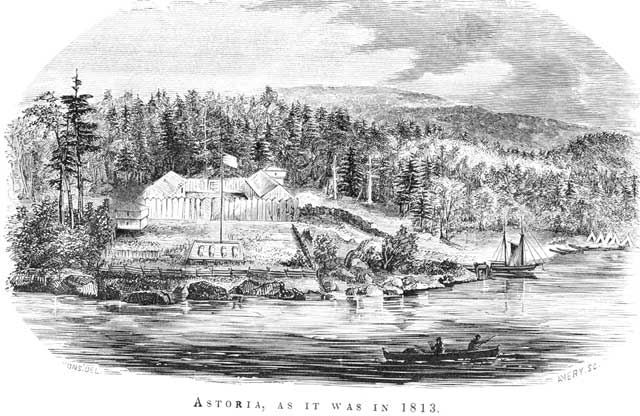
Engraving of Fort Astoria, Oregon, around 1813

== Early life ==
Étienne Lucier was born on June 9, 1786, at Boucherville in Chambly County, Quebec. His parents were Michel Lussier and Marie Victoire Edeline Delisle. His god parents were Etienne Lasourde and Marie Anne Laubeil according to the entries in the register of the parish church. Other western explorers with ties to Boucherville include Jacques Denoyon, the family Gaultier de la Verendrye, and Toussaint Charbonneau.

== Fur trade ==
Lucier joined the Pacific Fur Company in 1810, a newly established fur trading venture that was funded largely by German-American merchant John Jacob Astor. The PFC had a notably diverse workforce. The majority were British subjects of several different cultural backgrounds. The other company partners were either Scottish or American. French-Canadians typically served as voyageurs and trappers, with a number of Iroquois working in these vital roles as well. The remaining employees were Americans, Anglo-Canadian, British, or Hawaiian Kanakas.

Lucier was assigned to travel overland in an expedition led by Wilson Price Hunt to the Pacific Northwest. The group reached the mouth of the Columbia River in February 1812, where work on Fort Astoria was already begun. Despite the initial work of the company, the PFC folded due to the War of 1812 and its assets were sold to the North West Company (NWC). In October 1813, Lucier joined the NWC and became a trader for them. He then married an Indigenous woman and moved to the Willamette Valley in the same year. After the merger of the NWC into the Hudson's Bay Company (HBC) in 1821, he became an employee of the HBC. Lucier shortly afterwards made a land claim on what is now Portland, Oregon.

== French Prairie ==
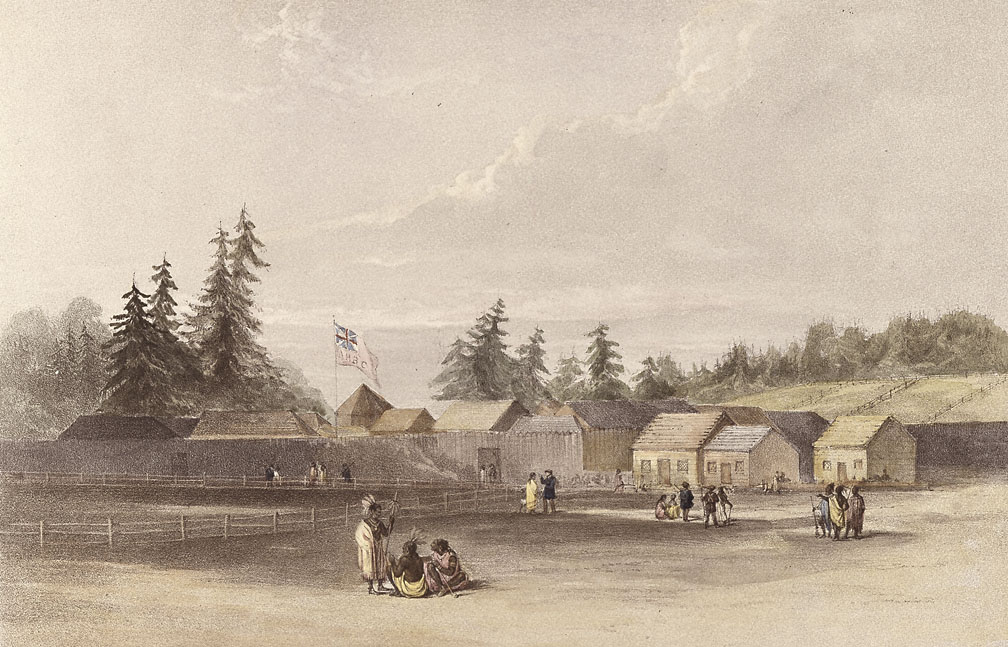
Fort Vancouver around 1845

Lucier established a permanent land claim next to the Willamette Fur Post near Champoeg on the French Prairie by 1829. Chief Factor John McLoughlin of the HBC at Fort Vancouver helped Lucier with farming supplies, including livestock that helped establish Lucier as Oregon's first Euro-Canadian farmer. On his 80 acres (32 ha) farm he raised pigs and hogs, cattle, peaches, and wheat that were enclosed by a split-rail fence. Lucier's farm had a 1 1/2-story double-hewn log home, a grist mill, a framed barn, and a warehouse used for wheat. His farm was adjacent to Pierre Belleque's farm.

On March 22, 1836, he and 15 other French Canadian settlers on the prairie representing 77 settlers and their children signed a petition sent to Norbert Provencher, the titular Bishop of Juliopolis, requesting a priest for the settlement. At that time he had six children. In 1843, Lucier was a participant at the Champoeg Meetings that lead to the creation of the Provisional Government of Oregon. He was one of two French Canadian early settlers that joined with the American bloc to vote for the creation of the government on May 2, 1843. Then in 1851 Lucier became an American citizen in order to secure his land claim via the Donation Land Act.

== Family ==
On the French Prairie, Étienne Lucier married for a second time as his first wife, Josephte Nouite, had died. He fathered eight children in total from both women. One of his daughters, Félicité Lucier, married to chief factor Donald Manson, and they became the parents of fur trader John D. Manson, who married to Aurelia Yale, daughter of chief trader James Murray Yale.

== Bibliography ==
- McDougall, Duncan (1999), Jones, Robert F. (ed.), Annals of Astoria: The Headquarters Log of the Pacific Fur Company on the Columbia River, 1811-1813, New York City: Fordham University Press
- West, Oswald (1942), "Oregon's First White Settlers on French Prairie", Oregon Historical Quarterly, 43 (3), Oregon Historical Society: 198–209
