= French Prairie =

Grassland in Marion County, Oregon, US

Coordinates: 45°11′05″N 122°57′33″W

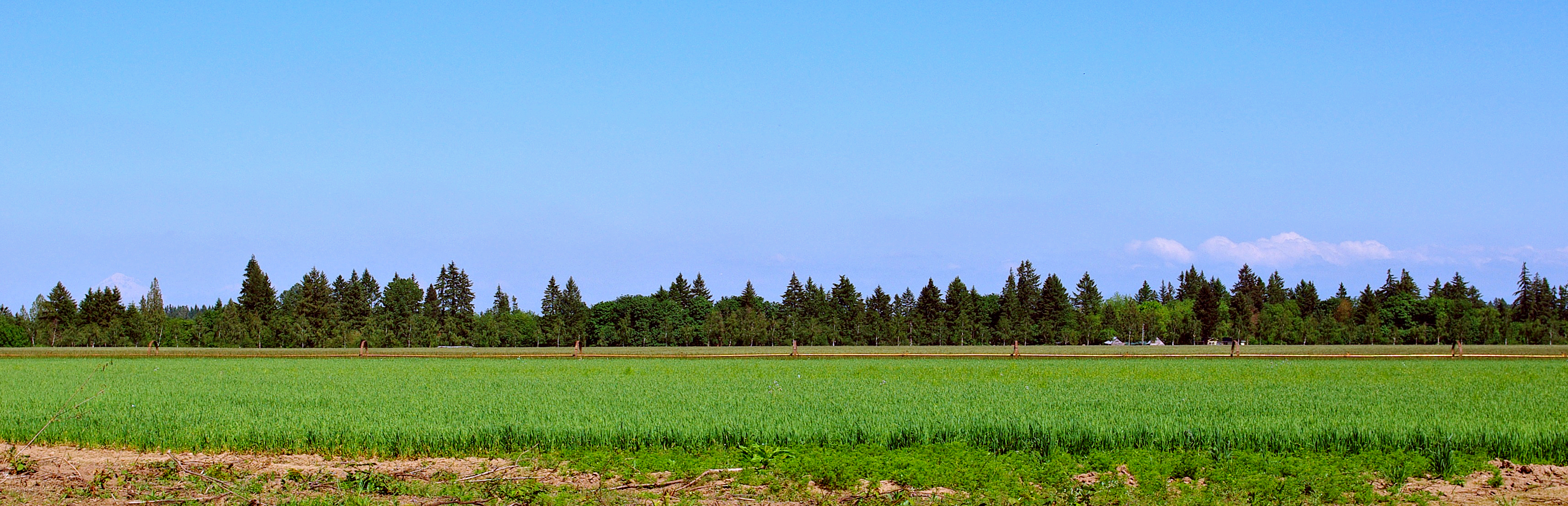
Looking northeast toward Mount Hood (left)

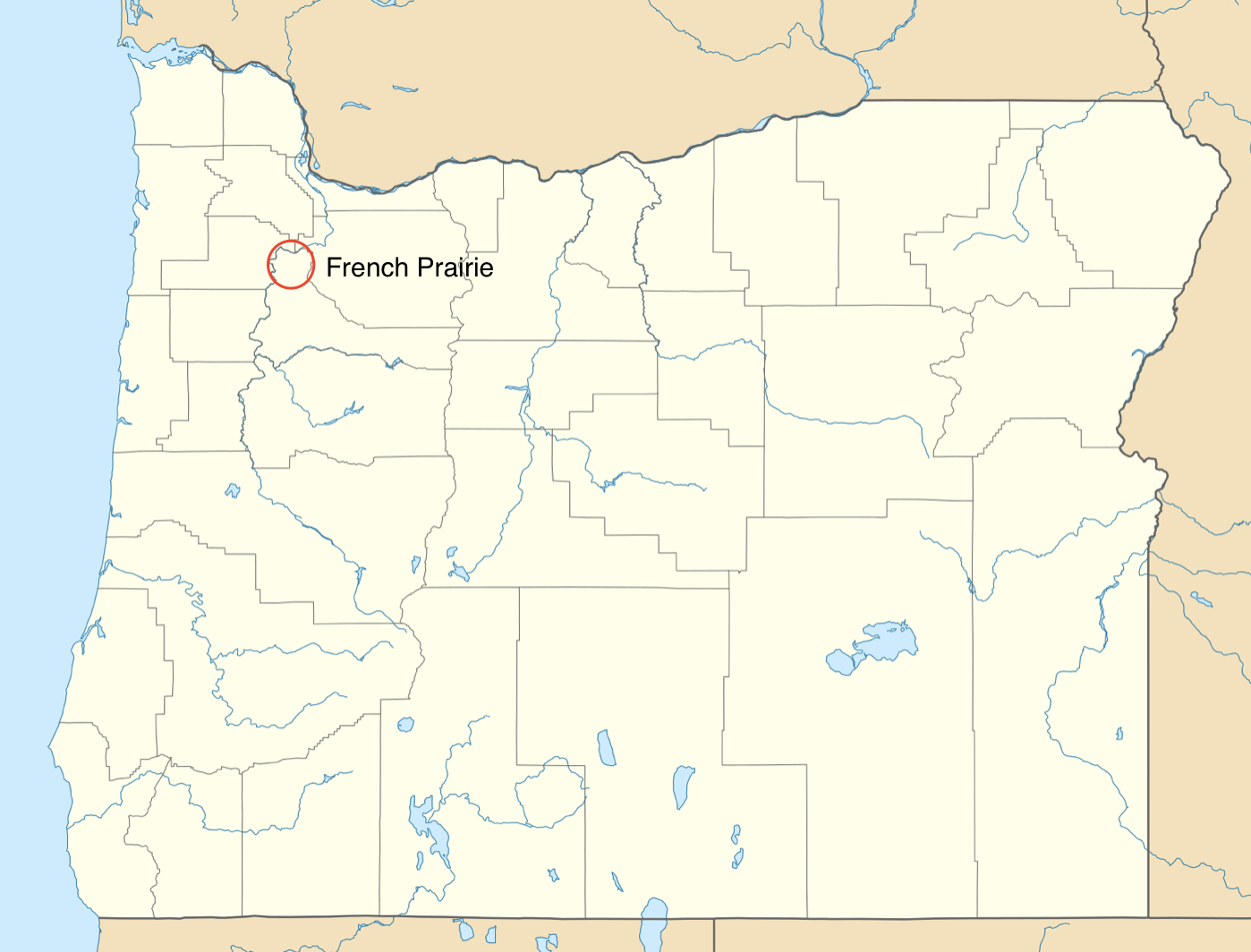
Location of the French Prairie in Oregon

French Prairie is located in Marion County, Oregon, United States, in the Willamette Valley between the Willamette River and the Pudding River, north of Salem. The prairie area roughly corresponds to the traditional land of the Kalapuya people much decimated by pandemics during the 1830s. The fertile land would become highly contended for. The area was subsequently named after some of the earliest settlers of that part of the Oregon Country, French Canadian/Métis people who were mostly former employees of the Hudson's Bay Company. "French Prairie" naming was first captured in writing in the early 1850s by a French Consul to California visiting Oregon. Pierre Charles Fournier de Saint-Amant referred to the area as "les prairies françaises". French Prairie is also known as an early Métis settlement in the Pacific Northwest history.

== History ==
=== Early settlement (non-Indigenous) ===
Wallace House was first established in 1812 by William Wallace Matthews and John C. Halsley. The Pacific Fur Company temporary outpost of Fort Astoria was located at the southern end of French Prairie, North of present-day city of Salem, Oregon. The Willamette Trading Post was established in 1814 by the North West Company near the site of Champoeg.

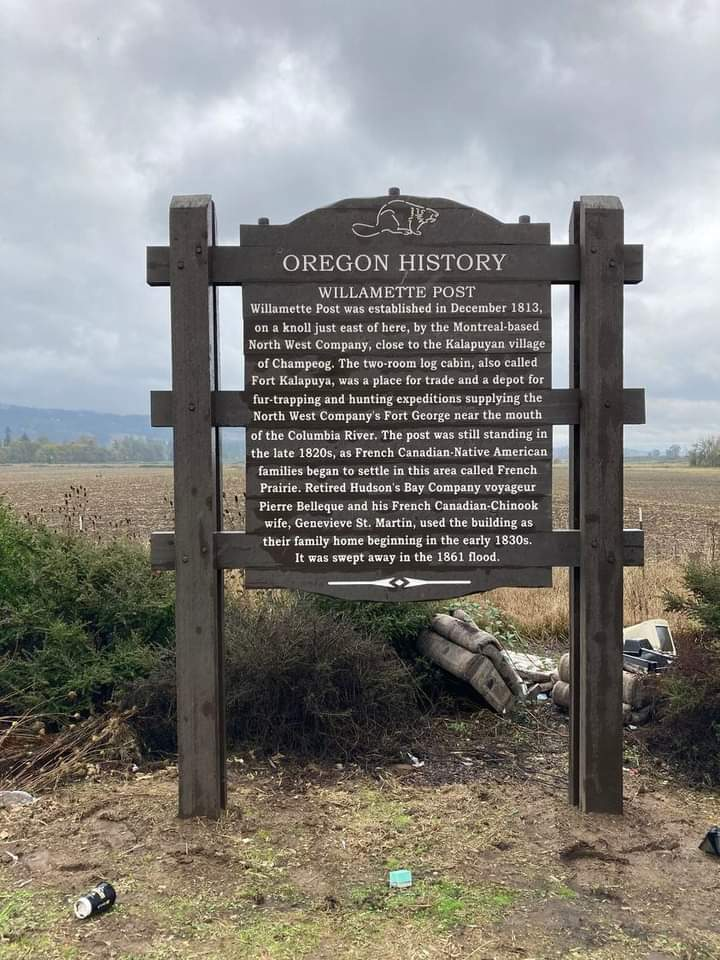
Road signage historical marker (summer 2022) for the Willamette Trading Post

By 1829, Étienne Lucier was establishing a land claim nearby and starting to settle and retire with the help of its Hudson's Bay Company employer. Lucier was soon joined settling with Joseph Gervais (1831), Joseph Delore (1832), Pierre Belleque (1833) and others in the following years: J.B. Desportes McKay, J.B. Perrault, Louis Labonté, Amable Arquette, Pierre Dépôt and André Picard.

By 1836, sixteen Roman Catholic French Canadian settlers representing a group of 77 were petitioning Norbert Provencher, the Bishop of Juliopolis at the Red River Colony (present-day Winnipeg, Manitoba, Canada) to have a priest sent to them. Bishop François Norbert Blanchet finally arrived in 1838. A log cabin church previously erected by the fur traders was used for the first ever Catholic mass held in early 1839 with portion of the sermon conveyed in Chinook Jargon.

These first French Canadian settlers built hewn log homes in the French style and started wheat farms. The homes were built with clay and stick chimneys, ash bark roofs, and animal skin windows that were similar to the homes built on the eastern Canadian frontier. Houses and barns were built using the same building method square timbers "Posts on a sill" used by the HBC. By 1843, approximately 100 French Canadian/Métis families lived on the prairie.

The St. Louis Catholic Church located close to Gervais was built in 1845 by the original settlers of French Prairie and ranks amongst the oldest Oregon churches. The St. Paul Roman Catholic Church was built one year later and represents the oldest brick building still standing in the Pacific Northwest.

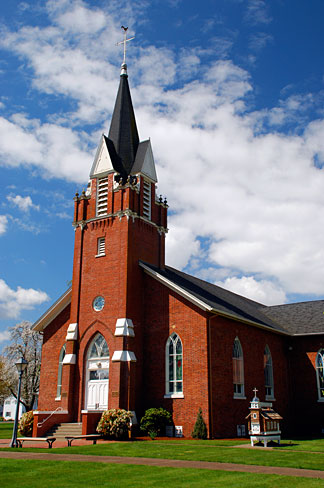
St. Paul Roman Catholic Church in St. Paul

=== Later settlement ===
For a short time in the 1880s the Oregonian Railway Company had a station named French Prairie about two miles southeast of the city of St. Paul.

=== French Prairie today ===
The French Prairie area is still an important agricultural area of the Willamette Valley, and there is concern about urban development encroaching on arable land.

== Geography ==
Generally, the French Prairie is bounded by the Pudding River on the east, the Salem metropolitan area on the south, and the Willamette River on both the north and west as the Willamette makes a 90 degree turn to the south near Newberg. Settlements on French Prairie founded by French Canadians include Butteville, Champoeg, Gervais, Saint Louis, and St. Paul.

== Notable residents ==
- Pierre Belleque
- Marie Aioe Dorion
- Joseph Gervais
- Michel Laframboise
- Étienne Lucier
- François X. Matthieu
