= Willamette Trading Post =

Fur trade facility in Oregon, US

Coordinates: 45.2651°N 122.9454°W

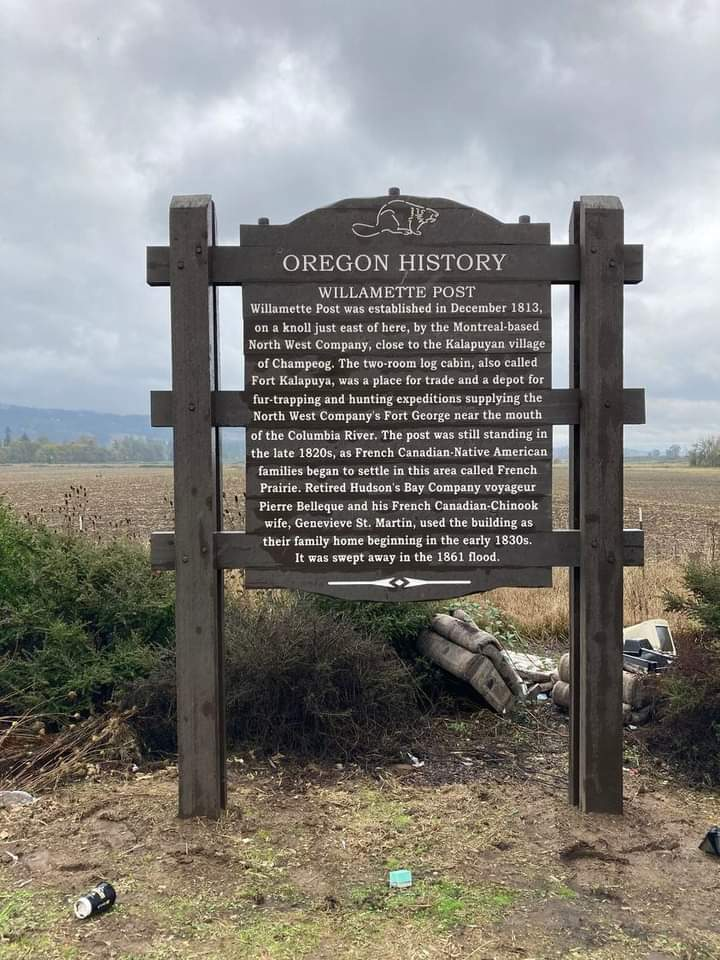
Marker introduces the historical trading post

The Willamette Trading Post or Willamette Fur Post was a fur trade facility owned by the North West Company established near the Willamette River in what would become the French Prairie in Oregon Country. Established around 1813 in what is now the state of Oregon in the United States, the post was a small fur station where trappers working in the Willamette Valley could exchange their pelts and hides for other trade goods.

== Founding ==
This trade outpost was established around 1813 by the North West Company, a British owned fur trading concern. It was built southeast of the current city of Newberg on the eastern shore (or southern due to an east-west stretch of the river at this location) of the Willamette River. The location was a few miles west of Champoeg.

== Operations ==
Built as a trade depot, the post was used by the North West Company for trading and as a game relay spot in support of their main outpost Fort George at the mouth of the Columbia River. In 1821, the North West Company was merged into the Hudson's Bay Company (HBC) and the HBC took control of the fur post. The HBC then used the facility as a rendezvous point for their traders forming fur brigades before traveling to points to the south.

The Willamette Trading Post remained in use until the mid-1830s. In later years, former North West Company and HBC employee Pierre Belleque settled a land claim and began farming at the site around 1833. He lived in the former building for a time, as his wife was related to an HBC officer.
