= Donation Land Claim Act =

Statute to promote homesteading in the Oregon Territory

- Long title: An Act to create the Office of Surveyor-General of the Public Lands in Oregon, and to provide for the Survey, and to make Donation to Settlers of the said Public Lands
- Nicknames: Donation Land Act
- Enacted by: the 31st United States Congress
- Effective: September 27, 1850

Citations
- Statutes at Large: 9 Stat. 496

Legislative history
- Signed into law by President Millard Fillmore on September 27, 1850

The Donation Land Claim Act of 1850, sometimes known as the Donation Land Act, was a statute enacted by the United States Congress in late 1850, intended to promote homestead settlements in the Oregon Territory. It followed the Distribution-Preemption Act 1841. The law, a forerunner of the later Homestead Act, brought thousands of settlers into the new territory, swelling their ranks along the Oregon Trail. 7,437 land patents were issued under the law, which expired in late 1855. The Donation Land Claim Act allowed white men or partial Native Americans (mixed with white) who had arrived in Oregon before 1850 to work on a piece of land for four years and legally claim the land for themselves.

Along with other US land grant legislation, the Donation Land Claim Act discriminated against nonwhite settlers and dispossessed land from Native Americans.

== History ==
The passage of the law was largely due to the efforts of Samuel R. Thurston, the Oregon territorial delegate to Congress. The act, which became law on 27 September 1850, granted 320 acres (1.3 km^{2}) of designated areas free of charge to every unmarried white male citizen eighteen or older and 640 acres (2.6 km^{2}) to every married couple arriving in the Oregon Territory before 1 December 1850. In the case of a married couple, the husband and wife each owned half of the land under their own name. The law was one of the first that allowed married women in the United States to hold property under their own name. American "half-breed Indians" were also eligible for the grant. A provision in the law granted half the amount to those who arrived after the 1850 deadline but before 1854. Claimants were required to live on the land and to cultivate it for four years to gain ownership title to it.

== Limitations ==
The provisional government formed at Champoeg had limited the land claims offered in the hope of preventing land speculation. The Organic Act of the Oregon Territory had granted 640 acres (1 square mile, 2.6 km^{2}) to each married couple. The new law voided the previous statutes but essentially continued the same policy and was worded in such a way as to legitimize existing claims. One such claim legitimized by the act was that of George Abernethy, who had been elected to the governorship in the days of the provisional government. His claim became famous for Abernethy Green, where new emigrants camped at the end of the Oregon Trail while seeking a piece of land for themselves.

== Details ==
Claims under the law were granted at the federal land office in Oregon City. The most famous patent granted at the Oregon City Land Office was the plat for the city of San Francisco, which had to be sent up the coast from California by ship. The claims of the land were surveyed by the Surveyor General of Oregon, an office created out of the law. As part of the general survey, the Willamette Stone was placed just west of Portland, defining the Willamette Meridian.

== Final year and aftermath ==
After the 1855 cutoff date, the designated land in Oregon was no longer free but was still available, selling at $1.25 an acre ($3.09/hectare), with a limit of 320 acres (1.3 km^{2}) in any one claim. The law expired on December 1, 1855. In the following years, the price was raised and the maximum size of claims was progressively lowered. The government's only goal was to raise the population in that area.

In 1862, Congress passed the first of the "Homestead Acts", which were largely designed to encourage settlement of the Great Plains states but applied to Oregon as well.

== See also ==
- Willamette Valley
- Rogue Valley
