= Portland Telegram =

Defunct newspaper in Portland, Oregon, U.S.

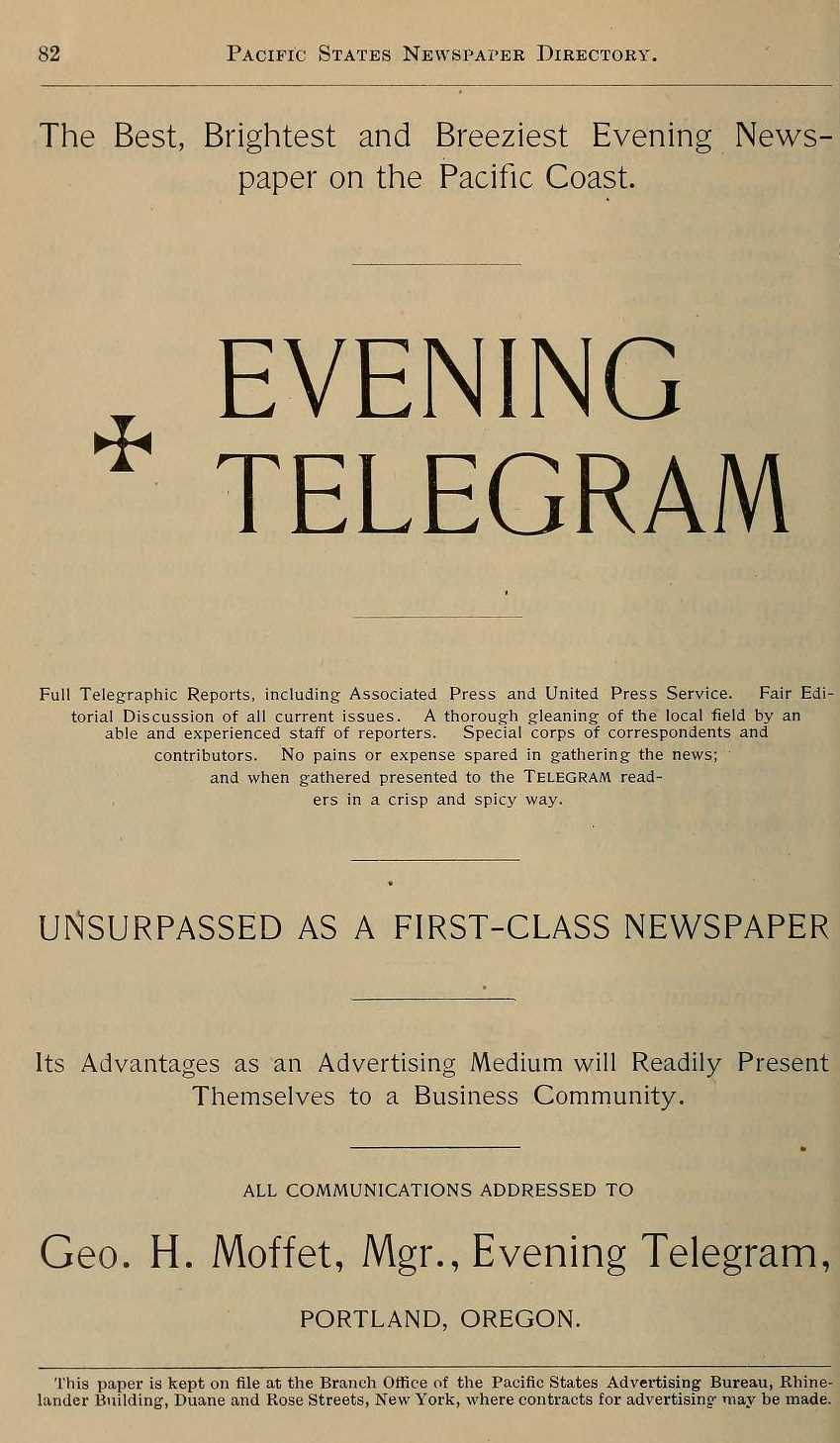
- Advertisement for the Evening Telegram in a national newspaper directory in 1894
- Type: Daily newspaper
- Founder: Henry Pittock
- Founded: 1877
- Ceased publication: 1939
- City: Portland, Oregon

The Portland Telegram was a daily newspaper serving Portland in the U.S. state of Oregon from 1877 until it was acquired by, and merged into, the Scripps-owned Portland News in 1931. The News had started out as the East Side News under secretive circumstances in 1906. The Telegram was a Democratic paper, despite its founder being a staunch Republican. The Portland News-Telegram ceased in 1939 due competition from The Oregonian.

== History ==
The Telegram was founded in 1877 by Henry Pittock, who had founded The Oregonian 16 years prior. His ownership connected the Telegram to the Oregonian; while the Oregonian was a solidly Republican paper, the Telegram tended Democratic, in order to keep competitors out of the field. It is said to have dominated the afternoon news field in Portland until the advent of the Oregon Journal in 1902.

Beginning in the 1850s and '60s, Oregon journalism was characterized by bitter editorial attacks among competing newspaper publishers, a condition referred to as the "Oregon style" of journalism. A. C. McDonald, one of the owners of the Telegram Publishing Company, was killed in a duel with James K. Mercer, assistant editor of the Portland Bee, over an editorial dispute in 1878.

The paper had a high degree of turnover in its leadership in its first decade. One consistent presence was Catherine Amanda Coburn, sister of Harvey W. Scott and Abigail Scott Duniway, who ran the editorial page from 1883 to 1888, when she left for the Oregonian. Richard D. Cannon arrived as editor in 1888, and was credited with improving society and sports coverage. He left the paper in the early 1890s, but returned in 1904. Other editors included J. B. Fithian and S. A. Moreland. The radical journalist Eleanor Baldwin wrote for the paper between 1906 and 1909, in her daily columns for the editorial page called “A Woman’s Point of View." Lumbermen John E. and L. R. Wheeler bought the paper in 1914; and the Telegram Building, now a historic landmark in Portland, was built during their tenure.

Several unpopular campaigns, including one against the Ku Klux Klan, brought the paper into bankruptcy. In 1922 an East Oregonian editorial accused the Telegram of opposing the interests of Eastern Oregon and meddling, more than other Portland papers, in electoral politics. In May 1927, the Telegram's lawsuit against the Oregon Journal was dismissed. The suit aimed to prevent the sale of three comics to the Journal from the Bell Syndicate, with the Telegram arguing it violated its contract with the syndicate.

In March 1927, a judged approved a petition by the Telegram's creditors to force the paper into receivership. In April, the paper declared bankruptcy. During this time employees attempted to raise money to buy the Telegram. However, the paper was sold to Portland attorney David E. Lofgren, one of the paper's principal creditors, for $226,000, beating out a $200,000 bid from Portland News. That year Carl H. Brockhagen, co-owner of The Sacramento Union, was made president and publisher of the Telegram. Brockhagen managed the paper until the 1931 merger with the News. According to Oregon newspaper historian George Turnbull, following the merger, the character of the consolidated paper reflected the News more than the Telegram, though the Telegram provided "a number of valuable staff members."

== Portland News-Telegram ==
The East Side News was a newspaper founded in Portland on September 35, 1906. It was financed by the Scripps-Canfield publishing house of Seattle, but in complete secrecy, due to a promise E. W. Scripps had made to Sam Jackson of the Oregon Journal, not to compete in the Portland market. In spite of low circulation in its early days, the News constructed a building on Clay St. at a cost of $50,000. In 1931 the Portland News purchased the Portland Telegram from C. H. Brockhagen, and merged the two papers to form the News-Telegram.

On August 21, 1939, the paper ceased, citing rising costs and heavy taxes. Its circulation records were sold to the Oregon Journal who made arrangements to start publishing the defunct paper's features and comics, including columns from Boake Carter and John Franklin Carter. The Medford Mail Tribune called the News-Telegram its "favorite morning paper on the coast" and blamed the papers demise on a "decline of the editorial vigor and excellence."
