= Portland Bee =

- Type: Daily, Weekly
- Format: Broadsheet
- Owner(s): Doran H. "Don" Stearns (founder) (1875-1879/1880) W.S. Chapman (briefly); C.L. Packard (1879-1882) Atkinson & Farrish (1880-1882)
- Editor: James K. Mercer (1875-1878); Catherine A. Coburn (1879-1880)
- Founded: November 1875
- Ceased publication: 1882
- Political alignment: Republican
- Headquarters: Portland, Oregon, United States
- Circulation: 1,000

The Portland Bee was a Republican newspaper in Portland in the U.S. state of Oregon in the late 19th century. It was launched in November 1875, the same year as the Portland Daily Bulletin disincorporated; like the Bulletin, it had both daily and weekly editions. It initially had two daily editions, and circulated 1,000 free copies.

Though fairly short-lived, the paper has been described as "a journal of force and influence in its time." It was quoted, and its contents syndicated, in numerous contemporary newspapers in its region, and contemporary papers also published general praise for the Bee.

Several of the many owners, publishers, and editors it had during its short tenure were family relations of the editors of other major newspapers of the time, the Oregonian and the New Northwest. Shortly after the paper launched, and after its first ownership transfer, editor James K. Mercer killed the editor of the rival Portland Telegram in a duel. D. H. Stearns, the paper's founder, repurchased the Bee following the scandal, and emphasized the change in leadership in advertisements in newspapers around the state. Following another ownership change, the Bee was renamed the Bulletin in August 1880 and discontinued in 1882.

The Oregon Historical Society acquired archival copies of the Bee upon its incorporation in 1898.

== Leadership ==
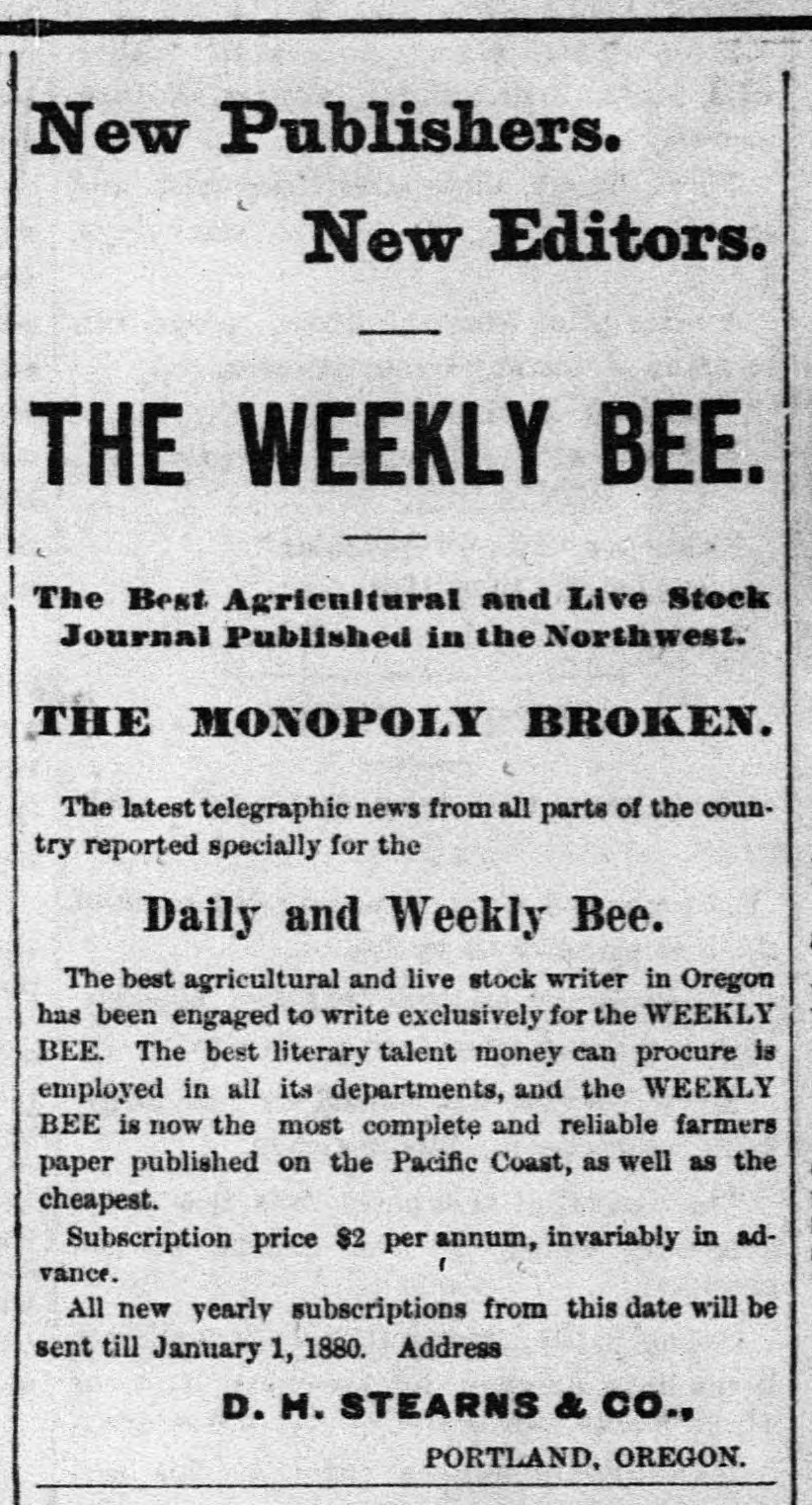
A few months after Mercer killed MacDonald, the Bee emphasized its new leadership and presented itself as the "most complete and reliable farmers paper published on the Pacific Coast. Advertisement published in the Douglas Independent, in several editions in December 1878.

Bee founder Doran H. "Don" Stearns had a background in journalism in his native Nebraska, and married into a prominent news family in Portland in the same year he started the Bee: his wife, Clara Belle Duniway, was the only daughter of New Northwest founder Abigail Scott Duniway, and niece of longtime The Oregonian editor Harvey W. Scott. Alfred Holman, later an editor of the Oregonian, started his newspaper career at the Bee in 1876.

In 1878, Bee editor James K. Mercer engaged in an ongoing war of words with A. C. MacDonald of the Portland Telegram, through the columns of both papers. The conflict escalated to a duel, with Mercer fatally shooting MacDonald in 1878. Mercer was indicted for first degree murder and went to prison for 15 years. Detailed witness testimony from the ensuing murder trial was published in the Oregonian.

W. S. Chapman, a Portland city surveyor and son of Oregonian founder William W. Chapman, bought the paper from Stearns, but later sold it back to him. He was the owner and editor at the time of Mercer's altercation with McDonald. A contemporaneous article in the Oregonian about McDonald's death described the Bee as a "deadly stench to all decent people who come in contact with it."

Upon his return to the Bee, Stearns hired his wife's aunt, Catherine Amanda Coburn, who edited the paper from 1879 to 1880. Coburn had previously worked for her sister's paper, the New Northwest. Upon her hire at the Bee, Coburn became one of the few 19th century women editors of a daily newspaper in the western United States. She soon moved on to the Oregonian. The paper also got a new printing press in 1879.

In February 1880, the Corvallis Weekly Gazette published glowing praise for the Bee and for owner Stearns.

Stearns sold half his interest in the Bee to C. L. Packard in 1879, and the remainder to Atkinson & Farrish in 1880. He went on to a successful career in real estate and fruit trees. The Bee was renamed the Bulletin in August 1880 and discontinued in 1882. It was the third Portland paper to carry the name "Bulletin"; Atkinson had launched the first, which lasted only a few months, more than a decade prior.
