= Mary A. Cooke Thompson =

American physician and suffragist

Mary Anna Cooke Thompson
- Born: Mary Anna Cooke; February 14, 1825; New York
- Died: May 14, 1919 (aged 94); Portland, Oregon
- Occupation: Doctor
- Years active: c. 1850 – c. 1918
- Known for: Women's rights activist

Mary Anna Cooke Thompson (1825–1919) was a leader in the first generation of women's rights activists in Oregon and one of Oregon's pioneer doctors, who broke through the barriers to women in medicine.

== Biography ==
Mary Anna Cooke Thompson was born in New York on 14 February 1825. Her parents, Horatio Cooke (1797–1869) and Anna Bennett (1794–1881) were both from England. Mary was their first daughter and second child. The couple met while emigrating to New York, where they would get married later on, in 1821. Of ten children the Cookes had, only seven survived to adulthood. After Mary turned eight, she was removed from school to help her mother with her siblings. A year later, after moving to New Jersey and remaining in charge of taking care of her brother and sisters, Mary started selling wooden novelty items handmade by her father on the streets of Newark, helping with the income of her household.

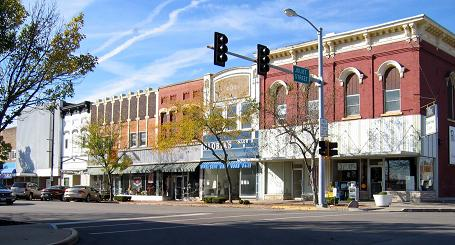
A view of LaSalle, Illinois

In 1837, when Mary was about twelve, she moved to Chicago with her parents and there she met a carpenter from Pennsylvania, Reuben Thompson (1815–1885). They got married on November 14, 1848. Then they moved to LaSalle, Illinois, where they lived for 18 years. The couple had five children, three boys, and two girls but the girls didn't survive. They also adopted a niece. In 1866, they passed through the Isthmus of Panama to settle in Portland, Oregon. Mary's parents and other relatives had already left Chicago and moved there before 1860. Mary's last son, James R., was born in Portland, Oregon, in February 1871. Based on Thompson's diary, Ward states that she had a difficult domestic relationship with her husband, and she feared that her struggles with mental health would limit her work. Reuben Thompson's health deteriorated because of an injury, and he died in 1885. After her husband's death, Mary continued to work, and she also took in boarders. In November 1918, Mary Anna Cooke Thompson suffered a paralytic stroke, and she died six months later, on May 4, 1919, in Portland, Oregon.

== Career in the medical field ==
In the 19th century, women were not allowed to study medicine, since most of the medical schools only accepted men. As L. Magner says in his article Medical Education for Women During the Nineteenth Century, the first female medical colleges were opened in the late 1940s. Elizabeth Blackwell was the first woman in the United States to earn a medical degree in 1849. Unfortunately, many of these schools were short-lived because of all the stereotypes and criticisms they were facing, which were an obstacle to the opening of the medical profession to women. For that reason, Mary Anna Cooke Thompson didn't have any degree, and, according to Ward (2012), she began her medical studies a year after her marriage, in 1849.

Two physicians from Illinois, Dr. Lyman B. Larkin, a homeopathic physician, and Dr. Frances Bry, a graduate of the University of Missouri, allowed her to study medicine with them. They became her tutors and Mary could learn in their practices in LaSalle. She then became the first woman to practice medicine in Illinois, and Iowa as well. In 1855, Thompson joined the first women's rights society in Illinois and a year later, she formed the first women's club in the same state with three other women. The new association rapidly spread, and in 1861, these efforts were rewarded with the Women's Property Act, which granted women control of the property they brought into the marriage. In 1867, she began placing advertisements in Portland's newspapers. She started by calling herself an "Electrician & Eclectic Physician", and then "Dr. Mary A. Thompson, Physician and Accoucheur".

Mary Anna Cooke Thompson practiced medicine in Portland for more than 40 years and was able to manage her career as a physician while raising her family, which represented a great achievement and a model of success for women. Despite the absence of a formal degree that allowed her to be considered a "regular doctor", Mary Thompson was deeply respected and Abigail Scott Duniway said that she was making "a permanent impression on the medical profession of Oregon, in pioneer days, by opening the way for other women physicians of the state, but few of whom realize the importance of her work as a path-breaker". Mary's experience as a physician led her to be concerned with the condition of women and children, especially about childbirth. She also helped with the Underground Railroad and saved the lives of several children and mothers that were being pursued. The Thompsons opened their home to well-known leaders of the Abolitionist Movement, such as Parker Pillsbury.

== Role in the suffragist movement ==
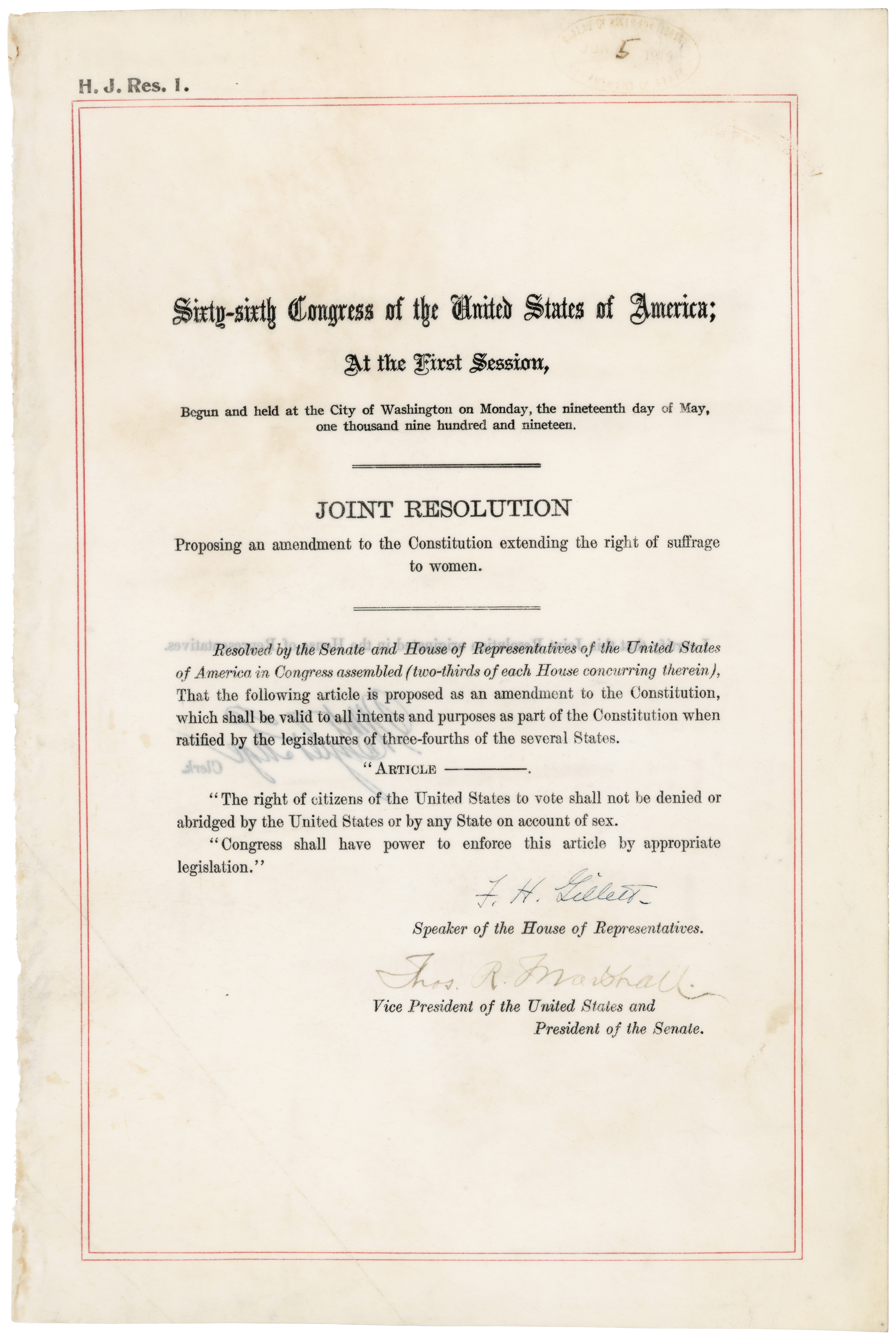
19th amendment of the US constitution

According to Ward, apart from being an advocate for human rights, Mary Thompson also toured the Pacific North-West in the fall of 1871, helping organize the Multnomah County Woman Suffrage Association at Portland's Oro Fino Hall. According to Ward (2012), who found her information in the archives of The New Northwest, Duniway's newspaper, Thompson was always a central figure through all of Oregon's suffrage campaigns, until the victory in 1912. Although she was a truly admired pioneer in Portland, she never reached the celebrity status of her colleague Duniway, distinguished then (and now) as Oregon's "Mother of Equal Suffrage". The two women had much in common personally and worked hard for several shared causes. However, there were often battles between the two women since they disagreed about the movement's goals. Indeed, Mary was in favor of temperance and prohibition. H. P. Thompson defines this movement as "a social reform movement that pursued many approaches to limit or prohibit the use and/or sale of alcoholic beverages" and "arguably the longest-running reform movement in US history, extending from the 1780s through the repeal of national prohibition in 1933.".

Mary Anna Cooke Thompson was really involved in this movement along with her friends, Dr. Bethenia Owens-Adair, an American physician, and Frances Fuller Victor, an American historian and author. They thought that the prohibition of alcohol would reduce the number of cases of women and children being abused by their alcoholic husbands or fathers. On the contrary, Abigail Scott Duniway thought that it would not help the women's suffrage movement but rather be an obstacle, driving away male voters. Yet, Duniway was convinced that men were the key to winning women's suffrage. After Oregon's first defeat of woman suffrage in 1874, Thompson, along with other movement mates, challenged Duniway's leadership of the Oregon State Woman Suffrage Association.

== National Woman Suffrage Association Convention ==
Between 1877 and 1878, Mary Anna Cooke Thompson made a tour in the East to go to the National Woman Suffrage Association Convention in Washington, D.C. Along with twelve other women, she delivered a speech before the US Senate Committee on Privileges and Elections. She called on President Rutherford B. Hayes to support the bill introduced by California Senator Aaron Sargent in 1878. This bill would later become the 19th Amendment, which guarantees American women the right to vote and was eventually ratified by Congress in 1920. Indeed, she was convinced that giving voting rights to women would be a solution to put an end to corruption. On her way to the National Woman Suffrage Association Convention, she wrote a diary, The Diary of Dr. Mary Thompson, which is available in the Special Collections and Archives of the Lewis & Clark College. She then visited some friends with whom she worked, like Frederick Douglass, an African American abolitionist and supporter of women's rights, Lucretia Mott, an abolitionist and fellow member of the women's suffrage movement, Elizabeth Cady Stanton, author of The Declaration of Sentiments, and Lucy Stone.

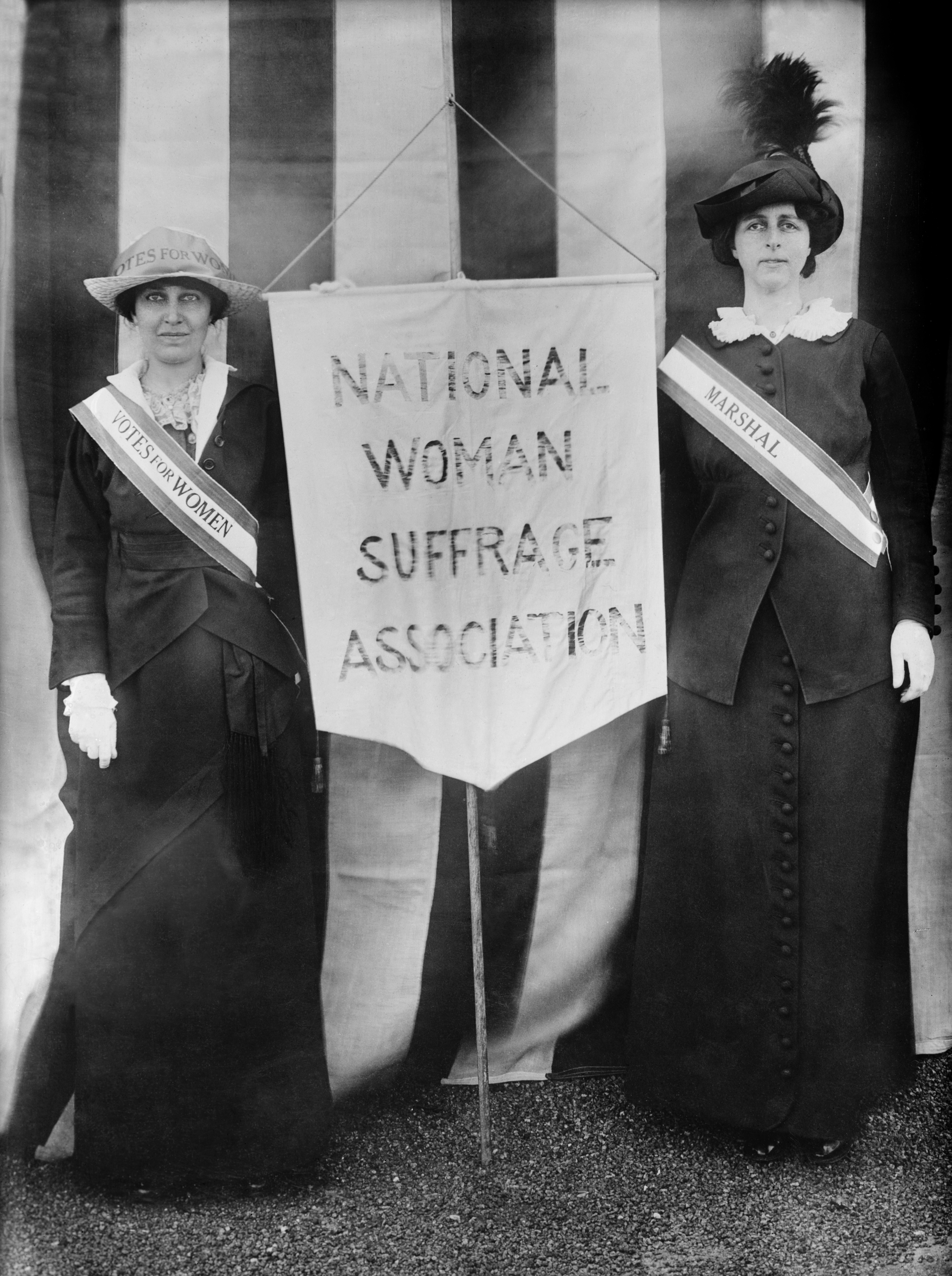
Suffragists Mrs. Stanley McCormick and Mrs. Charles Parker, April 22, 1913

Elizabeth Cady Stanton was the leader, along with Susan B. Anthony, of the National Woman Suffrage Association, which they had created in 1869. Lucy Stone, however, was the leader of the American Woman Suffrage Association, a rival association, also created in 1869. The main point of disagreement between the two associations was the Fifteenth Amendment. According to A. Lange (2015), the American Woman Suffrage Association "supported the Fifteenth Amendment that granted African American men the right to vote". On the contrary, the National Woman Suffrage Association opposed the Amendment, because they wanted women to be included in it. Despite this disagreement, in 1890, the two associations merged to form the National American Woman Suffrage Association.

In 1905, Mary Anna Cooke Thompson went to the 37th Annual Convention of the National American Woman Suffrage Association, which was held in Portland, Oregon, in the First Congregational Church, from June 28 to July 5, 1905. The convention was presided over by Susan B. Anthony and Abigail Scott Duniway was also present. As we can see on the Convention Program, available in the Digital Collections of Lewis & Clark College, Mary Thompson participated in the Convention on Thursday, June 28, in the afternoon, and was representing the Woman's Henry George League. Indeed, she was also in favor of political and economic change and supported the progressive vision of Henry George, an American journalist and economist advocating for the single tax.

== Later years ==
In her later years, was known, thanks to her journal and personal introspective passages, that she had a difficult domestic relationship with her husband and struggles with mental health that she feared would limit her work. Ward (2012) cites Mary Anna Cooke Thompson's journal: "The same terrible depression comes over me from this letter that affected me before I left home" and "may the loved ones who watch over me guide and direct me into the right paths, and may my judgement be quickened that I may accomplish the work that is for me to do". Thompson was pleased with the proceedings and her role. "I represented 'The Pacific Slope and the Claims of the Working class'," she wrote in her journal.

== Beliefs and tendencies ==
Thompson's work for equal rights was grounded in her belief in the moral superiority of women, paired with faith in the ballot as an essential and powerful weapon to stop corruption. Thompson claimed that "women were the conscience of the nation".

She believed that the influence of women would purify the laws of the land and it would effectively address the social and economic issues that the nation faced. Thompson's rhetorical exigence for woman suffrage was based on both, justice, recognizing the right of women to exercise the political power of the ballot, and expediency arguments, claiming that society as a whole would benefit from the exertion of women's moral influence through suffrage.

Intellectually, Thompson combined a traditional and progressive way of thinking, and aside from what might be refuted today as the myth of women's innate moral superiority over men, her defense of women's rights was in accord with the beliefs of most women and men of her time.
