= Catherine Amanda Coburn =

American journalist

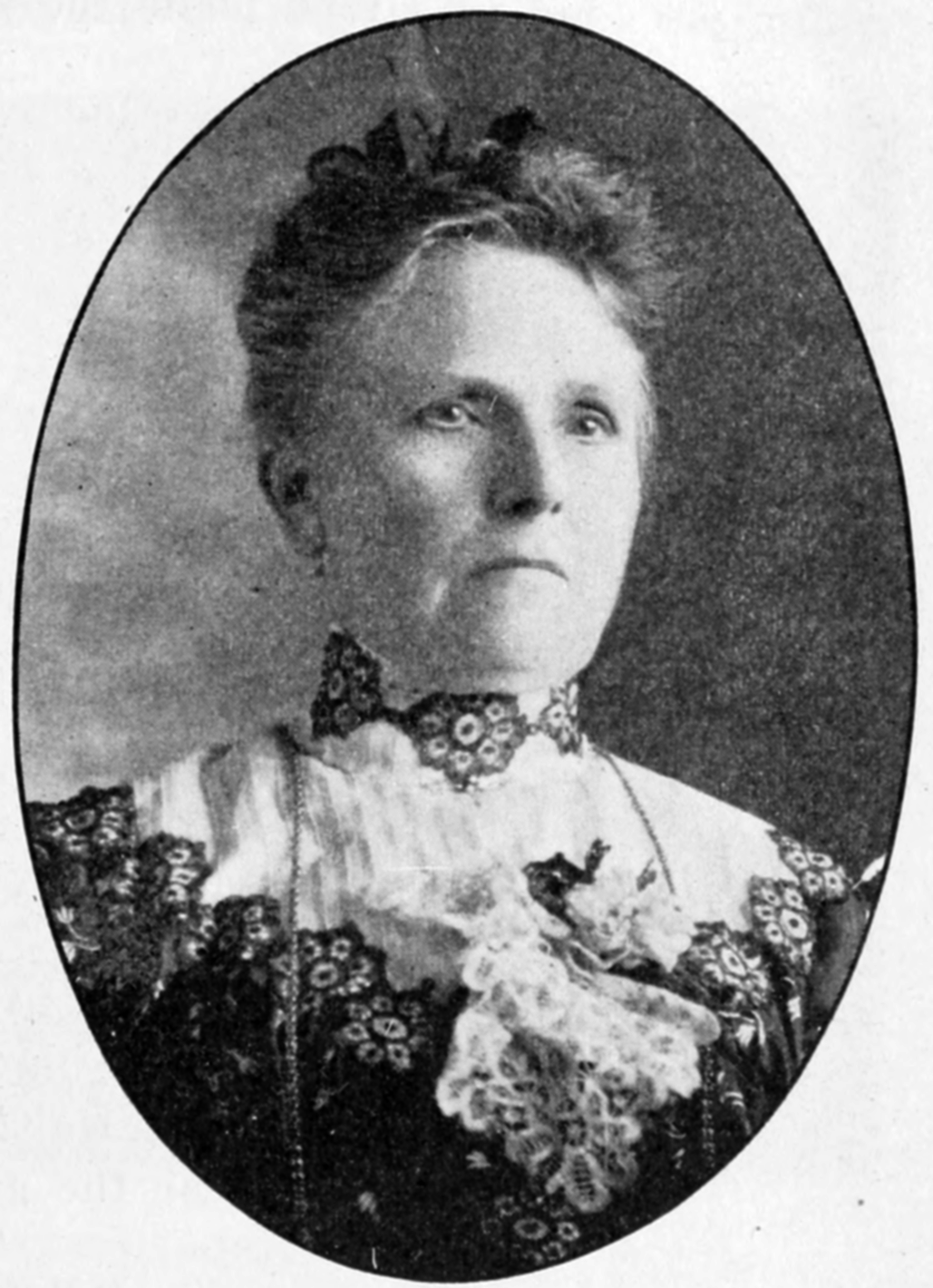
- Born: Catherine Amanda Scott; November 30, 1839; Groveland, Illinois, U.S.
- Died: May 27, 1913 (aged 73); Portland, Oregon, U.S.
- Resting place: River View Cemetery, Portland
- Other names: Kate; Kit
- Occupations: teacher; school principal; journalist; newspaper editor
- Spouse: John Read Coburn (m. 1857; died 1868)
- Children: 4
- Relatives: Abigail Scott Duniway (sister); Harvey W. Scott (brother); Leslie M. Scott (nephew)
- Writing career
- Language: English

Catherine Amanda Coburn (née, Scott; November 30, 1839 – May 27, 1913) was an American pioneer of the long nineteenth century associated with the Oregon Territory. Entering the workforce after the untimely death of her husband, she became a teacher and school principal and, later, a newspaper editor. A century after her birth, she and her elder sister were described by an Oregon historian as "probably Oregon's two greatest women journalists." Coburn was active in civic life, especially in her later years. Though she did not identify as a "suffragette", she did actively support the cause of women's suffrage, among various charitable and civic causes.

== Early life ==
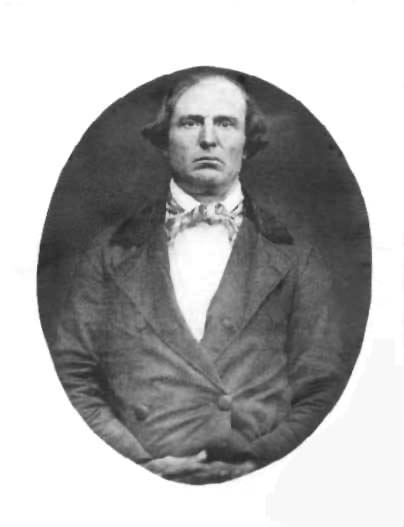
John Tucker Scott

Catherine (nicknames, "Kate" or "Kit") Amanda Scott was born in Groveland, Illinois, November 30, 1839. Her parents were John Tucker Scott (1809–1880), originally of Washington County, Kentucky, and Ann Roelofson Scott (1811–1852), originally of Henderson County, Kentucky. She had eight siblings: James, Mary, Abigail, Margaret, Harvey, Harriet, John, Edward, Sarah, William, and Alice. She also had two half-siblings, Ellen and Ward.

On April 1, 1852, the Scott family, along with several others, started for the Oregon Territory, taking the Oregon Trail with a caravan of ox teams. The journey took six months. Ann died on June 20, 1852, when they were in the Black Hills, at a point in the trail about 70 miles (110 km) north of the present city of Cheyenne, Wyoming. She had been sick for only a few hours with what was known as 'plains cholera.' Her husband and nine children, aged from three years and six months to nineteen years, were with her in a shelter tent when she died. Amanda's brother "Willie" also died on the Oregon Trail.). Abigail, then seventeen years old, kept a journal during the family's trip west. In later years, Abigail, Harvey, and Kate would go on to share an affinity for the newspaper trade.

== Career ==
In 1857, Catherine married John Read Coburn (1830–1868). The two built a house in Canemah and had four daughters: Agnes, Ada, Camilla, and Kate. Upon John's death in 1868, Catherine became a schoolteacher at Canemah. According to her later account, she was denied her requested salary of US$50 per month, on the basis that the school could "get a man" to teach for that amount. She accepted a salary of $40 per month, continuing in the position for four years, but carried a "rankling sense of injustice." She described the incident as her "first lesson in equal rights." She then became principal of the Forest Grove school, a position she held for two years.

In 1874, and for the next five years, Coburn began her career in journalism as associate editor with her sister, Abigail Scott Duniway, editor and publisher of the New Northwest. Coburn evinced a rare degree of journalistic ability. Beginning in 1879, she served for five years as editor in chief of the Portland Daily Bee. In the 1880s, Coburn served as associate editor of the Evening Telegram for at least five years, through a period of numerous changes in leadership.

In 1888, she transferred to the editorial staff of the Oregonian, which owned the Telegram. She contributed over the ensuing quarter-century to the daily, weekly, and Sunday editions of the newspaper. Her ability to cover local incidents and interests in editorial comment was credited to her personal connection with the pioneer experience. She remained with the Oregonian as an associate editor until her death in 1913. Among her accomplishments as an editorial writer, she was known for "tender tributes to pioneer builders of the Pacific Northwest."

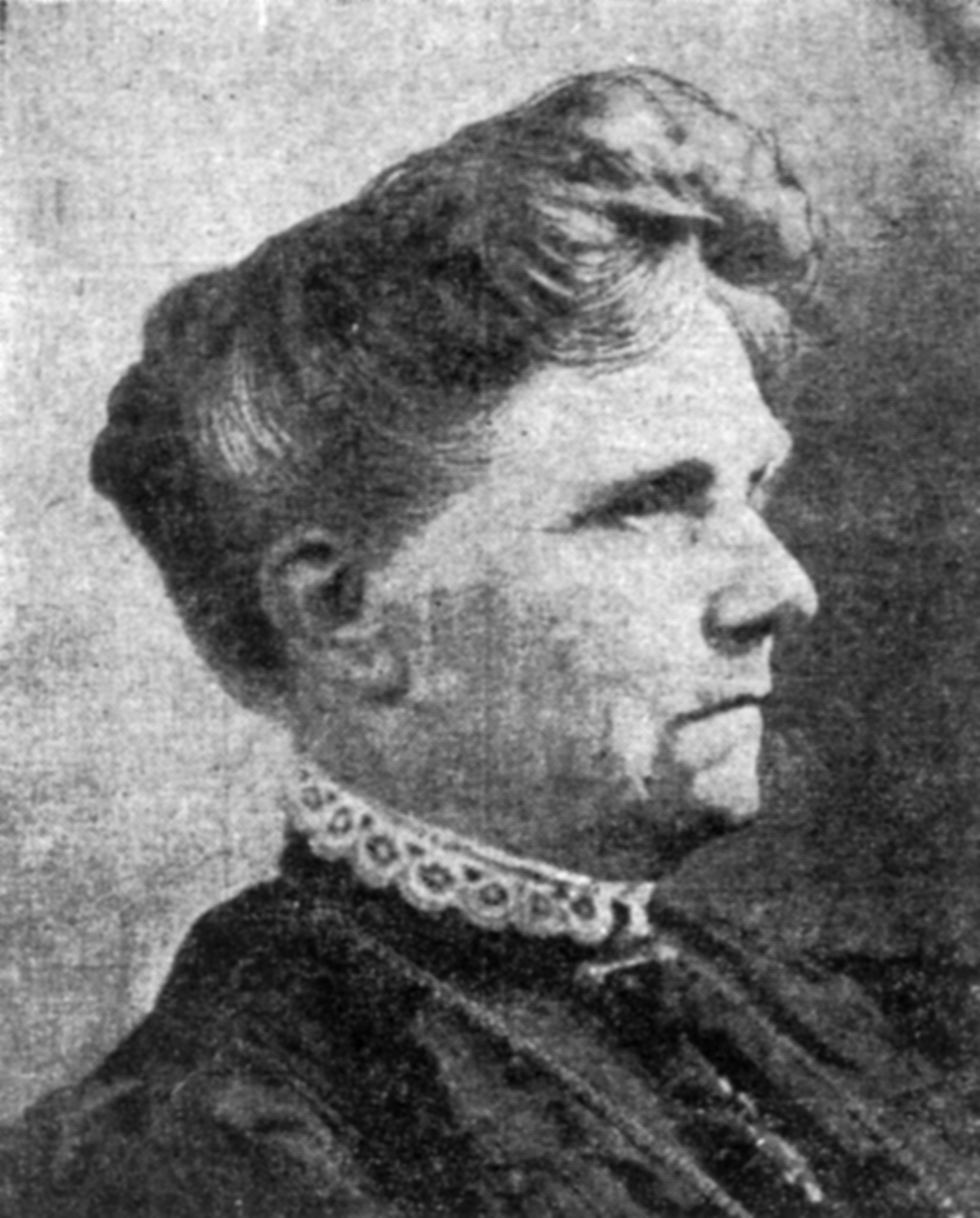
Coburn in later years

== Later life ==
Coburn was active in civic affairs, especially later in life. She was president of the Allen Preparatory School in Portland, founded in 1901 and incorporated in 1905. She was a member of the Oregon Pioneer Association and a charter member of the Portland Woman's Union, which she represented in bringing a complaint about a Portland schoolteacher. Coburn was elected president of the Woman's Union in 1906. When her sister Abigail brought national woman suffrage leader Susan B. Anthony to Portland's Lewis and Clark Centennial Exposition, Catherine was among those in the receiving line at her speech. Coburn disavowed the term "suffragette," but supported women's suffrage.

== Death ==
She died, following a long illness, in Portland, on May 27, 1913, (Note: Oregon Historical Society (1940) records date of death as May 28.) Leslie M. Scott, her nephew and fellow journalist, praised her career in an obituary; she was buried in that city's River View Cemetery. She left an estate valued at US$14,000 to her daughter Ada and to the children of Agnes and Camilla. George Turnbull, historian of Oregon newspapers, described Catherine and Abigail in 1939 as "probably Oregon's two greatest women journalists.
