= Lucie Fulton Isaacs =

American suffragist

- Born: Lucinda Fulton; January 18, 1841 near St. Joseph, Missouri, US.
- Died: November 20, 1916 (aged 75); Walla Walla, Washington, US.
- Education: Portland Academy
- Occupations: non-fiction writer; philanthropist; suffragist
- Organization: Oregon Pioneer Association
- Spouse: Henry Perry Isaacs (m. 1860; died 1900)

Lucie Isaacs (née Lucinda Fulton; January 18, 1841 – November 20, 1916) was an American writer, philanthropist, and pioneer suffragist. As a writer of essays and descriptive articles, she was known to early readers of the Overland magazine and other western periodicals under various pen names, suffering from shyness that made her shrink from publicity. She was a co-organizer of the first woman's club in Walla Walla, Washington, a member of the Oregon Pioneer Association, and a supporter of the arts. Isaacs served as president of Walla Walla's suffrage association, lived to see full suffrage given to women and voted before her death in Walla Walla in November 1916.

== Early life and education ==
Lucinda Fulton was born near St. Joseph, Missouri on January 18, 1841, a daughter of Col. James C. Fulton (1816–1890) and Priscilla Wells Fulton (1816–1902). She traced her ancestry back to one of the three brothers Fulton, Scottish-Irish Protestants who came to Lancaster County, Pennsylvania, in 1755. Through the maternal line, she was descended from the Wellses of Virginia, who came from Wales about 1760, from the Kuykendalls of Pennsylvania, originally from Holland, and from the Deans, who were natives of Denmark. Lucinda had eight younger siblings: Elizabeth, Mary, James, Amanda, John, David, Charles, and Annie.

Isaacs crossed the Great Plains in an emigrant wagon train that left St. Joseph, Missouri in April 1847, and reached the Willamette Valley via the Oregon Trail and the Barlow Road. Isaacs arrived at her father's Donation Land Claim near Lafayette, Yamhill County, Oregon in September. During the long, hot summer, as the covered wagons wound their way across the prairies, Isaacs often rode with her father mounted on her mother's mare, "Zilpha".

James Fulton took up his 640 acres (260 ha) in Yamhill County, Oregon Territory, and built a log cabin. In November, there was fright for a few days over exaggerated stories of the Whitman massacre and the fear that there would be raids into the Valley, but nothing happened.

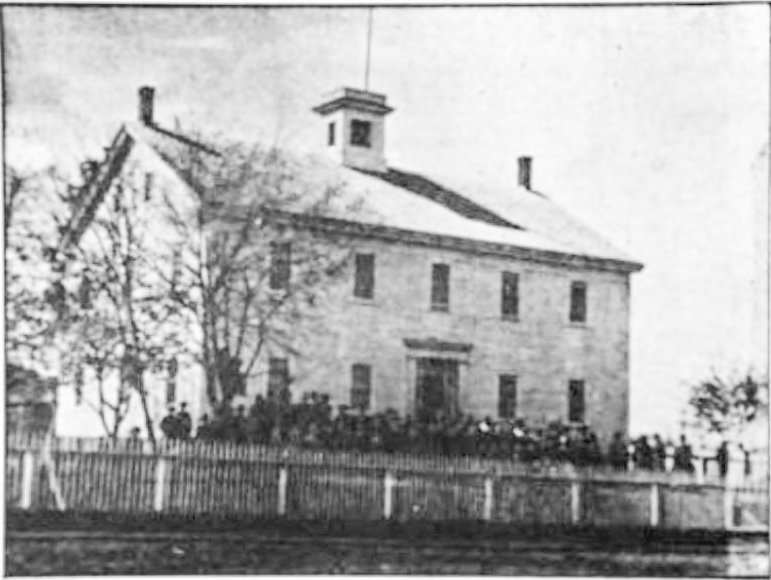
Portland Academy (1865)

It was in the traditional log cabin schoolhouse of Yamhill that Isaacs received the beginnings of her education, riding 3 miles (4.8 km) through the woods each morning, with her brother Jamie and other neighborhood children. On Sundays they went in the family carryall to church in the same schoolhouse, where there was a sermon in the morning and another in the afternoon with a basket luncheon. In between, the children were expected to sit quietly through hours of scripture reading. As a young woman, Isaacs was a student at the Portland Academy, the first higher institution of learning in that place.

As a child, Isaacs showed a passionate fondness for poetry and began to treasure every scrap available. In those days of few books except the Bible, Shakespeare and Josephus' history, The Jewish War, and fewer magazines (such as Godey's Lady's Book ), and with just the beginnings of modern journalism on the Pacific coast, Isaacs found little enough until she received the first copies of the new Harper's Magazine, late in the 1850s, reveling in the "easy chair" essays of George William Curtis. It opened a new world to her and presented to her a higher idea for humanity than she had ever before envisioned.

Her father, unfortunately was "not sure it was well for a woman to read too much". This was not from pure prejudice. It was still generally believed that "strong mindedness" in women went along with short hair and moral abandon. Coming into the house, her father would take the magazine gently from her hands with the admonition that she "would better be helping mother". There was, too, the usual embargo encountered by talent in those days of few books and "sparse leavening". Isaacs gradually expanded her own innate talent and became known as a writer of essays and descriptive articles for such magazines as the Overland, edited by Bret Harte. In 1855, the family moved to The Dalles, Oregon.

== Career ==
At The Dalles, on May 16, 1860, she married Henry Perry Isaacs (1822–1900). Born in Philadelphia, he was a son of Joshua Isaacs, a native of England, and Elizabeth Stuart Perry, of Scotch descent from Derry, Ireland.

In 1863, the family moved to Philadelphia, where Mr. Isaacs's early business was in wholesale stationery. He opened up for his wife the opportunities for culture and self-improvement that had been denied her in her parental Pacific Northwest home.

After two years, they came to Walla Walla, Washington, where Mr. Isaacs took up a homestead, which later became part of the city. Their home, "Brookside", was built in 1867 and here, for 50 years, Mrs. Isaacs made her home.

In Walla Walla, Mr. Isaacs was a merchant and manufacturer of flour. He had imported from Switzerland the first of the modern mill machinery used in his business. He planted experimental orchards and vineyards to test the best varieties for the climate and introduced the most productive wheat seed to the farmers of that region. He held progressive views and he urged the farmers to adopt upland-dry-farming long before it was considered practical. He was also an amateur musician, playing the violin from the age of 12 until he was 75. His diverse interests, his intellect, and his sympathies with the feminist cause encouraged his wife in her aspirations.

As Mrs. Isaacs became older, she developed many new ideals—all clearly indicated by her early reading, her pronounced literary instincts and her devotion to the welfare and betterment of women. In Walla Walla, she was a pronounced leader in civic improvement. With five women coadjutors, she secured the institution and appointment of a woman probation officer for that city, credit being due to Isaacs for the idea of the Salvation Army captain serving in that role. She was active in securing the installation of the first street drinking fountains. She was prime mover in the city library and president of the Walla Walla Woman's Exchange. Her activities were always diversified and her interest intelligently applied by striking at the most acute of the city's needs at the proper time to bring them to prompt adoption.

Isaacs was a charter member of the first women's club in Walla Walla organized in 1886; was one of the first dozen in all the U.S. She was a prominent worker in the Symphony Orchestra Club, belonging also to the Sunshine and Educational Clubs.

Isaacs took a prominent part in the first equal suffrage movement in Washington Territory days. Under the guidance of Abigail Scott Duniway of Portland, Oregon, a lifelong friend and coworker, Isaacs was instrumental in securing from Congress a "head" for the "headless" Suffrage bill passed by the Legislature of the Washington Territory in 1885, later declared unconstitutional by Judge George Turner. Isaacs served as president of the Walla Walla Woman's Suffrage Club at a time when such clubs were not at all popular in general opinion. Their home, "Brookside", was referred to frequently as "the cradle of equal suffrage in Washington". In her suffrage activities, Isaacs was backed by her husband who, as a member of the state legislature, in 1886, introduced a woman's suffrage measure into the House. During the campaign of 1910, she was an officer of the Washington State Suffrage Association in charge of Letter Writers.

None of her poetry was ever published, but some essays and historical sketches were printed in The Pacific Monthly, Overland, and other periodicals under various pen names, while her correspondence was extensive as historian and letter writer for some years for the Washington Equal Suffrage Association, and the National Council of Women Voters.

== Personal life ==
Isaacs was one of the organizers of the Unitarian Church in Walla Walla in 1877. Later, she became a Christian Scientist, believing it a natural sequence from Unitarianism.

The Isaacs had eight children: Elizabeth, Harry, an unnamed infant, Grace, Charlotte, Edwin, Walter, and John.

Lucie Fulton Isaacs died in Walla Walla, Washington on November 20, 1916.

== See also ==
- Women's suffrage movement in Washington (state)
