= Georgiana Burton Pittock =

Founder of Portland Rose Society

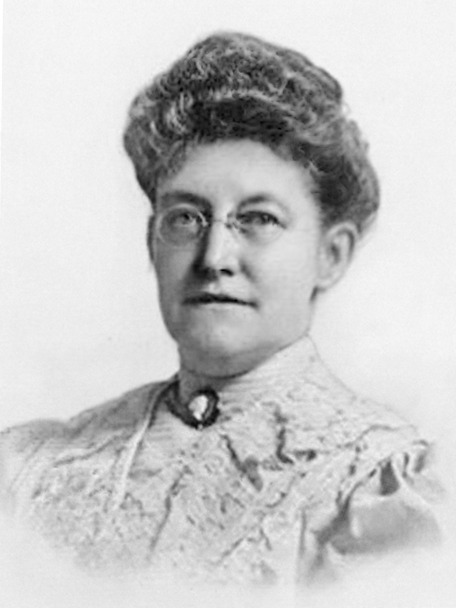
- Pittock, circa 1900
- Born: Georgiana Martin Burton; November 14, 1843; Clark County, Missouri
- Died: June 12, 1918 (aged 74); Portland, Oregon, U.S.
- Spouse: Henry Pittock (m. 1860)
- Children: 9 (6 surviving)

Georgiana Martin Pittock (née Burton; November 14, 1843 – June 12, 1918) was an Oregon pioneer and community leader based in Portland, Oregon. She founded the Portland Rose Society in 1888. The society's annual rose show grew into a rose parade and pageant by 1906, and was the foundation for the Portland Rose Festival. Pittock was actively involved in charities and cultural organizations in Portland from the 1870s through the early 1900s.

== Early life ==
Georgiana Martin Burton was born in Clark County, Missouri to Elwood Morgan Burton and Rhoda Ann (Hall) Burton, Georgiana Burton lived in Keokuk, Iowa, before traveling with her parents and two sisters on the Oregon Trail in 1854, from Missouri to the Oregon Territory. According to Burton family lore, young Georgiana was picked up by local Native Americans, when she became separated from her party while crossing the plains. She was returned to her family along with an offer to purchase the girl, which the family declined. The family continued on to Oregon without further mishap. When they reached Oregon, the family initially settled in Milwaukie, Oregon before moving to Portland in 1857. Pittock attended Portland Academy.

At fourteen, Pittock became engaged to Henry Pittock, a 26-year-old typesetter for The Weekly Oregonian. The young couple married in June 1860. Henry became the owner and publisher of the newspaper during this time period. Between 1861 and 1878, Georgiana gave birth to nine children, six of whom reached adulthood. The couple built homes on a large parcel of land that Henry had purchased in 1856, in an area that is now called the Pittock Block in downtown Portland. The family built and lived in two cottages before moving into a larger home in 1864, a home the family would live in for the next fifty years.

== Community involvement ==
=== Portland Rose Society ===
Pittock founded the Portland Rose Society as an informal club of rose gardeners in 1888, and is considered the founder of the Portland Rose Festival. The first rose competition was hosted by Pittock in her large garden in Portland. She established the gardening club after a holiday of touring rose gardens and rose competitions in England. The next year, Pittock turned her backyard rose competition into a fundraiser for her church. She added a judging tent to her garden and charged admission to the event.

This annual event would later include a city parade. Local gardeners would empty their gardens of roses to decorate horses, floats and wagons. From these early beginnings, the Portland Rose Festival was born. The group officially established the Portland Rose Society, the oldest rose society in the United States as a formal gardening organization in 1907, and established the annual tradition of a judged, flower competition.

=== Charities ===
Pittock was actively involved with local women's and children's organizations. She founded the Ladies Sewing Society in 1887, which eventually became the Women's Relief Society. Members would sew baby clothes and sell them at local events to raise money to support other charities in town. Pittock's favorite charity was The Baby Home, a Portland orphanage for abandoned babies. She supported the Boys and Girls Aid Society, a home for abandoned and abused children. She was also involved in the Parry Center for Children, which began as a home for children orphaned on the Oregon Trail. She was actively involved with the Fruit and Flower Daycare Center, the first daycare center in Oregon, which opened in 1906, and is still in operation today.

Pittock joined the Portland Women's Union in 1912 as a suffragette. The organization's mission was to support single working women. Pittock was a board member, chairman of the finance committee and the fourth president of the organization. She was also instrumental in establishing the Martha Washington Hotel, a hotel residence for single working women. By 1911, the hotel had more demand for rooms than the building could provide, and a new hotel was built.

== Later years ==
In 1909, Pittock and her husband, Henry, hired architect Edward T. Foulkes to design a 16,000-square-foot, French-Renaissance style mansion for the couple and their extended family on their 46-acre estate. The wooded property was in the West Hills area of Portland known as Imperial Heights. The home was built 1,000 feet above sea level, with commanding views of Mount St. Helens and Mount Hood. Oregon craftsmen and artisans were hired to construct the home, mainly using materials from the Pacific Northwest. Construction was begun in 1909 and completed in 1914.

Pittock suffered a stroke that left her partially paralyzed in 1913. An elevator was hastily added to the construction plans, so that Pittock could move easily around the large mansion. Four years later, on June 12, 1918, Pittock died from complications of the earlier stroke. Her husband, Henry, survived her by only a few months, dying in January, 1919. They are both buried in River View Cemetery in Portland. Pittock family members continued to live in the mansion until 1958.

The mansion was badly damaged during a storm in 1962, and was eventually abandoned. Scheduled to be demolished by developers, the home was purchased by the City of Portland in 1964. Today, the Pittock Mansion is open to the public.

== Bibliography ==
- Wilson, Janet L. (2014). The Queen of Portland's Roses: The Life of Georgiana Burton Pittock. Lake Oswego, Oregon: Panoply Press. ISBN 978-1882877447.
