= Will H. Daly =

Will H. Daly (May 25, 1869 – March 23, 1924) was a Portland, Oregon, labor leader, progressive politician and businessman. He was the first person to head both the Oregon State Federation of Labor and the Central Labor Council of Portland. He was also the first labor leader to serve on the Portland City Council, but was unsuccessful in a mayoral bid, largely due to a vigorous campaign to discredit him by The Oregonian, the city's largest newspaper. He was active in the People's Power League. Daly was also a supporter of the single tax schemes advocated by followers of the popular political economist Henry George.

== Early life ==
Daly was born on May 25, 1869, in Springfield, Illinois to Patrick and Lucy Daly, a working-class couple. His father died when he was only eight, and two years later he began his working career in the printing business, earning his journeyman's card by age 17, and by 31 had worked his way up to the plant foreman's position at the Springfield Leader-Democrat, one of the two major daily newspapers in the city at the time.

After the death of his mother in 1901, Daly and wife, the former Daisy Flannery, whom he had married in 1892, moved west to Oregon. They stayed briefly in Salem, then settled in Portland where he took a position with the Oregonian. In 1907, he left the paper to work for the Portland Linotype, where he remained until 1911.

== Labor, politics and business success ==
Throughout his career, he had been active in progressive politics and organized labor, gaining election to both the Portland printer's local and the Oregon State Federation of Labor in 1908. His hard-line leftist views were evident in a speech he gave at a labor parade in 1909 introducing socialist "Big Bill" Haywood, denouncing a "great clamor from all quarters that the labor unions should be purged of the radical element." His strong stand for labor and political radicalism earned him growing support among the rank and file of Portland working people, and eventually some small business operators, but his socialist ties would yield adverse impact on his later political ambitions.

In 1911, with the solid backing of the middle class residents of Portland's growing east side, Daly won election to the Portland City Council, becoming the first union official to serve in that capacity. He opened his own business, the Portland Monotype Company, the same year, and soon saw his income nearly triple from his previous US$35 per week wages. Despite his business success, he remained loyal to the causes of populist democracy and the interests of working people.

=== Power begets controversy and enemies ===
At first greeted on the council as a successful member of the business community, Daly soon found he had enemies among Portland's establishment, most notably his former employer, the Oregonian. Yale University historian, Robert D. Johnston, describes the newspaper's view of him as that of "devil incarnate," by the midpoint of his term on the council, opposing what they termed his "socialistic plans and rosy dreams," an ironic turn of phrase given the city's nickname, the City of Roses.

A characteristic battle between Daly and the paper involved the rising number of operators of illegal taxi operations running competition with the Portland Railway, Light and Power Company's monopoly on transportation within the city. The Oregonian viewed the situation as a threat to an established business providing an essential community service by opportunistic upstarts engaging in unfair competition, while Daly defended the jitneys, whose owners had organized a union to defend their interests, as American individual ingenuity and collective organizing at its best. "It is said that jitney competition is unfair," Daly's argument ran. "Where has there ever been competition that is fair? Competition means the survival of the fittest; there is nothing fair about it."

The battle between Daly and the newspaper became even more bitter when, as city council member, he discovered and thwarted a secret contract between the paper's owner and publisher, Henry Pittock, and the city for a water line to be run to his new residence, now known as the Pittock Mansion. The insider deal called for the expensive project to be constructed entirely at city expense, despite the fact that the mansion was located a half mile outside the city limits at the time. The contract was cancelled, Pittock's public image tarnished, and he was reportedly enraged by the incident.

=== Mayoral campaign "skulduggery" ===
In 1917, Daly became a Republican mayoral candidate against fellow councilman, George Luis Baker, a flamboyant character who had made his fortune as a theater operator, and was widely regarded as having more interest in shameless self-promotion than the people's business. Daly was expected to win by a landslide, but the Oregonian began a daily crusade to discredit him. Only days before the election, there was a burglary of Daly's home, during which nothing of value was taken, but his personal files and papers were ransacked.

In that Sunday's editions, The Oregonian prominently published the only missing document, a 1910 application for Socialist Party membership. The election coming just a few months after the Bolshevik Revolution, the revelation and the Oregonian's characterization of it as evidence of Daly's unpatriotic and dangerous radicalism was enough to alarm a substantial number of the city's voters. The protestations of the rival paper, the Oregon Journal, that Daly's dalliance with the socialists had been brief and in understandable disgust toward policies of reactionary control by the established parties, were not enough to reverse the change in Daly's standing in the community. Daly was in fact a supporter of Georgist policies for Portland. Nonetheless, he lost by a margin of only one percent of the vote, a testament both to his popularity, and the progressivism of the city's population at that time.

== Later life ==
His reputation forever sullied by the adverse publicity of the mayoral campaign, Daly never returned to public life. He lived out the remainder of his life managing his business, and died on March 23, 1924, at the age of 54.
