= Sons and Daughters of Oregon Pioneers =

Association of direct descendants of Oregon Pioneers

The Sons and Daughters of Oregon Pioneers (SDOP) is a nonprofit pioneer heritage association located in Portland, Oregon, United States. The SDOP was organized and incorporated on June 13, 1901 by the children of the elderly members of the Oregon Pioneer Association to memorialize the pioneers who arrived and settled in the early Oregon Country, Oregon Territory or Washington Territories prior to Oregon attaining statehood on February 14, 1859.

== Purpose ==
The mission of the SDOP is to assist the descendants of the Oregon pioneers and interested historians in memorializing those who founded the civil and military governments of Oregon and Washington, and those who pioneered the basic industries of those states. The group does this by helping preserve and restore historic pioneer-related sites in Washington and Oregon.

The SDOP hosts an annual picnic at Champoeg State Park, which was the location of the territory's first provisional government. It also hosts an annual selection of Miss Oregon Pioneer and an annual statehood banquet as well as other events throughout the year. The group also assists in genealogical research.

== Membership ==
All direct-line descendants of pioneers who arrived and settled in the Oregon Country, Oregon Territory, or Washington Territory prior to Oregon statehood, February 14, 1859, are eligible for membership. There are more than 1200 members worldwide.

== Miss Oregon Pioneer Queens ==
- 2005 - Megan Renee Cozzetti (Ohlson)
- 2009 - Ellynn Ackerlund
