= Telegram Building =

Historic building in Portland, Oregon, U.S.

- U.S. National Register of Historic Places
- Portland Historic Landmark
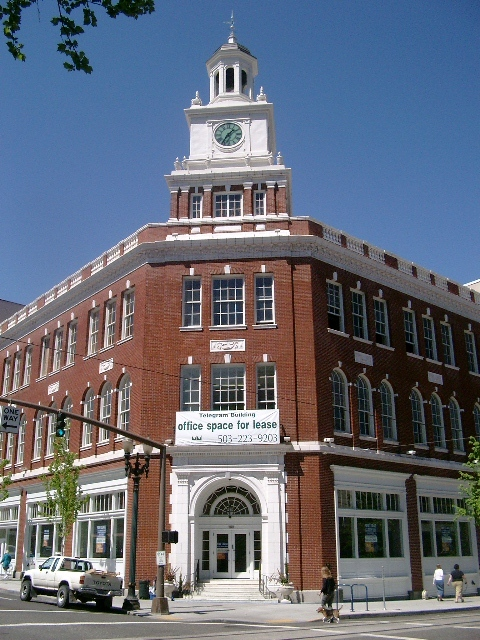
- View of clock tower and main entry in 2009

- Location within Portland, Oregon Location within Oregon Location within the United States
- Location: 1101–1117 SW Washington Street; Portland, Oregon
- Coordinates: 45°31′19″N 122°40′57″W
- Built: 1922
- Architect: Rassmussen Grace Company
- Architectural style: Colonial Revival
- NRHP reference No.: 93001560
- Added to NRHP: 1994

The Telegram Building is a historic building in Portland, Oregon. It was constructed in 1922, several years after The Evening Telegram newspaper had been purchased by John E. and L. R. Wheeler. The Telegram was a newspaper founded in 1877 by Henry L. Pittock; it merged in 1931 with the Portland News, creating the Portland News-Telegram, which ceased publishing in 1939.

== Architecture ==
The red brick and terra-cotta structure culminates in a colonial-style clock tower.

A major renovation was completed in 2004, renovating the building to accommodate multi-tenant office space. The renovation added two floors of underground parking, office space upstairs, and a penthouse (also office space) behind the clock tower. The Telegram Building was placed on the National Register of Historic Places in 1994.

== See also ==
- National Register of Historic Places listings in Southwest Portland, Oregon
