= Portland Daily Bulletin =

- Type: Daily newspaper
- Owner(s): Ben Holladay
- Editor: James O'Meara, Harvey W. Scott, T. B. Odeneal
- Founded: 1870
- Language: English
- Ceased publication: 1882
- City: Portland, Oregon

The Portland Daily Bulletin was a newspaper launched in 1870 in Portland, Oregon, United States. Railroad promoter Ben Holladay launched the newspaper, one of several efforts to challenge The Oregonian's position as Portland's dominant newspaper, as part of his effort to promote his railroad interests. The paper lasted little more than five years, and was regarded as a failure.

Holladay appointed James O'Meara as editor. Harvey W. Scott, renowned longtime editor of The Oregonian, became editor of the Bulletin in 1873. Scott was succeeded by T. B. Odeneal. Holladay ceased publication in 1875, claiming that he had lost nearly $200,000 on it.

The Bulletin published morning, evening, and weekly editions, and claimed to be the first newspaper in the western United States to do so. It typically carried eight columns on four pages. It covered the launch of Portland's streetcar system on December 9, 1872. Also in 1872, the paper conducted a campaign against the Portland Police Bureau, and was embarrassed when the police planted a hoax story about an alleged murder. Its contents and positions were the subject of commentary in other Oregon newspapers, and it was known for its adversarial relationship with The Oregonian.

Another paper, called the Evening Bulletin, appeared briefly in 1868, prior to the launch of the Daily Bulletin. It was not connected with Holladay's venture, and it was edited and published by J. F. Atkinson. Atkinson later bought an interest in the Portland Bee as it was declining in 1880. He renamed it the Portland Bulletin, and it continued until 1882.
