= Pittock Mansion =

Historic house museum in Portland, Oregon, U.S.

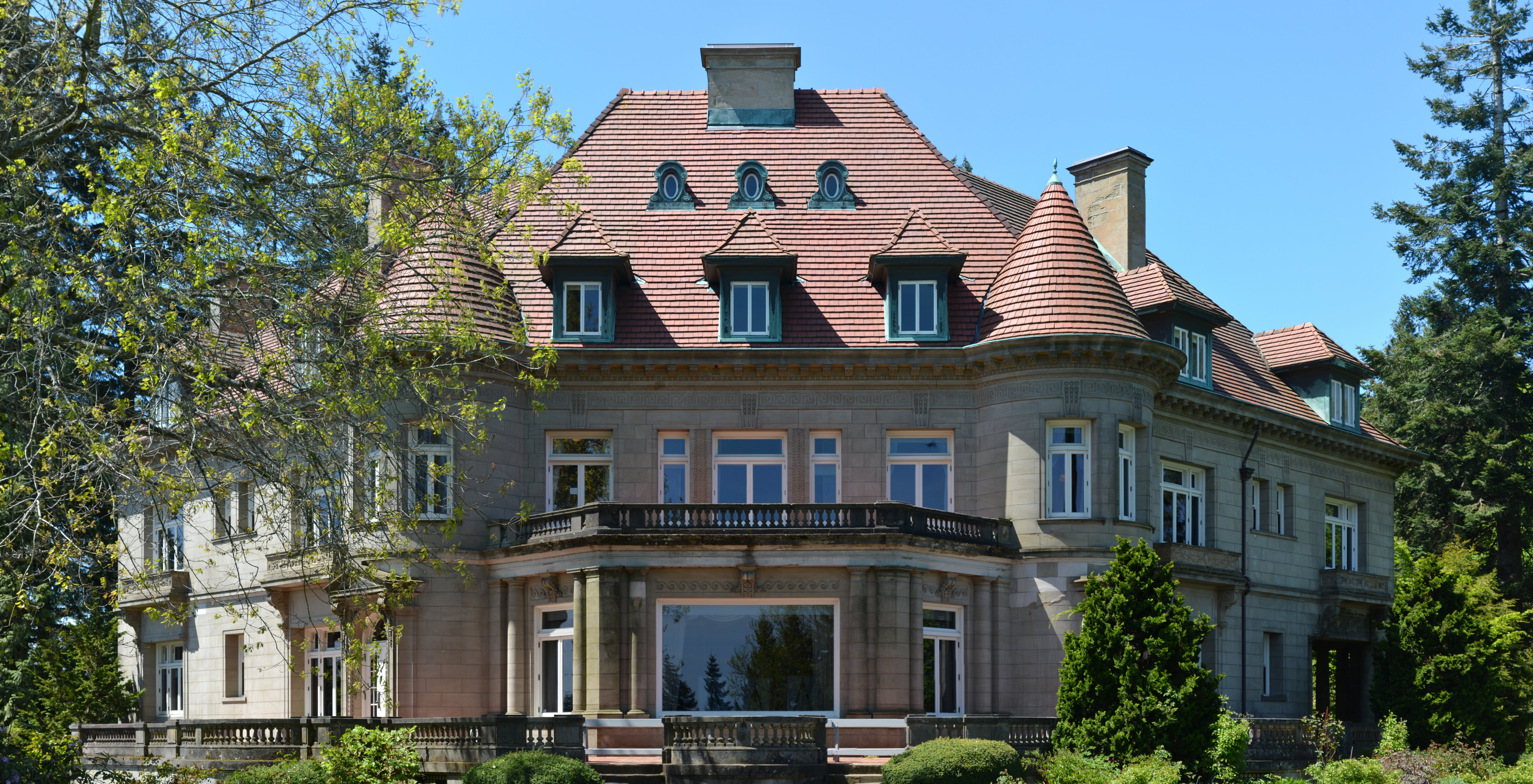
- The east façade

General information
- Architectural style: Renaissance
- Location: Portland, Oregon, U.S.
- Construction started: 1909; 117 years ago
- Completed: 1914; 112 years ago

Technical details
- Size: 16,000 square feet (1,500 m^{2})
- Grounds: 46 acres (19 ha)

Other information
- Number of rooms: 46
- Pittock Mansion
- U.S. National Register of Historic Places
- Location within Portland, Oregon
- Coordinates: 45°31′30″N 122°42′59″W
- Built: 1914; 112 years ago
- Architect: Edward T. Foulkes
- NRHP reference No.: 74001709
- Added to NRHP: November 21, 1974

The Pittock Mansion is a French Renaissance-style château in the West Hills of Portland, Oregon, United States. It was built in 1914 as a private home for London-born Oregonian publisher Henry Pittock and his wife, Georgiana Burton Pittock. It is a 46-room estate built of Tenino sandstone situated on 46 acres (19 ha) that is now owned by the city's Bureau of Parks and Recreation and open for touring.

Modeled after Beaux Arts and French Renaissance architecture, the mansion is situated on an expanse in the West Hills that provides panoramic views of Downtown Portland. It was added to the National Register of Historic Places in 1974.

== History ==
=== Construction and architecture ===
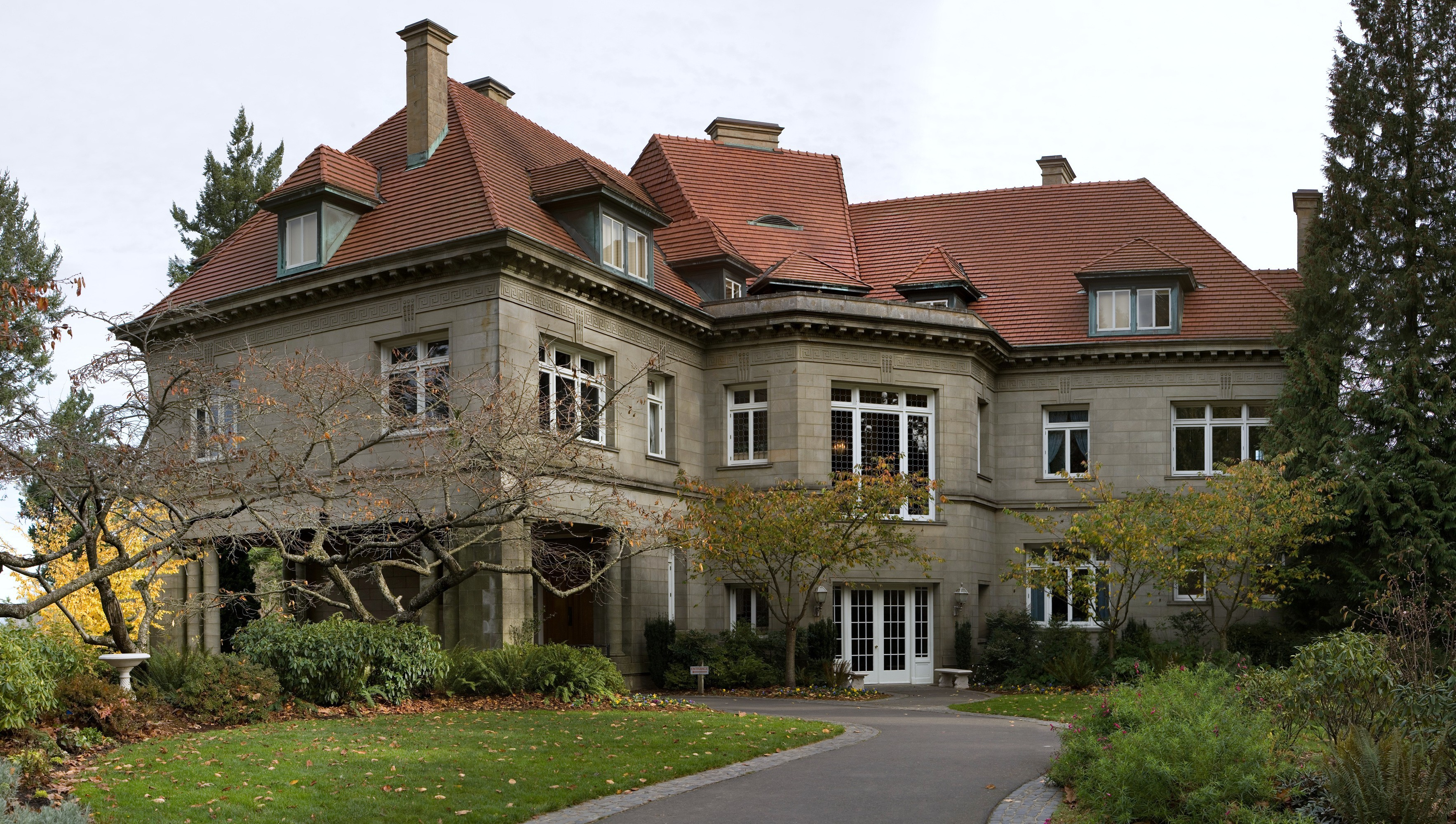
The mansion's west façade, location of the current main entrance. It was originally the rear of the house.

Pittock Mansion was constructed in 1909 by London-born publisher and business tycoon Henry Pittock as a private residence for himself and his wife, Georgiana. The house was designed by San Francisco architect Edward T. Foulkes. Construction began in 1909, though the house was not completed until 1914. Upon completion, the home featured such luxuries as a central vacuum system, intercoms, indirect lighting, an elevator, and a walk-in refrigerator. The interiors of the mansion were modeled on an eclectic collection of styles, including Jacobean, (the library) craftsman, (the dining room) Turkish, (the smoking room) and French Renaissance (the music room).

Georgiana Pittock was an avid gardener who was a founding member of the Portland Rose Society, hosted the first Portland Rose Show in 1889, and helped launch the Portland Rose Festival. Pittock Mansion is surrounded by formal gardens that reflect her passion for gardening. The lawn is hedged by heritage roses as a tribute to Georgiana's work.

==== Floor directory ====
- The lower level includes the boiler room & laundry room and is now a museum. As of October 2023, it houses a temporary special exhibition on Eliza Barchus.
- The first & second floors were the former living quarters of the Pittock family members, and are now part of the museum exhibits. They have been redecorated to resemble either the Pittocks' original living spaces, or those of similar 19th-century Oregon families.
- The third & fourth floors were the servants' former living quarters, and currently house the offices of the Pittock Mansion Society that oversees the museum’s operations. The upper floors are only accessible via a back room staircase and are closed to the public except during “Behind the Scenes” tours for an additional cost.

=== Political scandal; death of the Pittocks ===
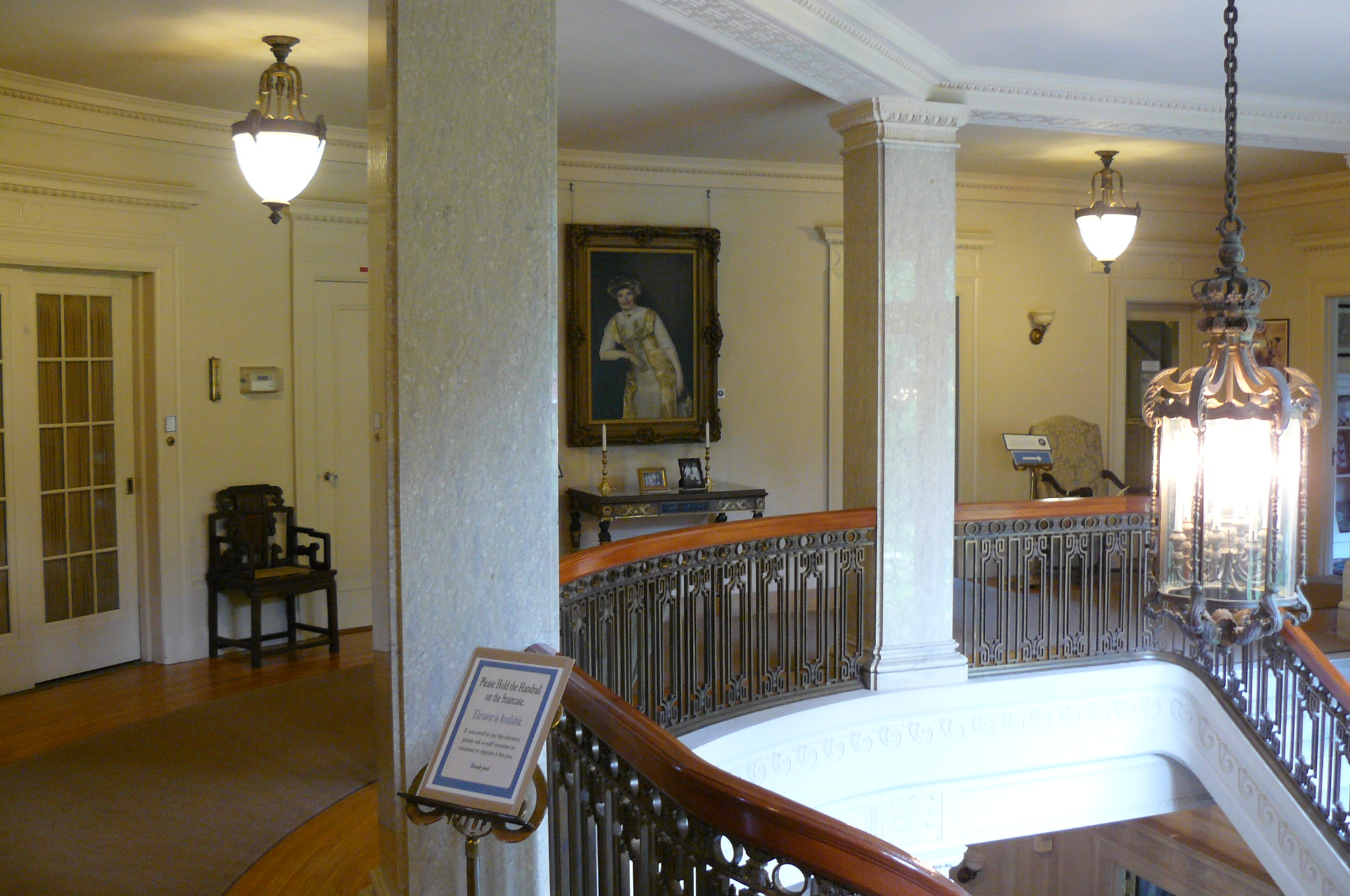
Interior of Pittock Mansion from central staircase

The home was at the center of a political scandal in 1911 when a Portland City Council member, Will H. Daly, brought public attention to Pittock having arranged for a water line to the construction project entirely at city expense, despite it being located a half mile outside of the city limits at the time. The incident contributed to a longstanding feud between Pittock's paper and Daly which ultimately led to the end of the councilman's political career.

Georgiana died in 1918 at the age of 72, and Henry in 1919 at 84. The Pittock family remained in residence at the mansion until 1958 when Eric Ladd, who had stayed in the mansion for four years, and Peter Gantenbein, a Pittock grandson who had been born in the house, put the estate on the market and were unsuccessful in selling it. Extensive damage caused by the Columbus Day Storm in 1962 caused the owners to consider demolishing the building. The community raised $75,000 in three months in order to help the city purchase the property. Seeing this popular support, and agreeing that the house had tremendous value as a unique historic resource, the City of Portland purchased the estate in 1964 for $225,000.

=== Restoration projects ===
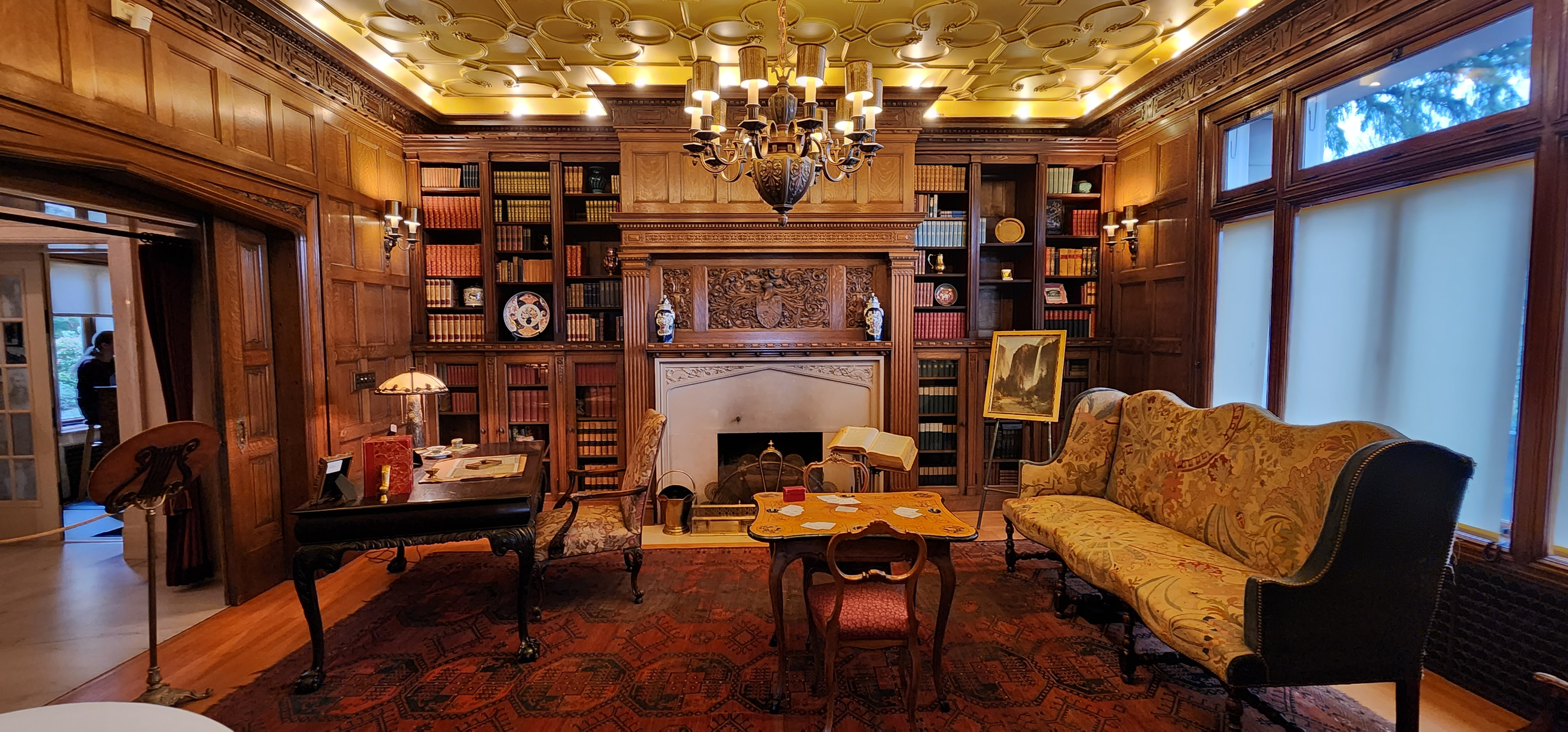
The library of Pittock Mansion

Fifteen months were spent restoring the building. It opened to the public in 1965 and has been a community landmark ever since. Roughly 80,000 people visit the Pittock Mansion each year. Due to the location of the site 1,000 feet (300 m) above sea level, the mansion is one of the best places for birdwatching in Portland. The building was added to the National Register of Historic Places in 1974.

In 2006, the City of Portland estimated that $6–8 million worth of restorations were needed for the mansion.

== Access ==
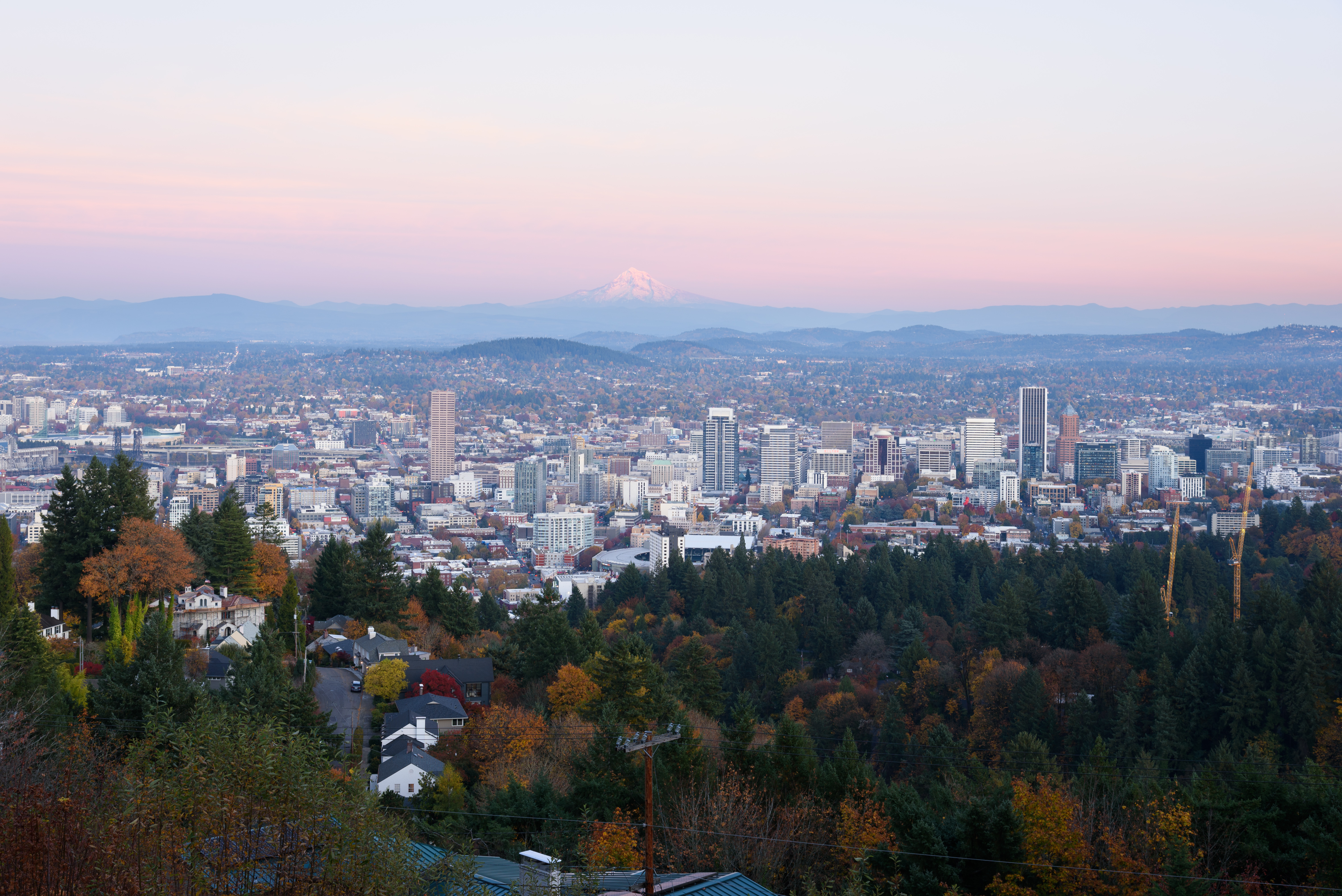
Vista of Portland from Pittock Mansion

Visitors can drive up to the mansion, located at 3229 NW Pittock Drive. The Wildwood Trail through Forest Park also crosses the mansion's parking area, allowing hikers to arrive at Pittock Mansion on foot.

== In popular media ==
The mansion made its first known appearance in the 1977 romance film First Love, starring Susan Dey and William Katt. The house was the main character's family home and had an important scene in this film.

The second appearance was in the 1982 slasher film Unhinged. The film has become infamous since its release due to being banned in various countries as a video nasty. The house is used as the main location in the film and is used prominently throughout. The people of the city of Portland are thanked gratefully during the end credits for their participation during the films's production.

This location was used in the 1989 movie, The Haunting of Sarah Hardy starring Sela Ward and Morgan Fairchild. This mansion was also used prominently in the 1993 film Body of Evidence starring Madonna and Willem Dafoe. This location was used as the finishing point for the finale of the 13th season of the 6-time Emmy-winning reality game show, The Amazing Race. The mansion was visited during the premiere of the seventeenth season of the Dutch reality show Wie is de Mol? as the site of the season's first test and elimination.

The mansion plays a role in Colin Meloy’s Wildwood Chronicles. In the series, Forest Park is imagined as a magical realm, with Pittock Mansion serving as its seat of government. For the film adaptation of the novel, a miniature set inspired by the mansion was built by Laika.

== See also ==
- Culture of Portland, Oregon
