= Groveland, Illinois =

Groveland
- Village
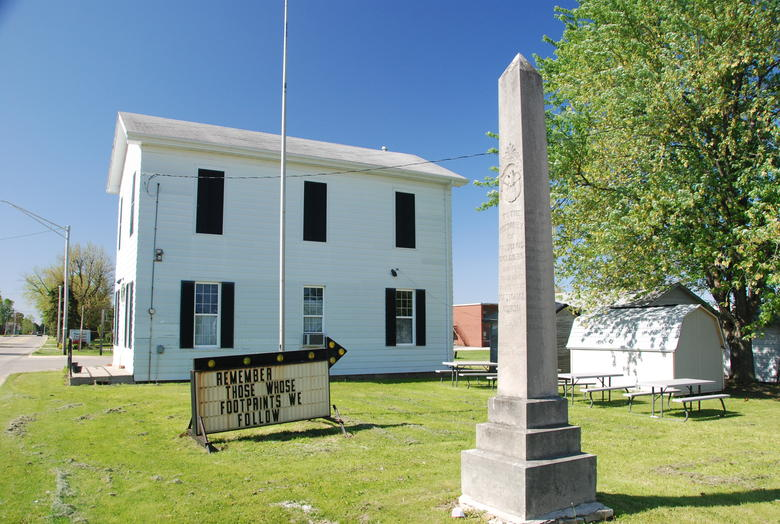
- War memorial in Groveland

- Location of Groveland, Illinois Groveland (Illinois)
- Coordinates: 40°35′28″N 89°31′59″W
- Country: United States
- State: Illinois
- County: Tazewell
- Elevation: 778 ft (237 m)
- Time zone: UTC-6 (CST)
  - Summer (DST): UTC-5 (CDT)
- ZIP code: 61535
- Area code: 309

Groveland is an unincorporated community in Tazewell County, Illinois, United States. It has a small library, a school which is now a church, gas station, war memorial, country store with restaurant and chapel, churches, Pyramid Printing Inc. and a handful of other small businesses. It has approximately 1400 residents and is located near Pekin and Morton. It lies within ten miles of Peoria, near Springfield Road and Edgewater Drive, which is Illinois State Route 98.

== Notable people ==
- Catherine Amanda Coburn (1839–1913), journalist, newspaper editor
- Harlan Tarbell (1890-1960), magician, artist, author
- Abigail Scott Duniway (1834–1915), writer on women's rights; Oregon pioneer.
- Carl Graddy (1965- ), Event DJ, TV/Film Actor
