= Mary Sawtelle =

Mary Priscilla Avery Sawtelle
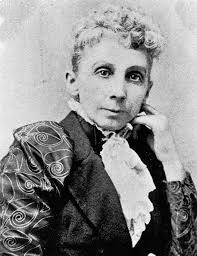
- in about 1891
- Born: April 30, 1835; New York City
- Died: April 22, 1894 (aged 58); New York City
- Education: Willamette Institute
- Occupation: Doctor
- Known for: early doctor and rights champion
- Spouses: Carsena A. Huntley; Cheston Sawtelle
- Children: 6

Mary Priscilla Avery Sawtelle (April 30, 1835 – April 22, 1894) was an American medical doctor who worked primarily in Oregon. She was also a proponent of women's rights and the editor of the Medico-Literary Journal.

== Life ==
Sawtelle was born in New York City in 1835. Her father, Benjamin, was a Methodist minister. After her father died, she moved with her mother and step-father to Marion County in 1848. She married Carsena A. Huntley when she was fourteen so that her new husband could make a land claim in her name of an additional 320 acres of land in Oregon. Permission was conditionally given by her mother, Priscilla, and her new husband, John Stipp, who was a minister. The condition was that Huntley, who was twenty one years older than her, agreed they would not live together until she was seventeen, and that their first child would be when she was twenty-five. However, they were soon living together and Sawtelle had her first child at the age of fifteen. Before she was twenty-five, she had three children and an abusive husband. She successfully filed for divorce, but the judge awarded the custody of their children to Carsena Huntley.

In 1861 she remarried Cheston M. Sawtelle, whom she had met whilst studying at the Willamette Institute. They both started teaching and had three children. In 1869, she was first woman studying medicine at Willamette. Her cause was taken up by women's rights supporters, including newspaper editor Abigail Scott Duniway. With their support, she attended the homeopathic New York Medical College and Hospital for Women, and she graduated in 1872. Meanwhile Duniway was set to appear at Oregon's State House in order to put forward the case for women's suffrage. Duniway was appearing on behalf of the Oregon State Woman Suffrage Association, but no one wanted to keep her company. Other women feared what their husbands' and others might say, so Sawtelle accompanied Duniway.

Sawtelle died in New York City in 1894 after an operation.

== Views on Chinese Americans in Chinatown, San Francisco ==
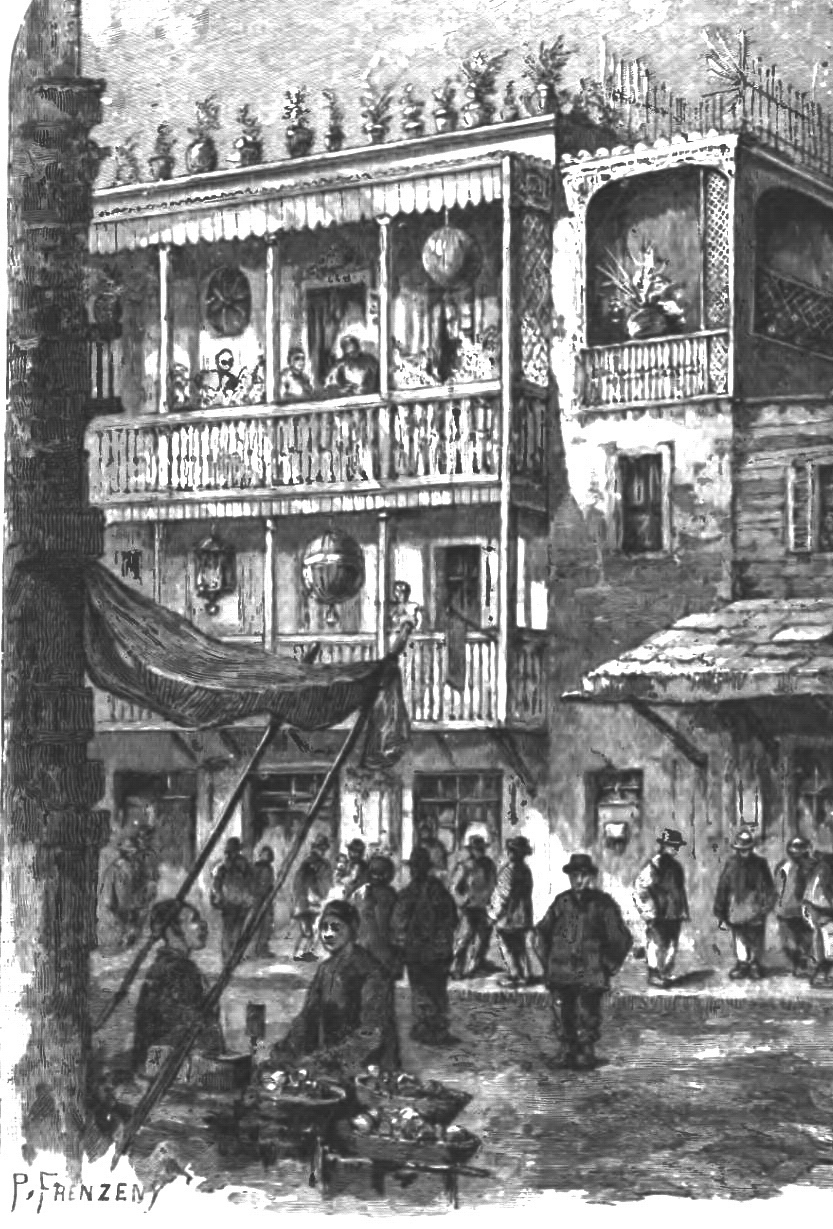
Illustration of Chinatown, San Francisco in 1900

As the editor of the Medico-Literary Journal (a medical advice journal), Sawtelle contributed to late nineteenth century fears of syphilis and participated in the anti-Chinese movement. She argued that immigrants and arriving ships from China brought syphilis into the United States.

“... and every ship from China brings hundreds of these syphilitic and leprous heathens. They sit in the streetcar beside our wives and daughters. They are a stench. Their mean stature, their ugly faces and their imbecile nastiness mirrors to us what syphilis will do for a nation.”

Her racialized discourse on syphilis contributed to the anti-Chinese movement, and she depicted the “deviant” Chinese body as contagious to the nation. She argued that syphilis caused the Chinese's “copper” colored skin and speculated that Chinese immigrants would cause the deterioration of the white American race. Sawtelle, like other public health authorities in California during the 1870s and 1880s, viewed Chinese prostitutes as the originator in the spread of venereal diseases across San Francisco. In her writings for the Medico-Literary Journal, she often dehumanized Chinese women, describing them as filthy carriers of infectious diseases.

Her campaigns against Chinese prostitutes coincided with the social purity movement and the new rise of reformers who addressed social problems by asserting their moral authority as white virtuous women. These middle-class and elite women invoked their virtues, gained from the domestic sphere, to call for social and political change. Sawtelle utilized the Medico-Literary Journal as a medium to provide women with health advice. She used racialized rhetoric in her writings as she urged white women to protect themselves from syphilitic Chinese prostitutes. Instead of critiquing white men for their many sexual partners, Sawtelle denounced Chinese women for ruining American virtues. She viewed Chinese prostitutes as threatening to white Christian marriage and promoted various methods in addressing syphilis in the United States through regulating Chinese prostitutes.

Her rhetoric against syphilis and Chinese women influenced how American physicians and politicians interpreted the disease in the twentieth century. Physicians increasingly saw syphilis as a cause for racial degeneration and a threat to population numbers. Sawtelle’s campaigns against Chinese prostitutes and calls for their regulation also coincided with growing eugenic practices in the United States during the late nineteenth century.
