= Henry Pittock =

American businessman and pioneer

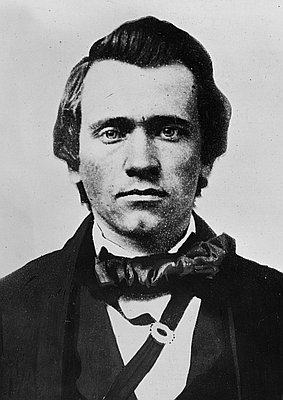
- Pittock c. 1861
- Born: Henry Lewis Pittock; March 1, 1835 (some sources cite 1836); London, England
- Died: January 28, 1919 (aged 82 or 83); Portland, Oregon, U.S.
- Occupations: Publisher; businessperson
- Spouse: Georgiana Martin Burton (m. 1860)
- Children: 9 (6 surviving to adulthood)

Henry Lewis Pittock (March 1, 1835 (some sources cite 1836) – January 28, 1919) was an English-born American pioneer, publisher, newspaper editor, and wood and paper magnate. He was active in Republican politics and Portland, Oregon civic affairs, and was a Freemason and an avid outdoorsman. He is frequently referred to as the founder of The Oregonian, although it was an existing weekly before he reestablished it as the state's preeminent daily newspaper.

Pittock Mansion, a Renaissance revival mansion built by Pittock for himself and his wife, is a museum chronicling his and his family's roles in the development of Portland.

== Biography ==
=== Early life ===
Born in London in 1835 or 1836 (sources vary), the son of Frederick and Susanna (Bonner) Pittock, Henry Lewis Pittock was raised from age four in Pittsburgh, Pennsylvania, United States, where his father had moved the family and established a printing business. The third of eight children, he attended public schools and apprenticed in his father's print shop from the age of twelve. He subsequently attended the Western Pennsylvania University preparatory school in Pittsburgh. He left home at seventeen with his brother, Robert, and inspired by frontier adventure stories, joined two other families to emigrate to the West.

Pittock arrived "barefoot and without a cent" in the Oregon Territory in October 1853 and was rebuffed in his attempts to become a printer for the Oregon Spectator in Oregon City, the first and largest newspaper published in the territory. Declining the only job he had been offered, that of a bartender, he found work as a typesetter for Thomas J. Dryer, founding editor and publisher of the weekly Oregonian in Portland, who provided him room and board as his only remuneration. The accommodations were meager, consisting of a space below the front counter where Pittock could spread some blankets. After six months on that basis, he was granted a salary of $900 a year. Over the next six years, Pittock was receiving a growing partnership interest in the paper in lieu of a salary. Dryer, paying more attention to politics than his business, was frequently unable to pay. Pittock assumed the duties of manager and editor of the newspaper.

== Marriage ==
Pittock married Georgiana Martin Burton, the daughter of a flour mill owner, in 1860. The couple had nine children, six of whom survived to adulthood, and lived in a small house on a block of land now known as the "Pittock Block" that he purchased for $300 in 1856.

=== Mountain climbing ===
An avid outdoorsman and adventurer, Pittock is credited with being the first to ascend the summit of Mount Hood on July 11, 1857, with four friends, although his employer, Dryer, made a disputed prior claim.

=== Publishing ===
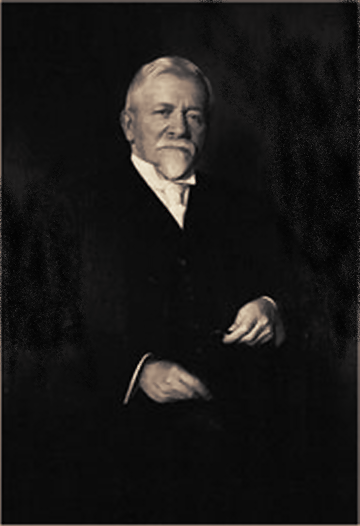
Portrait of Pittock

In 1861, the newly elected President Lincoln rewarded Dryer for his work on the campaign in Oregon with a political appointment in the new administration. Dryer turned over the debt-ridden Oregonian to Pittock as compensation for remaining unpaid salary and agreement to assume the paper's sizable financial obligations. Pittock began daily publication of the Morning Oregonian on February 4, 1861, on a new steam-powered press he had purchased for the expanded enterprise. Competition with the three other daily newspapers in Portland was fierce and at least two of the rivals, the Times and the Advertiser, appeared to have a better chance of success than the Oregonian. Both the telegraph and Pittock's competitiveness would play a part a few years later, when President Lincoln was assassinated, as told in a story related by the son of the Western Union telegraph operator in an oral history recorded by the Federal Writers Project. The telegrapher had been befriended by Pittock, and when news came across the wire of the assassination, the young man concealed it from the other papers until The Oregonian had published the news as a scoop.

Pittock addressed the fiscal problems of the paper by requiring cash payment for subscriptions, and implemented a vigorous collection effort for accounts Dryer had allowed to become delinquent. Ultimately, Pittock not only was able to bring stability to The Oregonian, but dominance in the Portland newspaper market. He was quick to invest heavily in new equipment and production procedures to stay ahead of the competition, sometimes dangerously stretching available capital.

Longtime Oregonian editor Harvey W. Scott claimed Pittock had promised him a half interest in The Oregonian in 1877, only to learn later that it went instead to wealthy U.S. Senator Henry Winslow Corbett for a much needed infusion of cash. Scott would ultimately purchase shares in the paper and had a long intermittent tenure on its staff, leaving for a time to work for the rival Portland Bulletin. Although they were able to maintain a working relationship afterward, it was forever strained by what Scott viewed as a serious betrayal. The bitterness would extend for generations between the two men's heirs, occasionally exhibiting itself in management disputes at the paper.

It was one of several famous Pittock feuds. Another involved onetime Oregonian employee, and later City councilman, Will H. Daly. Long a political nemesis, Daly enraged Pittock by implicating him in a scheme to provide a water service to his palatial home at considerable taxpayer expense. Although the resulting scandal soon died down, Pittock continued relentlessly to discredit Daly, and ultimately succeeded in ending his political career, branding him as a socialist, through publication of documents obtained by burglary.

=== Financial empire ===
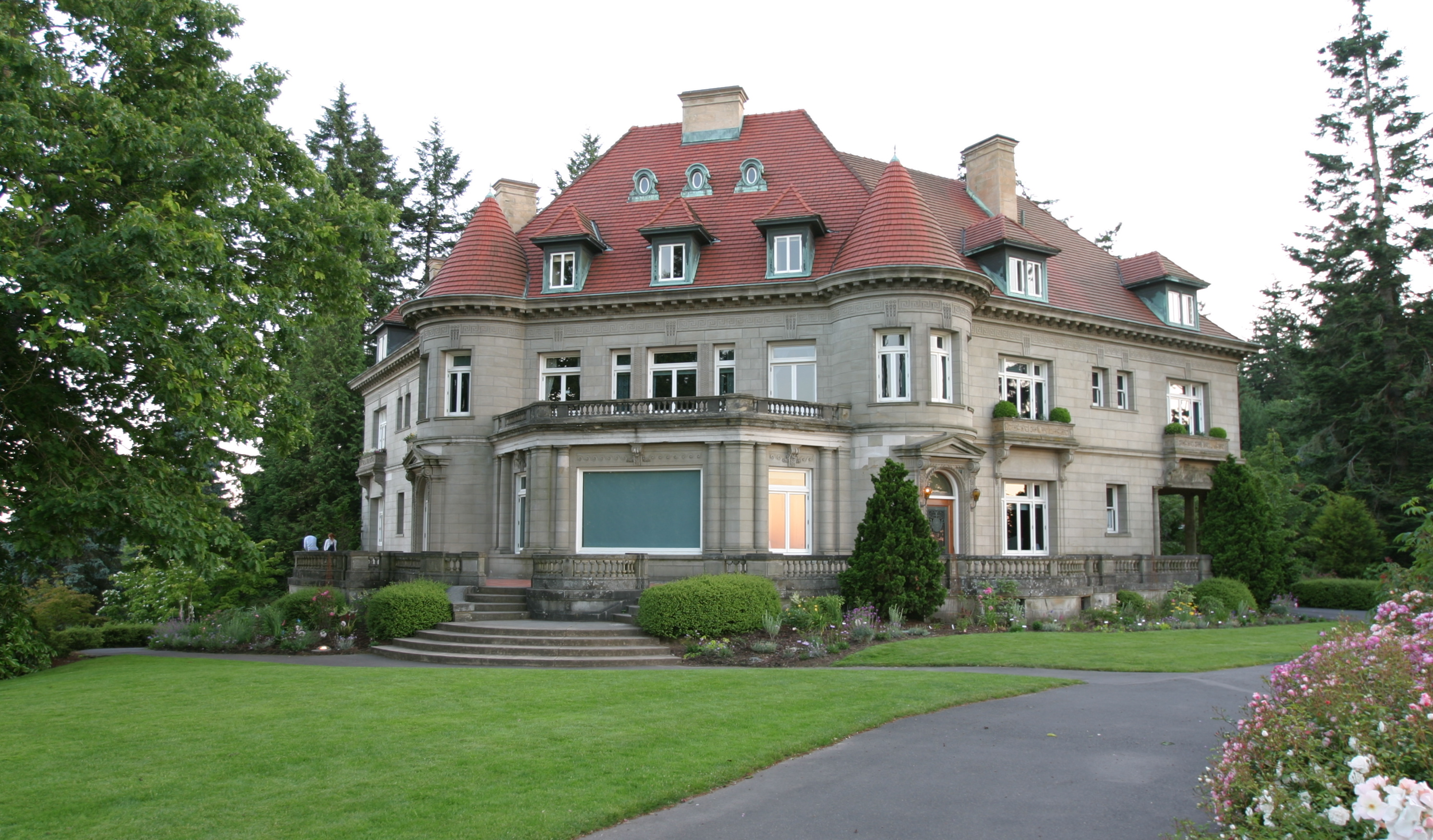
Pittock Mansion

In 1866, Pittock was a partner in the first paper mill in the Northwest, at Oregon City, and later a second mill there and another at Camas, Washington. The Columbia River Paper Co. was formed by Pittock and Joseph K. Gill in 1884 to build the Camas facility. The mills supplied newsprint to The Oregonian and the Portland Evening Telegram which Pittock established in 1877 and the expanded and widely distributed Sunday Oregonian. Beginning in 1884, new presses were bought that raised printing capacity to 12,000 copies an hour and later to 24,000 copies an hour. The paper mills would grow into a thriving company, eventually becoming part of the giant Georgia Pacific company. The Telegram Building in Portland is one of the city's two remaining historic newspaper buildings.

Pittock's business interests would soon grow to include investments in Portland banks, real estate, transportation, and logging and lumbering. In 1909, he began construction of a 22-room Renaissance revival mansion on forty-six acres of woodland, now a public-owned landmark known as the Pittock Mansion. The "Pittock block," still extant in downtown Portland where he and his family had lived since 1856, had become valuable downtown property and he leased it in 1912 for more than $8.3 million. The Northwestern Bank Building, at the corner of 6th and Morrison streets in Portland, was headquarters to the Northwestern National Bank Company, which he founded in 1912 with his son-in-law and paper mill partner, Frederick Leadbetter. The building now houses a Wells Fargo Bank branch and twelve stories of commercial offices. Pittock served as its president until his death and it survived him until it fell to a bank run in 1927.

=== Later life and death ===
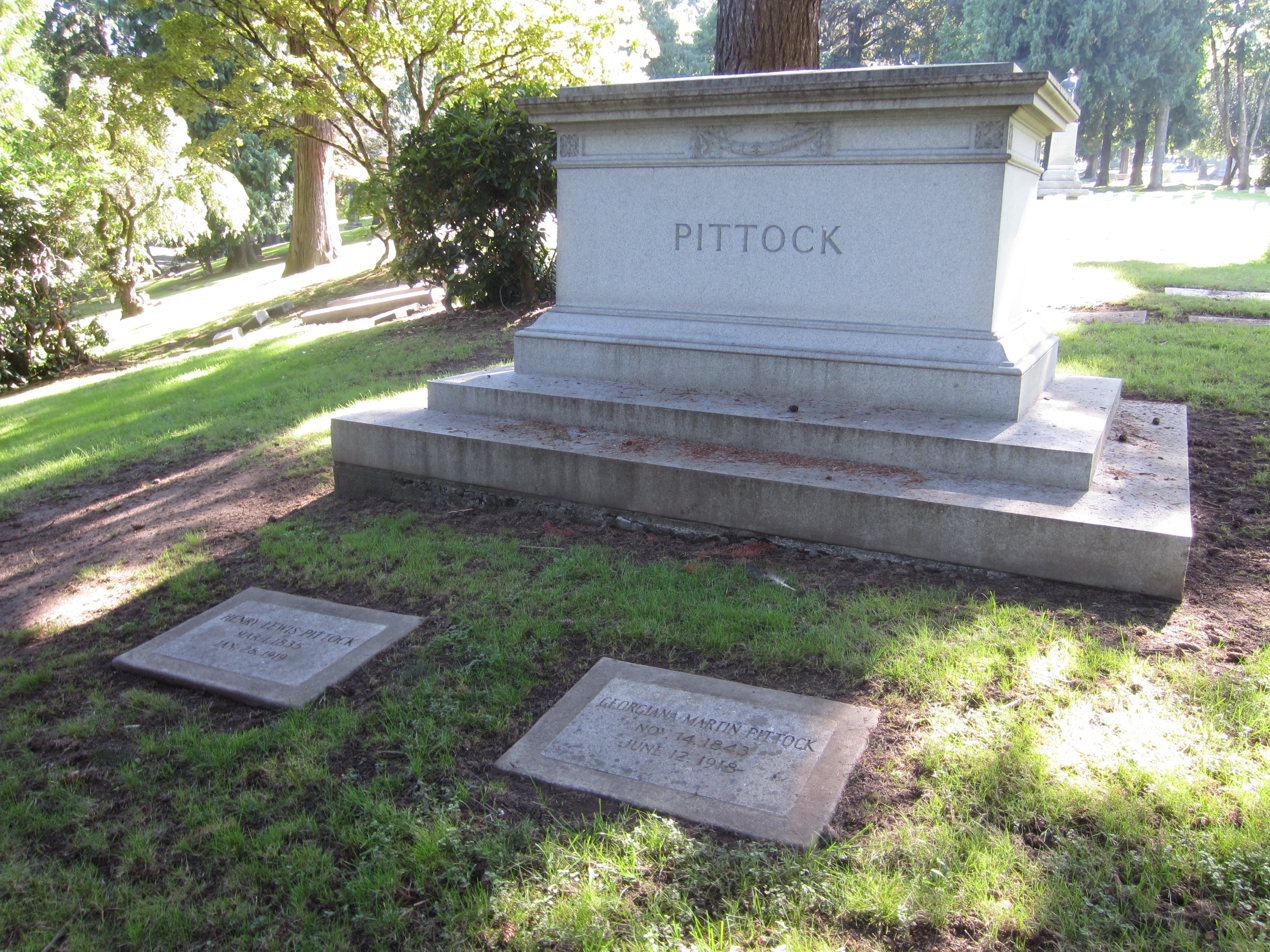
Gravesite of Pittock and his wife, Georgiana Burton Pittock

Having briefly lost control of the paper during the 1870s, and narrowly escaping bankruptcy during the depression of 1877,

Pittock continued to manage his newspaper, maintaining long hours in his office until days before his death in Portland. Stricken with influenza, he was reported to have had himself carried to an east bay window of his mansion, to look once more at the vista across the city where he had made and broken careers, and amassed a fortune. The next night, January 28, 1919, he died leaving the largest estate which had yet been probated in Oregon, valued at $7,894,778.33, equivalent to $147 million today. Pittock was buried at River View Cemetery in Portland.

Unwilling to yield control of his newspaper even in death, he had provided in his will for a majority of the shares of The Oregonian stock to be held by two trustees, with "full and complete authority" to run the paper for 20 years. Upon dissolution of the trust, its shares were divided amongst Pittock's heirs and, for a time, were managed by a board of two representatives of the Pittock family and one representing the Scotts. The arrangement eventually gave way to the Oregonian, "crown jewel" of the Pittock empire, being sold to a succession of national newspaper chains. Pittock was among the first inductees in the Oregon Newspaper Hall of Fame at the same time as his longtime editor, Harvey W. Scott, when it was established in 1979.

== See also ==
- Willamette Industries, Inc. - a forestry company co-founded by Pittock
- Harkins Transportation Company
