= Portland Academy and Female Seminary =

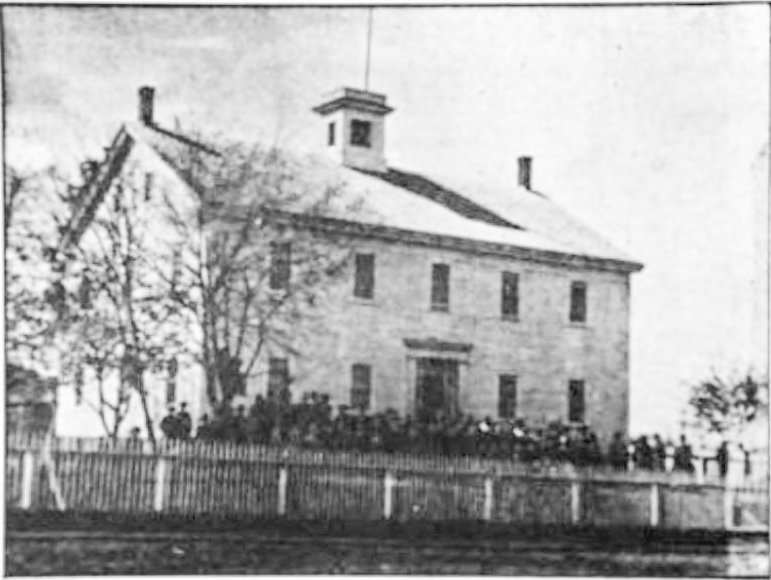
- A view of the Portland Academy in 1865

Location
- Portland, Oregon; United States; 45.515221°N 122.682655°W

Information
- Type: Private, Secondary
- Religious affiliation: Methodist
- Established: November 17, 1851
- Closed: 1876
- Trustees: William S. Ladd, Alexander Abernethy, Gustavus Hines, C.S. Kingsley, William M. King, P.A. Marquam, Clinton Kelley, Harvey K. Hines, P.G. Buchanan, E.C. Baker, J.O. Waterman, Thomas H. Pearne, A.F. Waller, James H. Wilbur, Thomas J. Dryer, Dr. Perry Prettyman

The Portland Academy and Female Seminary was a private school in Portland, Oregon, United States, operated by the Methodist Episcopal Church from 1851 until 1876. Often abbreviated as the Portland Academy, the school was among the few secondary schools in Portland during the years of the Oregon Territory. Later it served briefly as an alternative to Portland High School.

== History ==
The Portland Academy and Female Seminary was founded in 1851 on property donated by some of Portland's early residents. Although the area may not have been fully platted at the time, it corresponded to block 205 along Park Street on the Survey of Portland Map of 1852 and blocks 205 and 224 on East and West Park Avenue on later maps. The school's location was so remote in 1851 that some parents feared their children would get lost on their way to and from school. The property deed given to James H. Wilbur, a leader in the Methodist Episcopal Oregon Mission, specified "a male and female seminary," but for unknown reasons the school was named the Portland Academy and Female Seminary.

C. S. Kingsley, later Superintendent of Portland Public Schools, was the first principal. By 1852, P.G. Buchanan had become principal and Kingsley had returned to his duties for the Willamette District of the Methodist Mission. From the beginning, the school referred to teaching staff by gender specific titles, where men were teachers and women were preceptresses.

In 1854 the Oregon Territorial Legislature provided for funding of public schools, and in 1858 Portland's Central School opened on Sixth Avenue between Morrison and Yamhill Streets. Enrollment at the Portland Academy began to decrease, and when Portland High School was constructed in 1869, the Portland Academy soon became obsolete. It closed in 1876, and the property was deeded to Willamette University.

== Notable alumni ==
- Lucie Fulton Isaacs, author, suffragist

== See also ==
- Education in Portland, Oregon
- History of Portland, Oregon
