= Oregon Pioneer Association =

Fraternal and lineage society of Oregon

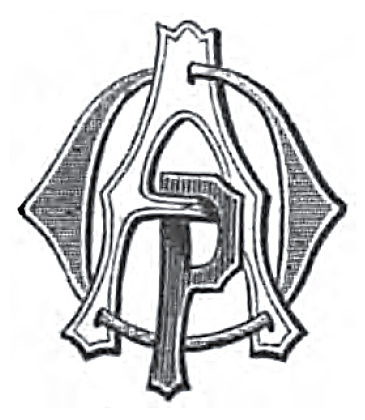
Official logo of the Oregon Pioneer Association, named such from 1873.

The Oregon Pioneer Association (originally known as the Oregon Pioneer Society), first established in October 1867, was a fraternal and lineage society and historical organization for early American settlers of the Oregon Territory.

The Association, a non-governmental organization, had both fraternal and academic aspects. Its members gathered at conventions and published annual addresses dealing with pioneer life. The group thrived throughout the decades of the 1870s and 1880s, eventually giving way due to the attrition of its members to a new organization known as the Sons and Daughters of Oregon Pioneers, established in 1901. The OPA appears to have terminated in approximately 1928.

== History ==
=== Establishment ===
Seal of the OPA, which the group began using during the 1890s.

The Oregon Pioneer Society (OPS) was organized in Salem, Oregon at a meeting held October 8 and 9, 1867, in the Oregon State Capitol building's hall of the house of representatives. The individual given chief credit for organization of the Society was William H. Gray, who was simultaneously involved in the establishment of a historical research organization, the Oregon Pioneer and Historical Society, with an office located in Astoria.

Membership in the Oregon Pioneer Society was open to any individual who came to Oregon during the period that the Oregon Territory was under join occupancy of the United States and Great Britain, or who had been born in or settled in the Oregon Territory prior to January 1, 1854.

The OPS held annual gatherings, typically in approximate conjunction with the June 15 anniversary of the Oregon Treaty of 1846, which formally ended the Oregon boundary dispute between the United States and Great Britain. Annual conventions were held at various locales throughout the state, at which keynote addresses dealing with themes of pioneer history were delivered by leading participants.

The Society maintained an archive including a list of its members, details of their place of birth and move to Oregon.

=== Renaming ===
For more than half a century the Oregon Pioneer Association published pamphlets containing speeches delivered to its annual meetings and other historical materials.

On October 18, 1873, the Oregon Pioneer Society was reorganized as the Oregon Pioneer Association (OPA). The group continued to hold annual meetings each June, usually around the June 15 "Pioneer Day" holiday, with stenographic reports of these meetings published in pamphlet form for the historical record.

In 1874 the Oregon Pioneer Association offered to merge with the Oregon Historical Society, but the offer was declined, apparently due to the latter group's intention to limit itself to historical study rather than fraternal interaction.

The OPA remained financially and socially viable well into the decade of the 1880s. There followed a 15-year decline, as death took its toll and the membership and associated dues revenue which supported the Oregon Pioneer Association plummeted.

The OPA entered into partnership with a new organization, the Native Sons of Oregon in 1899, along with another aging and declining fraternal organization of the pioneer period, the Indian War Veterans of the North Pacific Coast.

=== Termination ===
Due to its declining numbers inevitably resulting from the deaths of eligible members, the Oregon Pioneer Association was largely supplanted in 1901 by the Sons and Daughters of Oregon Pioneers, a new fraternal and historical association with less stringent eligibility requirements for its members. The OPA proper continued in existence, holding annual meetings through 1928.

== Presidents ==
From the time of reorganization in 1873 until 1921, the presidents of the OPA were:

- Francis X. Matthieu, 1873
- John W. Grim, 1874
- John Minto IV, 1875–1876; 1889–1890
- William J. Herren, 1877
- Medorem Crawford, 1878–1881
- James W. Nesmith, 1882–1883
- J. T. Aperson, 1884–1885; 1899
- M. Wilkins, 1886–1887
- Joseph Watt, 1888
- William S. Ladd, 1891–1892
- Henry W. Corbett, 1893–1894
- Henry Failing, 1895
- George H. Williams, 1896–1897
- Benton Killin, 1898
- Lee Laughlin, 1900
- J. H. D. Gray, 1901
- Julius C. Moreland, 1902
- William Galloway, 1903
- W. T. Wright, 1904
- John W. Minto, Jr., 1905
- Melvin C. George, 1906
- Joseph D. Lee, 1907
- J. E. Magers, 1908
- Frederick V. Holman, 1909
- P. H. D'Arcy, 1910
- Robert A. Miller, 1911
- Joseph Buchtel, 1912
- Joseph L. Carter, 1913
- Theodore T. Geer, 1914
- Charles B. Moores, 1915
- Cyrus H. Walker, 1916
- W. H. H. Dufur, 1917
- Ebenezer B. McFarland, 1918 (died)
- Nathan H. Bird, 1918
- A. J. Hunsaker, 1919
- C. H. Caufield, 1920
- Ellen Chamberlain, 1921

== Publications ==
- Constitution of the Oregon Pioneer Association (1874).

=== Transactions ===
1874 | 1875 | 1876 | 1877 | 1878 | 1879 | 1880 | 1881 | 1882 |
