= The New Northwest =

American weekly newspaper (1871–1887)

- Type: Weekly newspaper
- Owner(s): Abigail Scott Duniway, O. P. Mason
- Publisher: Abigail Scott Duniway
- Editor: Abigail Scott Duniway
- Founded: 1871
- Ceased publication: 1889
- Political alignment: A journal devoted to "free speech, free press, free people" along with a focus on women's rights
- Headquarters: Portland, Oregon

Cover of the first issue of The New Northwest, dated May 5, 1871

The New Northwest was an American weekly newspaper published in Portland, Oregon, from 1871 to 1887 by Abigail Scott Duniway, and for another two years by O. P. Mason. One of the first newspapers in the Western United States to champion the cause of women's rights, during its 16-year run, The New Northwest emerged as a vigorous voice for women's suffrage and for liberalization of marriage law and property rights for women. The newspaper's motto was Free Speech, Free Press, Free People.

In addition to news reports, The New Northwest included topical essays, travel correspondence, and serialized fiction, much of which was written by the prolific Duniway herself.

== History ==
=== Establishment ===
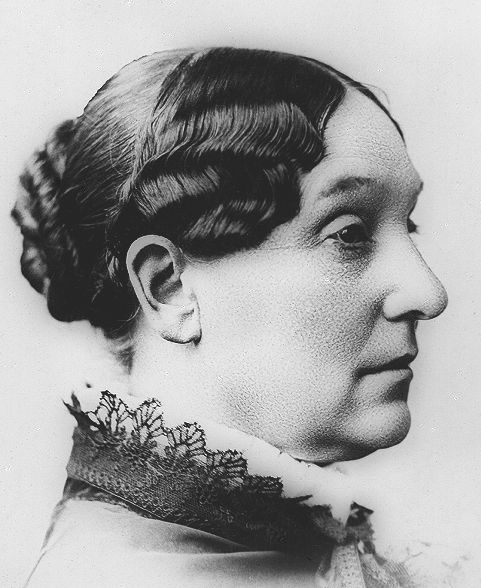
Abigail Scott Duniway (1834–1915), feminist activist and publisher and editor of The New Northwest

The New Northwest was launched on May 5, 1871, by Abigail Scott Duniway (1834–1915). Together with her younger brother, the future chief editorialist of the Portland Oregonian Harvey W. Scott (1838–1910), Abigail Scott had become a pioneer to the Oregon Territory in 1852, losing her mother to cholera en route on the Oregon Trail. The future editor had married and begun a family of six children shortly after arriving in the state, moving to Portland early in 1871, just in time to launch her weekly newspaper.

Duniway was moved to a life of political activism and publishing by a deep sense of moral outrage over the control of women's lives by the laws and traditional practices of men. She sought to open debate about a wide array of issues important to women through her weekly broadsheet, including not just news of the day but discussions of women's suffrage, divorce law, and the economic conditions facing women in frontier-era Oregon. By 1883, the paper had been widely circulated beyond Oregon and Washington, including parts of Idaho and Montana. The launch of Duniway's newspaper is regarded by contemporary historians as the first significant event launching the women's movement in the Pacific Northwest.

=== Political campaigns ===
Duniway was instrumental in bringing Susan B. Anthony to Oregon late in the summer of 1871, having the previous year written a letter to invite either her or Elizabeth Cady Stanton to tour the state speaking on behalf of the right to vote for women. Duniway managed a statewide tour for Anthony in succeeding weeks before sending her back to California and overland return to the East. The pair were at the time optimistic about early victories for the suffrage movement in the states of the Pacific Coast, California and Oregon, as well as the Washington Territory, which was finally incorporated into the United States in 1889.

The hopes of Duniway and Anthony were not to be rapidly rewarded in Oregon, however, as male voters five times rejected proposals to expand voting rights to women, voting down initiatives in 1884, 1900, 1906, 1908 and 1910.

Greater success was realized in the field of property rights for women, however, with Duniway and The New Northwest's efforts credited for helping to pass the Married Women's Property Act of 1878 in Oregon, allowing women the right to their wages and to property under state law for the first time.

Only in 1912, long after the 1887 demise of The New Northwest, did Oregon pass its women's suffrage initiative—an event which Governor Oswald West marked by seeking out the ailing Abigail Scott Duniway and asking her to author and sign the state's official proclamation of suffrage.

=== Business operation ===
The New Northwest was a family business for the Duniway family, with Abigail's husband Benjamin C. Duniway—permanently disabled since an accident involving a runaway horse team in 1862—acting as business manager and several of the couple's five sons assisting with the printing of the paper. Duniway's sister, Catherine Coburn, served for a time as editor. The paper prominently bore an assertive motto, "Free Speech, Free Press, Free People," which Duniway attempted to make a hallmark of the paper. Brother Harvey W. Scott contributed occasionally to the publication following his departure from the Oregonian.

=== Termination ===
Duniway sold the New Northwest to O. P. Mason in 1887. Mason dropped the paper's political content, and refashioned it as a purely literary publication for two more years.
