= Abigail Scott Duniway =

American suffragist, writer, journalist, pioneer (1834–1915)

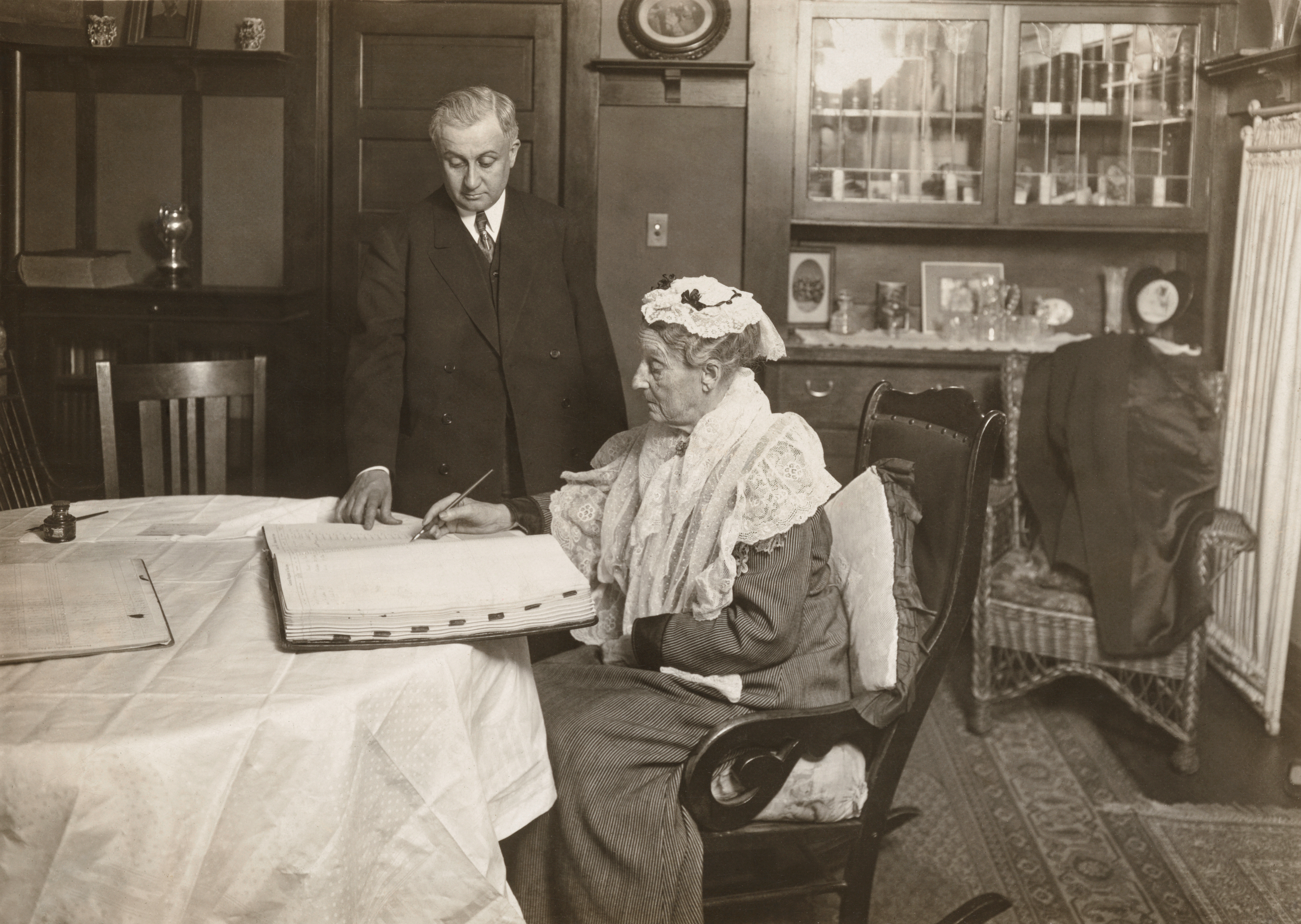
- Duniway registering to vote, February 14, 1913, with Multnomah County Clerk John B. Coffey
- Born: Abigail Jane Scott; October 22, 1834 farm near Groveland, Illinois, U.S.
- Died: October 11, 1915 (aged 80); Portland, Oregon, U.S.
- Resting place: River View Cemetery in Portland; 45°27′29″N 122°40′01″W
- Known for: Women's suffrage leadership, writing, journalism, pioneer farming
- Spouse: Benjamin Charles Duniway
- Children: 6
- Parent(s): John Tucker Scott and Ann (Roelofson) Scott
- Relatives: Harvey W. Scott, brother; Catherine Amanda Coburn, sister

Abigail Jane Scott Duniway (October 22, 1834 – October 11, 1915) was an American women's rights advocate, newspaper editor and writer, whose efforts were instrumental in gaining voting rights for women in the United States.

== Personal life ==
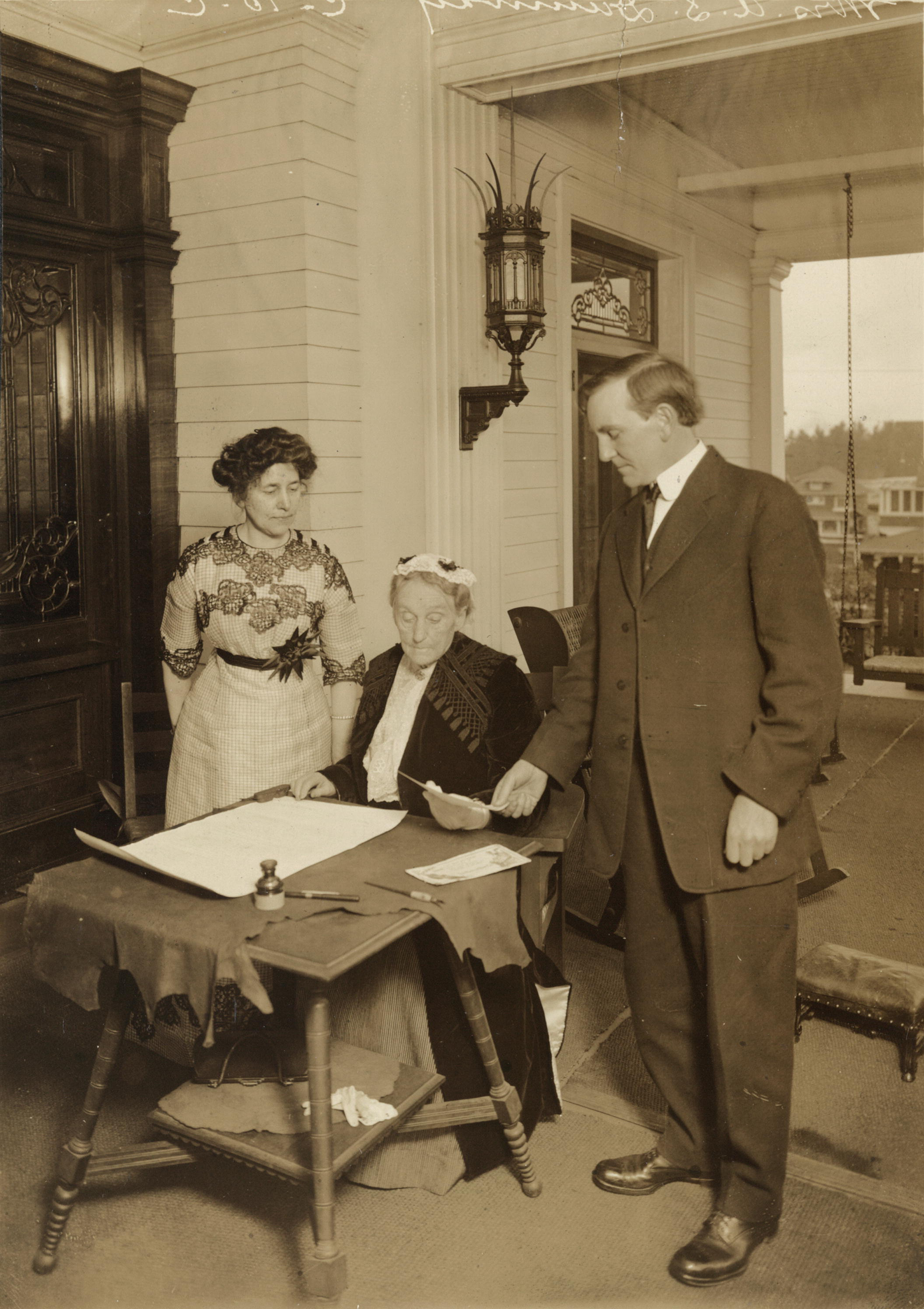
Duniway (seated) with Governor Oswald West, signing the women's suffrage amendment

Duniway was born near Groveland, Illinois, to John Tucker Scott and Anne Roelofson Scott. Of the nine children in her family who survived infancy, she was the second. She grew up on the family farm and attended a local school intermittently. In March 1852, against the wishes of Anne Scott, who had concerns about her health, John organized a party of 30 people and 5 ox-drawn wagons to emigrate to Oregon, 2,400 miles (3,900 km) away by trail. Anne died of cholera near Fort Laramie, on the Oregon Trail, in June, and Willie, age 3, the youngest child in the family, died in August along the Burnt River in Oregon. In October, the emigrants reached their destination, Lafayette, in the Willamette Valley. After teaching school in Eola in early 1853, Abigail Scott Duniway married Benjamin Charles Duniway, a farmer from Illinois, on August 1. They had six children: Clara Belle (b. 1854), Willis Scott (1856), Hubert (1859), Wilkie Collins (1861), Clyde Augustus (1866), and Ralph Roelofson (1869).

The Duniways farmed in Clackamas County until 1857, when they moved to a farm near Lafayette. They lost this second farm after a friend defaulted on a note Benjamin had endorsed. Soon afterward, Benjamin was permanently disabled in an accident involving a runaway team, and Abigail had to support the family. At first, she opened and ran a small boarding school in Lafayette. In 1866, she moved to Albany where she taught in a private school for a year, then opened a millinery and notions shop, which she ran for five years.

== Activism ==
Angered by stories of injustice and mistreatment relayed to her by married patrons of her shop, and encouraged by Benjamin, she moved to Portland in 1871 to found The New Northwest, a weekly newspaper devoted to women's rights, including suffrage. She published the first issue on May 5, 1871, and continued The New Northwest for 16 years.

Duniway toured the Pacific Northwest in the company of Susan B. Anthony, one of the leading voices in the women's suffrage movement. In 1872 she was invited to address Oregon's legislature to put forward the case for women's suffrage. She was appearing on behalf of the Oregon State Woman Suffrage Association, but no one wanted to keep her company. Other women feared what their husbands and others might say. Finally she found Mary Sawtelle who agreed to also venture into this male-only preserve.

Duniway encountered personal setbacks such as poor health and money problems. Her brother Harvey W. Scott, who also edited The Oregonian and later contributed to The New Northwest, opposed woman suffrage in many editorials on the subject. She persisted despite political opposition in the form of local resistance, the consistent failure of women's suffrage referendums on state ballots, and divisions with Eastern suffrage organizations. She and her newspaper actively supported the Sole Trader Bill and the Married Women's Property Act which, when passed, gave Oregon women the right to own and control property.

Her persistence paid off in 1912 when Oregon became the seventh state in the U.S. to pass a women's suffrage amendment. Governor Oswald West asked her to write and sign the equal suffrage proclamation. She was the first woman to register to vote in Multnomah County.

Duniway is buried at River View Cemetery in Portland.

== Publications ==
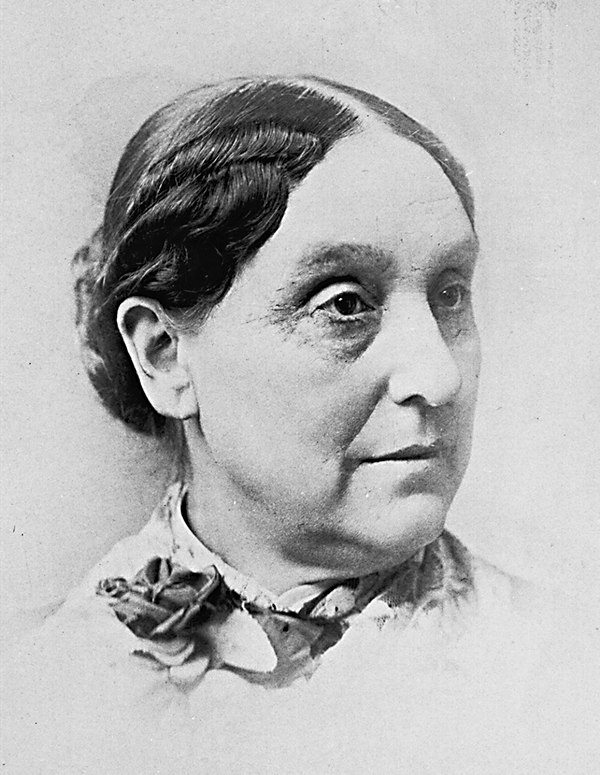
Duniway between 1870 and 1900

Duniway's Captain Gray's Company; or, Crossing the Plains and Living in Oregon (1859), was the first novel to be commercially published in Oregon. This and others that she wrote drew repeatedly on her experiences as a young woman on the Oregon Trail. Her last novel to tell the story was From the West to the West: Across the Plains to Oregon (1905). She wrote a booklet called My Musings after attending a convention of the National Woman Suffrage Association in 1872. Her last publication was Path Breaking: An Autobiographical History of the Equal Suffrage Movement in Pacific Coast States, in 1914.

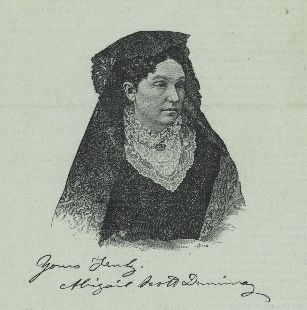
An engraving of Duniway in the middle of her career. Her signature appears below the engraving.

Works written by Duniway and published by others:

- Captain Gray's Company, or Crossing the Plains and Living in Oregon. Portland, Oregon: S. J. McCormick, 1859.
- David and Anna Matson. New York: S.R. Wells & Co., 1876. OCLC 4826144
- From the West to the West: Across the Plains to Oregon. Chicago: A.C. McClurg, 1905.
- My Musings. Portland, Oregon: Duniway Publishing Co., 1875.
- Path Breaking: An Autobiographical History of the Equal Suffrage Movement in Pacific Coast States, 2nd ed. Portland, Oregon: James, Kerns & Abbott, 1914. Reprint New York: Schocken Books, 1971.
- "The Stage Driver's Story." Phrenological Journal. August 1879, pp. 85–90.

Serialized novels written by Duniway and published in the New Northwest:

- Judith Reid: A Plain Story of a Plain Woman. May 12 – December 22, 1871.
- Ellen Dowd: The Farmer's Wife (in two parts). January 5, 1872 – September 26, 1873.
- Amie and Henry Lee: or, The Spheres of the Sexes. May 29 – November 13, 1874.
- The Happy Home: or, The Husband's Triumph. November 20, 1874 – May 14, 1875.
- One Woman's Sphere, or The Mystery of Eagle Cove. June 4 – December 3, 1875.
- Madge Morrison, The Molalla Maid and Matron. December 10, 1875 – July 28, 1876.
- Edna and John: A Romance of Idaho Flat. September 29, 1876 – June 15, 1877.
- Martha Marblehead: The Maid and Matron of Chehalem. June 29, 1877 – February 8, 1878.
- Her Lot, or How She Was Protected (later revised in manuscript form as Ethel Graeme's Destiny: A Story of Real Life). February 1 – September 19, 1878.
- Fact, Fate and Fancy: or, More Ways of Living Than One. September 26, 1878 – May 15, 1879.
- Mrs. Hardine's Will. November 20, 1879 – August 26, 1880.
- The Mystery of Castle Rock, A Story of the Pacific Northwest. March 2 – September 7, 1882.
- Judge Dunson's Secret, An Oregon Story. March 15 – September 6, 1883.
- Laban McShane, A Frontier Story. January 3 – March 6, 1884.
- Dux: A Maiden Who Dared. September 11, 1884 – March 5, 1885
- The De Launcey Curse: or, The Law of Heredity—A Tale of Three Generations. September 10, 1885 – March 4, 1886.
- Blanche Le Clerq: A Tale of the Mountain Mines. September 2, 1886 – February 24, 1887.

Serialized novels written by Duniway and published in The Pacific Empire:

- Shack-Locks: A Story of the Times. October 3, 1895 – March 26, 1896.
- Bijah's Surprises (later revised in manuscript form as Margaret Rudson, A Pioneer Story. Book one, April 2 – September 26, 1896; Book two, October 1 – December 31, 1896.
- The Old and the New. January 7 – December 30, 1897.
