= List of the oldest buildings in Oregon =

This article lists the oldest extant buildings in Oregon, including extant buildings and structures constructed prior to and during the United States rule over Oregon. Only buildings built prior to 1860 are suitable for inclusion on this list, or the building must be the oldest of its type.

In order to qualify for the list, a structure must:

- be a recognizable building (defined as any human-made structure used or intended for supporting or sheltering any use or continuous occupancy);
- incorporate features of building work from the claimed date to at least 1.5 metres (4.9 ft) in height and/or be a listed building.

This consciously excludes ruins of limited height, roads and statues. Bridges may be included if they otherwise fulfill the above criteria. Dates for many of the oldest structures have been arrived at by radiocarbon dating or dendrochronology and should be considered approximate. If the exact year of initial construction is estimated, it will be shown as a range of dates.

== List of oldest buildings ==
Building	Image	Location	First built	Use	Notes
Molalla Log House		near Canby, Oregon	1790s	Residence	Unknown who constructed the structure (possibly trappers, Native American or Russians). Building was moved to a new site in 2021 in the Hopkins Demonstration Forest.
Jason Lee House		Salem, Oregon	1841	Residence	One of the oldest frame building remaining in the state
Methodist Mission Parsonage		Salem, Oregon	1841	Residence	One of the oldest frame building remaining in the state
Francis Ermatinger House		Oregon City, Oregon	1843	Residence	Long thought to be the oldest house in Clackamas County
Delaney–Edwards House		Salem, Oregon	1845	Residence	Currently a Bed & Breakfast
St. Paul Roman Catholic Church (St. Paul, Oregon)		St. Paul, Oregon	1846	Church	Oldest church in Oregon and oldest brick building in Pacific Northwest
McLoughlin House National Historic Site		Oregon City, Oregon	1846	Residence	Home of John McLoughlin a leader of the Hudson's Bay Company and the "father of Oregon"
John D. Boon House		Salem, Oregon	1847	Residence	
Butteville Jail		Champoeg, Oregon	1848	Jail	
Silas Jacob N. Beeks House		Forest Grove, Oregon	1848	Residence	
Watson–Price Farmstead Barn		Benton County, Oregon	1848	Barn	
William L. Holmes House		Oregon City, Oregon	1848	Residence	
Dr. Forbes Barclay House		Oregon City, Oregon	1849	Residence	
Thomas and Walter Monteith House		Albany, Oregon	1849	Residence	
Dayton Common School		Dayton, Oregon	1850	School	
Granville H. Baber House		Linn County, Oregon	1850	Residence	
Malcolm A. Moody House		The Dalles, Oregon	1850	Residence	Oldest house in The Dalles
Morton Matthew McCarver House		Oregon City, Oregon	1850	Residence	
Tualatin Academy		Forest Grove, Oregon	1850	University Building	Oldest university building in the state
White–Kellogg House		Oregon City, Oregon	1850	Residence	
Capt. John C. Ainsworth House		Oregon City, Oregon	1851	Residence	
Hamilton Campbell House		Marion County, Oregon	1851	Residence	
Knighton House		St. Helens, Oregon	1851	Residence	Oldest house in Columbia County
Levi Hagey House		Dundee, Oregon	1851	Residence	
Matthew Murphy House		St. Paul, Oregon	1851	Residence	
Hiram Brown House		Astoria, Oregon	1852	Residence	A part of the Shively–McClure Historic District
Mountain House		Ashland, Oregon	1852	Residence	
Robert Newell House		Champoeg, Oregon	1852	Residence	
Watson–Price Farmstead		Benton County, Oregon	1852	Residence	
Amos Cook House		Dayton, Oregon	1853	Residence	
John Phillips House		Polk County, Oregon	1853	Residence	
Lane County Clerk's Building		Eugene, Oregon	1853	Residence	
Washington County Jail		Washington County, Oregon	1853	Jail	
West Union Baptist Church		Hillsboro, Oregon	1853	Church	
Andrew Jackson and Sarah Jane Masters House		Aloha, Oregon	1854	Residence	
Creed Floed House		Roseburg, Oregon	1854	Residence	
Jacob Conser House		Jefferson, Oregon	1854	Residence	
Mt. Pleasant Presbyterian (Community) Church		Linn County, Oregon	1854	Church	
Daniel and Catherine Christian House		Eugene, Oregon	1855	Residence	Oldest house in Eugene
James Mechlin Anderson House		Marion County, Oregon	1855	Residence	
John Fiechter House		Corvallis, Oregon	1855	Residence	
Patrick F. McManus House		Phoenix, Oregon	1855	Residence	
Tigard-Rogers House		Portland, Oregon	1855	Residence	Oldest house in Portland
Alvin T. Smith House		Forest Grove, Oregon	1854-1856	Residence	
Bybee–Howell House		Sauvie Island, Oregon	1856	Residence	
Charles Applegate House		Yoncalla, Oregon	1856	Residence	
Fort Yamhill Blockhouse		Dayton, Oregon	1856	Blockhouse	
Hiram A. Straight House		Oregon City, Oregon	1856	Residence	
Horace Baker Log Cabin		Carver, Oregon	1856	Residence	
Burford-Stanley House		Monmouth, Oregon	1857	Residence	
Charles Gaylord House		Corvallis, Oregon	1857	Residence	
Fort Dalles Surgeon's Quarters		The Dalles, Oregon	1857	Residence	
Fort Hoskins Commander's House		Benton County, Oregon	1857	Residence	Moved back to the fort from Pedee Creek Road; only surviving structure of the fort
Hallock–McMillan Building		Portland, Oregon	1857	Commercial	Oldest surviving commercial building and oldest brick building in Portland
Hannah and Eliza Gorman House		Corvallis, Oregon	1857	Residence	
Jesse H. Caton House		Corvallis, Oregon	1857	Residence	
Palmer House		Dayton, Oregon	1857	Residence	
Sam Brown House		Gervais, Oregon	1857	Residence	
Fulton–Taylor House		The Dalles, Oregon	1858	Residence	
Jesse and Julia Harritt House		Salem, Oregon	1858	Residence	
John P. Walker House		Ashland, Oregon	1858	Residence	
John Sweek House		Tualatin, Oregon	1858	Residence	
Pleasant Grove Presbyterian Church		Salem, Oregon	1858	Church	
Rock Creek Methodist Church		Clackamas County, Oregon	1858	Church	
Stephen and Parthena M. Blank House		Forest Grove, Oregon	1858	Residence	
Andrew Smith House		Dayton, Oregon	1859	Residence	
Augustus Fanno Farmhouse		Beaverton, Oregon	1859	Residence	
Butteville Academy		Champoeg, Oregon	1859	School	
First Wasco County Courthouse		The Dalles, Oregon	1859	Courthouse	
Horace L. Dibble House		Molalla, Oregon	1859	Residence	
Hugh Fields House		Linn County, Oregon	1859	Residence	
John B. White House		Jackson County, Oregon	1859	Residence	
Spring Valley Presbyterian Church		Zena, Oregon	1859	Church	
333 NE First Street		Oakland, Oregon	1859	Residence	Moved from Old Town Oakland in the 1870s to its current location; part of the Oakland Historic District
Waller Hall		Salem, Oregon	1867	University building	Oldest university building in use on West Coast
Cape Blanco Lighthouse		Curry County, Oregon	1870	Lighthouse	Oldest remaining lighthouse in the state

== See also ==
- National Register of Historic Places listings in Oregon
- History of Oregon
- Oldest buildings in the United States
