= Christian–Patterson Rental Property =

Historic house in Oregon, United States

- Christian-Patterson Rental Property
- U.S. National Register of Historic Places
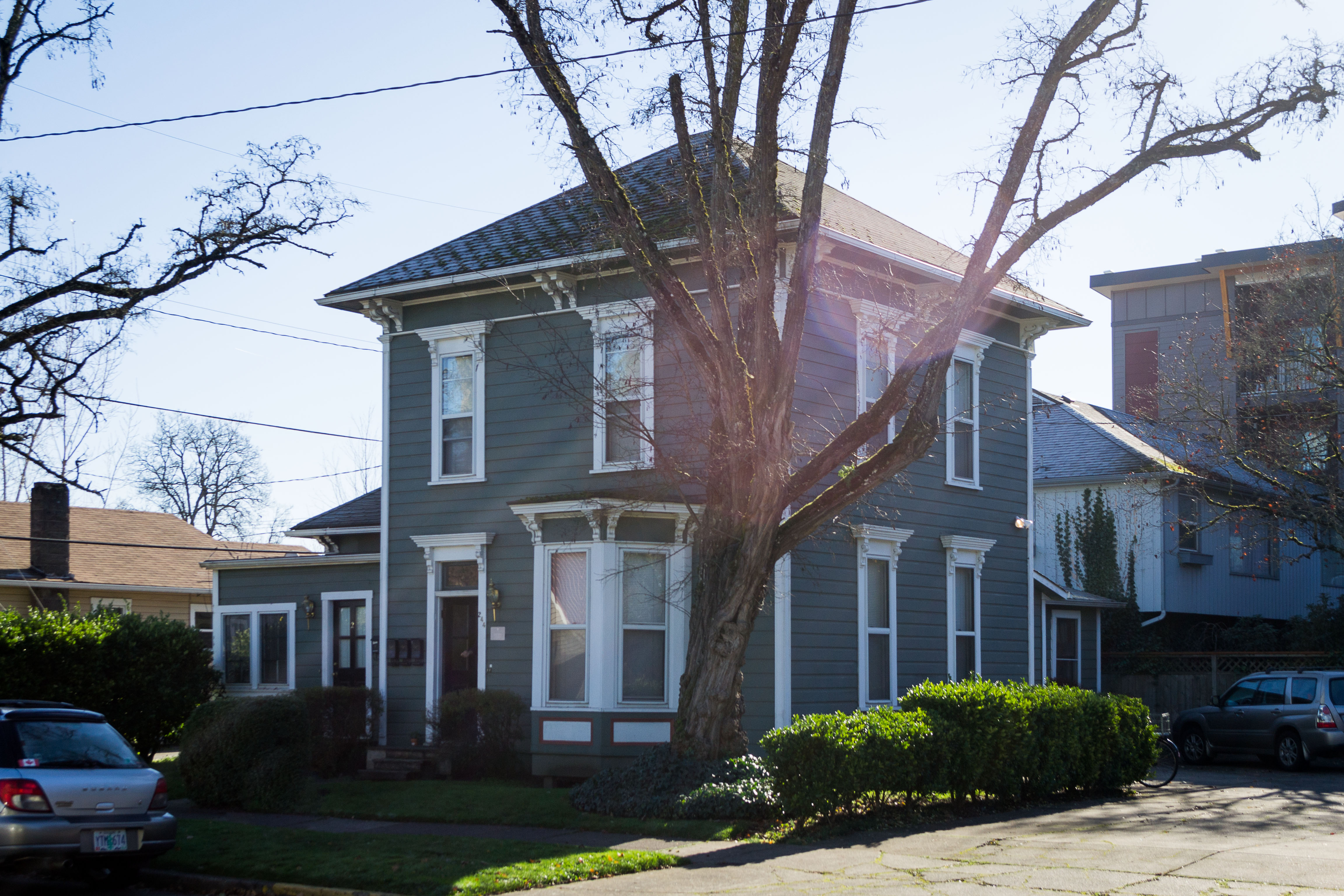
- The house in 2013
- Location: 244 East 16th Avenue; Eugene, Oregon
- Coordinates: 44°02′32″N 123°05′21″W
- Built: c. 1890
- Built by: Daniel Christian
- Architectural style: Italianate
- NRHP reference No.: 91001567
- Added to NRHP: October 24, 1991

The Christian–Patterson Rental Property is a two-story, Italianate house built about 1890 in Eugene, Oregon. The house was constructed by Daniel Christian as a rental property for his daughter, Ethenda. Sarah Patterson, another of Christian's daughters, purchased the property in 1903. Patterson had married Abram S. Patterson, an early Eugene mayor, merchant, and postmaster.

A survey of historic resources in the West University Neighborhood found 339 residential structures, but only five of them were historic and in the Italianate style.

== See also ==
- National Register of Historic Places listings in Lane County, Oregon
