= Souper Bowl of Caring =

American charity

- Founded: 1990 in Columbia, South Carolina
- Founder: Rev. Dr. Brad Smith
- Purpose: Hunger, Poverty, Youth Service
- Headquarters: Bee Cave, TX
- Location(s): United States and some other countries
- Region served: North America (Some participants worldwide)
- Key people: Alison Reese (Executive Director)
- Website: https://www.tacklehunger.org

The Souper Bowl of Caring refers to an organization whereby people collect monetary and food donations traditionally during the weeks leading up to and after Super Bowl Sunday. All of the money and food is then given directly to local charities of the group's choice.

Started in 1990 at Spring Valley Presbyterian Church in Columbia, South Carolina, the Souper Bowl of Caring has branched out to include schools, businesses and congregations of all faiths. Together, they have raised more than $163 million in monetary and food donations. In 2020, thousands of groups collected over $10.6 million of food and contributions.

The Souper Bowl of Caring has gained national attention, securing partnerships with NFL Teams, in addition to finding National Advocates in former President and Mrs. George H. W. Bush and former President and Mrs. Jimmy Carter.

== History ==
The Souper Bowl of Caring began in 1990 with a simple prayer said by Reverend Brad Smith at Spring Valley Presbyterian Church in Columbia, South Carolina:

Lord, even as we enjoy the Super Bowl football game, help us be mindful of those who are without a bowl of soup to eat.

22 churches raised $5,700 in the first year. The number of groups involved has steadily grown each year, and so has the amount raised and put back into the communities.

== Service Blitz ==
During the time before and after the Super Bowl, events known as "Service Blitzes" are held in many communities nationwide. Young people come together to volunteer with and donate to local charities. The goal is to give the youth who volunteer a view of the poverty of their local area. Service Blitzes can vary from awareness events to working at a soup kitchen or homeless shelter.

== Youth Advisory Board ==
While Souper Bowl of Caring is led by adults and youth on the Board of Directors, the basis of the organization is its connection with young people serving their communities. Therefore, in 2007, a Youth Advisory Board (YAB) was created to bring youth ambassadors of the Souper Bowl to local communities around America. The YAB is composed of high school students from around the country who serve as youth spokespersons to the media, lead and advise their respective communities, assist the Souper Bowl of Caring by providing ideas and suggestions and represent the Souper Bowl in a positive manner. Additionally, they attend meetings to prepare for the upcoming service events.

== See also ==
- Souper Bowl of Caring Official Website
- https://www.dailytrib.com/2020/01/22/everyone-wins-by-participating-in-souper-bowl-of-caring/
- ELCA World Hunger's Souper Bowl of Caring page, archived from the original on 2008-11-22
- Mrs. Bush's Remarks at Capital Area Food Bank's Souper Bowl of Caring, January 22, 2004
- The Congressional Record - SC. Representative Addison Wilson recognizes Souper Bowl of Caring in front of the House of Representatives, February 5, 2007
- 'Souper Bowl of Caring' founder encourages Lutherans to raise $1 million, January 18, 2007, archived from the original on April 2, 2007
- UM Youth Workers - Souper Bowl of Caring...get involved!, October 3, 2006
