= Redon (disambiguation) =

Redon, Ille-et-Vilaine is a town in Brittany, France

Redon or Rédon may also refer to:

== People ==
- Gaston Redon (1853-1921), a French architect and teacher
- Jean-Claude Redon de Beaupréau (1738-1815), a French politician
- Joel Redon (1961-1995), an American novelist
- Laurent Rédon (b 1973), a French motor racing driver
- Maxime de Redon des Chapelles (fl 1805-1838), a French writer for the stage
- Odilon Redon (1840-1916), a French Symbolist painter
- Philippe Redon (b 1950), a French footballer and manager
- Redon, a legendary king of the Britons

== Places ==
- Redon Abbey, a former abbey located in Redon, Ille-et-Vilaine
- Saint-Martin-le-Redon, a commune in Lot, France
- Saint-Nicolas-de-Redon, a commune in Loire-Atlantique, France

== Other uses ==
- Treaty of Redon, a 1489 treaty between England and Brittany
