= Spring Valley (Oregon) =

Valley in Polk County, Oregon, United States

Coordinates: 44.996785°N 123.119821°W

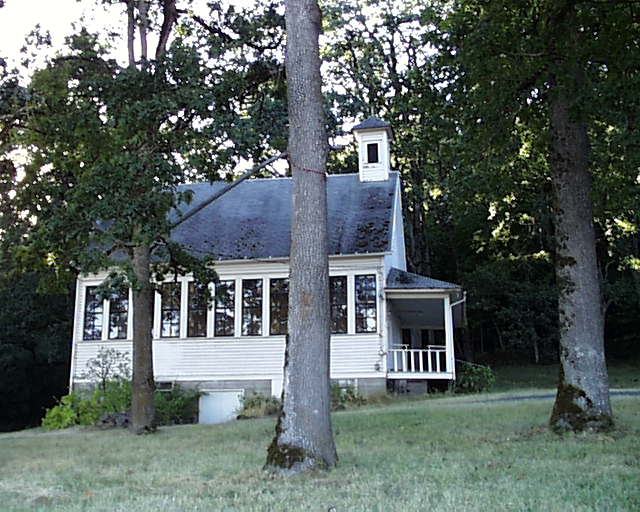
Spring Valley Community Center, formerly the Spring Valley School

Spring Valley is a valley in Polk County, Oregon, United States, situated north and east of the Eola Hills and west of the Willamette River. It corresponds roughly to the drainage of Spring Valley Creek. Populated places in Spring Valley include Zena and Lincoln. Oregon Route 221 passes along the east side of the valley, next to the Willamette River.

The area is in the Eola-Amity Hills AVA wine region and is home to several notable vineyards, including Cristom.

== See also ==
- John Phillips House
- Spring Valley Presbyterian Church
