= Pioneer Mothers Memorial Cabin Museum =

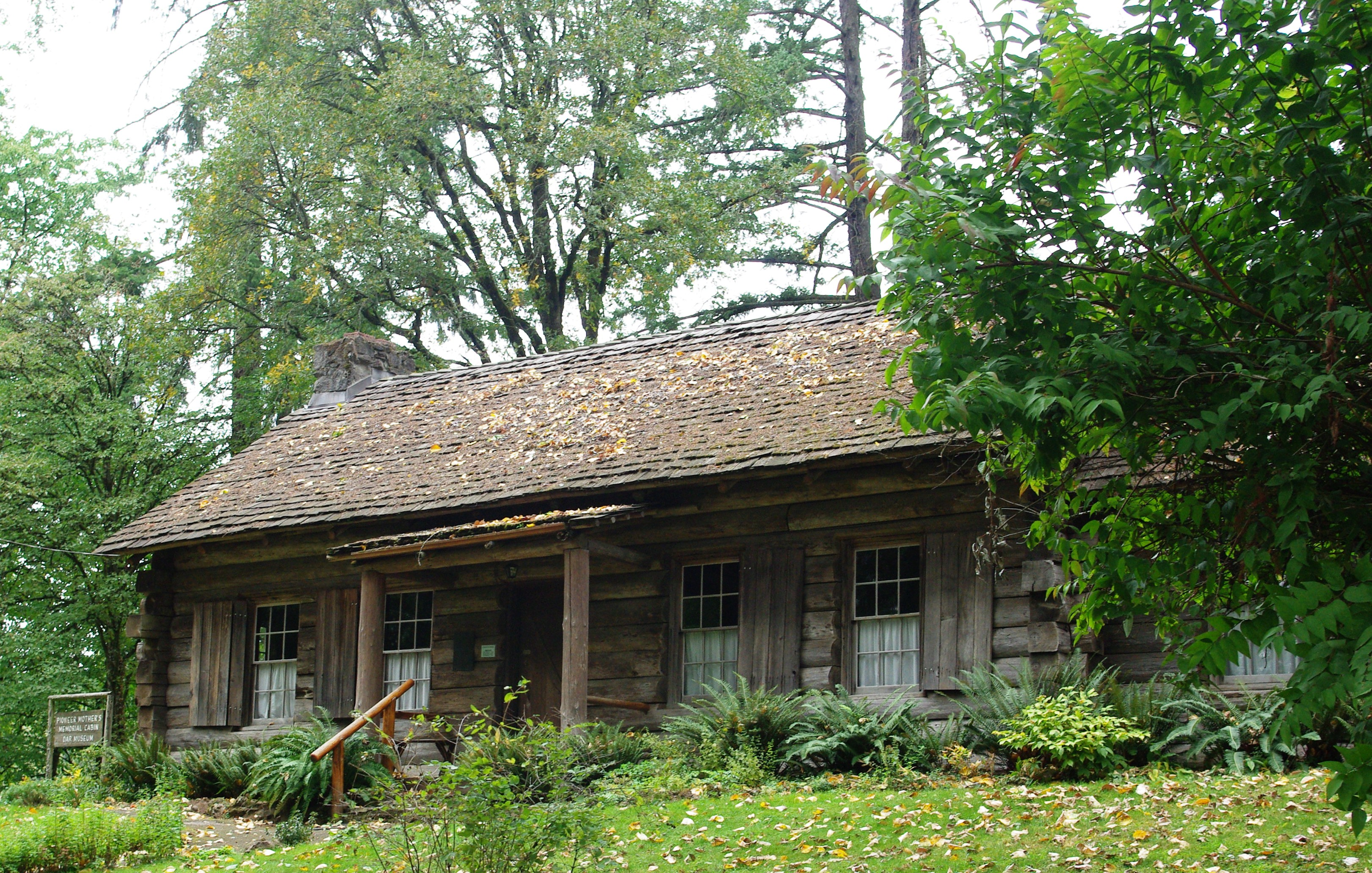
- Front of the cabin
- Established: 1931
- Location: 8089 Champoeg Rd NE, Champoeg, Oregon, United States
- Type: Historic house museum
- Website: http://newellpioneervillage.com/]

The Pioneer Mothers Memorial Cabin Museum is located six miles from St. Paul, Oregon, United States, next to the Champoeg State Heritage Area. The cabin was built by the Oregon State Society, Daughters of the American Revolution and opened in 1931 to honor early pioneer mothers.

The log cabin includes a main living room, two small bedrooms and a sleeping loft, and is representative of the type of log cabin built by early pioneers. The house has been furnished with authentic articles donated by the descendants of pioneer families, including a collapsible heating stove, weapons, mid-19th century decorations, china, glassware and furnishings.

Between 2013 and 2015 the Cabin was moved to the Newell Pioneer Village complex, next to the Newell House Museum.

== See also ==
- List of Oregon's Most Endangered Places
