= Delaney–Edwards House =

- Delaney--Edwards House
- U.S. National Register of Historic Places
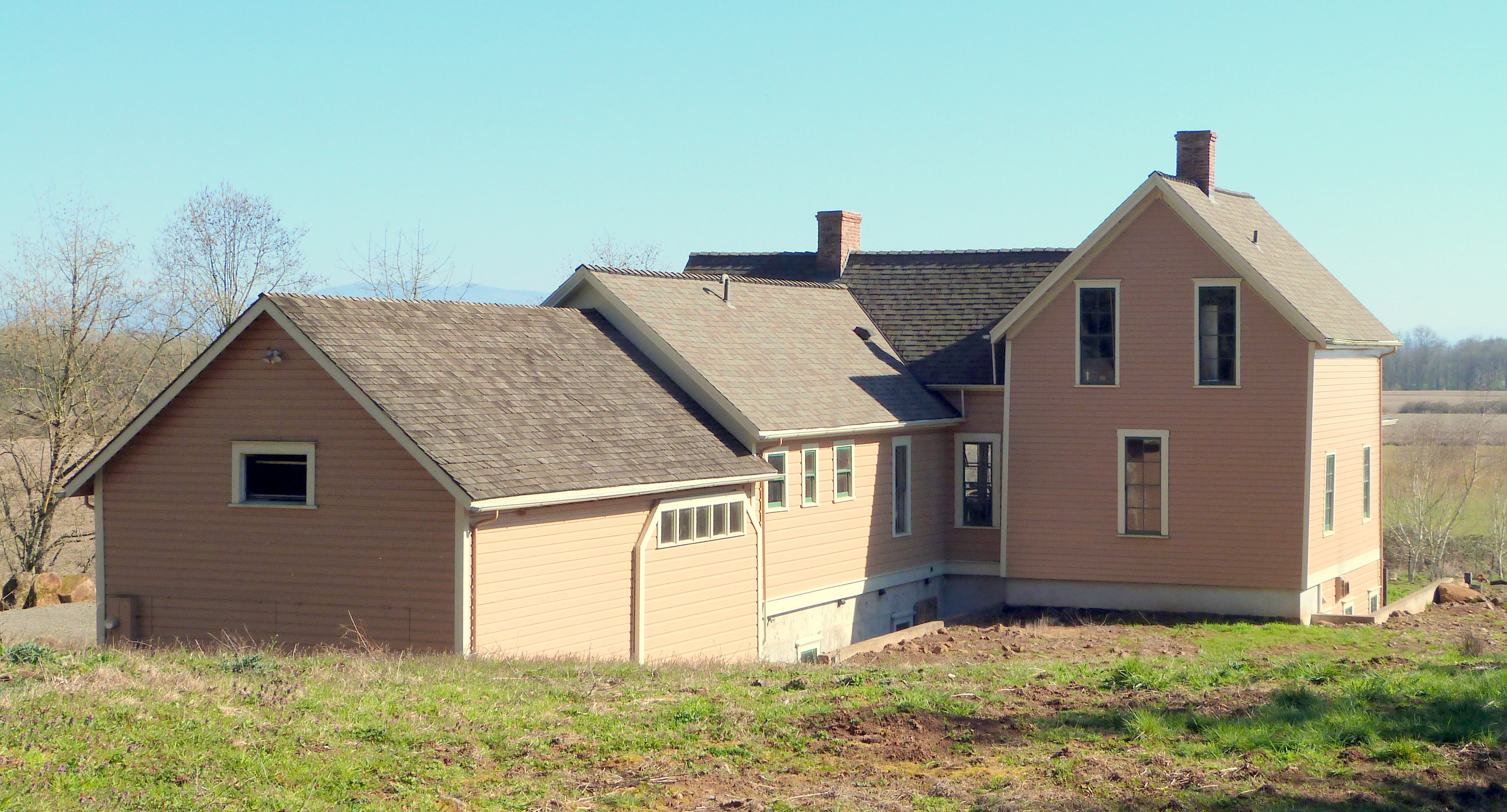

- Location within Oregon
- Nearest city: Salem, Oregon
- Coordinates: 44°50′35″N 122°58′19″W
- Area: less than one acre
- Built: 1845
- NRHP reference No.: 04000729
- Added to NRHP: July 23, 2004

Delaney–Edwards House is a historic inn in Salem, Oregon. Though it has a Salem address, it is located near Turner, Oregon.

It was built in 1845 and was added to the National Register of Historic Places on July 23, 2004. It is one of the 3 oldest houses in Oregon and is currently operated as a bed and breakfast.

The original portion of the farmhouse was constructed by Daniel Delaney along with his wife, Elizabeth (McGhee) Delaney. They arrived in Oregon as part of the Oregon Emigrating Company party of 1843.

== Design & construction ==
The house has a wooden frame structure.

== Events ==
=== Murder of Daniel Delaney ===
In 1865, a former employee of Daniel Delaney, George Beale, and his accomplice, George Baker, murdered Daniel Delaney by luring him out of the house and shooting him. They then ransacked the house, getting away with $1,400. The murder trial held was the first of its kind to be held in Salem. The court found both men guilty, and both Beale and Baker were executed via public hanging in front of thousands of spectators.

== See also ==
- List of the oldest buildings in Oregon
