= Charles Applegate House =

- U.S. National Register of Historic Places
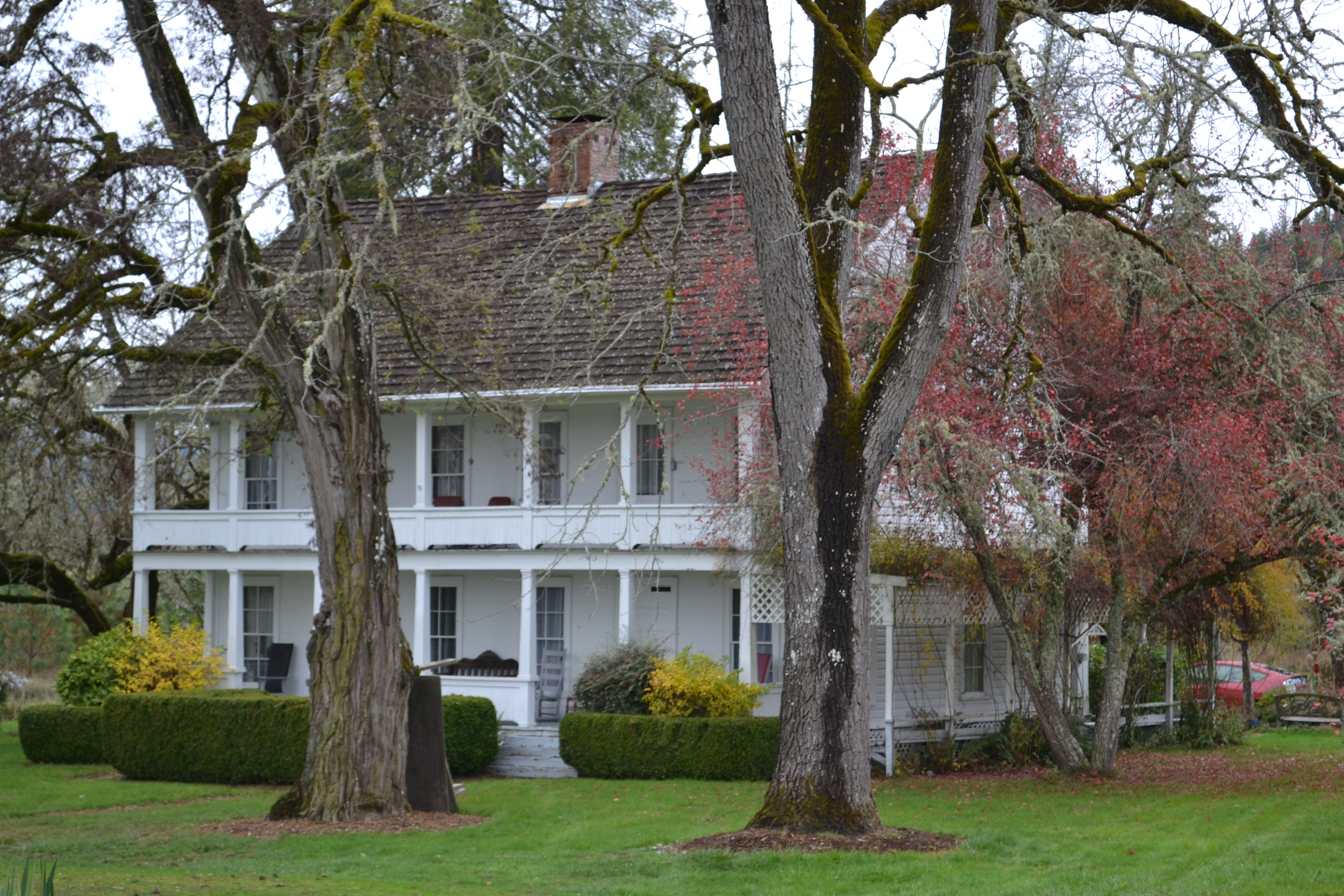

- Location within Oregon
- Nearest city: Yoncalla, Oregon
- Coordinates: 43°36′40″N 123°16′29″W
- Area: 5 acres (2.0 ha)
- Built: 1852
- Architectural style: Classical Revival, No Style Listed, Stick/eastlake
- NRHP reference No.: 75001583
- Added to NRHP: March 17, 1975

The Charles Applegate House is in Yoncalla, Oregon. The house was built in 1852 and was added to the National Register of Historic Places on March 17, 1975. The building features a Classical Revival style and Stick/Eastlake style. It is one of Oregon's oldest surviving buildings.

== See also ==
- List of the oldest buildings in Oregon
