= Cristom Vineyards =

Wine producer and vineyard in Oregon, US

Coordinates: 45.034775°N 123.120539°W

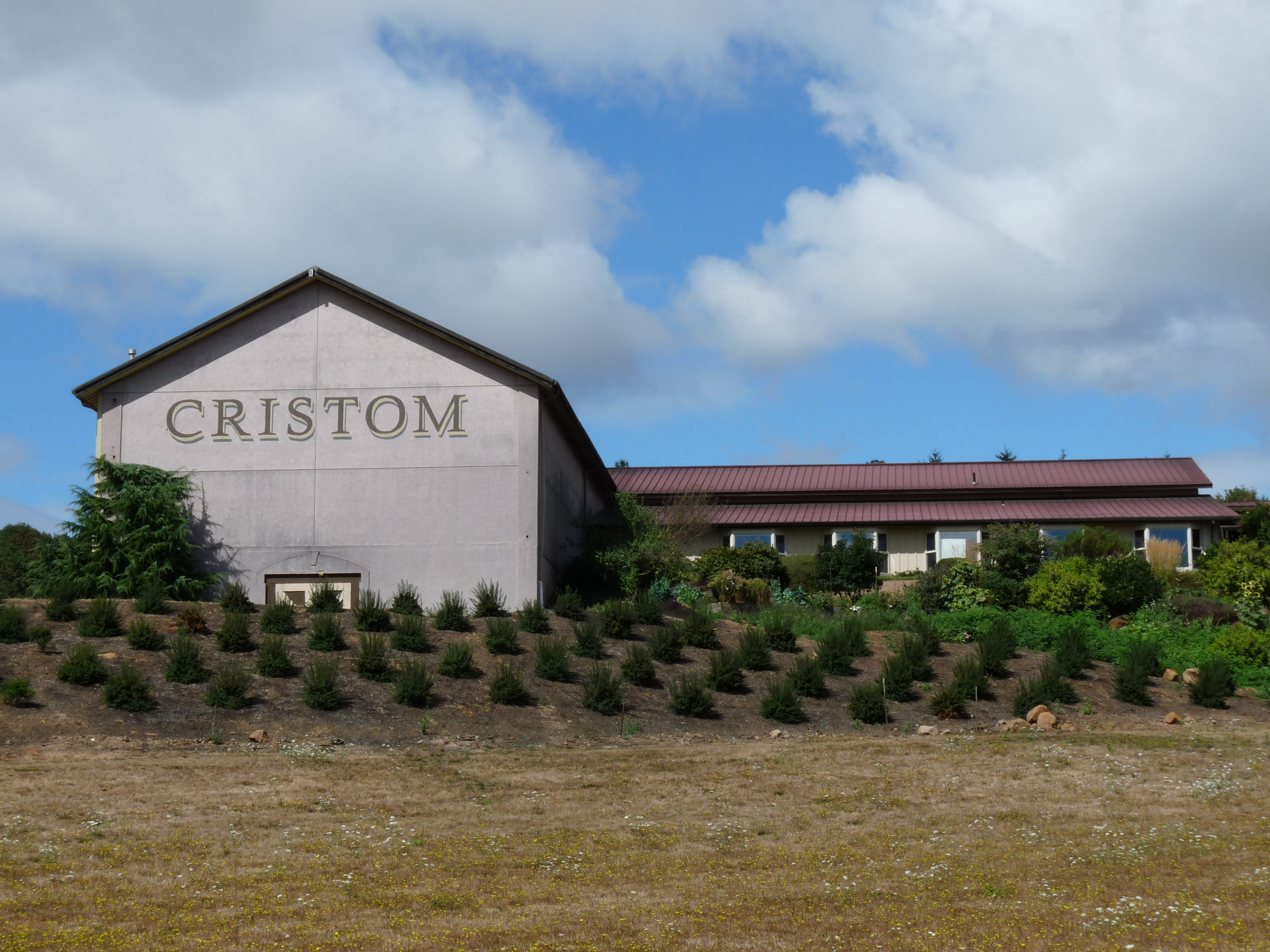
- Location: Salem, Oregon, United States of America
- Appellation: Eola-Amity Hills AVA
- Founded: 1992
- First vintage: 1992
- Key people: Tom Gerrie, winegrower & owner; Steve Doerner, winemaker
- Cases/yr: 19,000
- Known for: Pinot Noir
- Varietals: Pinot Noir, Pinot Gris, Viognier, Syrah, Chardonnay
- Website: www.cristomvineyards.com

Cristom Vineyards is an Oregon wine producer and vineyard based near Salem, U.S. It is in the Eola-Amity Hills wine region within the Willamette Valley AVA, about 6 miles (9.7 km) northwest of Keizer.

== History ==
Paul Gerrie, an engineer based in Pittsburgh, was searching for suitable land in North and South America to open a winery. Trips to France to pursue his passion for wine had exposed him to the French concept of terroir and its importance in Burgundy. He visited Oregon in 1991 for the International Pinot Noir Celebration and decided that it would be an ideal location. Mike Etzel, the owner of Beaux Frères, also in the Willamette Valley, was hired as a consultant to look for an appropriate location.

In 1992, Paul and Eileen Gerrie purchased the abandoned Pellier Winery site in the Spring Valley region of Polk County and established Cristom Vineyards. The existing vineyards were in a state of disrepair and all but one of them needed to be replanted. The first vintage was produced in 1992 from grapes purchased from other local vineyards. The vineyards were replanted from 1993 to 1996. with the first vintage from the estate owned vineyards bottled in 1994.

Cristom's current winemaker is Steve Doerner, who joined the winery as head winemaker for its first vintage. Doerner graduated in 1978 from the University of California, Davis with a degree in biochemistry and had spent 14 years at the Californian Calera Wine Company, specializing in working with Pinot noir, as well as studying under Jacques Seysses, owner and winemaker at Domaine Dujac in Burgundy before being appointed winemaker at Cristom in 1992. Doerner was the first established winemaker from the California wine industry to move to Oregon, and has been followed by many others since. After having established himself as winemaker at Cristom, Doerner was made a partner in the business.

The estate is named after Paul and Eileen Gerrie's children, being a portmanteau of Christine and Tom.

== Vineyards ==
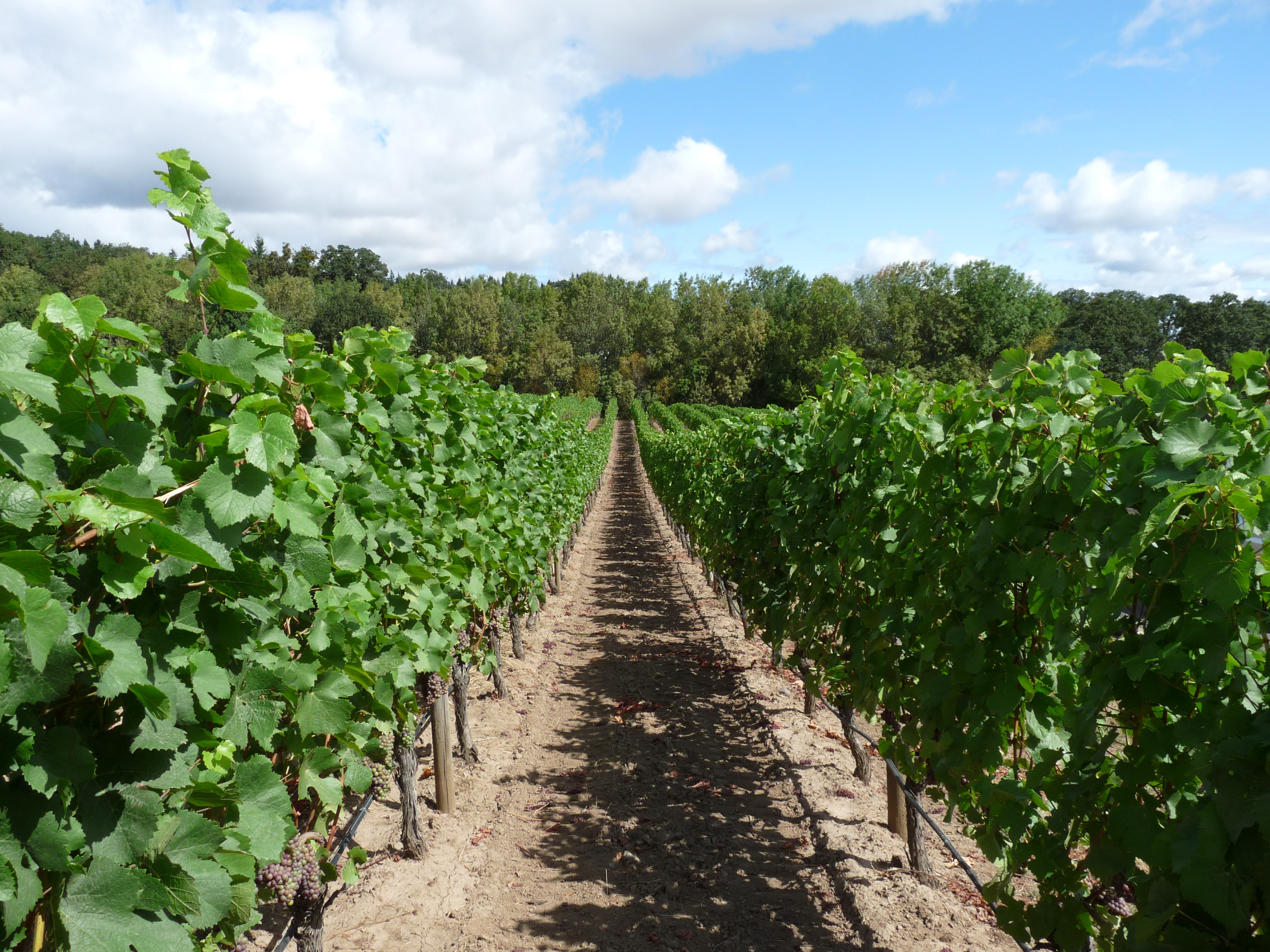
Vineyards at Cristom

Cristom has eight estate owned vineyards, with an area of 102.4 acres (41.4 ha). Six of the vineyards are named after family matriarchs.

Marjorie is the only vineyard that was not replanted in the years following the purchase of the winery. It is named after Paul Gerrie's mother. The vines were originally planted in 1982, and there are 8.5 acres (3.4 ha) of Pinot noir. The initial single vineyard wine from this location was from the 1994 vintage.

Louise is named after Paul Gerrie's maternal grandmother and was the first vineyard to finish being replanted with 9 acres (3.6 ha) of Pinot noir. The first single vineyard wine was the 1996 vintage.

Jessie is named for Paul Gerrie's paternal grandmother and was planted with 11.5 acres (4.7 ha) of Pinot noir in 1994. The first release was the 1998 vintage.

Eileen, is named after Paul Gerrie's wife, the co-founder and co-owner of the estate. This is the highest elevation Cristom vineyard which slopes from 550 to 700 feet (170 to 210 m). 16.6 acres (6.7 ha) of Pinot noir were planted in 1997 in this vineyard. The first vintage released was in 2000.

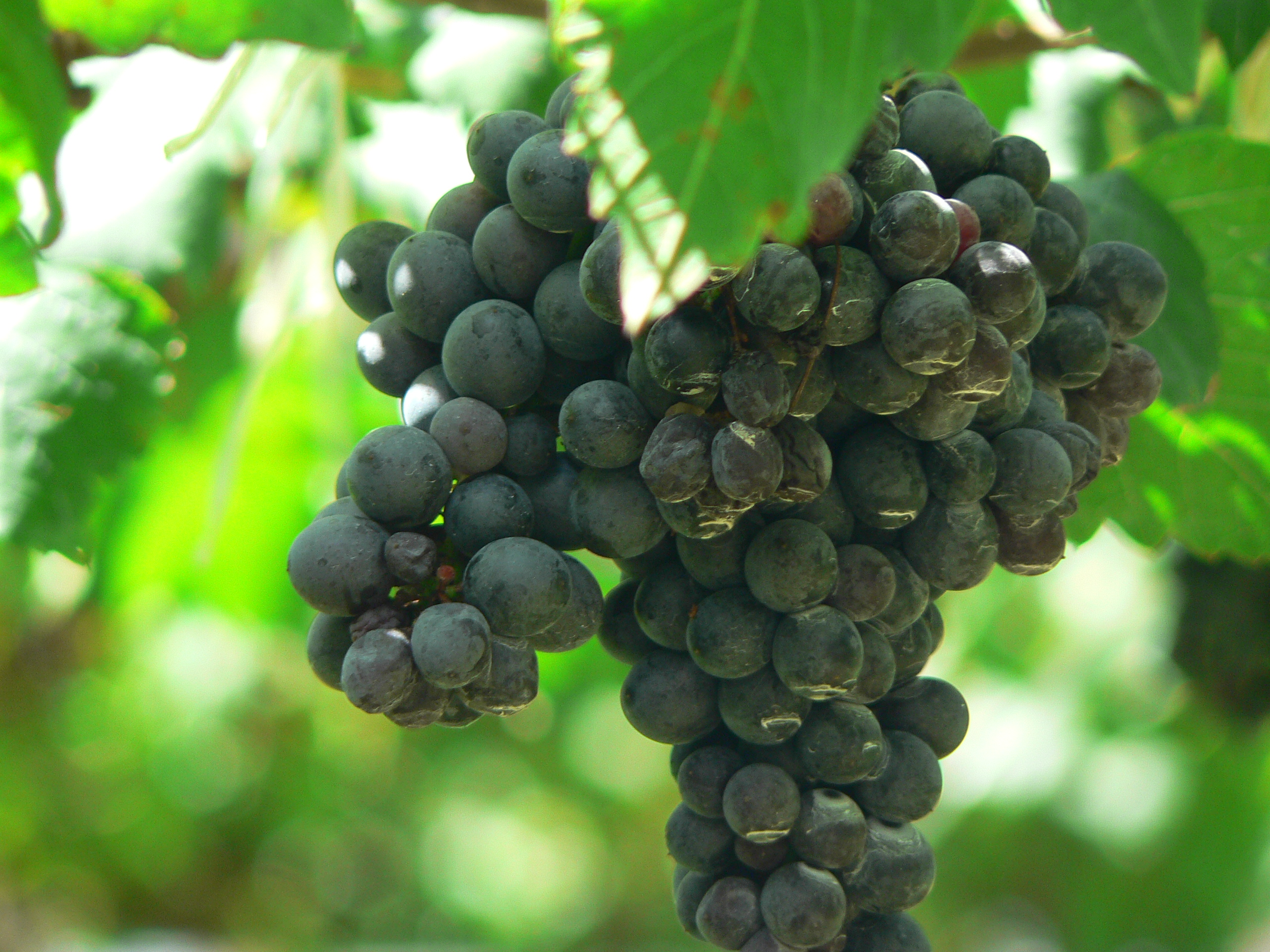
Cristom is one of the few Willamette Valley producers growing Syrah.

Two other vineyards are planted at the estate with Northern Rhone varieties that are unusual for the Willamette Valley region which is primarily known for Pinot noir. These are a 2.25 acres (0.91 ha) Viognier vineyard planted in 1993 and a 1.25 acres (0.51 ha) Syrah vineyard planted in 2002. Cristom is described as a pioneer of these varieties in this region.

== Wines ==
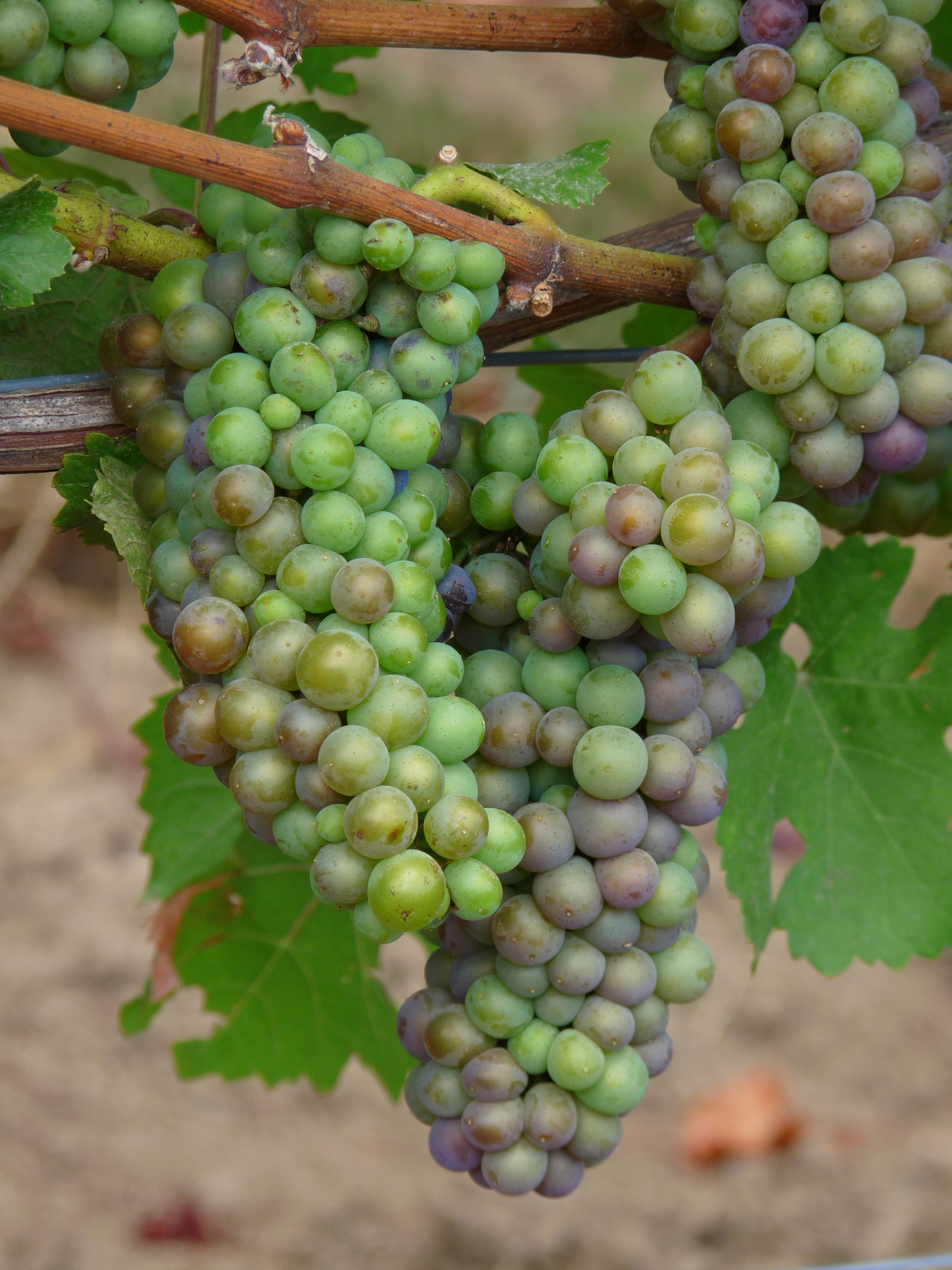
Pinot noir grapes at Cristom Vineyard

Cristom is best known for its Pinot noir based wines. Four single vineyard wines are produced with Pinot noir grapes from the vineyards Marjorie, Louise, Jessie and Eileen.

Cristom also produces a Pinot noir blends, the Mount Jefferson Cuvee named after a mountain visible from the winery. The Mount Jefferson Cuvee is a blend from ten different vineyards, with the best barrels of the blend being separated to be bottled as the Sommers Reserve wine. Around 3,500 cases of the Mount Jefferson and 1,250 cases of the "Sommers" Reserve are produced each year.

In addition to Pinot noir, Cristom also produces a Syrah based red wine from the estate vineyard.

White wines are produced from three varieties: a single vineyard Chardonnay as well as Pinot gris and Viognier.

Around 18,000 cases of wine are produced each vintage, with about 1,500 of that total being white wines.
