= John Phillips House =

Historic house in Oregon, United States

Coordinates: 45.027686°N 123.125925°W

- U.S. National Register of Historic Places
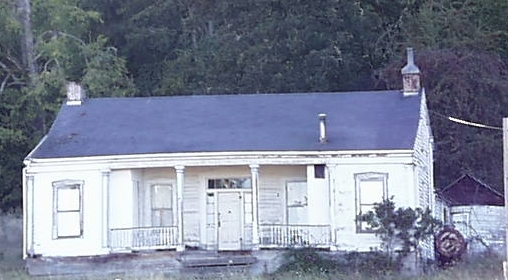

- Location within Oregon Location within the United States
- Location: 6565 Spring Valley Rd. NW; Salem, Oregon
- Nearest city: Salem, Oregon
- Built: 1853
- Architectural style: Classical Revival/Greek Revival
- NRHP reference No.: 76001588
- Added to NRHP: March 15, 1976

John Phillips House is a historic 1853 vernacular Greek Revival house in the Spring Valley area of Polk County, Oregon, United States. It was built for pioneer John Phillips, who came to Oregon via the Oregon Trail in 1845. He finished his journey to Oregon on the Meek Cutoff as part of Stephen Meek's "lost wagon train".

John Phillips, born in 1814, was a native of Wiltshire England who came to the U.S. in 1834 and settled in Florida. After living in New Orleans—where he met and married Elizabeth Hibbard in 1839—and St. Louis, he came to Oregon and bought the Turner donation land claim in Polk County for $100. The locale was once known as Spring Valley Ranch. John Phillips hired carpenter Samuel Coad to build a house for him there.

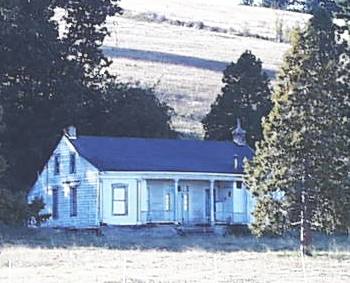
Three-quarter view of house showing the Eola Hills rising behind it

Samuel Coad served during the Cayuse War in 1855, and helped construct buildings at Fort Hoskins, including one commissioned by then-Lieutenant Philip Sheridan, which was moved near the community of Pedee. Also known as the Condron House, the Philip Sheridan House has been returned to the Fort Hoskins site and is being restored. Samuel Coad married the daughter of General Cornelius Gilliam, Henrietta, in 1853. Coad also constructed the woolen mill at Ellendale.

As of 1980, the John Phillips House was the oldest residence in Polk County and was still in the Phillips family. The 1 1/2-story house has horizontal wood siding.

The house has a Salem mailing address, but the closest settlement is the unincorporated community of Zena about a mile to the southwest. John Phillips is buried in the Zena Cemetery at Spring Valley Presbyterian Church.
