= Joel Redon =

American novelist

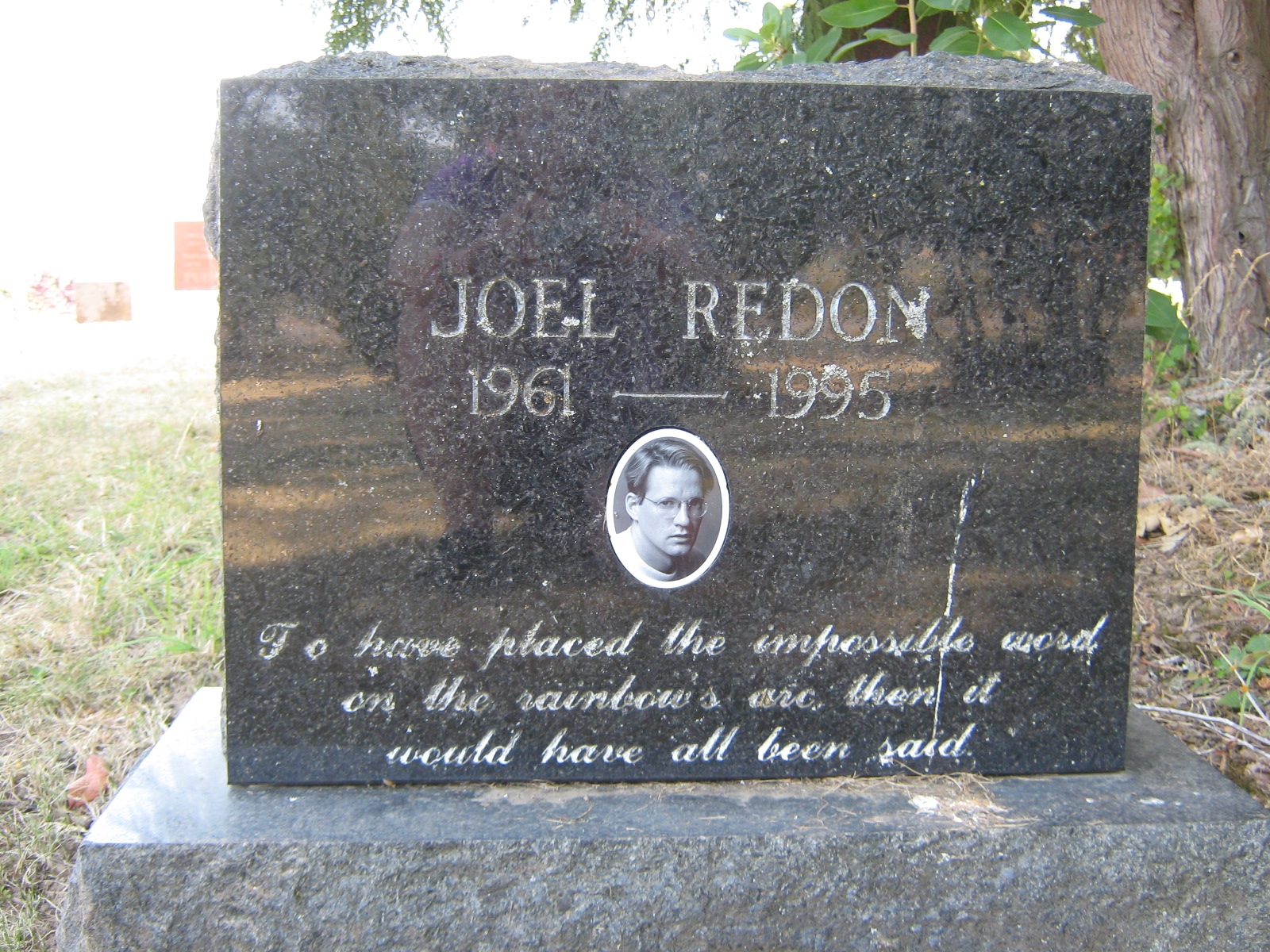
Joel Redon's grave at Spring Valley cemetery in Zena, Oregon

Joel Redon (November 15, 1961 – June 6, 1995) was an American author from Oregon.

== Early life and education ==
Redon was born Bruce Randolph Didzun in Portland, Oregon. Redon studied writing at New York University and with Paul Bowles at The American School of Tangier in Morocco. While in New York, Redon wrote for the Village Voice.

Redon was befriended by M. F. K. Fisher, to whom he would send manuscripts. Her praise for Redon's The Road to Zena is printed on the book's jacket. They kept up a 6-year correspondence.

Redon was photographed by Robert Giard as part of his project of photographing hundreds of LGBT writers. Giard's photo of Redon was published in the collection of Giard's photos Particular Voices: Portraits of Gay and Lesbian Writers.

== Works ==
His first novel, Bloodstream (1989) is an autobiographical novel about a young man with AIDS who returns to his family in Oregon. A chapter of the book was included in Confronting AIDS Through Literature: The Responsibilities of Representation edited by Judith Lawrence Pastore.

His second and third novels, If Not on Earth, Then in Heaven (1991) and The Road to Zena (1992) were based on his family's history. Heaven tells the story of his ancestor Neoma Matthews. The Road to Zena is a fictionalized account of his great-grandparents who lived in Zena, Oregon. A selection from Zena was included in Reading Portland edited by John Trombold and Peter Donahue.

Redon planned to write a series of four novels about his ancestors.

== Later life and death ==
Joel Redon was diagnosed with AIDS in 1986.

He died at age 33 of complications of AIDS in Sonoma County, California. He has a square in the AIDS Memorial Quilt.

He is buried in the cemetery of the Spring Valley Presbyterian Church (Zena Church) in Zena.
