= John Sweek House =

Historic house in Oregon, United States

- U.S. National Register of Historic Places
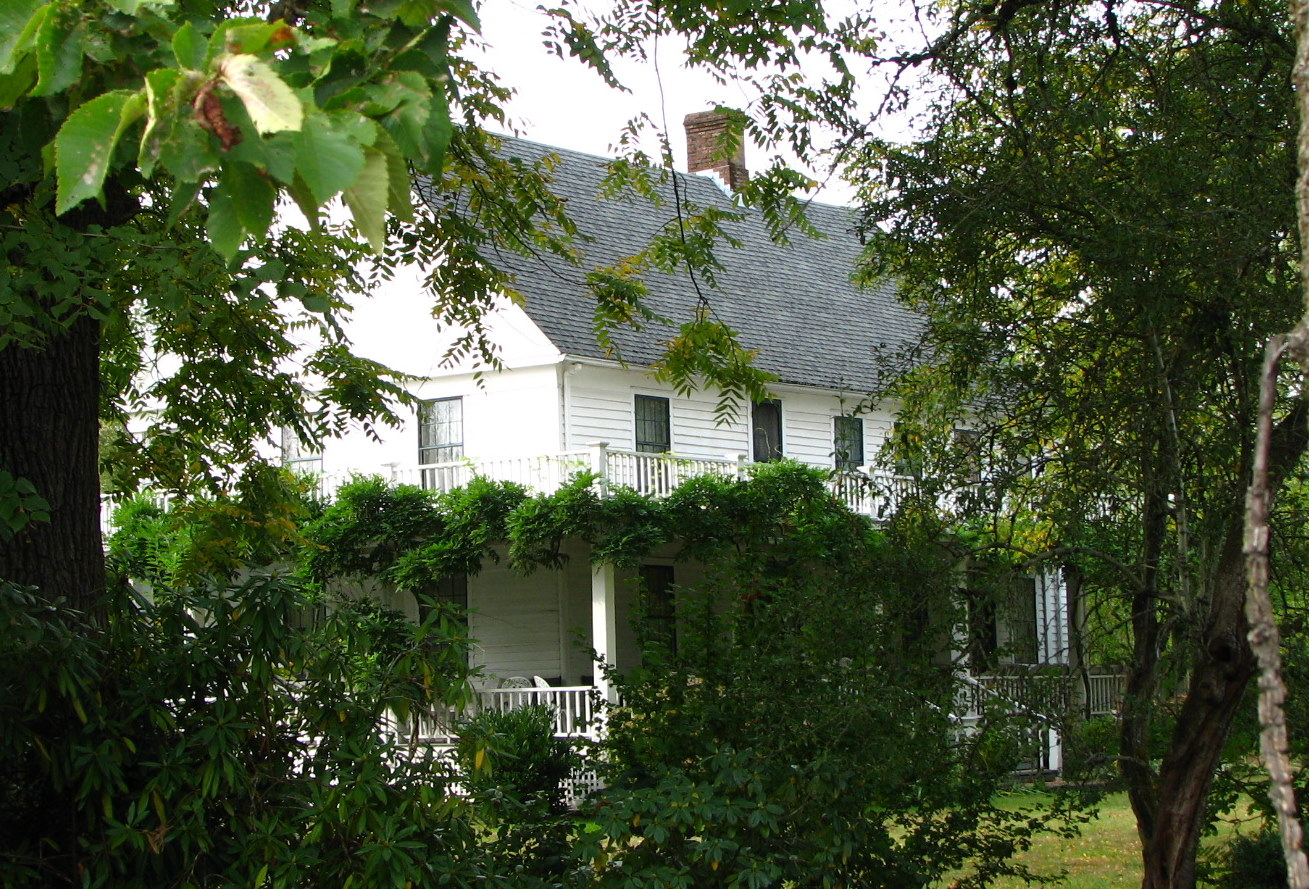
- The Sweek House in 2008

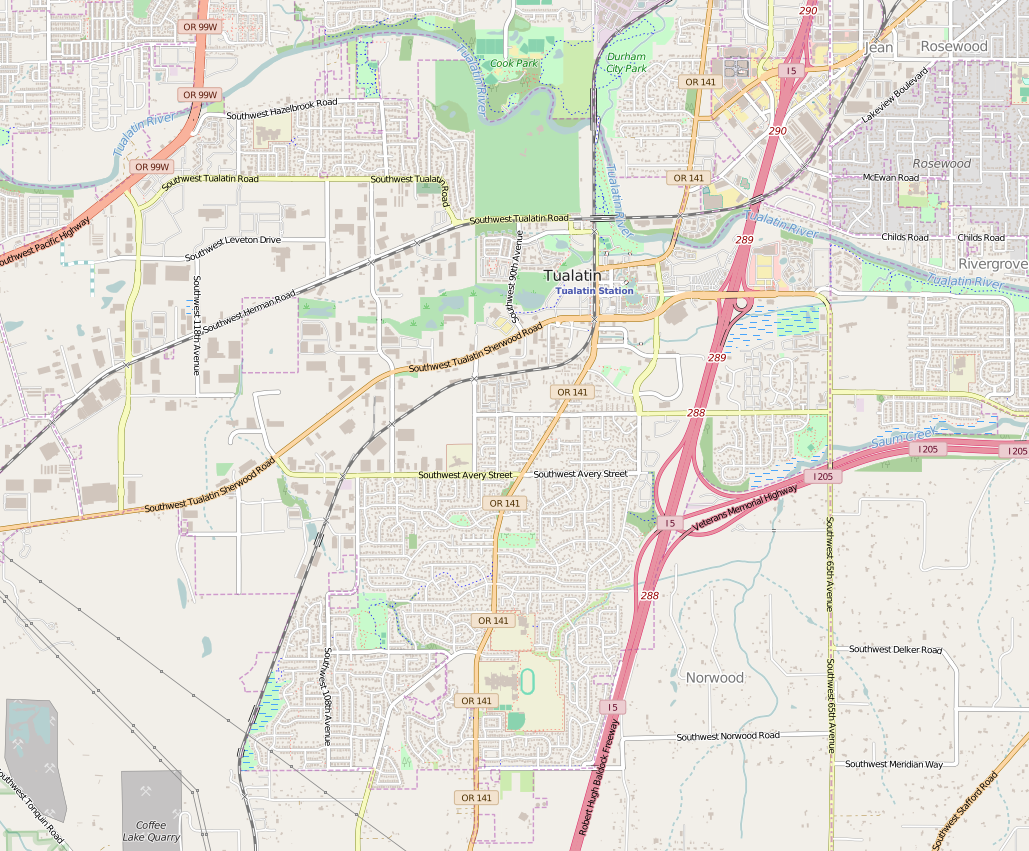
- Location within Tualatin OR
- Location: 18815 SW Boones Ferry Road; Tualatin, Oregon
- Coordinates: 45°23′03″N 122°45′54″W
- Area: 3 acres (1.2 ha)
- Built: 1858
- Architectural style: Classical Revival
- NRHP reference No.: 74001724
- Added to NRHP: November 8, 1974

The John Sweek House, also originally known as Willowbrook, is a historic residence in Tualatin, Oregon, United States. Construction began in 1858 for John Sweek, who donated the land for Tualatin's original townsite. While the house is named after Sweek, his wife Maria managed the construction; Sweek had been off in Idaho for six years.

The house was listed on the National Register of Historic Places in 1974.

== See also ==
- National Register of Historic Places listings in Washington County, Oregon
