= West University, Eugene, Oregon =

Neighborhood in Eugene, Oregon, U.S.

Coordinates: 44.044°N 123.083°W

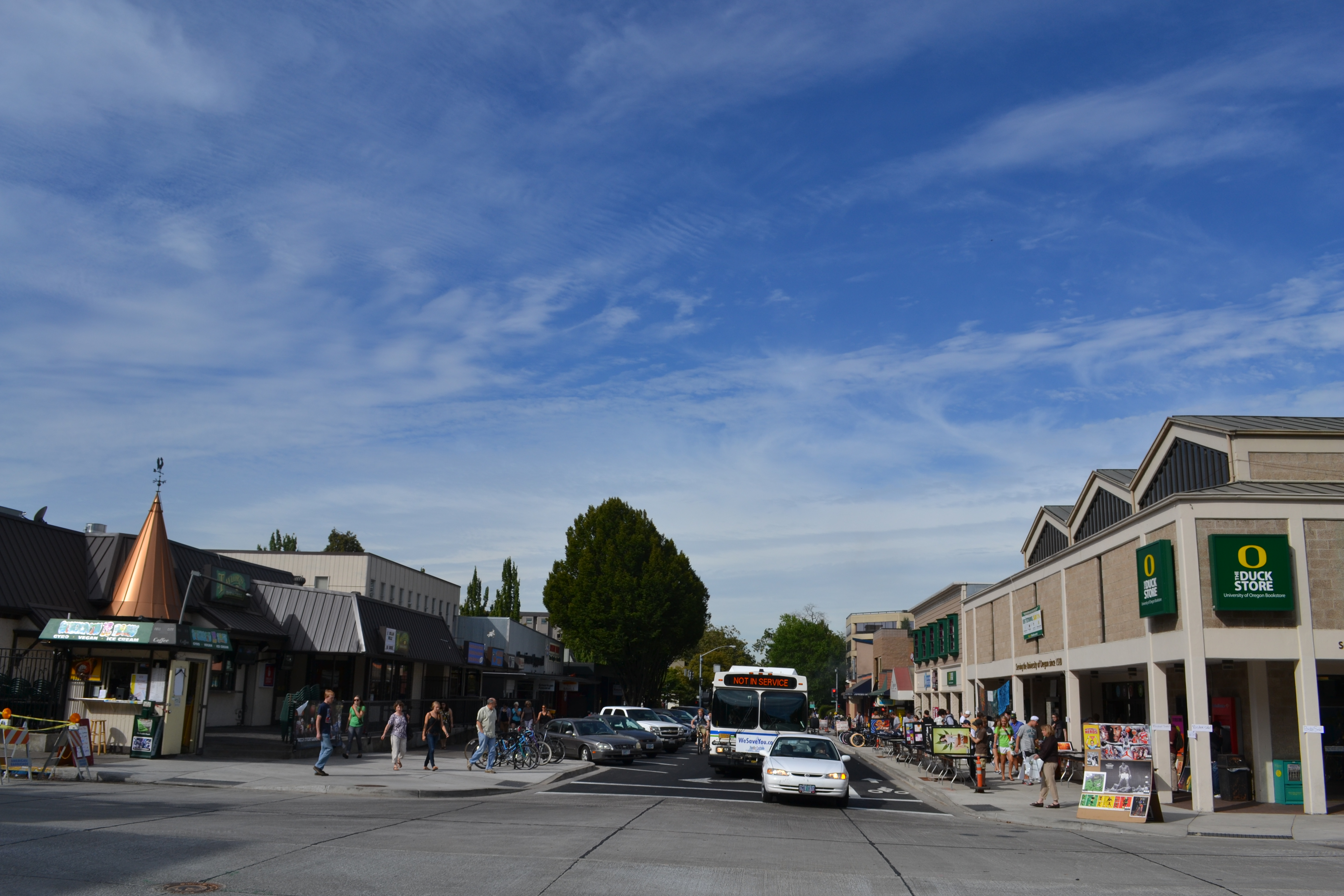
13th Avenue as seen from Kincaid Street

The West University Neighborhood (WUN) is a neighborhood in Eugene, Oregon, United States immediately west of the University of Oregon. The neighborhood encompasses the area west from Kincaid Street to Willamette Street, and north from East 19th Avenue to Franklin Boulevard. 97% of the residences in the neighborhood are renter-occupied. The area has been known in the past as a site of several student riots, most notably in 1998, 2001 and 2002, and has also seen several beautification and improvement efforts over the years.

== Neighborhood association ==
The WUN neighborhood association was not active for nearly 10 years when it was reformed in 2003.

== Park ==
West University Park, designed in 1979 by students of the university's landscape architecture department and built by students and neighbors, was closed in 1995 because of problems with drug dealing and other crimes. Originally located in the center of the block on East 14th Avenue between Hilyard and Patterson, it is the only park in the 64-block neighborhood. It is also the only Eugene city park that has ever been closed. Plans were made to reopen the park starting in 2007, and it reopened in May 2009 in a slightly different location. A land swap with a property owner adjacent to the park allowed it to be moved to the corner of 14th and Hilyard, which provides better visibility for law enforcement.

== Public safety ==
In order to increase safety in the area, WUN is one of four neighborhoods in the city that has a public safety station staffed by the Eugene Police Department.
