= Watson–Price Farmstead =

Historic house in Philomath, Oregon, US

Watson-Price Farmstead
- Interactive map of the Watson-Price Farmstead area
- Alternative names: Watson, James and Mary, Farmstead

General information
- Architectural style: Greek Revival
- Location: Philomath, Oregon
- Coordinates: 44.674059°N 123.444667°W
- Completed: 1852
- Cost: $2,500 (Gold)

Design and construction
- Architect: William Pitman

The Watson-Price Farmstead is a historic building located in Philomath, Oregon. The house was built in 1852, and is the only remaining home built by William Pitman. The house is built in a Greek Revival style.

== History ==
James Watson was born in 1808 in Mason County, Kentucky. In 1833, he married Mary Ridgeway. Watson arrived in Oregon in 1847, just a few months before Benton County, Oregon was established. Watson served as a County Commissioner from 1852 to 1855.

The Farmstead was built by William Pitman in 1852 and is the last remaining home Pitman built in Kings Valley. The Watson family is said to have built a temporary house behind the current location of the home upon their arrival in Benton County. The house took six months to complete and was paid for in gold totaling $2,500.

== Architecture ==
The Watson-Price Farmstead was built in the Greek Revival architectural style, and currently exists in its historic form with only repairs to the roof and foundation since its construction. The home was built using Box construction techniques, commonly used for dwellings in 1840-1880. The property has been used as a farm since it was first developed in 1848.

== Additional structures ==
The Watson-Price Farmstead also features additional structures:

- Cold Storage Building
- Wood Shed
- Smoke House
- Out House
- Chicken House
- Blacksmith Shop
- Machine Shed
