= Molalla Log House =

Historic cabin in Oregon, United States

General information
- Architectural style: Log cabin
- Coordinates: 45°14′51″N 122°31′27″W

Technical details
- Material: Douglas Fir logs
- Size: 450 sq ft (42 m^{2})

The Molalla Log House, or the David Fox Granary, is a historic log cabin originally located in Molalla, Oregon, United States. It represents perhaps the oldest extant building in Oregon if not the Pacific Northwest, built c. 1790.

== History ==
Architectural historians Gregg Olson and Pam Hayden theorize that the cabin was built around the turn of the 19th century by Russian colonists. In 1892, the whole building was dismantled and moved from its original site, the so-called Wildcat Site. It was named the David Fox Granary on Clackamas County's 1984 Historic Resources Inventory. It became an object of deeper study in 1984.

== See also ==
- Russian colonization of the Americas
