= Zena, Oregon =

Coordinates: 45°00′31″N 123°7′46″W

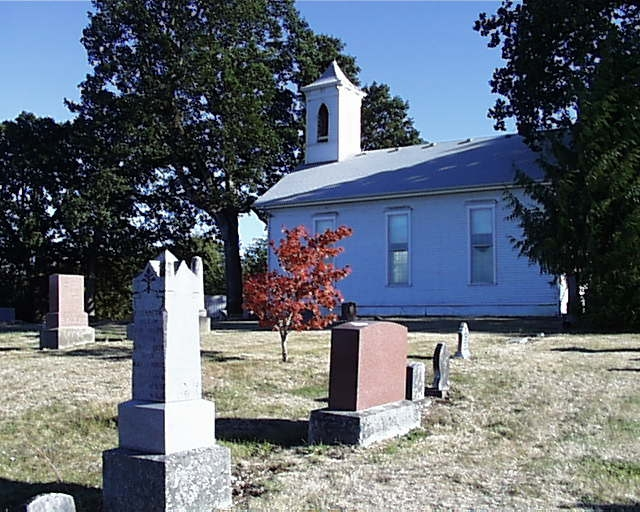
Spring Valley Presbyterian Church and cemetery

Zena, Oregon is a former community (now considered a ghost town) approximately 10 miles (16 km) northwest of Salem, Oregon, United States, in Polk County. The community was established in 1858, originally called "Spring Valley". It was renamed "Zena" by Daniel Jackson Cooper and his brother Jacob Calvin Cooper, pioneers from Missouri. In 1866, they built a store and located the post office there, renaming the community in tribute to their wives, Arvazena Spilman Cooper and Melzena Spilman Cooper, who were sisters. Zena is home to the historic Spring Valley Presbyterian Church. The 1992 novel, The Road to Zena by Joel Redon, is set in Zena and nearby Lincoln.

== Arvazena Cooper ==
Arvazena was born in 1846 in Cherokee County, North Carolina. She spent many years in Missouri and married Daniel Jackson Cooper in May 1861. Two years later, the family moved west and settled in Oregon's Willamette Valley. She and her husband had 15 children born in Missouri, Oregon and on the journey to Oregon. Arvazena died in 1929 and is buried in The Dalles, Oregon.

According to Arvazena Cooper:

Grandpa [Elbert Emmerson Cooper] went over into Polk County during this week and got a place to stop at from Bolivar Walker. Afterward he bought a place from Nels Walling, paying for it with his outfit he crossed the plains with. It was at a place afterwards called Zena, near a church where Grandpa preached for several years."

== See also ==
- John Phillips House
- List of ghost towns in Oregon
- Spring Valley (Oregon)
