= Newell Pioneer Village =

Coordinates: 45.249288°N 122.896747°W

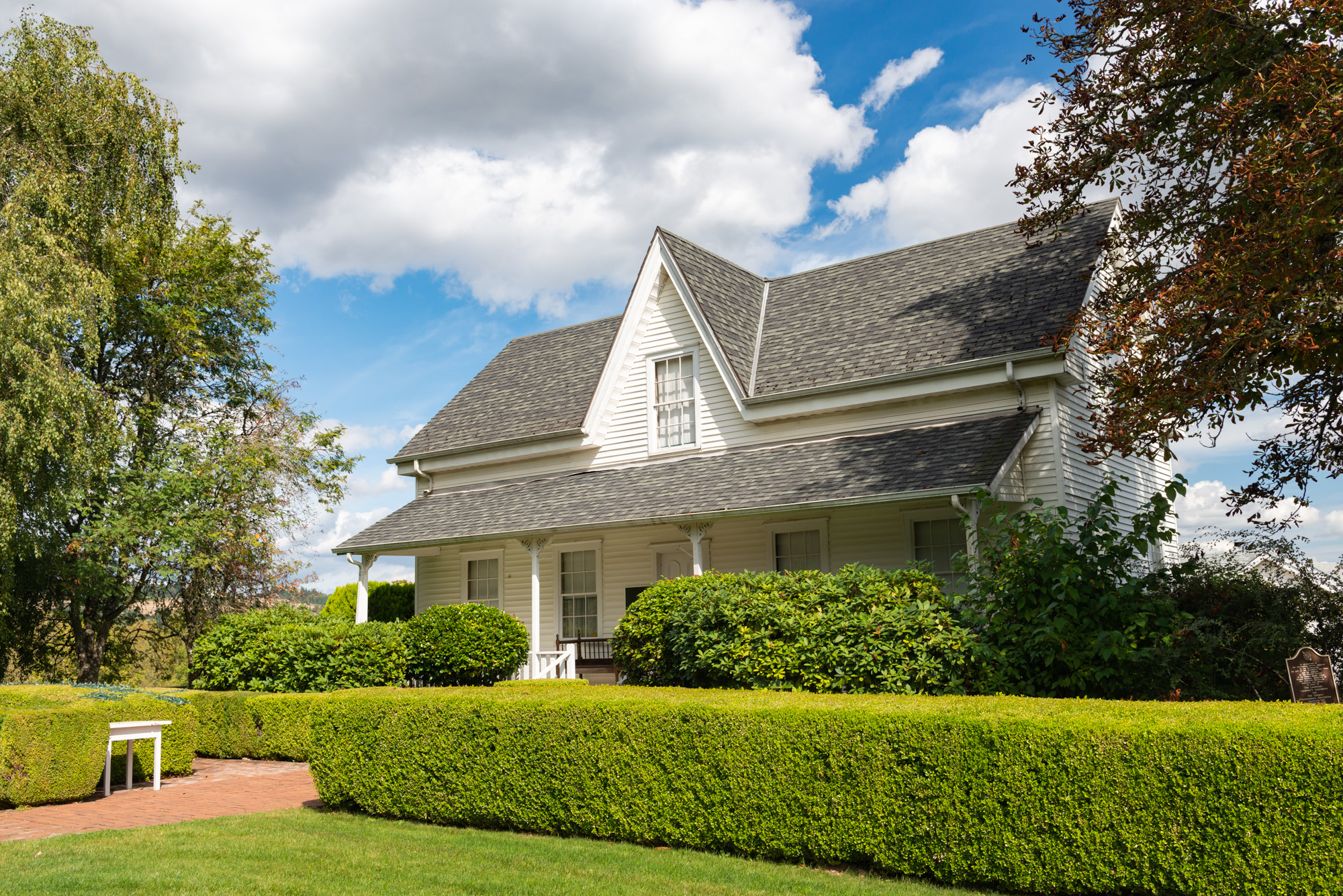
Robert Newell House

The Newell Pioneer Village which includes the Newell House Museum (aka the Robert Newell House), is located in Champoeg, Oregon, United States. Built by Oregon politician Dr. Robert Newell in 1852, the house was acquired in 1952 by the Oregon State Society, Daughters of the American Revolution. The house was reconstructed and opened as a museum in 1959.

== House ==
Dr. Newell's house was the only one that survived the Great Flood of 1861 that destroyed the town of Champoeg.

== Museum complex ==
The museum includes 19th century furnishings and decorations, including quilts, textiles, and handcrafts, antique firearms, gowns worn by the wives of Oregon's Governors at their inaugural balls, West Coast Native American blankets, Robert Newell's Masonic paraphernalia, and spinning equipment and looms.

An 1849 jail and an 1858 schoolhouse were moved to the property from Butteville in 1959. The schoolhouse includes the teacher's living quarters and the schoolroom. In 2013, the Pioneer Mothers Memorial Cabin Museum was also moved to the property, restored, and reopened in 2015.

The complex includes a garden and is part of the Champoeg State Heritage Area. It is still run the Oregon State Society, Daughters of the American Revolution. The complex is open from March to October.
