= Champoeg, Oregon =

Town in Oregon, United States

- Ghost town
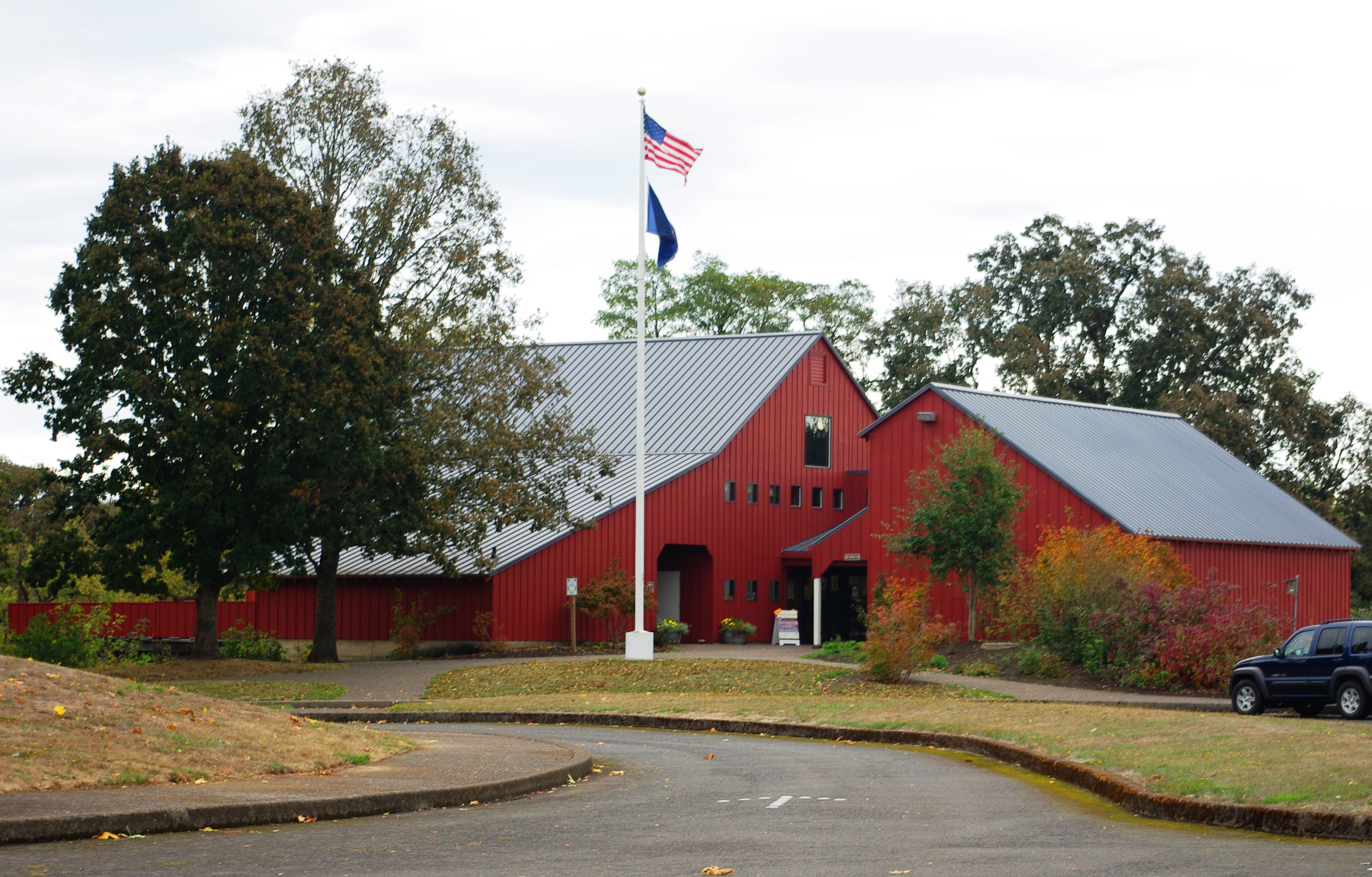
- Museum at the state heritage area

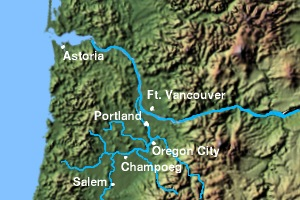
- Location near neighboring cities

- Location within Oregon Location within the United States
- Coordinates: 45°14′56″N 122°53′49″W
- Country: United States
- State: Oregon
- County: Marion
- Time zone: UTC-8 (Pacific (PST))
  - Summer (DST): UTC-7 (PDT)
- ZIP code: 97137
- Area codes: 503 and 971

Champoeg (/ʃæmˈpuːiː/ sham-POO-ee, historically /ʃæmˈpuːɛɡ/ sham-POO-eg) is a former town in the U.S. state of Oregon. Now a ghost town, it was an important settlement in the Willamette Valley in the early 1840s. Located halfway between Oregon City and Salem, it was the site of the first provisional government of the Oregon Country.

The town site is on the south bank of the Willamette River in northern Marion County, on French Prairie, approximately 5 mi (8.0 km) southeast of Newberg. The town is now part of Champoeg State Heritage Area, an Oregon state park. The Champoeg State Park Historic Archeological District is within the heritage area.

The name "Champoeg" comes from the Kalapuyan word [čʰámpuik], which might be an abbreviation of [čʰa-čʰíma-púičuk], referring to the edible root [púičuk], or yampa.

== History ==
Champoeg is best known as the site of a series of meetings held in the town during the 1840s. On February 7, 1841, Willamette Valley settlers convened there for the first time. They selected Oregon missionary Jason Lee as their chairman and considered measures to deal with the problem of wolves menacing their settlements. It was to be the first in a series of "Wolf Meetings" at the town site that would establish the basis of civil codes.

By the middle 1840s, the question of the possession of the disputed Oregon Country between the United States and the United Kingdom began to loom large. On May 2, 1843, a meeting was held at the town to determine whether a provisional government should be established. The measure passed by 52 to 50. A group of nine representatives was named to create a provisional government with Champoeg as its capital. A petition to the United States Congress was drafted and sent to Washington, D.C., with William Gilpin, who had helped draft the petition and came to the Willamette Valley with the expedition of John C. Frémont. On his journey eastward to deliver the petition, Gilpin evangelized for the settlement of the Pacific Northwest, helping to spread "Oregon fever". He presented the petition to Congress in 1845. The question of possession of the Oregon Country was settled the following year in the 1846 Oregon Treaty. When the Oregon Territory was organized in 1848, however, Champoeg was not chosen as the capital.

Around 1852 the town had grown to include a ferry across the Willamette, a warehouse owned by Francis Pettygrove and Alanson Beers, a steamboat landing, a granary owned by the Hudson's Bay Company, and a stagecoach office. There were 10 north–south streets and six east–west streets laid out in the community. Champoeg was also the crossroads of the Champoeg-St. Paul Road, Champoeg-Salem Road, Champoeg-Oregon City Road, and the Champoeg-DeGuire's Ferry Road. Most of the town was located on the Donation Land Claims of Robert Newell and André Longtain.

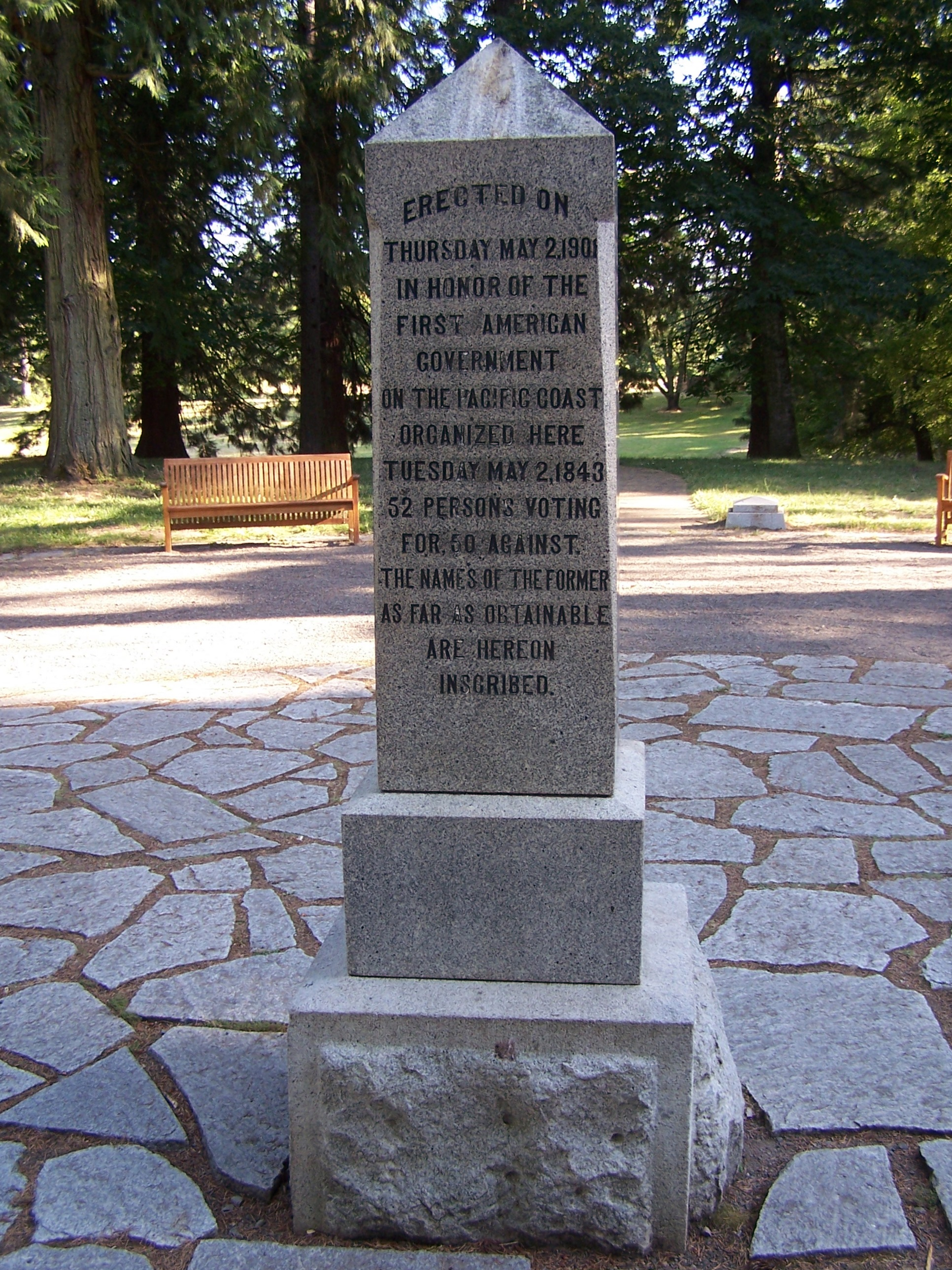
The 1901 monument in Champoeg marking the spot where the first American government on the Pacific Coast was organized.

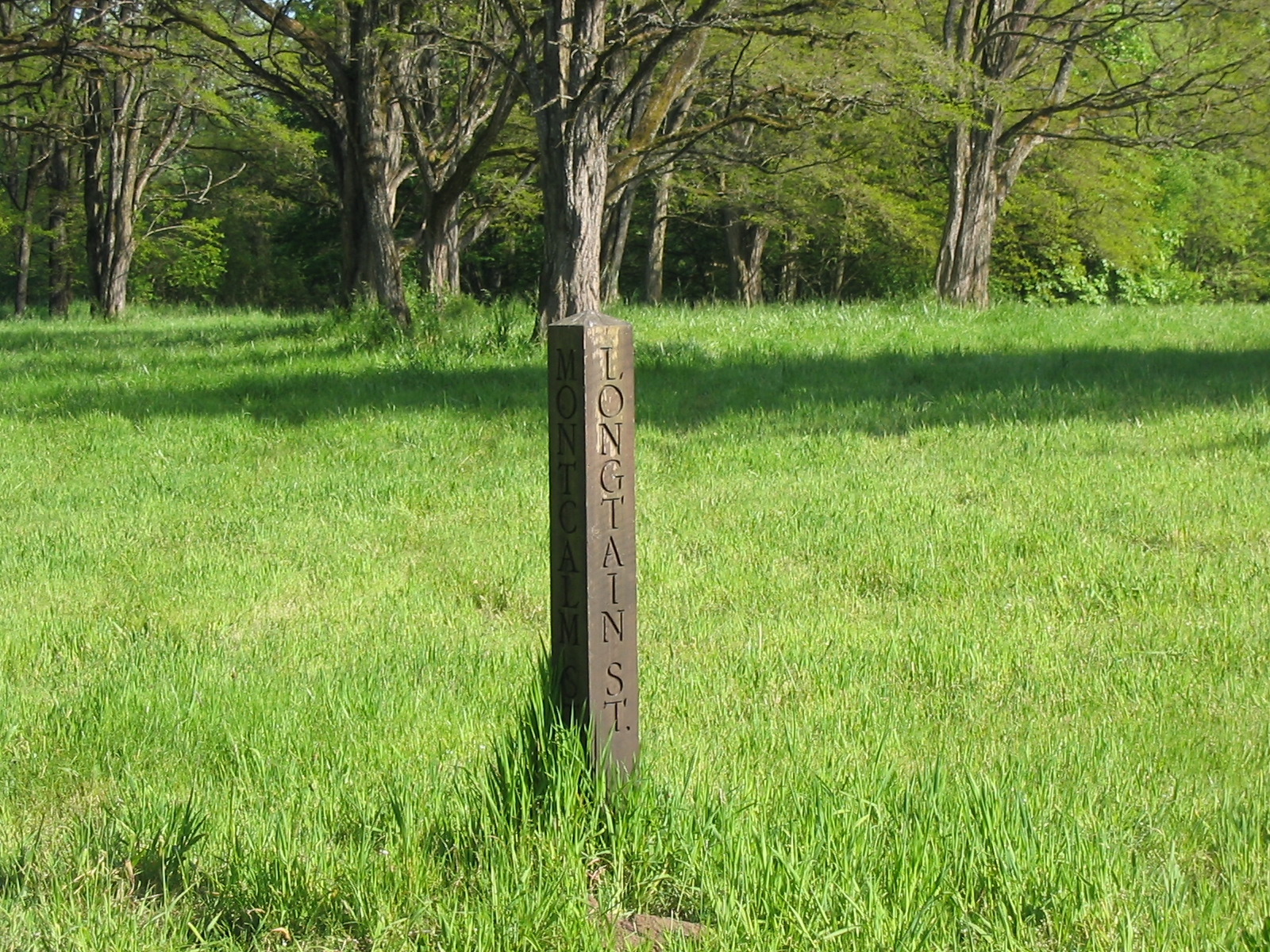
A stake marks the former location of a street corner in Champoeg.

The town continued to exist after Oregon statehood. However, on December 2, 1861, the adjacent Willamette River rose 55 feet (17 m) above its normal summer stage, flooding the town with seven feet (2.1 m) of water. The great flood destroyed most of the structures in the town, barring two saloons. Panicked residents found shelter at the Newell House, which was built upon a hill. Robert Newell went nearly bankrupt in caring for the flood victims. Champoeg was never rebuilt after the disaster. The town site is now preserved as Champoeg State Heritage Area. A 1901 monument records the names of the 52 settlers who voted to establish the provisional government at the 1843 meeting. Dams installed since the 1930s make another catastrophic flood unlikely.

== Champoeg State Heritage Area ==
Amenities of the heritage area include a visitor center, an 1860s-style garden, the Newell House Museum – Robert Newell's restored 1852 house – and the Pioneer Mothers Memorial Cabin Museum.

Also located in the park is the Historic Butteville Store, which was founded in 1863. Considered the oldest operating store in Oregon, it is the last remaining commercial building of the nearby community of Butteville. A series of weekend interpretive programs is available late June through Labor Day weekend, and the Champoeg Promise program provides an interactive living history program for schoolchildren.

The site is open year-round and is available for camping (tent, yurt, cabin and RV), hiking, disc golf, bicycling, bird watching, picnicking, fishing and boating.

=== Archeological sites ===
- Champoeg State Park Historic Archeological District
- U.S. National Register of Historic Places
- U.S. Historic district
- Location within Oregon Location within the United States
- Nearest city: St. Paul, Oregon
- Built: 1830
- NRHP reference No.: 84003038
- Added to NRHP: August 01, 1984

The Champoeg State Heritage Area is the site of the Champoeg State Park Historic Archeological District, which was listed on the National Register of Historic Places in 1984. One of the important archeological finds at the site is the only mostly intact early homesite found so far on French Prairie. The evidence suggests that this was Robert Newell's first homesite.

== See also ==
- François X. Matthieu
- List of ghost towns in Oregon
