= Andrew Jackson and Sarah Jane Masters House =

United States historic place

- U.S. National Register of Historic Places
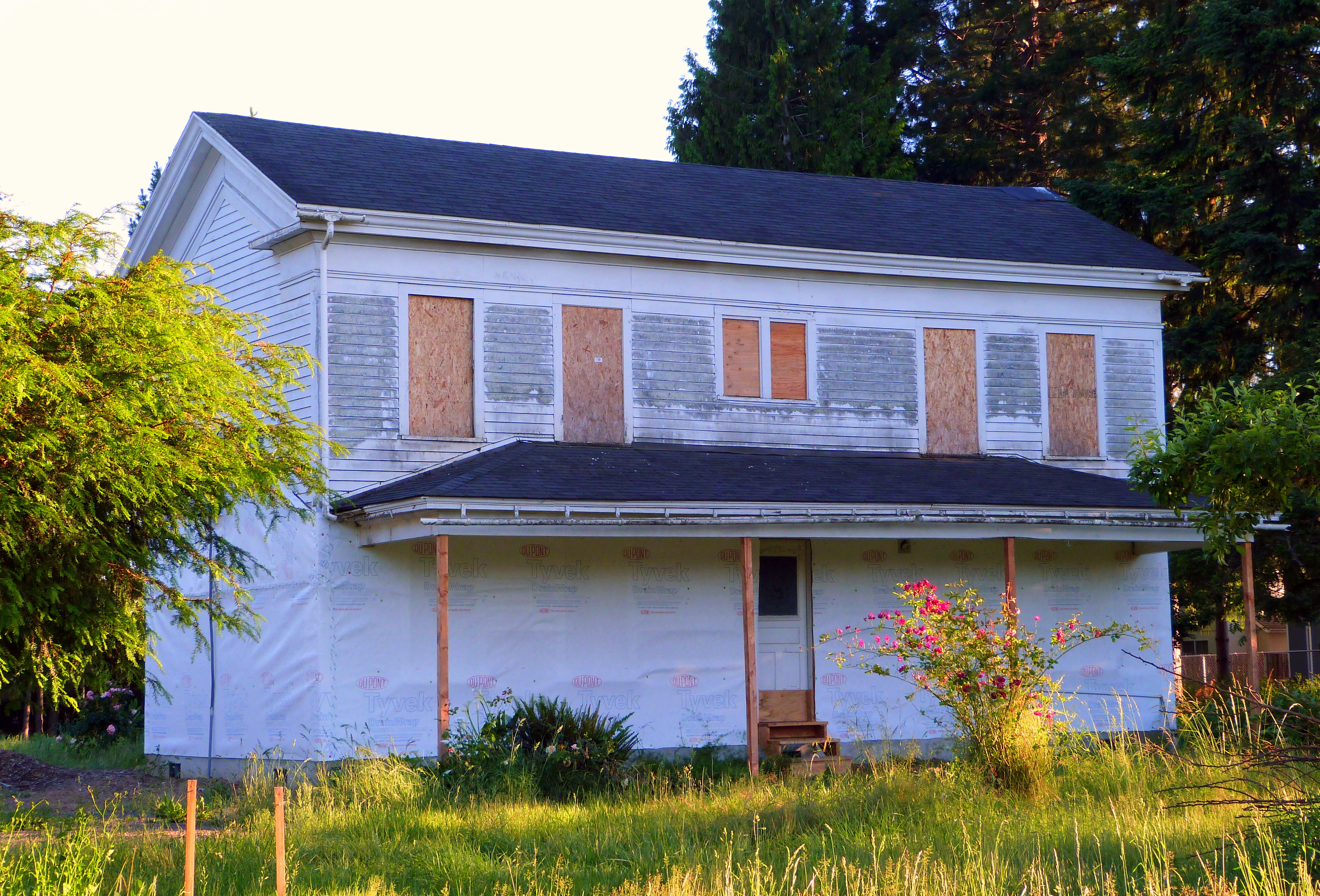
- Andrew Jackson and Sarah Jane Masters House under restoration (June 4, 2015)

- Location within Oregon Location within the United States
- Location: 20650 SW Kinnaman Road, Aloha, Oregon
- Coordinates: 45°29′20″N 122°53′23″W
- Built: 1854
- Architect: John Kuykendall
- Architectural style: Classical revival architecture
- NRHP reference No.: 15000615
- Added to NRHP: September 17, 2015

Andrew Jackson and Sarah Jane Masters House is single-family residence located in east of Hillsboro, Oregon and west of Aloha, Oregon. It is listed on the National Register of Historic Places in 2015.

== History ==
The house was commissioned between 1853 and 1854 by Sarah Jane Masters. The house is a classic example of neoclassical architecture. It is one of the two houses owned by the City of Hillsboro. The other one is 1912-built Malcolm McDonald House, also listed with NRHP.

== Gallery ==
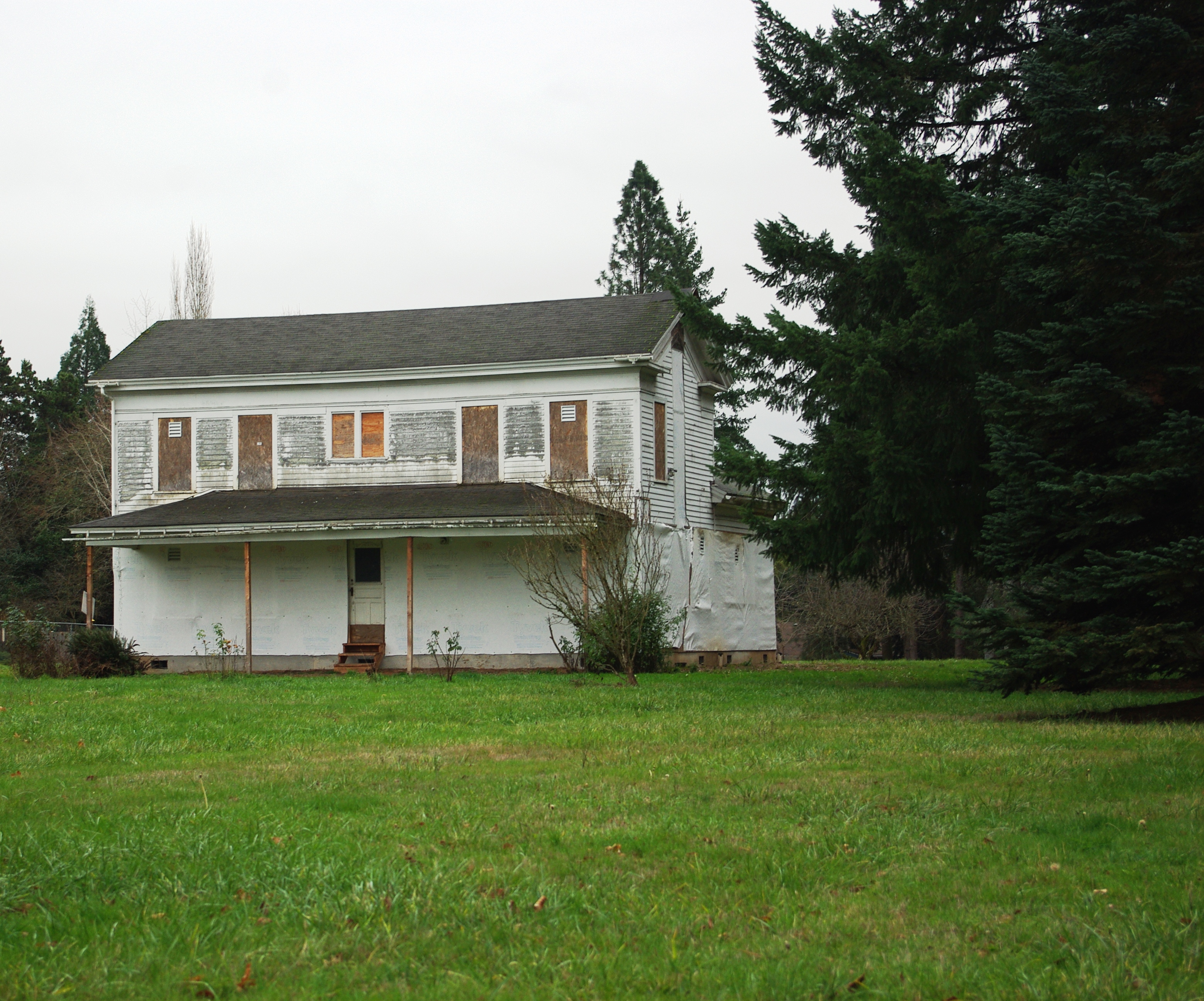
A view from north-west

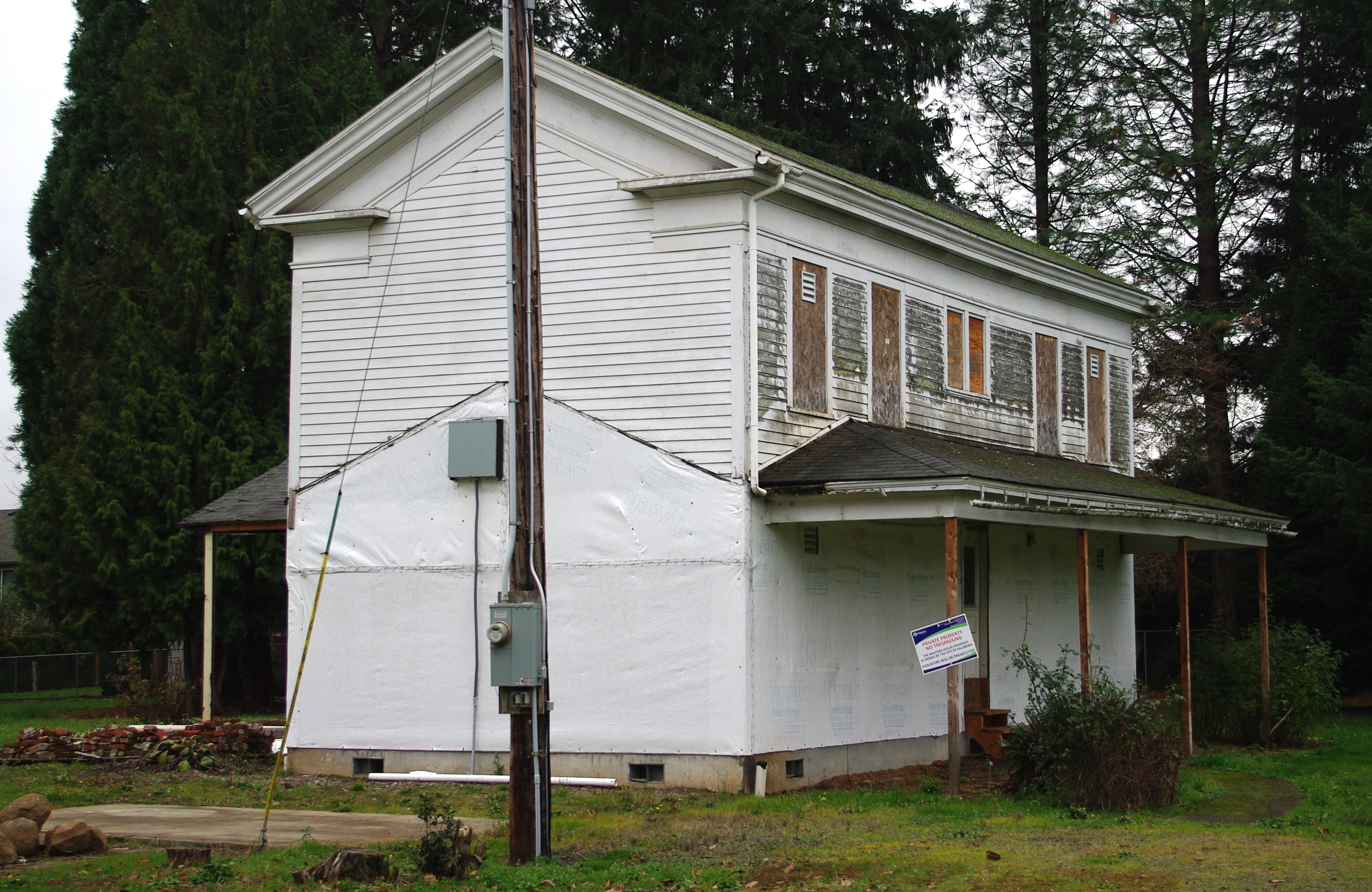
A view from eastside

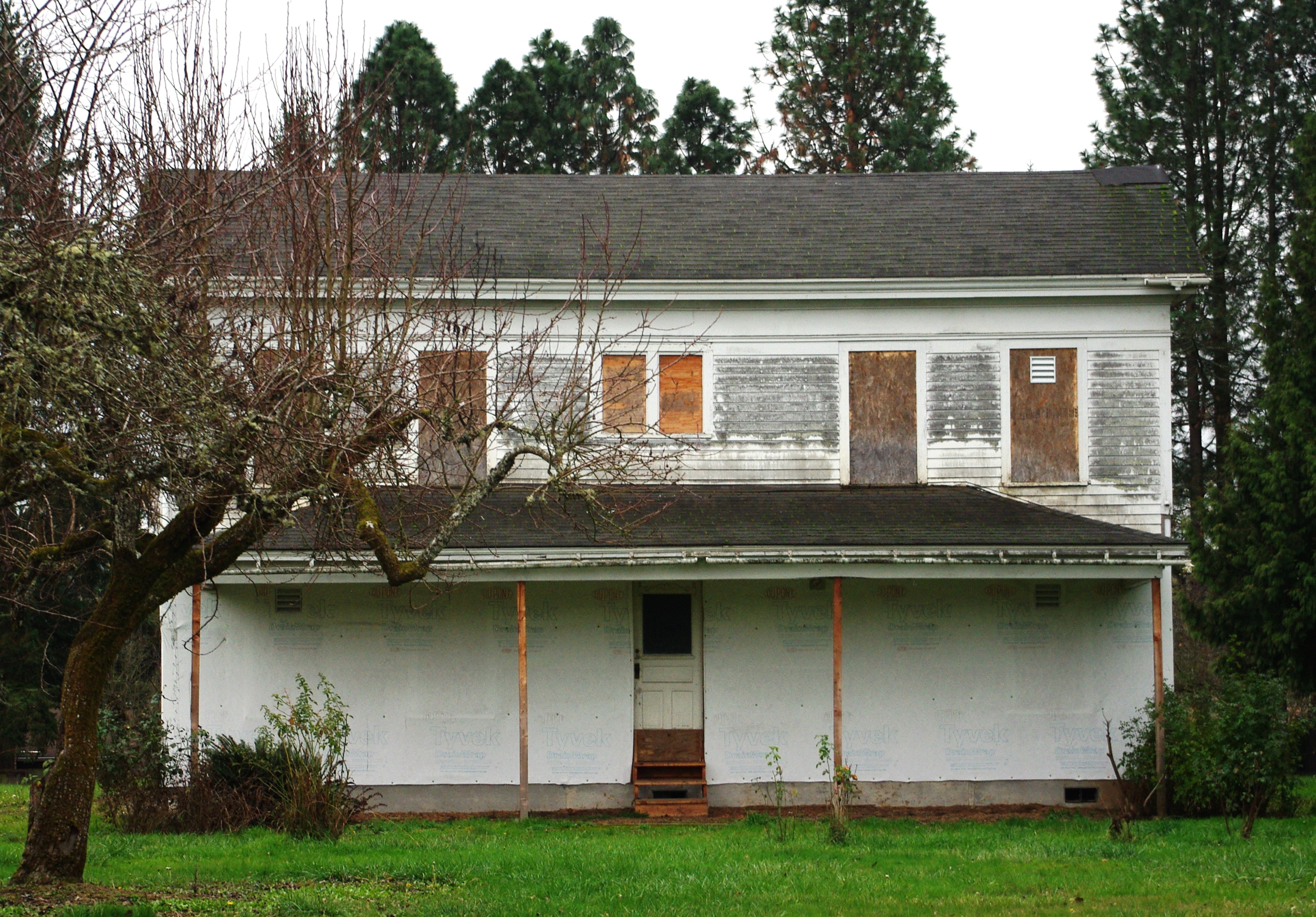
A front view of the house

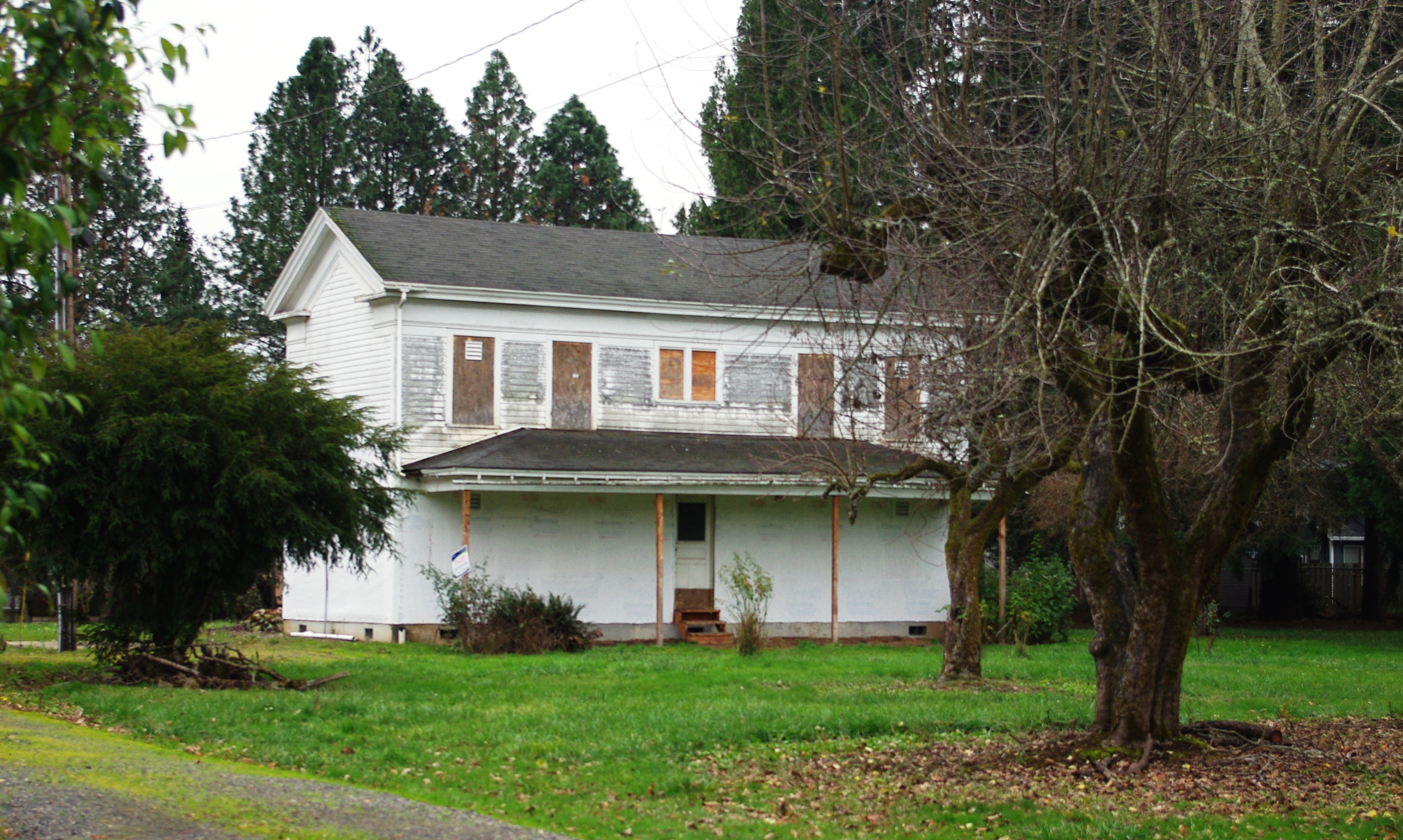
A angular view of the house

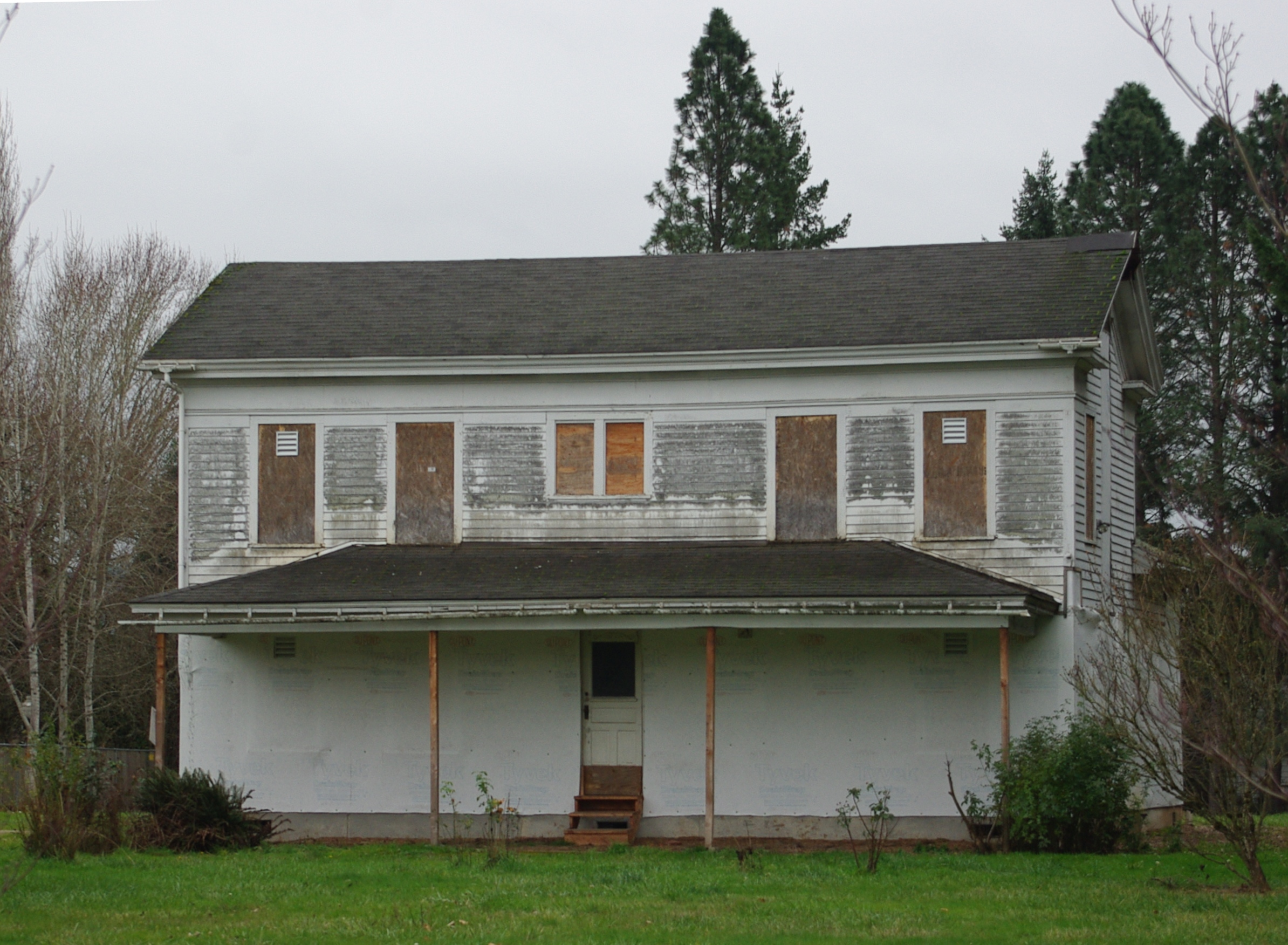
A framed view of the house

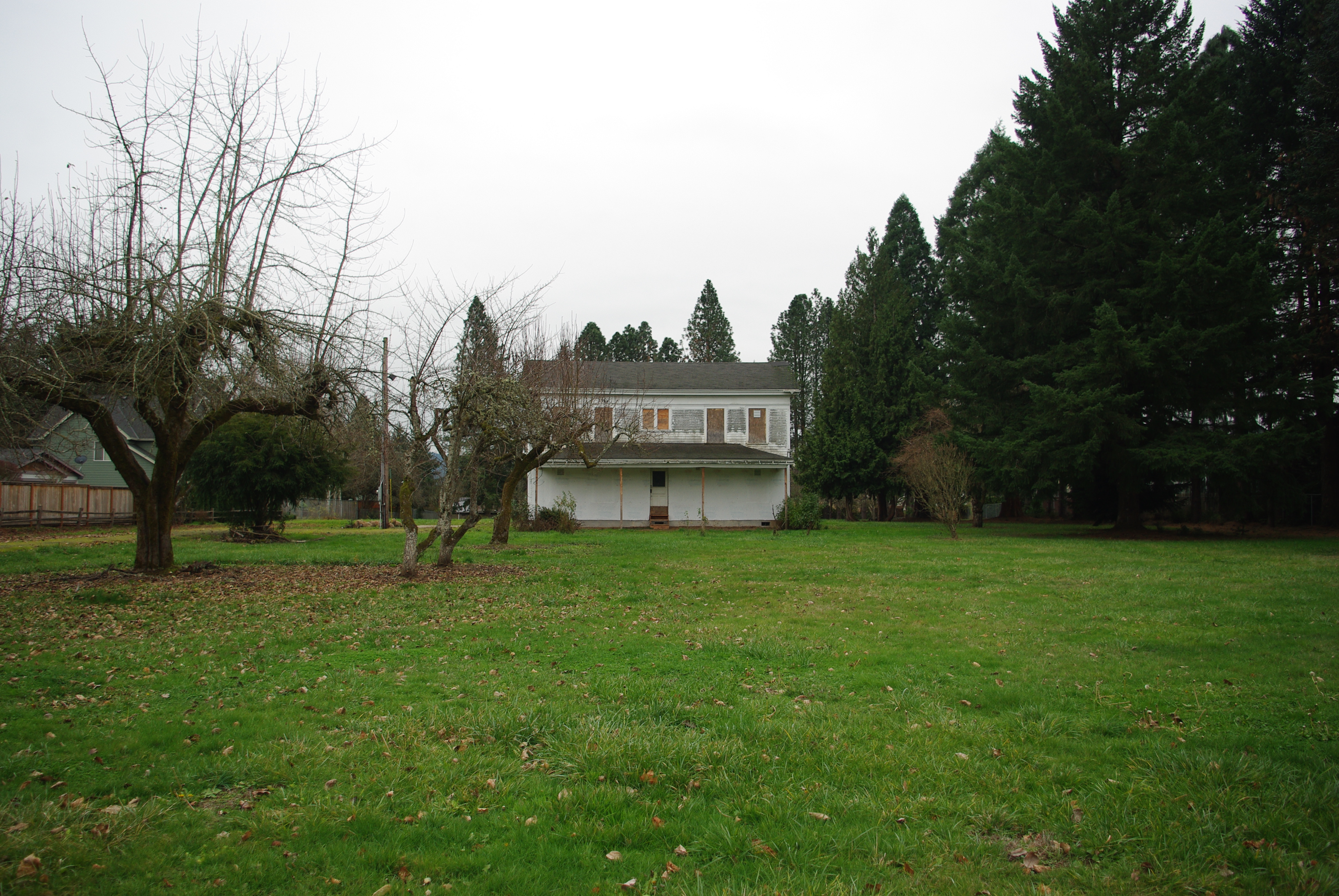
A front (wide) view of the house

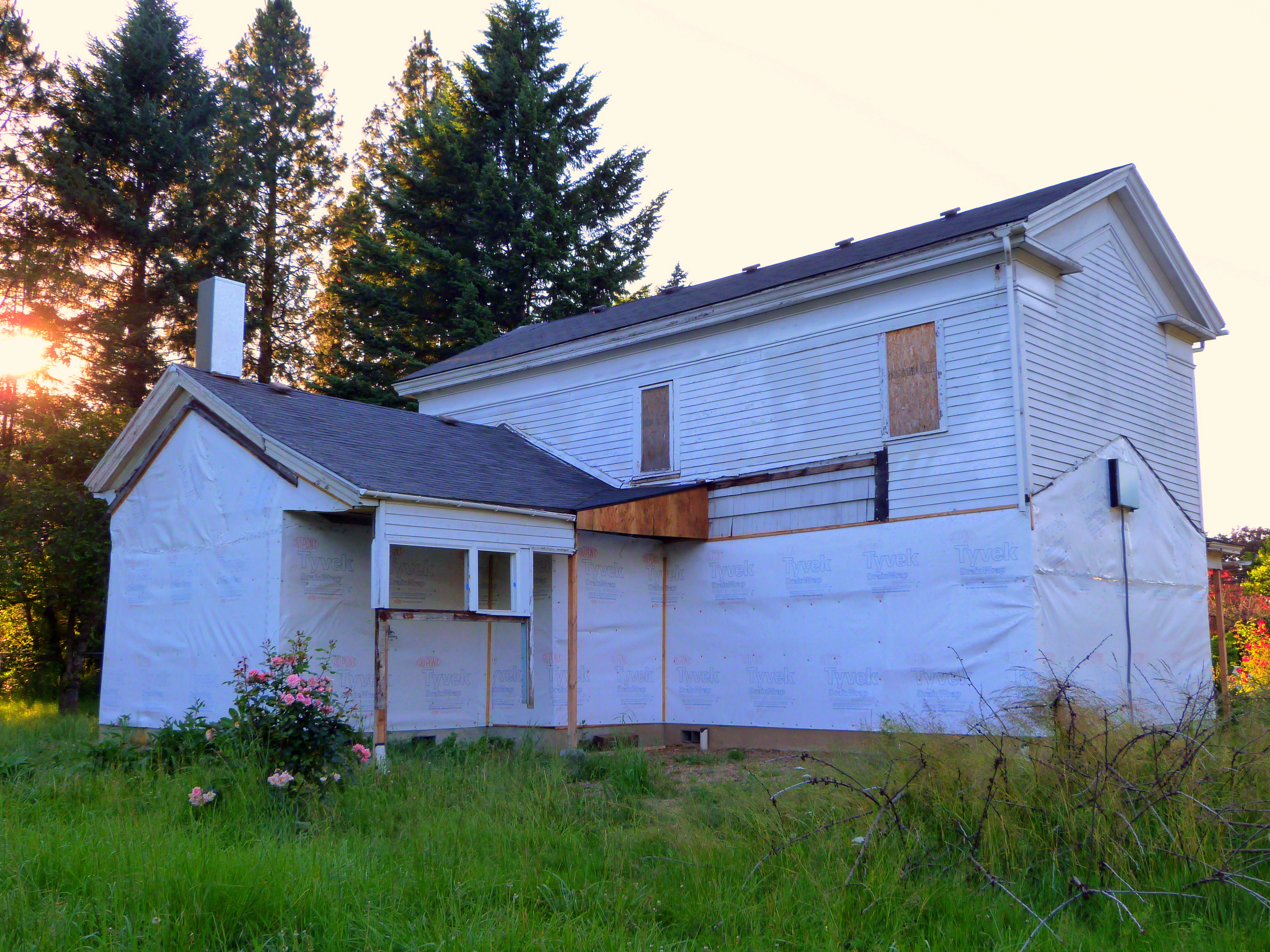
House under restoration in 2015
