= Daniel and Catherine Christian House =

Historic house in Oregon, United States

- U.S. National Register of Historic Places
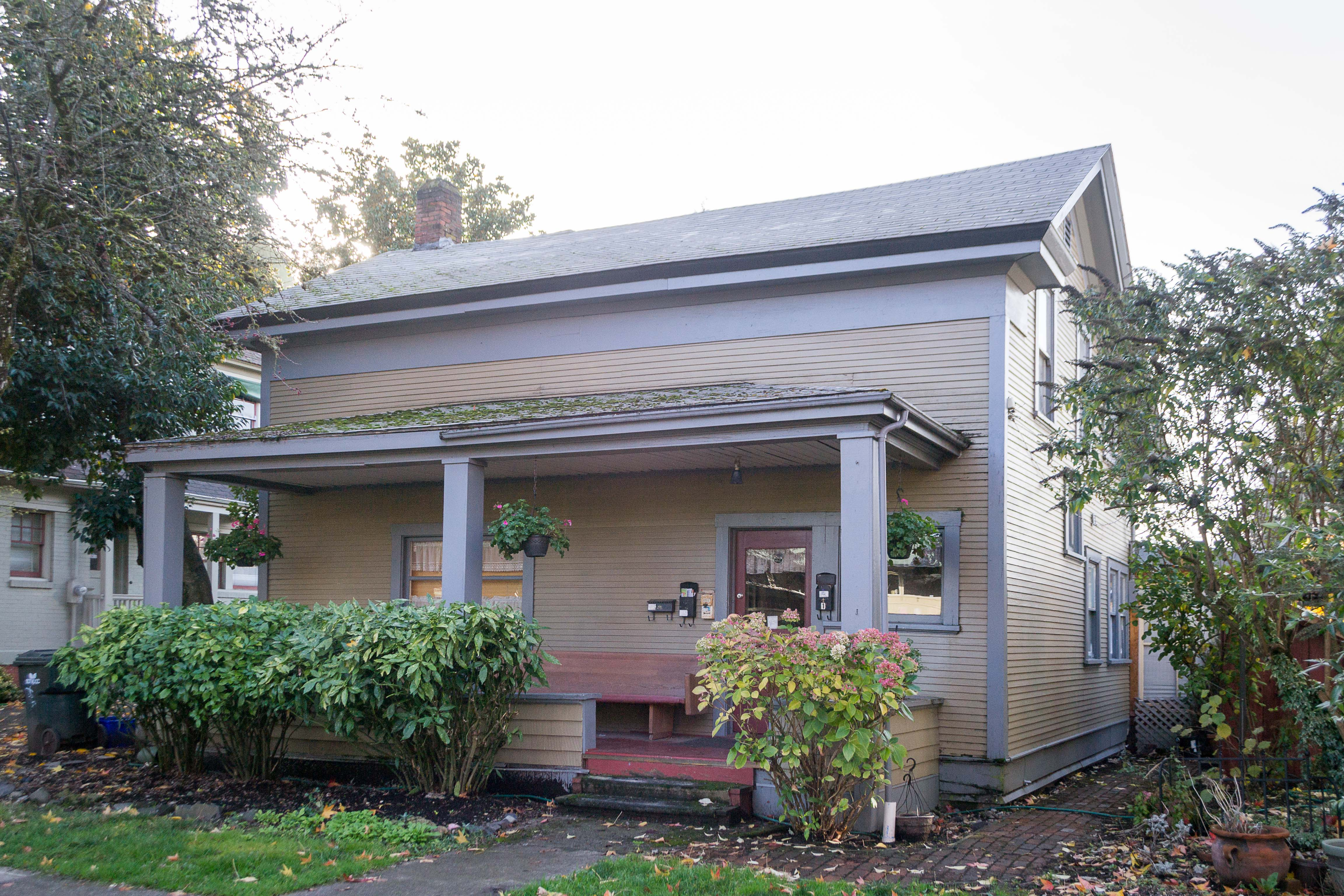
- The house in 2013

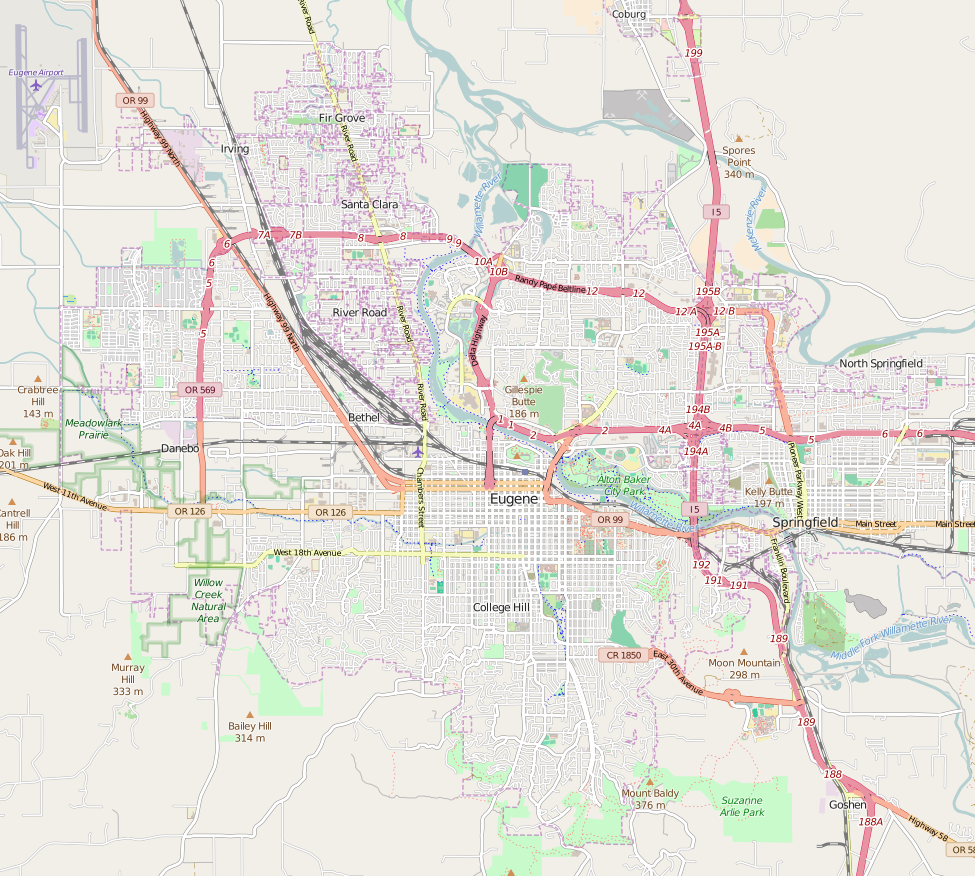
- Location within Eugene OR Location within Oregon
- Location: 170 E. 12th Ave., Eugene, Oregon
- Coordinates: 44°2′47″N 123°5′20″W
- Area: less than one acre
- Built: 1855
- Built by: Daniel Christian III
- Architectural style: Classical Revival
- MPS: Residential Architecture of Eugene, Oregon MPS
- NRHP reference No.: 07001507
- Added to NRHP: January 29, 2008

The Daniel and Catherine Christian House, located in Eugene, Oregon, is a house listed on the National Register of Historic Places. Constructed c. 1855, the house is the oldest residential structure in Eugene and one of six remaining classical revival houses in Lane County.

Daniel Christian was among the early settlers in the Eugene area. In 1853 he built a log cabin on his Donation Land Claim, and in 1855 he built the subject house at the edge of what became the Christian Addition on early maps of downtown Eugene.

== See also ==
- National Register of Historic Places listings in Lane County, Oregon
