= Spring Valley Presbyterian Church =

Historic church in Oregon, United States

- U.S. National Register of Historic Places
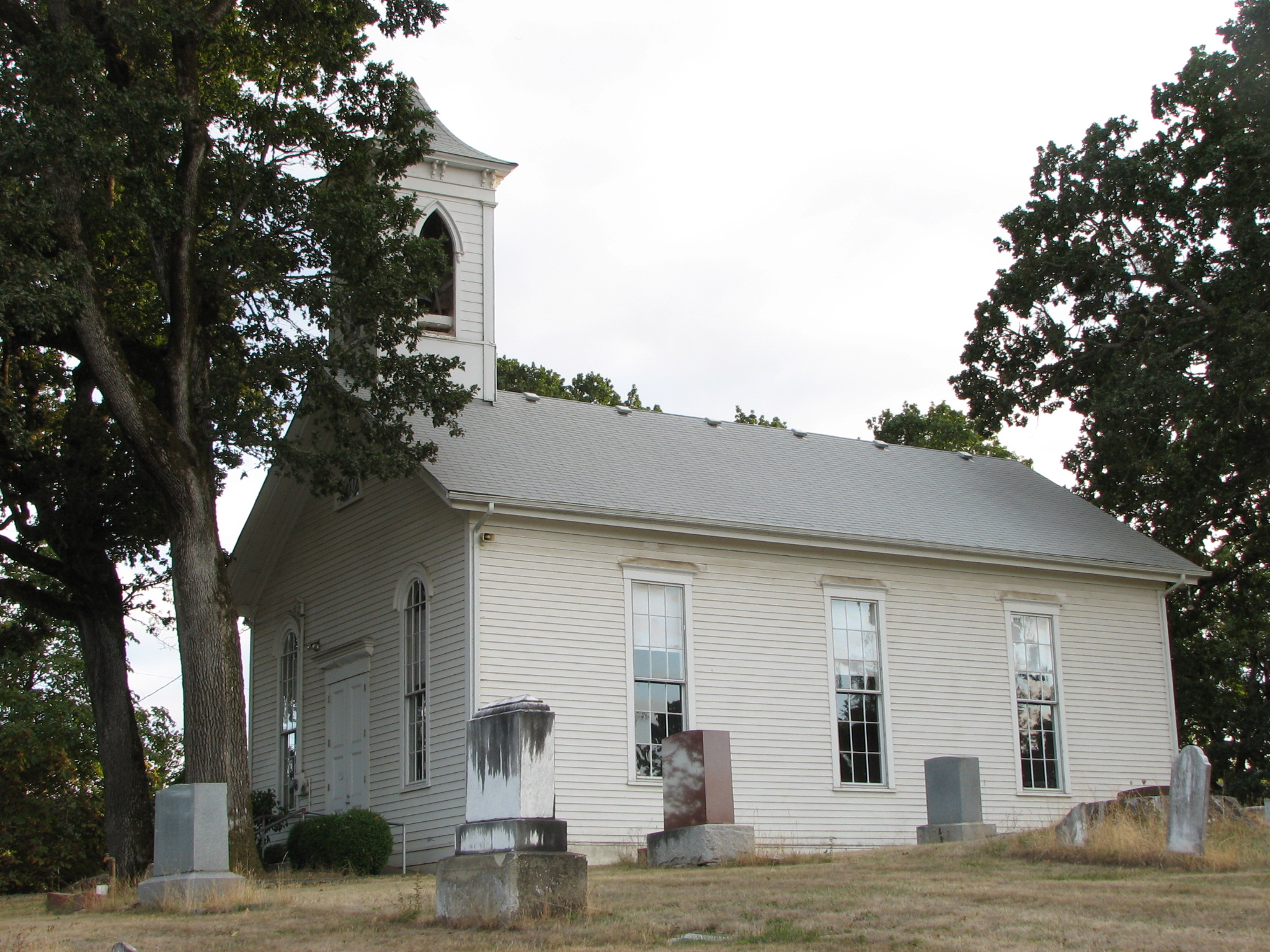
- Location: Zena, Oregon
- Coordinates: 45.0088°N 123.1283°W
- Built: 1859
- Architectural style: American Queen Anne style
- NRHP reference No.: 74001717
- Added to NRHP: 1974

The Spring Valley Presbyterian Church, also known as the Zena Church, in the community of Zena, is a Presbyterian congregation approximately 10 miles northwest of Salem, Oregon, United States.

According to a commemorative plaque in front of the church, it was built in 1859 with volunteer labor. The lumber came by boat on the Willamette River to the community of Lincoln, while the bell came from England via Cape Horn.

Directly adjacent to the church is a small cemetery of approximately 100 headstones. Sunday church services and private weddings are still held at Spring Valley. Local families continue to bury their dead in the cemetery.

The church was placed on the National Register of Historic Places in 1974.

== Images ==
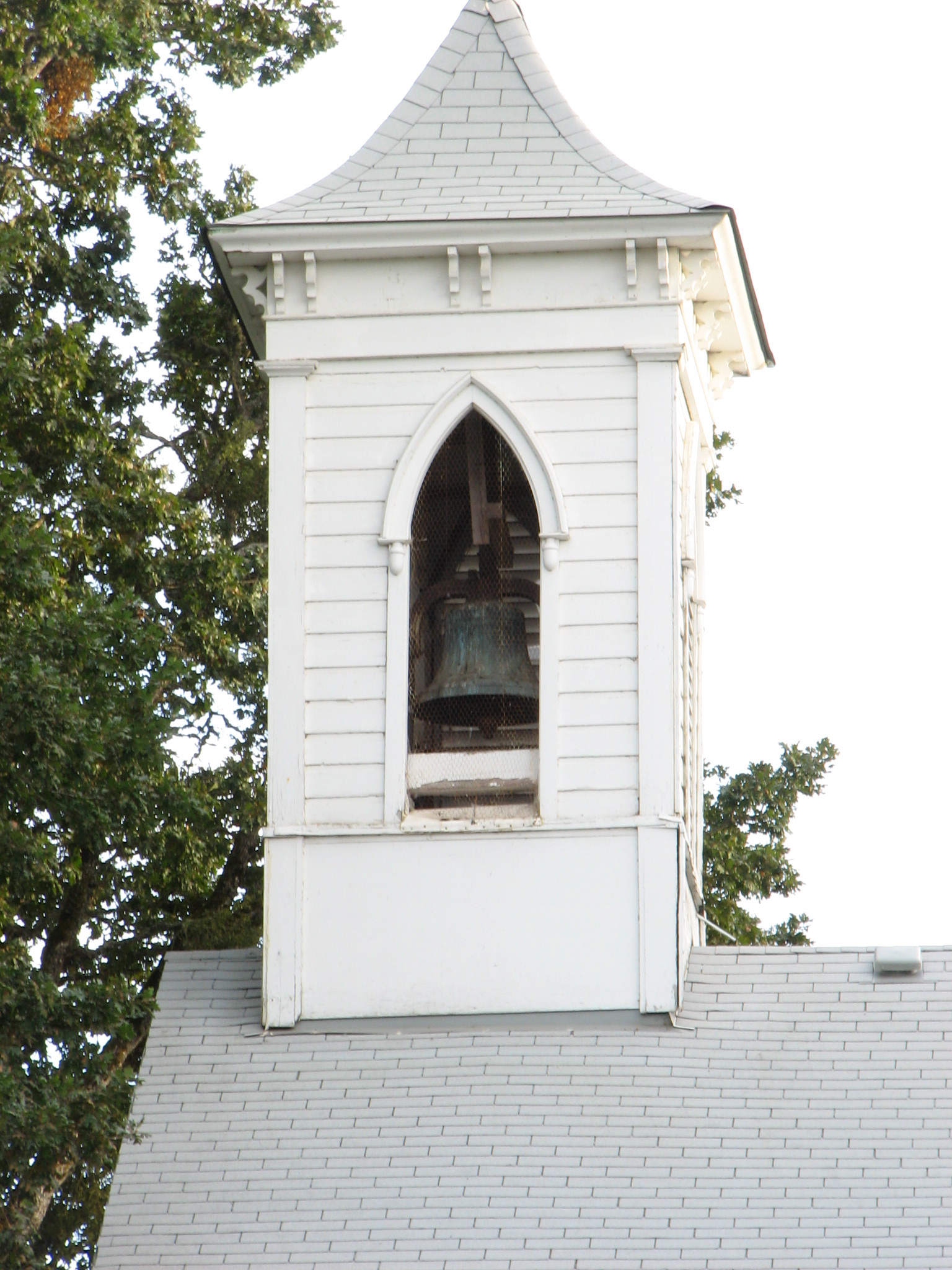
The church's bell and belfry.

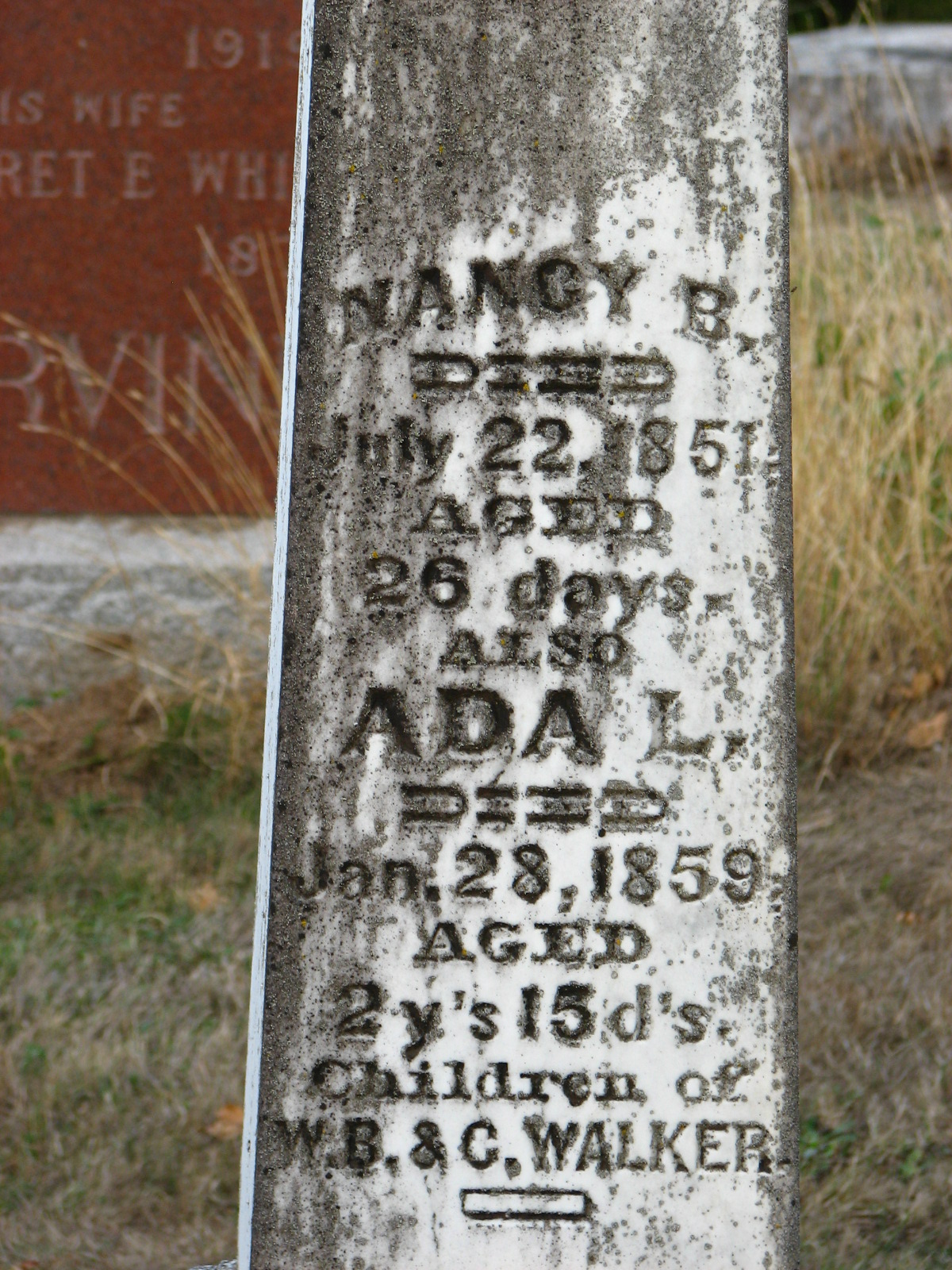
An early gravestone from the churchyard.
