= List of ship launches in 1942 =

The list of ship launches in 1942 includes a chronological list of some of the ships launched in 1942.

== January ==
Date	Ship	Class	Builder	Location	Country	Notes
5 January	Empire Fairy	Near-Warrior type tug	Cochrane & Son Ltd.	Selby	United Kingdom	For Ministry of War Transport.
5 January	Empire Roamer	Cargo ship	C. Connell & Co. Ltd.	Glasgow	United Kingdom	For Ministry of War Transport.
6 January	Empire Bede	Cargo ship	Harland & Wolff Ltd	Glasgow	United Kingdom	For Ministry of War Transport
6 January	Manaar	Cargo ship	William Hamilton & Co. Ltd.	Port Glasgow	United Kingdom	For T. & J. Brocklebank Ltd.
10 January	Robert Fulton	Liberty ship	Oregon Shipbuilding Corporation	Portland, Oregon	United States	For War Shipping Administration.
12 January	Bardell	Bar-class boom defence vessel	Blyth Dry Docks & Shipbuilding Co. Ltd	Blyth, Northumberland	United Kingdom	For Royal Navy.
13 January	Empire Spruce	Maple-type tug	Richard Dunston Ltd.	Thorne	United Kingdom	For Ministry of War Transport.
14 January	Daniel Boone	Liberty ship	California Shipbuilding Corporation	Los Angeles, California	United States	For War Shipping Administration.
14 January	Ocean Vulcan	Ocean ship	Permanente Metals Corporation	Richmond, California	United States	For War Shipping Administration.
15 January	Baltyk	Cargo ship	Swan, Hunter & Wigham Richardson Ltd.	Newcastle upon Tyne	United Kingdom	For Polish Government.
15 January	Bogue	Bogue-class escort carrier	Seattle-Tacoma Shipyard	Tacoma	United States	Converted C3 merchant freighter
15 January	Blean	Hunt-class destroyer	Hawthorn Leslie & Co.	Hebburn	United Kingdom	
15 January	Empire Dyke	Coaster	Clelands (Successors) Ltd.	Wallsend	United Kingdom	For Ministry of War Transport.
15 January	Empire Forest	Cargo ship	John Readhead & Sons Ltd.	South Shields	United Kingdom	For Ministry of War Transport.
15 January	Empire Jill	Coaster	S. P. Austin & Sons Ltd.	Sunderland	United Kingdom	For Ministry of War Transport.
15 January	Empire Knight	Cargo ship	William Doxford & Sons Ltd.	Pallion	United Kingdom	For Ministry of War Transport.
15 January	Oakley	Hunt-class destroyer	Yarrow & Co. Ltd	Scotstoun, Glasgow	United Kingdom	Sold in 1958 to West Germany as Gneisenau
15 January	Empire Dyke	Coaster	Clelands (Successors) Ltd	Wallsend	United Kingdom	For Ministry of War Transport
15 January	Empire Forest	Cargo ship	John Readhead & Sons Ltd	South Shields	United Kingdom	For Ministry of War Transport
15 January	Empire Jill	Coaster	S P Austin & Sons Ltd	Sunderland	United Kingdom	For Ministry of War Transport
16 January	Queenborough	Q-class destroyer	Swan Hunter	Wallsend	United Kingdom	To Royal Australian Navy as HMAS Queenborough 1945, later converted to Type 15 frigate, sold for scrapping 1975
17 January	Echuca	Bathurst-class corvette	HMA Naval Dockyard	Williamstown, Victoria	Australia	
17 January	Empire Barrie	Cargo ship	J. L. Thompson & Sons Ltd.	Sunderland	United Kingdom	For Ministry of War Transport
17 January	Empire Chapman	Ocean type tanker	Harland & Wolff Ltd	Belfast	United Kingdom	For Ministry of War Transport.
17 January	Empire Marvell	Norwegian type tanker	Sir J. Laing & Sons Ltd.	Sunderland	United Kingdom	For Ministry of War Transport.
17 January	Empire Purcell	Cargo ship	William Gray & Co. Ltd.	West Hartlepool	United Kingdom	For Ministry of War Transport.
17 January	John Adams	Liberty ship	Permanente Metals Corporation	Richmond, California	United States	For War Shipping Administration.
17 January	Nathaniel Greene	Liberty ship	North Carolina Shipbuilding Company	Wilmington, North Carolina	United States	For War Shipping Administration.
19 January	Empire Goblin	Near-Warrior type tug	Cochrane & Sons Ltd.	Selby	United Kingdom	For Ministry of War Transport.
29 January	Empire Lily	Coaster	Isaac Pimblott & Sons Ltd.	Northwich	United Kingdom	For Ministry of War Transport.
29 January	Empire Tennyson	Scandinavian type cargo ship	William Gray & Co. Ltd.	West Hartlepool	United Kingdom	For Ministry of War Transport.
20 January	Empire March	Cargo ship	Vickers-Armstrongs Ltd.	Barrow in Furness	United Kingdom	For Ministry of War Transport.
20 January	Empire Palm	Warrior type tug	Scott & Sons	Bowling	United Kingdom	For Ministry of War Transport.
20 January	Ocean Valour	Ocean ship	Permanente Metals Corporation	Richmond, California	United States	For War Shipping Administration.
20 January	San Victoria	Tanker	Blythswood Shipbuilding Co. Ltd.	Glasgow	United Kingdom	For Eagle Oil & Shipping Co. Ltd.
21 January	Stephen A. Douglas	Liberty ship	Oregon Shipbuilding Corporation	Portland, Oregon	United States	For War Shipping Administration.
24 January	Armidale	Bathurst-class corvette	Mort's Dock & Engineering Co	Sydney	Australia	
24 January	Benjamin Harrison	Liberty ship	Bethlehem Fairfield Shipyard	Baltimore, Maryland	United States	For War Shipping Administration.
24 January	Carter Braxton	Liberty ship	Bethlehem Fairfield Shipyard	Baltimore, Maryland	United States	For War Shipping Administration.
28 January	Robert Morris	Liberty ship	California Shipbuilding Corporation	Los Angeles, California	United States	For War Shipping Administration.
29 January	Bramham	Hunt-class destroyer	Alexander Stephens & Sons	Govan, Glasgow	United Kingdom	To the Royal Hellenic Navy in 1943 as Themistocles
30 January	Gympie	Bathurst-class corvette	Evans Deakin & Co	Brisbane	Australia	
30 January	Tahsinia	Cargo ship	William Doxford & Sons Ltd.	Pallion	United Kingdom	For Anchor Line Ltd.
31 January	Quiberon	Q-class destroyer	J. Samuel White	Cowes	Australia	
31 January	Empire Punch	Coaster	Richards Ironworks Ltd.	Lowestoft	United Kingdom	For Ministry of War Transport.
	Ocean Venus	Ocean ship	Permanente Metals Corporation	Richmond, California	United States	For War Shipping Administration.
31 January	Samuel Adams	Liberty ship	California Shipbuilding Corporation	Los Angeles, California	United States	For War Shipping Administration.

== February ==
Date	Ship	Class	Builder	Location	Country	Notes
2 February	Nicania	Tanker	R. & W. Hawthorn, Leslie and Co. Ltd.	Newcastle on Tyne	United Kingdom	For Anglo-Saxon Petroleum Co. Ltd.
3 February	Border	Hunt-class destroyer	Swan Hunter	Tyne and Wear	United Kingdom	Transferred to Greece in 1942 as Adrias
3 February	Virginia Dare	Liberty ship	North Carolina Shipbuilding Company	Wilmington, North Carolina	United States	For War Shipping Administration.
3 February	William Pearman	Collier	Burntisland Shipbuilding Company	Burntisland	United Kingdom	For London Power Co. Ltd.
4 February	John Jay	Liberty ship	Oregon Shipbuilding Corporation	Portland, Oregon	United States	For War Shipping Administration.
4 February	Nathan Hale	Liberty ship	California Shipbuilding Corporation	Los Angeles, California	United States	For War Shipping Administration.
5 February	Alarm	Algerine-class minesweeper	Harland & Wolff	Belfast	United Kingdom	For Royal Navy.
6 February	Kit Carson	Liberty ship	Permanente Metals Corporation	Richmond, California	United States	For War Shipping Administration.
7 February	Warramunga	Tribal-class destroyer	Cockatoo Docks & Engineering	Sydney	Australia	
7 February	William Dawes	Liberty ship	Oregon Shipbuilding Corporation	Portland, Oregon	United States	For War Shipping Administration.
10 February	VIC 4	VIC lighter	Richard Dunston Ltd.	Thorne	United Kingdom	For the War Department.
12 February	Albert Gallatin	Liberty ship	California Shipbuilding Corporation	Los Angeles, California	United States	For War Shipping Administration.
12 February	Montpelier	Cleveland-class light cruiser	New York Shipbuilding Corporation	Camden, New Jersey	United States	
13 February	Acharne	Programme 1924 tug	Ateliers et Chantiers de la Loire	Nantes	France	For French Navy
14 February	Empire Dickens	Norwegian type tanker	Furness Shipbuilding Co. Ltd.	Haverton Hill-on-Tees	United Kingdom	For Ministry of War Transport.
14 February	Ocean Vigour	Ocean ship	Permanente Metals Corporation	Richmond, California	United States	For War Shipping Administration.
15 February	Breton	Bogue-class escort carrier	Ingalls Shipbuilding	Pascagoula, Mississippi	United States	Converted C3 merchant freighter
15 February	Christopher Newport	Liberty ship	Bethlehem Fairfield Shipyard	Baltimore, Maryland	United States	For War Shipping Administration.
15 February	Philip Schuyler	Liberty ship	Oregon Shipbuilding Corporation	Portland, Oregon	United States	For War Shipping Administration.
16 February	Alabama	South Dakota-class battleship	Norfolk Navy Yard	Portsmouth, Virginia	United States	
16 February	Empire Hearth	Icemaid type collier	Grangemouth Dockyard Co. Ltd.	Grangemouth	United Kingdom	For Ministry of War Transport.
17 February	Empire Elgar	Heavy lift ship	William Gray & Co Ltd	West Hartlepool	United Kingdom	For Ministry of War Transport
17 February	Empire Fairbairn	Cargo ship	Barclay Curle & Co.	Glasgow	United Kingdom	For Ministry of War Transport
17 February	Empire Spartan	Cargo ship	Lithgows Ltd.	Port Glasgow	United Kingdom	For Ministry of War Transport.
17 February	Empire Spenser	Ocean type tanker	Harland & Wolff	Belfast	United Kingdom	For Ministry of War Transport.
17 February	Empire Sprite	Near-Warrior type tug	Henry Scarr Ltd	Hessle	United Kingdom	For Ministry of War Transport.
18 February	Empire Vigilance	Ocean type tanker	Harland & Wolff	Govan	United Kingdom	For Ministry of War Transport. Completed as British Vigilance.
18 February	Oliver Hazard Perry	Liberty ship	California Shipbuilding Corporation	Los Angeles, California	United States	For War Shipping Administration.
18 February	Wallaroo	Bathurst-class corvette	Poole & Steel	Balmain, New South Wales	Australia	
19 February	Empire Dweller	coastal tanker	G. Brown & Co. Ltd.	Greenock	United Kingdom	For Ministry of War Transport
19 February	George Clymer	Liberty ship	Oregon Shipbuilding Corporation	Portland, Oregon	United States	For War Shipping Administration.
19 February	Nicholas	Fletcher-class destroyer	Bath Iron Works		United States	For US Navy
19 February	Obdurate	O-class destroyer	William Denny & Brothers	Dumbarton	United Kingdom	
21 February	Opportune	O-class destroyer	John I. Thornycroft & Company	Woolston	United Kingdom	
21 February	VIC 19	VIC lighter	Isaac Pimblott & Sons Ltd.	Northwich	United Kingdom	For the Admiralty.
21 February	William Hooper	Liberty ship	North Carolina Shipbuilding Company	Wilmington, North Carolina	United States	For War Shipping Administration.
22 February	James Wilson	Liberty ship	Oregon Shipbuilding Corporation	Portland, Oregon	United States	For War Shipping Administration.
22 February	Samuel Chase	Liberty ship	Bethlehem Fairfield Shipyard	Baltimore, Maryland	United States	For War Shipping Administration.
23 February	Empire Audrey	coastal tanker	G Brown & Co Ltd	Greenock	United Kingdom	For Ministry of War Transport
23 February	Empire Beatrice	Cargo ship	Lithgows Ltd	Port Glasgow	United Kingdom	For Ministry of War Transport
24 February	Zebulon Pike	Liberty ship	California Shipbuilding Corporation	Los Angeles, California	United States	For War Shipping Administration.
25 February	John Hart	Liberty ship	Oregon Shipbuilding Corporation	Portland, Oregon	United States	For War Shipping Administration.
27 February	Card	Bogue-class escort carrier	Seattle-Tacoma Shipyard	Tacoma	United States	Converted C3 merchant freighter
28 February	Elbridge Gerry	Liberty ship	California Shipbuilding Corporation	Los Angeles, California	United States	For War Shipping Administration.
28 February	Quadrant	Q-class destroyer	Hawthorn Leslie	Hebburn	United Kingdom	To Australia as HMAS Quadrant 1945, later converted to Type 15 frigate, sold for scrapping 1962
28 February	Ocean Vanity	Ocean ship	Permanente Metals Corporation	Richmond, California	United States	For War Shipping Administration.
28 February	Richard Bland	Liberty ship	Bethlehem Fairfield Shipyard	Baltimore, Maryland	United States	For War Shipping Administration.
28 February	Zachary Taylor	Liberty ship	Permanente Metals Corporation	Richmond, California	United States	For War Shipping Administration.

== March ==
Date	Ship	Class	Builder	Location	Country	Notes
1 March	Richthofen	Hans Albrecht Wedel-class light seaplane tender	Schichau	Königsberg	Germany	For the Luftwaffe
2 March	Congonian	Tanker	Swan, Hunter & Wigham Richardson Ltd.	Newcastle upon Tyne	United Kingdom	For United Africa Co. Ltd.
2 March	Myrmidon	M-class destroyer	Fairfield	Govan, Glasgow	United Kingdom	Loaned to the Polish Navy and renamed ORP Orkan
4 March	John Witherspoon	Liberty ship	Bethlehem Fairfield Shipyard	Baltimore, Maryland	United States	For War Shipping Administration.
4 March	Stronsay	Isles-class trawler	Harland & Wolff	Belfast	United Kingdom	For Royal Navy.
4 March	Tamworth	Bathurst-class corvette	Walkers Limited	Maryborough	Australia	
5 March	British Tradition	Tanker	Cammell Laird & Co. Ltd.	Birkenhead	United Kingdom	For British Tanker Co. Ltd.
5 March	Empire Arthur	Coastal tanker	Grangemouth Dockyard Co. Ltd.	Grangemouth	United Kingdom	For Ministry of War Transport.
5 March	Empire Cadet	Coastal tanker	William Gray & Co Ltd	West Hartlepool	United Kingdom	For Ministry of War Transport
5 March	Hamlin	Bogue-class escort carrier	Western Pipe & Steel		United States	Converted C3 merchant freighter
5 March	Henry W. Longfellow	Liberty ship	Oregon Shipbuilding Corporation	Portland, Oregon	United States	For War Shipping Administration.
5 March	Melbreak	Hunt-class destroyer	J. Samuel White	Cowes	United Kingdom	
5 March	Ocean Vintage	Ocean ship	Permanente Metals Corporation	Richmond, California	United States	For War Shipping Administration.
6 March	Empire Arnold	Cargo ship	William Gray & Co Ltd	West Hartlepool	United Kingdom	For Ministry of War Transport
6 March	Henry Knox	Liberty ship	California Shipbuilding Corporation	Los Angeles, California	United States	For War Shipping Administration.
7 March	Zetland	Hunt-class destroyer	Yarrow Shipbuilders	Scotstoun, Glasgow	United Kingdom	
7 March	Tracker	Attacker-class escort carrier	Seattle-Tacoma Shipyard	Tacoma	United States	Converted C3 merchant freighter
8 March	Daniel Morgan	Liberty ship	North Carolina Shipbuilding Company	Wilmington, North Carolina	United States	For War Shipping Administration.
11 March	John Dickinson	Liberty ship	Oregon Shipbuilding Corporation	Portland, Oregon	United States	For War Shipping Administration.
11 March	Rufus King	Liberty ship	California Shipbuilding Corporation	Los Angeles, California	United States	For War Shipping Administration.
14 March	Francis L. Lee	Liberty ship	Bethlehem Fairfield Shipyard	Baltimore, Maryland	United States	For War Shipping Administration.
14 March	George Calvert	Liberty ship	Bethlehem Fairfield Shipyard	Baltimore, Maryland	United States	For War Shipping Administration.
15 March	Anthony Wayne	Liberty ship	Permanente Metals Corporation	Richmond, California	United States	For War Shipping Administration.
15 March	Ocean Volunteer	Ocean ship	Permanente Metals Corporation	Richmond, California	United States	For War Shipping Administration.
16 March	Empire Cherub	Near-Warrior type tug	Hall, Russell & Co Ltd	Aberdeen	United Kingdom	For Ministry of War Transport.
16 March	Fireside	C-type coaster	S. P. Austin & Sons Ltd.	Sunderland	United Kingdom	For Gas, Light & Coke Co. Ltd.
17 March	Deseado	Refrigerated cargo ship	Harland & Wolff	Belfast	United Kingdom	For Royal Mail Line.
17 March	Empire Coleridge	Norwegian type tanker	Sir J. Laing & Sons Ltd.	Sunderland	United Kingdom	For Ministry of War Transport.
17 March	Fisher Ames	Liberty ship	Oregon Shipbuilding Corporation	Portland, Oregon	United States	For War Shipping Administration.
17 March	Penylan	Hunt-class destroyer	Vickers-Armstrongs	Barrow in Furness	United Kingdom	
18 March	Empire Chaucer	Cargo ship	William Pickersgill & Sons Ltd	Sunderland	United Kingdom	For Ministry of War Transport
18 March	Empire Folk	Maple-type tug	Richard Dunston Ltd.	Thorne	United Kingdom	For Ministry of War Transport.
18 March	Fresno City	Cargo ship	William Doxford & Sons Ltd.	Pallion	United Kingdom	For Reardon Smith Line Ltd.
18 March	VIC 6	VIC lighter	Goole Shipbuilding & Repairing Co. Ltd.	Goole	United Kingdom	For the War Department.
19 March	Agra	Basset-class minesweeping trawler	Hooghly Engineering and Docking Co.	Calcutta	India	
19 March	Empire Keats	Cargo ship	Short Brothers Ltd.	Sunderland	United Kingdom	For Ministry of War Transport.
19 March	Hermann Kohl	Hans Albrecht Wedel-class light seaplane tender	Schichau	Königsberg	Germany	For the Luftwaffe
20 March	Birmingham	Cleveland-class light cruiser	Newport News Shipbuilding & Dry Dock Company	Newport News, Virginia	United States	
21 March	Rotherham	R-class destroyer	John Brown & Company	Clydebank	United Kingdom	To Indian Navy as Rajput 1949; scrapped 1976
22 March	Abiel Foster	Liberty ship	California Shipbuilding Corporation	Los Angeles, California	United States	For War Shipping Administration.
22 March	Francis Marion	Liberty ship	North Carolina Shipbuilding Company	Wilmington, North Carolina	United States	For War Shipping Administration.
22 March	Robert G. Harper	Liberty ship	Oregon Shipbuilding Corporation	Portland, Oregon	United States	For War Shipping Administration.
23 March	Empire Conrad	Cargo ship	Lithgows	Port Glasgow	United Kingdom	For Ministry of War Transport
24 March	Empire Austen	Cargo ship	Lithgows	Port Glasgow	United Kingdom	For Ministry of War Transport
24 March	Empire Wold	Near-Warrior type tug	John Crown & Sons Ltd.	Sunderland	United Kingdom	For Ministry of War Transport.
26 March	Edgar Allan Poe	Liberty ship	Oregon Shipbuilding Corporation	Portland, Oregon	United States	For War Shipping Administration.
28 March	Ocean Veteran	Ocean ship	Permanente Metals Corporation	Richmond, California	United States	For War Shipping Administration.
28 March	Robert Treat Paine	Liberty ship	Bethlehem Fairfield Shipyard	Baltimore, Maryland	United States	For War Shipping Administration.
28 March	Timothy Pickering	Liberty ship	Permanente Metals Corporation	Richmond, California	United States	For War Shipping Administration.
28 March	William C. C. Claiborne	Liberty ship	Delta Shipbuilding	New Orleans, Louisiana	United States	For War Shipping Administration.
29 March	Joseph Hewes	Liberty ship	North Carolina Shipbuilding Company	Wilmington, North Carolina	United States	For War Shipping Administration.
29 March	Sam Houston	Liberty ship	Todd Houston Shipbuilding Corporation	Houston, Texas	United States	For War Shipping Administration.
31 March	Benjamin Goodhue	Liberty ship	California Shipbuilding Corporation	Los Angeles, California	United States	For War Shipping Administration.
31 March	Empire Beaumont	Cargo ship	Furness Shipbuilding Co Ltd	Haverton Hill-on-Tees	United Kingdom	For Ministry of War Transport.
31 March	Empire Caxton	Scandinavian type cargo ship	William Gray & Co. Ltd.	West Hartlepool	United Kingdom	For Ministry of War Transport.
31 March	Empire Prince	Cargo ship	Caledon Shipbuilding & Engineering Co. Ltd.	Dundee	United Kingdom	For Ministry of War Transport.
31 March	Nathaniel Hawthorne	Liberty ship	Oregon Shipbuilding Corporation	Portland, Oregon	United States	For War Shipping Administration.
31 March	Vancouver City	Cargo ship	William Doxford & Sons Ltd.	Pallion	United Kingdom	For Reardon Smith Line Ltd.

== April ==
Date	Ship	Class	Builder	Location	Country	Notes
1 April	Empire Lawn	Near-Warrior type tug	Ferguson Bros. Ltd.	Port Glasgow	United Kingdom	For Ministry of War Transport.
1 April	Raider	R-class destroyer	Cammell Laird	Birkenhead	United Kingdom	To India as Rana 1949
1 April	Samsonia	Bustler-class tug	Henry Robb Ltd.	Leith	United Kingdom	For the Admiralty.
2 April	Abraham Clark	Liberty ship	California Shipbuilding Corporation	Los Angeles, California	United States	For War Shipping Administration.
2 April	Albacore	Algerine-class minesweeper	Harland & Wolff	Belfast	United Kingdom	For Royal Navy.
2 April	Empire Clough	Cargo ship	John Readhead & Sons Ltd	South Shields	United Kingdom	For Ministry of War Transport
2 April	Haydon	Hunt-class destroyer	Vickers-Armstrongs	Newcastle upon Tyne	United Kingdom	
2 April	Ingleton	Cargo ship	Burntisland Shipbuilding Company	Burntisland	United Kingdom	For R. Chapman & Son.
2 April	Lady Kathleen	Concrete ship	W. & C. French Ltd.	Newport	United Kingdom	For Concrete Maritime Ltd.
2 April	Orwell	O-class destroyer	John I. Thornycroft & Company	Woolston	United Kingdom	
2 April	VIC 7	VIC lighter	Richard Dunston Ltd.	Thorne	United Kingdom	For the Admiralty.
3 April	Switha	Isles-class trawler	Harland & Wolff	Belfast	United Kingdom	For Royal Navy.
4 April	Battler	Attacker-class escort carrier	Ingalls Shipbuilding	Pascagoula, Mississippi	United States	For Royal Navy. Converted C3 merchant freighter
4 April	Brave	Algerine-class minesweeper	Blyth Dry Docks & Shipbuilding Co. Ltd	Blyth, Northumberland	United Kingdom	For Royal Navy.
4 April	Croatan	Bogue-class escort carrier	Seattle-Tacoma Shipyard	Tacoma	United States	Converted C3 merchant freighter
4 April	Denver	Cleveland-class light cruiser	New York Shipbuilding Corporation	Camden, New Jersey	United States	
4 April	Empire Bowman	Cargo ship	C Connell & Co Ltd	Scotstoun, Glasgow	United Kingdom	For Ministry of War Transport
4 April	Empire Fletcher	Ocean type tanker	Harland & Wolff Ltd	Belfast	United Kingdom	For Ministry of War Transport.
4 April	Nassau	Bogue-class escort carrier	Seattle-Tacoma Shipyard	Tacoma	United States	Converted C3 merchant freighter
4 April	Searcher	Attacker-class escort carrier	Seattle-Tacoma Shipyard	Tacoma	United States	Converted C3 merchant freighter for Lend-Lease
4 April	Thomas Nelson	Liberty ship	Bethlehem Fairfield Shipyard	Baltimore, Maryland	United States	For War Shipping Administration.
5 April	Fancy	Algerine-class minesweeper	Blyth Dry Docks & Shipbuilding Co. Ltd	Blyth, Northumberland	United Kingdom	For Royal Navy.
5 April	John G. Whittier	Liberty ship	Oregon Shipbuilding Corporation	Portland, Oregon	United States	For War Shipping Administration.
6 April	Empire Mead	Near-Warrior type tug	Ferguson Bros Ltd.	Port Glasgow	United Kingdom	For Ministry of War Transport.
6 April	Empire Tristram	Cargo ship	J. L. Thompson & Sons Ltd.	Sunderland	United Kingdom	For Ministry of War Transport.
6 April	Ocean Voyager	Ocean ship	Permanente Metals Corporation	Richmond, California	United States	For War Shipping Administration.
7 April	William Cullen Bryant	Liberty ship	Oregon Shipbuilding Corporation	Portland, Oregon	United States	For War Shipping Administration.
8 April	William Floyd	Liberty ship	California Shipbuilding Corporation	Los Angeles, California	United States	For War Shipping Administration.
9 April	Mjölner	Mode-class destroyer	Eriksbergs Mekaniska Verkstad	Gothenburg	Sweden	For Swedish Navy
11 April	Mode	Mode-class destroyer	Götaverken	Gothenburg	Sweden	For Swedish Navy
11 April	Ocean Vista	Ocean ship	Permanente Metals Corporation	Richmond, California	United States	For War Shipping Administration.
11 April	Quickmatch	Q-class destroyer	J. Samuel White	Cowes	Australia	
12 April	Hawaiian Shipper	Modified Type C3 cargo liner	Federal Shipbuilding and Drydock Company	Kearny, New Jersey	United States	For United States War Shipping Administration
12 April	James Russell Lowell	Liberty ship	Oregon Shipbuilding Corporation	Portland, Oregon	United States	For War Shipping Administration.
12 April	John Penn	Liberty ship	North Carolina Shipbuilding Company	Wilmington, North Carolina	United States	For War Shipping Administration.
12 April	St. Olaf	Liberty ship	Bethlehem Fairfield Shipyard	Baltimore, Maryland	United States	For War Shipping Administration.
12 April	Thomas Stone	Liberty ship	Bethlehem Fairfield Shipyard	Baltimore, Maryland	United States	For War Shipping Administration.
13 April	Modbury	Hunt-class destroyer	Swan Hunter	Wallsend	United Kingdom	Transferred to Greece as Miaoulis
14 April	Acute	Algerine-class minesweeper	Harland & Wolff	Belfast	United Kingdom	For Royal Navy.
14 April	Bardolf	Bar-class boom defence vessel	Blyth Dry Docks & Shipbuilding Co. Ltd	Blyth, Northumberland	United Kingdom	For Royal Navy.
14 April	Holcombe	Hunt-class destroyer	Alexander Stephens & Sons	Glasgow	United Kingdom	
14 April	John Langdon	Liberty ship	California Shipbuilding Corporation	Los Angeles, California	United States	For War Shipping Administration.
14 April	Stephen Hopking	Liberty ship	Permanente Metals Corporation	Richmond, California	United States	For War Shipping Administration.
15 April	Empire Toiler	Scandinavian type cargo ship	Ailsa Shipbuilding & Co. Ltd.	Troon	United Kingdom	For Ministry of War Transport.
16 April	British Merit	Tanker	Harland & Wolff Ltd.	Govan	United Kingdom	For British Tanker Co. Ltd.
16 April	Caleb Strong	Liberty ship	California Shipbuilding Corporation	Los Angeles, California	United States	For War Shipping Administration.
16 April	Empire Gawain	Coastal tanker	Grangemouth Dockyard Co Ltd	Grangemouth	United Kingdom	For Ministry of War Transport
16 April	Empire Minotaur	Near-Warrior type tug	A. Hall & Co. Ltd.	Aberdeen	United Kingdom	For Ministry of War Transport.
16 April	Flamma	Collier	Burntisland Shipbuilding Company	Burntisland	United Kingdom	For Gas, Light & Coke Co. Ltd.
16 April	Henry D. Thoreau	Liberty ship	Oregon Shipbuilding Corporation	Portland, Oregon	United States	For War Shipping Administration.
16 April	Jersey City	Cargo ship	Bartram & Sons Ltd	Sunderland	United Kingdom	For Reardon Smith Line Ltd.
16 April	VIC 20	VIC lighter	Isaac Pimblott & Sons Ltd.	Northwich	United Kingdom	For Ministry of War Transport.
17 April	Empire Might	Cargo liner	Greenock Dockyard Co. Ltd.	Greenock	United Kingdom	For Ministry of War Transport.
18 April	Blackfish	Gato-class submarine	Electric Boat Company	Groton, Connecticut	United States	
18 April	Imta Layteri	Submarine tender	James Pollock & Sons	Faversham	United Kingdom	For Turkish Navy.
19 April	Davy Crockett	Liberty ship	Todd Houston Shipbuilding Corporation	Houston, Texas	United States	For War Shipping Administration.
19 April	Ralph Waldo Emerson	Liberty ship	Oregon Shipbuilding Corporation	Portland, Oregon	United States	For War Shipping Administration.
19 April	Ulster Duke	Coaster	Ardrossan Dockyard Ltd.	Ardrossan	United Kingdom	For Belfast Steamship Co. Ltd.
20 April	Empire Norseman	Norwegian type tanker	Furness Shipbuilding Co. Ltd.	Haverton Hill-on-Tees	United Kingdom	For Ministry of War Transport.
21 April	Ocean Volga	Ocean ship	Permanente Metals Corporation	Richmond, California	United States	For War Shipping Administration.
21 April	Paine Wingate	Liberty ship	California Shipbuilding Corporation	Los Angeles, California	United States	For War Shipping Administration.
23 April	James Whitcomb Riley	Liberty ship	Oregon Shipbuilding Corporation	Portland, Oregon	United States	For War Shipping Administration.
23 April	Peter Minuit	Liberty ship	Bethlehem Fairfield Shipyard	Baltimore, Maryland	United States	For War Shipping Administration.
23 April	T. J. Jackson	Liberty ship	Delta Shipbuilding	New Orleans, Louisiana	United States	For War Shipping Administration.
25 April	Magne	Mode-class destroyer	Götaverken	Gothenburg	Sweden	For Swedish Navy
25 April	Ocean Vengeance	Ocean ship	Permanente Metals Corporation	Richmond, California	United States	For War Shipping Administration.
26 April	John C. Colhoun	Liberty ship	North Carolina Shipbuilding Company	Wilmington, North Carolina	United States	For War Shipping Administration.
26 April	Samuel Huntington	Liberty ship	Permanente Metals Corporation	Richmond, California	United States	For War Shipping Administration.
27 April	Esek Hopkins	Liberty ship	Bethlehem Fairfield Shipyard	Baltimore, Maryland	United States	For War Shipping Administration.
27 April	Haldon	Hunt-class destroyer	Fairfield	Glasgow	United Kingdom	Transferred to Free France as La Combattante
27 April	James Monroe	Liberty ship	California Shipbuilding Corporation	Los Angeles, California	United States	For War Shipping Administration.
27 April	Samuel Moody	Liberty ship	Oregon Shipbuilding Corporation	Portland, Oregon	United States	For War Shipping Administration.
29 April	Avristan	Cargo ship	William Doxford & Sons Ltd.	Pallion	United Kingdom	For Strick Line (1923) Ltd.
29 April	King Haakon VII	PC class escort ship	Geo. Lawley	Neponset, Massachusetts	Norway	Ex-USS PC-467
29 April	Matthew Maury	Liberty ship	Todd Houston Shipbuilding Corporation	Houston, Texas	United States	For War Shipping Administration.
29 April	Shahjehan	Cargo ship	Lithgows Ltd.	Port Glasgow	United Kingdom	For Asiatic Steam Navigation Co. Ltd.
30 April	Empire Farm	Warrior type tug	Scott & Sons Ltd.	Bowling	United Kingdom	For Ministry of War Transport.
30 April	Empire Gnome	Near-Warrior type tug	A. Hall & Co. Ltd.	Aberdeen	United Kingdom	For Ministry of War Transport.
30 April	John Hathorn	Liberty ship	California Shipbuilding Corporation	Los Angeles, California	United States	For War Shipping Administration.
30 April	John Sevier	Liberty ship	Oregon Shipbuilding Corporation	Portland, Oregon	United States	For War Shipping Administration.
30 April	Ocean Vagrant	Ocean ship	Permanente Metals Corporation	Richmond, California	United States	For War Shipping Administration.
30 April	Tanatside	Hunt-class destroyer	Yarrow Shipbuilders	Scotstoun, Glasgow	United Kingdom	
30 April	Obedient	O-class destroyer	William Denny & Brothers	Dumbarton	United Kingdom	
30 April	Thomas McKean	Liberty ship	Bethlehem Fairfield Shipyard	Baltimore, Maryland	United States	For War Shipping Administration.
April	Joseph M. Walsh	Tug	Alabama Drydock and Shipbuilding Company	Mobile, Alabama	United States	For Mobile Towing.

== May ==
Date	Ship	Class	Builder	Location	Country	Notes
1 May	Empire Gareth	Scandinavian type cargo ship	William Gray & Co. Ltd.	West Hartlepool	United Kingdom	For Ministry of War Transport.
1 May	VIC 11	VIC lighter	Goole Shipbuilding & Repairing Co. Ltd.	Goole	United Kingdom	For the Admiralty.
2 May	Barnes	Bogue-class escort carrier	Seattle-Tacoma Shipyard	Tacoma	United States	Converted C3 merchant freighter
2 May	Empire Lionel	Cargo ship	William Gray & Co. Ltd.	West Hartlepool	United Kingdom	For Ministry of War Transport.
2 May	Inverell	Bathurst-class corvette	Mort's Dock & Engineering Co	Balmain, New South Wales	Australia	
2 May	Redoubt	R-class destroyer	John Brown & Company	Clydebank	United Kingdom	To India as Ranjit 1949
4 May	Stancleeve	Cargo ship	William Pickersgill & Co. Ltd.	Southwick	United Kingdom	For Stanhope Steamship Co. Ltd.
5 May	Edwin Markham	Liberty ship	California Shipbuilding Corporation	Los Angeles, California	United States	For War Shipping Administration.
5 May	Jonathan Edwards	Liberty ship	Oregon Shipbuilding Corporation	Portland, Oregon	United States	For War Shipping Administration.
6 May	Alexander Macomb	Liberty ship	Bethlehem Fairfield Shipyard	Baltimore, Maryland	United States	For War Shipping Administration.
6 May	VIC 12	VIC lighter	Goole Shipbuilding & Repairing Co. Ltd.	Goole	United Kingdom	For the Admiralty.
7 May	Oliver Wendell Holmes	Liberty ship	Oregon Shipbuilding Corporation	Portland, Oregon	United States	For War Shipping Administration.
7 May	Prince William	Bogue-class escort carrier	Western Pipe & Steel		United States	Converted C3 merchant freighter for Lend-Lease
9 May	George Matthews	Liberty ship	California Shipbuilding Corporation	Los Angeles, California	United States	For War Shipping Administration.
9 May	Ocean Viscount	Ocean ship	Permanente Metals Corporation	Richmond, California	United States	For War Shipping Administration.
9 May	Thomas B. Robertson	Liberty ship	Delta Shipbuilding	New Orleans, Louisiana	United States	For War Shipping Administration.
9 May	William Ellery	Liberty ship	Permanente Metals Corporation	Richmond, California	United States	For War Shipping Administration.
10 May	Charles C. Pinckney	Liberty ship	North Carolina Shipbuilding Company	Wilmington, North Carolina	United States	For War Shipping Administration.
11 May	Walt Whitman	Liberty ship	Oregon Shipbuilding Corporation	Portland, Oregon	United States	For War Shipping Administration.
12 May	Eleazar Wheelock	Liberty ship	Bethlehem Fairfield Shipyard	Baltimore, Maryland	United States	For War Shipping Administration.
12 May	Winfield Scott	Liberty ship	Todd Houston Shipbuilding Corporation	Houston, Texas	United States	For War Shipping Administration.
13 May	Empire Head	Coaster	Clelands (Successors) Ltd.	Wallsend	United Kingdom	For Ministry of War Transport.
13 May	F. A. C. Muhlenberg	Liberty ship	California Shipbuilding Corporation	Los Angeles, California	United States	For War Shipping Administration.
13 May	VIC 8	VIC lighter	Richard Dunston Ltd.	Thorne	United Kingdom	For the War Department.
14 May	Empire Garrick	Ocean type tanker	Swan, Hunter & Wigham Richardson Ltd.	Wallsend	United Kingdom	For Ministry of War Transport.
14 May	Empire Guinevere	Cargo ship	William Denny and Bros. Ltd.	Dumbarton	United Kingdom	For Ministry of War Transport.
14 May	Empire Hazlitt	Cargo ship	John Readhead & Sons Ltd.	South Shields	United Kingdom	For Ministry of War Transport.
14 May	Empire Iseult	Cargo ship	J. L. Thompson & Sons Ltd.	Sunderland	United Kingdom	For Ministry of War Transport.
14 May	Henry St. G. Tucker	Liberty ship	Bethlehem Fairfield Shipyard	Baltimore, Maryland	United States	For War Shipping Administration.
14 May	Ocean Verity	Ocean ship	Permanente Metals Corporation	Richmond, California	United States	For War Shipping Administration.
14 May	Winsor	Collier	Burntisland Shipbuilding Company	Burntisland	United Kingdom	For Gas, Light & Coke Co. Ltd.
15 May	Core	Bogue-class escort carrier	Seattle-Tacoma Shipyard	Tacoma	United States	Converted C3 merchant freighter
15 May	Empire Southey	Cargo ship	Short Brothers Ltd.	Sunderland	United Kingdom	For Ministry of War Transport.
15 May	J. L. M. Curry	Liberty ship	Alabama Drydock and Shipbuilding Company	Mobile, Alabama	United States	For War Shipping Administration.
15 May	John Davenport	Liberty ship	New England Shipbuilding Corporation	South Portland, Maine	United States	For War Shipping Administration.
15 May	Mobile	Cleveland-class light cruiser	Newport News Shipbuilding & Dry Dock Company	Newport News, Virginia	United States	
16 May	Abraham Baldwin	Liberty ship	Delta Shipbuilding	New Orleans, Louisiana	United States	For War Shipping Administration.
16 May	Horsham	Bathurst-class corvette	HMA Naval Dockyard	Melbourne	Australia	
16 May	John B. Ashe	Liberty ship	California Shipbuilding Corporation	Los Angeles, California	United States	For War Shipping Administration.
16 May	Mark Twain	Liberty ship	Oregon Shipbuilding Corporation	Portland, Oregon	United States	For War Shipping Administration.
17 May	John Cropper	Liberty ship	North Carolina Shipbuilding Company	Wilmington, North Carolina	United States	For War Shipping Administration.
18 May	Empire Galahad	Refrigerated cargo ship	Lithgows	Port Glasgow	United Kingdom	For Ministry of War Transport
18 May	Thomas Ruffin	Liberty ship	Bethlehem Fairfield Shipyard	Baltimore, Maryland	United States	For War Shipping Administration.
19 May	John Page	Liberty ship	California Shipbuilding Corporation	Los Angeles, California	United States	For War Shipping Administration.
22 May	Altamaha	Bogue-class escort carrier	Seattle-Tacoma Shipyard	Tacoma	United States	Converted C3 merchant freighter
22 May	Empire Imp	Maple-type tug	Richard Dunston Ltd.	Thorne	United Kingdom	For the Admiralty.
22 May	Irwin MacDowell	Liberty ship	Permanente Metals Corporation	Richmond, California	United States	For War Shipping Administration.
22 May	James Fenimore Cooper	Liberty ship	Oregon Shipbuilding Corporation	Portland, Oregon	United States	For War Shipping Administration.
22 May	Lewis Morris	Liberty ship	Permanente Metals Corporation	Richmond, California	United States	For War Shipping Administration.
22 May	Michael J. Stone	Liberty ship	Todd Houston Shipbuilding Corporation	Houston, Texas	United States	For War Shipping Administration.
22 May	Mormacpenn	C3 merchant freighter	Ingalls Shipbuilding	Pascagoula, Mississippi	United States	Converted to escort carrier HMS Hunter in 1943
22 May	Ocean Viceroy	Ocean ship	Permanente Metals Corporation	Richmond, California	United States	For War Shipping Administration.
22 May	Richard Bassett	Liberty ship	Bethlehem Fairfield Shipyard	Baltimore, Maryland	United States	For War Shipping Administration.
22 May	Stephen F. Austin	Liberty ship	Todd Houston Shipbuilding Corporation	Houston, Texas	United States	For War Shipping Administration.
22 May	Thomas Bailey Aldrich	Liberty ship	Oregon Shipbuilding Corporation	Portland, Oregon	United States	For War Shipping Administration.
22 May	Washington Irving	Liberty ship	Oregon Shipbuilding Corporation	Portland, Oregon	United States	For War Shipping Administration.
22 May	William Johnson	Liberty ship	Bethlehem Fairfield Shipyard	Baltimore, Maryland	United States	For War Shipping Administration.
22 May	William Moultrie	Liberty ship	North Carolina Shipbuilding Company	Wilmington, North Carolina	United States	For War Shipping Administration.
23 May	John Schureman	Liberty ship	California Shipbuilding Corporation	Los Angeles, California	United States	For War Shipping Administration.
27 May	Cadmus	Algerine-class Mineweeper	Harland & Wolff	Belfast	United Kingdom	For Royal Navy.
27 May	Munin	Mode-class destroyer	Öresundsvarvet	Landskrona	Sweden	For Swedish Navy
27 May	Peter Silvester	Liberty ship	California Shipbuilding Corporation	Los Angeles, California	United States	For War Shipping Administration.
28 May	Cormull	C-type coaster	S. P. Austin & Sons Ltd.	Sunderland	United Kingdom	For Wm. Cory & Son Ltd.
28 May	Empire Piper	Near-Warrior type tug	Clelands (Successors) Ltd.	Willington Quay-on-Tyne	United Kingdom	For Ministry of War Transport.
28 May	Empire Strength	Cargo ship	Harland & Wolff	Belfast	United Kingdom	For Ministry of War Transport.
28 May	Matheran	Cargo ship	William Hamilton & Co. Ltd.	Port Glasgow	United Kingdom	For T. & J. Brocklebank Ltd.
28 May	MOWT 7	Crane barge	Fleming & Ferguson Ltd.	Paisley	United Kingdom	For Ministry of War Transport.
29 May	Bret Harte	Liberty ship	Oregon Shipbuilding Corporation	Portland, Oregon	United States	For War Shipping Administration.
29 May	Canara	Cargo ship	Barclay, Curle & Co. Ltd.	Glasgow	United Kingdom	For British India Steam Navigation Company.
29 May	David S. Terry	Liberty ship	Todd Houston Shipbuilding Corporation	Houston, Texas	United States	For War Shipping Administration.
29 May	Empire Wordsworth	Norwegian type tanker	Sir J. Laing & Sons Ltd.	Sunderland	United Kingdom	For .
29 May	Houston City	Cargo ship	William Doxford & Sons Ltd.	Pallion	United Kingdom	For Reardon Smith Line Ltd.
30 May	Activity	Refrigerated cargo ship	Caledon Shipbuilding & Engineering Co. Ltd.	Dundee	United Kingdom	For the Admiralty. Completed as escort carrier HMS Activity.
30 May	Empire Guidon	Cargo ship	Furness Shipbuilding Co Ltd	Haverton Hill-on-Tees	United Kingdom	For Ministry of War Transport.
30 May	Empire Pat	Near-Warrior type tug	Cochrane & Sons Ltd.	Selby	United Kingdom	For Ministry of War Transport.
30 May	San Veronico	Tanker	Harland & Wolff	Belfast	United Kingdom	For Eagle Oil & Shipping Co. Ltd.
30 May	Theodore Bland	Liberty ship	Delta Shipbuilding	New Orleans, Louisiana	United States	For War Shipping Administration.
30 May	William Paca	Liberty ship	Bethlehem Fairfield Shipyard	Baltimore, Maryland	United States	For War Shipping Administration.
31 May	Anne Hutchinson	Liberty ship	Oregon Shipbuilding Corporation	Portland, Oregon	United States	For War Shipping Administration.
31 May	John Marshall	Liberty ship	Alabama Drydock and Shipbuilding Company	Mobile, Alabama	United States	For War Shipping Administration.
31 May	Thomas Sumter	Liberty ship	North Carolina Shipbuilding Company	Wilmington, North Carolina	United States	For War Shipping Administration.

== June ==
Date	Ship	Class	Builder	Location	Country	Notes
1 June	Empire Sam	Near-Warrior type tug	Cochrane & Sons Ltd.	Selby	United Kingdom	For Ministry of War Transport.
1 June	Hardingham	Cargo ship	William Doxford & Sons Ltd.	Pallion	United Kingdom	For Willis Steamship Co. Ltd.
1 June	Nassa	Tanker	Blythswood Shipbuilding Co. Ltd.	Glasgow	United Kingdom	For Anglo-Saxon Petroleum Co. Ltd.
1 June	Quail	Q-class destroyer	Hawthorn Leslie	Hebburn	United Kingdom	
1 June	Racehorse	R-class destroyer	John Brown & Company	Clydebank	United Kingdom	
2 June	Empire Boswell	Scandinavian type cargo ship	William Gray & Co. Ltd.	West Hartlepool	United Kingdom	For Ministry of War Transport.
2 June	Empire Cupid	Warrior type tug	Scott & Sons	Bowling	United Kingdom	For Ministry of War Transport.
2 June	Nuculana	Tanker	R. & W. Hawthorn, Leslie and Co. Ltd.	Newcastle on Tyne	United Kingdom	For Anglo-Saxon Petroleum Co Ltd.
3 June	Egbert Benson	Liberty ship	California Shipbuilding Corporation	Los Angeles, California	United States	For War Shipping Administration.
3 June	Ocean Virtue	Ocean ship	Permanente Metals Corporation	Richmond, California	United States	For War Shipping Administration.
4 June	Empire Meadow	Near-Warrior type tug	J. S. Watson Ltd.	Gainsborough	United Kingdom	For Ministry of War Transport.
4 June	John Harvard	Liberty ship	Oregon Shipbuilding Corporation	Portland, Oregon	United States	For War Shipping Administration.
4 June	VIC 9	VIC lighter	Richard Dunston Ltd.	Thorne	United Kingdom	For the Admiralty.
4 June	Oliver Ellsworth	Liberty ship	Bethlehem Fairfield Shipyard	Baltimore, Maryland	United States	For War Shipping Administration.
6 June	Block Island	Bogue-class escort carrier	Seattle-Tacoma Shipyard	Tacoma	United States	Converted C3 merchant freighter
6 June	George B. McClellan	Liberty ship	Permanente Metals Corporation	Richmond, California	United States	For War Shipping Administration.
7 June	Elihu Yale	Liberty ship	Oregon Shipbuilding Corporation	Portland, Oregon	United States	For War Shipping Administration.
7 June	Isaac Coles	Liberty ship	California Shipbuilding Corporation	Los Angeles, California	United States	For War Shipping Administration.
7 June	Jeremiah Van Rensselaer	Liberty ship	North Carolina Shipbuilding Company	Wilmington, North Carolina	United States	For War Shipping Administration.
7 June	John Winthrop	Liberty ship	New England Shipbuilding Corporation	South Portland, Maine	United States	For War Shipping Administration.
7 June	Ocean Valentine	Ocean ship	Permanente Metals Corporation	Richmond, California	United States	For War Shipping Administration.
8 June	James Gunn	Liberty ship	Bethlehem Fairfield Shipyard	Baltimore, Maryland	United States	For War Shipping Administration.
9 June	Stephen Johnson Field	Liberty ship	California Shipbuilding Corporation	Los Angeles, California	United States	For War Shipping Administration.
10 June	Santa Fe	Cleveland-class light cruiser	New York Shipbuilding Corporation	Camden, New Jersey	United States	
11 June	Bowen	Bathurst-class corvette	Walkers Limited	Maryborough	Australia	
12 June	Joseph McKenna	Liberty ship	California Shipbuilding Corporation	Los Angeles, California	United States	For War Shipping Administration.
12 June	William Travis	Liberty ship	Todd Houston Shipbuilding Corporation	Houston, Texas	United States	For War Shipping Administration.
13 June	Lambrook	Cargo ship	Burntisland Shipbuilding Company	Burntisland	United Kingdom	For Austin Friars Steamship Co.
13 June	Ocean Vanquisher	Ocean ship	Permanente Metals Corporation	Richmond, California	United States	For War Shipping Administration.
14 June	Artemis Ward	Liberty ship	North Carolina Shipbuilding Company	Wilmington, North Carolina	United States	For War Shipping Administration.
14 June	John Wise	Liberty ship	Permanente Metals Corporation	Richmond, California	United States	For War Shipping Administration.
14 June	Samuel Johnston	Liberty ship	Bethlehem Fairfield Shipyard	Baltimore, Maryland	United States	For War Shipping Administration.
14 June	Theodore Foster	Liberty ship	Bethlehem Fairfield Shipyard	Baltimore, Maryland	United States	For War Shipping Administration.
14 June	William M. Stewart	Liberty ship	California Shipbuilding Corporation	Los Angeles, California	United States	For War Shipping Administration.
15 June	Benjamin Contee	Liberty ship	Delta Shipbuilding	New Orleans, Louisiana	United States	For War Shipping Administration.
15 June	Empire Mordred	Cargo ship	C. Connell & Co. Ltd.	Glasgow	United Kingdom	For Ministry of War Transport.
16 June	Cornelius Gilliam	Liberty ship	Oregon Shipbuilding Corporation	Portland, Oregon	United States	For War Shipping Administration.
16 June	Empire Lytton	Norwegian type tanker	Furness Shipbuilding Co. Ltd.	Haverton Hill-on-Tees	United Kingdom	For Ministry of War Transport.
17 June	Shahzada	Cargo ship	Lithgows Ltd.	Port Glasgow	United Kingdom	For Asiatic Steam Navigation Co. Ltd.
18 June	George H. Williams	Liberty ship	Oregon Shipbuilding Corporation	Portland, Oregon	United States	For War Shipping Administration.
18 June	John Henry	Liberty ship	Bethlehem Fairfield Shipyard	Baltimore, Maryland	United States	For War Shipping Administration.
19 June	Latrobe	Bathurst-class corvette	Mort's Dock & Engineering Co	Balmain, New South Wales	Australia	
19 June	Mirabeau B. Lamar	Liberty ship	Todd Houston Shipbuilding Corporation	Houston, Texas	United States	For War Shipping Administration.
19 June	Willie Van Devanter	Liberty ship	California Shipbuilding Corporation	Los Angeles, California	United States	For War Shipping Administration.
20 June	Joseph Hooker	Liberty ship	Permanente Metals Corporation	Richmond, California	United States	For War Shipping Administration.
20 June	Wensleydale	Hunt-class destroyer	Yarrow Shipbuilders	Scotstoun, Glasgow	United Kingdom	
21 June	Edward Rutledge	Liberty ship	North Carolina Shipbuilding Company	Wilmington, North Carolina	United States	For War Shipping Administration.
21 June	John Steele	Liberty ship	California Shipbuilding Corporation	Los Angeles, California	United States	For War Shipping Administration.
22 June	William MacLay	Liberty ship	Bethlehem Fairfield Shipyard	Baltimore, Maryland	United States	For War Shipping Administration.
23 June	George Thacher	Liberty ship	California Shipbuilding Corporation	Los Angeles, California	United States	For War Shipping Administration.
23 June	Kapunda	Bathurst-class corvette	Poole & Steel	Balmain, New South Wales	Australia	
23 June	Matthew P. Deady	Liberty ship	Oregon Shipbuilding Corporation	Portland, Oregon	United States	For War Shipping Administration.
24 June	Kale	River-class frigate	Harland & Wolff	Belfast	United Kingdom	For Royal Navy.
25 June	Benjamin Rush	Liberty ship	Bethlehem Fairfield Shipyard	Baltimore, Maryland	United States	For War Shipping Administration.
25 June	Huron	Tribal-class destroyer	Vickers-Armstrongs	Newcastle upon Tyne	Canada	
26 June	Coombe Hill	Cargo ship	William Doxford & Sons Ltd.	Pallion	United Kingdom	For Putney Hill Steamship Co. Ltd.
26 June	Junecrest	Cargo ship	Lithgows Ltd.	Port Glasgow	United Kingdom	For Crest Shipping Co. Ltd.
26 June	William Patterson	Liberty ship	Bethlehem Fairfield Shipyard	Baltimore, Maryland	United States	For War Shipping Administration.
27 June	Brecon	Hunt-class destroyer	John I. Thornycroft & Company	Woolston, Southamton	United Kingdom	
27 June	Breton	Bogue-class escort carrier	Seattle-Tacoma Shipyard	Tacoma	United States	Converted C3 merchant freighter
27 June	Circe	Algerine-class minesweeper	Harland & Wolff	Belfast	United Kingdom	For Royal Navy.
27 June	Empire Galliard	Cargo ship	J. L. Thompson & Sons Ltd.	Sunderland	United Kingdom	For Ministry of War Transport.
27 June	Jason Lee	Liberty ship	Oregon Shipbuilding Corporation	Portland, Oregon	United States	For War Shipping Administration.
27 June	Juan Cabrillo	Liberty ship	California Shipbuilding Corporation	Los Angeles, California	United States	For War Shipping Administration.
27 June	Ocean Victory	Ocean ship	Permanente Metals	Richmond, California	United States	For Ministry of War Transport.
28 June	Abel Parker Upshur	Liberty ship	North Carolina Shipbuilding Company	Wilmington, North Carolina	United States	For War Shipping Administration.
29 June	Empire Archer	Cargo ship	Caledon Shipbuilding & Engineering Company	Dundee	United Kingdom	For Ministry of War Transport
29 June	Empire Banner	Cargo ship	Bartram & Sons Ltd	Sunderland	United Kingdom	For Ministry of War Transport
29 June	Empire Collins	Norwegian type tanker	Sir J. Laing & Sons Ltd.	Sunderland	United Kingdom	For Ministry of War Transport.
29 June	Empire Damsel	Coaster	Grangemouth Dockyard Co. Ltd.	Grangemouth	United Kingdom	For Ministry of War Transport
29 June	Empire Patriot	Scandinavian type cargo ship	William Gray & Co. Ltd.	West Hartlepool	United Kingdom	For Ministry of War Transport.
29 June	Empire Standard	Cargo ship	Sir W. G. Armstrong, Whitworth & Co. Ltd.	Newcastle upon Tyne	United Kingdom	For Ministry of War Transport.
29 June	Empire Titan	Near-Warrior type tug	Henry Scarr Ltd	Hessle	United Kingdom	For Ministry of War Transport.
29 June	Francis Parkman	Liberty ship	California Shipbuilding Corporation	Los Angeles, California	United States	For War Shipping Administration.
29 June	George Ross	Liberty ship	Permanente Metals Corporation	Richmond, California	United States	For War Shipping Administration.
29 June	Woodpecker	Modified Black Swan-class sloop	William Denny & Brothers	Dumbarton	United Kingdom	
30 June	Empire Buckler	Cargo ship	Lithgows Ltd	Port Glasgow	United Kingdom	For the Ministry of War Transport
30 June	Empire Clarion	Cargo ship	William Gray & Co Ltd	West Hartlepool	United Kingdom	For the Ministry of War Transport
30 June	Empire Metal	Ocean type tanker	Harland & Wolff	Govan	United Kingdom	For Ministry of War Transport.
30 June	Harpalyce	Cargo ship	William Doxford & Sons Ltd.	Pallion	United Kingdom	For National Steamship Co. Ltd.
30 June	Henry Clay	Liberty ship	Alabama Drydock and Shipbuilding Company	Mobile, Alabama	United States	For War Shipping Administration.
30 June	Junipero Serra	Liberty ship	California Shipbuilding Corporation	Los Angeles, California	United States	For War Shipping Administration.
30 June	Marcus Whitman	Liberty ship	Oregon Shipbuilding Corporation	Portland, Oregon	United States	For War Shipping Administration.
30 June	Stanhill	Cargo ship	William Pickersgill & Co. Ltd.	Southwick	United Kingdom	For Stanhope Steamship Co. Ltd.

== July ==
Date	Ship	Class	Builder	Location	Country	Notes
1 July	Empire Thackeray	Scandinavian type cargo ship	Sir J. Laing & Sons Ltd.	Sunderland	United Kingdom	For Ministry of War Transport.
3 July	Benjamin Bourne	Liberty ship	Todd Houston Shipbuilding Corporation	Houston, Texas	United States	For War Shipping Administration.
3 July	Cuillin	Ferry	William Denny and Brothers Ltd.	Dumbarton	United Kingdom	For London, Midland and Scottish Railway.
3 July	John Fiske	Liberty ship	California Shipbuilding Corporation	Los Angeles, California	United States	For War Shipping Administration.
3 July	William Hawkins	Liberty ship	North Carolina Shipbuilding Company	Wilmington, North Carolina	United States	For War Shipping Administration.
4 July	George Vancouver	Liberty ship	Kaiser Company	Vancouver, Washington	United States	For War Shipping Administration.
4 July	James Smith	Liberty ship	Permanente Metals Corporation	Richmond, California	United States	For War Shipping Administration.
4 July	John McLoughlin	Liberty ship	Oregon Shipbuilding Corporation	Portland, Oregon	United States	For War Shipping Administration.
4 July	Joseph Stanton	Liberty ship	Bethlehem Fairfield Shipyard	Baltimore, Maryland	United States	For War Shipping Administration.
4 July	Luther Martin	Liberty ship	Bethlehem Fairfield Shipyard	Baltimore, Maryland	United States	For War Shipping Administration.
4 July	William Wirt	Liberty ship	Bethlehem Fairfield Shipyard	Baltimore, Maryland	United States	For War Shipping Administration.
7 July	Hugh Williamson	Liberty ship	North Carolina Shipbuilding Company	Wilmington, North Carolina	United States	For War Shipping Administration.
7 July	Jesse Applegate	Liberty ship	Oregon Shipbuilding Corporation	Portland, Oregon	United States	For War Shipping Administration.
8 July	ArthurS Middleton	Liberty ship	Alabama Drydock and Shipbuilding Company	Mobile, Alabama	United States	For War Shipping Administration.
8 July	Empire Toby	Maple-type tug	Richard Dunston Ltd.	Thorne	United Kingdom	For Ministry of War Transport.
9 July	George Taylor	Liberty ship	Permanente Metals Corporation	Richmond, California	United States	For War Shipping Administration.
10 July	John A. Sutter	Liberty ship	California Shipbuilding Corporation	Los Angeles, California	United States	For War Shipping Administration.
10 July	Reverdy Johnson	Liberty ship	Bethlehem Fairfield Shipyard	Baltimore, Maryland	United States	For War Shipping Administration.
11 July	Daniel Carroll	Liberty ship	Todd Houston Shipbuilding Corporation	Houston, Texas	United States	For War Shipping Administration.
11 July	Easton	Hunt-class destroyer	J Samuel White	Cowes	United Kingdom	For Royal Navy
11 July	Empire Reynard	Coaster	Richards Ironworks Ltd.	Lowestoft	United Kingdom	For Ministry of War Transport.
11 July	George Abernethy	Liberty ship	Oregon Shipbuilding Corporation	Portland, Oregon	United States	For War Shipping Administration.
12 July	Richard Henry Dana	Liberty ship	California Shipbuilding Corporation	Los Angeles, California	United States	For War Shipping Administration.
12 July	William R. Davie	Liberty ship	North Carolina Shipbuilding Company	Wilmington, North Carolina	United States	For War Shipping Administration.
13 July	John H. B. Latrobe	Liberty ship	Bethlehem Fairfield Shipyard	Baltimore, Maryland	United States	For War Shipping Administration.
13 July	Edward Rowland Sill	Liberty ship	Permanente Metals Corporation	Richmond, California	United States	For War Shipping Administration.
13 July	Thomas Hooker	Liberty ship	New England Shipbuilding Corporation	South Portland, Maine	United States	For War Shipping Administration.
14 July	Empire Ruskin	Cargo ship	John Readhead & Sons Ltd.	South Shields	United Kingdom	For Ministry of War Transport.
14 July	Empire Sinew	Warrior type tug	Scott & Sons Ltd	Bowling	United Kingdom	For Ministry of War Transport.
14 July	Firedog	C-type coaster	S. P. Austin & Sons Ltd.	Sunderland	United Kingdom	For Gas, Light & Coke Co. Ltd.
14 July	Hartlepool	Bangor-class minesweeper	Blyth Dry Docks & Shipbuilding Co. Ltd	Blyth, Northumberland	United Kingdom	For Royal Navy.
14 July	Joseph Lane	Liberty ship	Oregon Shipbuilding Corporation	Portland, Oregon	United States	For War Shipping Administration.
14 July	William Whipple	Liberty ship	Permanente Metals Corporation	Richmond, California	United States	For War Shipping Administration.
15 July	Carlton	Cargo ship	Burntisland Shipbuilding Company	Burntisland	United Kingdom	For R. Chapman & Son Ltd.
15 July	George Bancroft	Liberty ship	California Shipbuilding Corporation	Los Angeles, California	United States	For War Shipping Administration.
15 July	George Gale	Liberty ship	Delta Shipbuilding	New Orleans, Louisiana	United States	For War Shipping Administration.
15 July	Relentless	R-class destroyer	John Brown & Company	Clydebank	United Kingdom	
15 July	Richard H. Alvey	Liberty ship	Bethlehem Fairfield Shipyard	Baltimore, Maryland	United States	For War Shipping Administration.
16 July	Empire Reynolds	Ocean type tanker	Swan, Hunter & Wigham Richardson Ltd.	Wallsend	United Kingdom	For Ministry of War Transport.
16 July	Rapid	R-class destroyer	Cammell Laird	Birkenhead	United Kingdom	
16 July	Ravager	Attacker-class escort carrier	Seattle-Tacoma Shipyard	Tacoma	United States	Converted C3 merchant freighter for Lend-Lease
18 July	St. George	Bogue-class escort carrier	Ingalls Shipbuilding	Pascagoula, Mississippi	United States	Converted C3 merchant freighter
19July	Elias Howe	Liberty ship	Kaiser Company	Vancouver, Washington	United States	For War Shipping Administration.
19 July	Harvey W. Scott	Liberty ship	Oregon Shipbuilding Corporation	Portland, Oregon	United States	For War Shipping Administration.
19 July	James Ford Rhodes	Liberty ship	California Shipbuilding Corporation	Los Angeles, California	United States	For War Shipping Administration.
19 July	William Gaston	Liberty ship	North Carolina Shipbuilding Company	Wilmington, North Carolina	United States	For War Shipping Administration.
20 July	VIC 10	VIC lighter	Richard Dunston Ltd.	Thorne	United Kingdom	For the Admiralty.
21 July	James W. Nesmith	Liberty ship	Oregon Shipbuilding Corporation	Portland, Oregon	United States	For War Shipping Administration.
21 July	John Morton	Liberty ship	Permanente Metals Corporation	Richmond, California	United States	For War Shipping Administration.
21 July	William H. Prescott	Liberty ship	California Shipbuilding Corporation	Los Angeles, California	United States	For War Shipping Administration.
22 July	Joaquin Miller	Liberty ship	Permanente Metals Corporation	Richmond, California	United States	For War Shipping Administration.
22 July	John Walker	Liberty ship	Bethlehem Fairfield Shipyard	Baltimore, Maryland	United States	For War Shipping Administration.
23 July	Alexander H. Stephens	Liberty ship	Alabama Drydock and Shipbuilding Company	Mobile, Alabama	United States	For War Shipping Administration.
23 July	Empire Warlock	Near-Warrior type tug	Ferguson Brothers Ltd.	Port Glasgow	United Kingdom	For Ministry of War Transport.
24 July	Francis Lewis	Liberty ship	Permanente Metals Corporation	Richmond, California	United States	For War Shipping Administration.
24 July	Hilson R. Helper	Liberty ship	California Shipbuilding Corporation	Los Angeles, California	United States	For War Shipping Administration.
24 July	John C. Ainsworth	Liberty ship	Oregon Shipbuilding Corporation	Portland, Oregon	United States	For War Shipping Administration.
25 July	John P. Poe	Liberty ship	Bethlehem Fairfield Shipyard	Baltimore, Maryland	United States	For War Shipping Administration.
25 July	Nicholas Gilman	Liberty ship	Todd Houston Shipbuilding Corporation	Houston, Texas	United States	For War Shipping Administration.
26 July	William A. Graham	Liberty ship	North Carolina Shipbuilding Company	Wilmington, North Carolina	United States	For War Shipping Administration.
26 July	William F. Cody	Liberty ship	California Shipbuilding Corporation	Los Angeles, California	United States	For War Shipping Administration.
27 July	Tuzla	Ferry	Swan, Hunter & Wigham Richardson Ltd.	Newcastle upon Tyne	United Kingdom	For Turkish Government, owned by Ministry of War Transport before transfer to Turkish Government on 18 November 1943.
27 July	William P. McArthur	Liberty ship	Oregon Shipbuilding Corporation	Portland, Oregon	United States	For War Shipping Administration.
28 July	Baltimore	Baltimore-class heavy cruiser	Fore River Shipyard	Quincy, Massachusetts	United States	
28 July	City of Bristol	Cargo ship	Swan, Hunter & Wigham Richardson Ltd.	Wallsend	United Kingdom	For Ellerman's City Line Ltd.
28 July	Cygnet	Modified Black Swan-class sloop			United Kingdom	
28 July	Empire Webster	Cargo ship	Short Brothers Ltd.	Sunderland	United Kingdom	For Ministry of War Transport.
28 July	Greenock	Bangor-class minesweeper	Blyth Dry Docks & Shipbuilding Co. Ltd	Blyth, Northumberland	United Kingdom	For Royal Navy.
28 July	Mahratta	M-class destroyer	Scotts Shipbuilding and Engineering Company	Greenock	United Kingdom	
29 July	Bernard Carter	Liberty ship	Bethlehem Fairfield Shipyard	Baltimore, Maryland	United States	For War Shipping Administration.
29 July	Empire Wisdom	Cargo liner	Greenock Dockyard Co. Ltd.	Greenock	United Kingdom	For Ministry of War Transport.
29 July	Lew Wallace	Liberty ship	Permanente Metals Corporation	Richmond, California	United States	For War Shipping Administration.
29 July	Robert F. Stockton	Liberty ship	California Shipbuilding Corporation	Los Angeles, California	United States	For War Shipping Administration.
29 July	VIC 21	VIC lighter	Richard Dunston Ltd.	Thorne	United Kingdom	For the Admiralty.
30 July	British Promise	Tanker	Cammell Laird & Co. Ltd.	Birkenhead	United Kingdom	For British Tanker Co. Ltd.
30 July	Empire Centaur	Cargo ship	William Gray & Co Ltd	West Hartlepool	United Kingdom	For Ministry of War Transport
30 July	Empire Elaine	Heavy lift ship	Vickers-Armstrongs Ltd.	Barrow in Furness	United Kingdom	For Ministry of War Transport.
30 July	George Read	Liberty ship	Permanente Metals Corporation	Richmond, California	United States	For War Shipping Administration.
30 July	Thistledale	Cargo ship	J. L. Thompson & Sons Ltd.	Sunderland	United Kingdom	For The Albyn Line Ltd.
30 July	William B. Giles	Liberty ship	Delta Shipbuilding	New Orleans, Louisiana	United States	For War Shipping Administration.
31 July	Essex	Essex-class aircraft carrier	Newport News Shipbuilding	Newport News, Virginia	United States	
31 July	Eugene Skinner	Liberty ship	Oregon Shipbuilding Corporation	Portland, Oregon	United States	For War Shipping Administration.
31 July	John Carter Rose	Liberty ship	Bethlehem Fairfield Shipyard	Baltimore, Maryland	United States	For War Shipping Administration.
31 July	Starr King	Liberty ship	California Shipbuilding Corporation	Los Angeles, California	United States	For War Shipping Administration.
31 July	Thomas Heyward	Liberty ship	Alabama Drydock and Shipbuilding Company	Mobile, Alabama	United States	For War Shipping Administration.

== August ==
Date	Ship	Class	Builder	Location	Country	Notes
1 August	Croatan	Bogue-class escort carrier	Seattle-Tacoma Shipyard	Tacoma	United States	Converted C3 merchant freighter
2 August	James K. Polk	Liberty ship	North Carolina Shipbuilding Company	Wilmington, North Carolina	United States	For War Shipping Administration.
2 August	Samuel Griffin	Liberty ship	Todd Houston Shipbuilding Corporation	Houston, Texas	United States	For War Shipping Administration.
3 August	Roger Sherman	Liberty ship	Permanente Metals Corporation	Richmond, California	United States	For War Shipping Administration.
4 August	Leland Stanford	Liberty ship	California Shipbuilding Corporation	Los Angeles, California	United States	For War Shipping Administration.
4 August	Ocean Courier	Ocean ship	New England Shipbuilding Corporation	South Portland, Maine	United States	For War Shipping Administration.
4 August	Ocean Gallant	Ocean ship	New England Shipbuilding Corporation	South Portland, Maine	United States	For War Shipping Administration.
4 August	Ocean Seaman	Ocean ship	New England Shipbuilding Corporation	South Portland, Maine	United States	For War Shipping Administration.
4 August	Ocean Stranger	Ocean ship	New England Shipbuilding Corporation	South Portland, Maine	United States	For War Shipping Administration.
4 August	Ocean Traveller	Ocean ship	New England Shipbuilding Corporation	South Portland, Maine	United States	For War Shipping Administration.
4 August	Ocean Wayfarer	Ocean ship	New England Shipbuilding Corporation	South Portland, Maine	United States	For War Shipping Administration.
5 August	Daniel H. Lownsdale	Liberty ship	Oregon Shipbuilding Corporation	Portland, Oregon	United States	For War Shipping Administration.
6 August	John Hamilton	Liberty ship	Bethlehem Fairfield Shipyard	Baltimore, Maryland	United States	For War Shipping Administration.
7 August	Oliver Wolcott	Liberty ship	Permanente Metals Corporation	Richmond, California	United States	For War Shipping Administration.
7 August	Elijah White	Liberty ship	Oregon Shipbuilding Corporation	Portland, Oregon	United States	For War Shipping Administration.
7 August	William Tilghman	Liberty ship	Bethlehem Fairfield Shipyard	Baltimore, Maryland	United States	For War Shipping Administration.
8 August	Empire Fusilier	Ocean type tanker	Harland & Wolff	Belfast	United Kingdom	For Ministry of War Transport. Completed as Empire Bombardier.
8 August	Jonathan Grout	Liberty ship	Delta Shipbuilding	New Orleans, Louisiana	United States	For War Shipping Administration.
8 August	O. Henry	Liberty ship	Permanente Metals Corporation	Richmond, California	United States	For War Shipping Administration.
8 August	Francis Drake	Liberty ship	California Shipbuilding Corporation	Los Angeles, California	United States	For War Shipping Administration.
9 August	Daniel Huger	Liberty ship	Delta Shipbuilding	New Orleans, Louisiana	United States	For War Shipping Administration.
10 August	Benjamin Chew	Liberty ship	Bethlehem Fairfield Shipyard	Baltimore, Maryland	United States	For War Shipping Administration.
10 August	Peter H. Burnett	Liberty ship	California Shipbuilding Corporation	Los Angeles, California	United States	For War Shipping Administration.
11 August	Empire Dace	Ferry	Swan, Hunter & Wigham Richardson Ltd	Newcastle upon Tyne	United Kingdom	For Ministry of War Transport.
11 August	Harry Lane	Liberty ship	Oregon Shipbuilding Corporation	Portland, Oregon	United States	For War Shipping Administration.
11 August	Wren	Modified Black Swan-class sloop	William Denny & Brothers	Dumbarton	United Kingdom	
12 August	Espiegle	Algerine-class minesweeper	Harland & Wolff	Belfast	United Kingdom	For Royal Navy.
12 August	Matthew Thornton	Liberty ship	Permanente Metals Corporation	Richmond, California	United States	For War Shipping Administration.
12 August	Samuel Hartley	Liberty ship	Todd Houston Shipbuilding Corporation	Houston, Texas	United States	For War Shipping Administration.
13 August	Empire Launcelot	Scandinavian type cargo ship	Ailsa Shipbuilding & Co. Ltd.	Troon	United Kingdom	For Ministry of War Transport.
13 August	Ewing Young	Liberty ship	California Shipbuilding Corporation	Los Angeles, California	United States	For War Shipping Administration.
14 August	F. Marion Crawford	Liberty ship	Permanente Metals Corporation	Richmond, California	United States	For War Shipping Administration.
14 August	George Chamberlain	Liberty ship	Oregon Shipbuilding Corporation	Portland, Oregon	United States	For War Shipping Administration.
15 August	Jared Ingersoll	Liberty ship	Bethlehem Fairfield Shipyard	Baltimore, Maryland	United States	For War Shipping Administration.
15 August	Judah P. Bellingham	Liberty ship	Alabama Drydock and Shipbuilding Company	Mobile, Alabama	United States	For War Shipping Administration.
15 August	Peter Cartwright	Liberty ship	California Shipbuilding Corporation	Los Angeles, California	United States	For War Shipping Administration.
16 August	Alexander Martin	Liberty ship	North Carolina Shipbuilding Company	Wilmington, North Carolina	United States	For War Shipping Administration.
16 August	Ethan Allen	Liberty ship	New England Shipbuilding Corporation	South Portland, Maine	United States	For War Shipping Administration.
16 August	Ocean Gallant	Ocean ship	Todd Shipyards Corp.	South Portland, Maine	United States	For Ministry of War Transport.
16 August	Ocean Seaman	Ocean ship	Todd Shipyards Corp.	South Portland, Maine	United States	For Ministry of War Transport.
16 August	Ocean Stranger	Ocean ship	Todd Shipyards Corp.	South Portland, Maine	United States	For Ministry of War Transport.
16 August	Ocean Traveller	Ocean ship	Todd Shipyards Corp.	South Portland, Maine	United States	For Ministry of War Transport.
16 August	Ocean Wayfarer	Ocean ship	Todd Shipyards Corp.	South Portland, Maine	United States	For Ministry of War Transport.
17 August	Brigham Young	Liberty ship	California Shipbuilding Corporation	Los Angeles, California	United States	For War Shipping Administration.
17 August	Jonathan Herrington	Liberty ship	Oregon Shipbuilding Corporation	Portland, Oregon	United States	For War Shipping Administration.
17 August	Richard Stockton	Liberty ship	Permanente Metals Corporation	Richmond, California	United States	For War Shipping Administration.
18 August	Pierce Butler	Liberty ship	Bethlehem Fairfield Shipyard	Baltimore, Maryland	United States	For War Shipping Administration.
19 August	Horace Binney	Liberty ship	Bethlehem Fairfield Shipyard	Baltimore, Maryland	United States	For War Shipping Administration.
19 August	Horace Mann	Liberty ship	California Shipbuilding Corporation	Los Angeles, California	United States	For War Shipping Administration.
19 August	Theodore Sedgwick	Liberty ship	Todd Houston Shipbuilding Corporation	Houston, Texas	United States	For War Shipping Administration.
20 August	George Leonard	Liberty ship	Delta Shipbuilding	New Orleans, Louisiana	United States	For War Shipping Administration.
20 August	William H. Seward	Liberty ship	Oregon Shipbuilding Corporation	Portland, Oregon	United States	For War Shipping Administration.
21 August	John Sergeant	Liberty ship	Bethlehem Fairfield Shipyard	Baltimore, Maryland	United States	For War Shipping Administration.
21 August	Joseph Rodman Drake	Liberty ship	Permanente Metals Corporation	Richmond, California	United States	For War Shipping Administration.
21 August	MMS 233	MMS-class minesweeper	J. Bolson & Son Ltd.	Poole	United Kingdom	For Royal Navy.
21 August	William Williams	Liberty ship	Permanente Metals Corporation	Richmond, California	United States	For War Shipping Administration.
22 August	Daniel Heister	Liberty ship	Todd Houston Shipbuilding Corporation	Houston, Texas	United States	For War Shipping Administration.
22 August	Independence	Independence-class light aircraft carrier	New York Shipbuilding	New York City	United States	Converted cruiser hull
22 August	Jane Addams	Liberty ship	California Shipbuilding Corporation	Los Angeles, California	United States	For War Shipping Administration.
23 August	Gideon Welles	Liberty ship	Oregon Shipbuilding Corporation	Portland, Oregon	United States	For War Shipping Administration.
23 August	Prince William	Bogue-class escort carrier	Seattle-Tacoma Shipyard	Tacoma	United States	Converted C3 merchant freighter
23 August	Thomas Pinckney	Liberty ship	North Carolina Shipbuilding Company	Wilmington, North Carolina	United States	For War Shipping Administration.
25 August	Clara Barton	Liberty ship	California Shipbuilding Corporation	Los Angeles, California	United States	For War Shipping Administration.
25 August	Empire Grenadier	Norwegian type tanker	Furness Shipbuilding Co. Ltd.	Haverton Hill-on-Tees	United Kingdom	For Ministry of War Transport.
25 August	Empire Roach	Ferry	Swan, Hunter & Wigham Richardson Ltd	Newcastle upon Tyne	United Kingdom	For Ministry of War Transport.
25 August	Haida	Tribal-class destroyer	Vickers-Armstrongs	Newcastle upon Tyne	United Kingdom	
25 August	Jefferson Davis	Liberty ship	Alabama Drydock and Shipbuilding Company	Mobile, Alabama	United States	For War Shipping Administration.
25 August	Nordeflinge	Cargo ship	William Gray & Co. Ltd.	West Hartlepool	United Kingdom	For Constants Ltd.
25 August	Tower Hill	Cargo ship	William Doxford & Sons Ltd.	Pallion	United Kingdom	For Tower Steamship Co. Ltd.
25 August	Whimbrel	Modified Black Swan-class sloop	Yarrow Shipbuilders	Scoutstoun, Glasgow	United Kingdom	
25 August	William Rawle	Liberty ship	Bethlehem Fairfield Shipyard	Baltimore, Maryland	United States	For War Shipping Administration.
26 August	Boston	Baltimore-class heavy cruiser	Fore River Shipyard	Quincy, Massachusetts	United States	
26 August	Edwin M. Stanton	Liberty ship	Oregon Shipbuilding Corporation	Portland, Oregon	United States	For War Shipping Administration.
26 August	Eli Whitney	Liberty ship	Permanente Metals Corporation	Richmond, California	United States	For War Shipping Administration.
27 August	Black Prince	Dido-class cruiser	Harland & Wolff	Belfast	United Kingdom	For Royal Navy.
27 August	Empire Castle	Refrigerated cargo liner	Harland & Wolff	Belfast	United Kingdom	For Ministry of War Transport
27 August	Empire Cavalier	Norwegian type tanker	Sir J. Laing & Sons Ltd.	Sunderland	United Kingdom	For Ministry of War Transport.
27 August	Empire Melody	Scandinavian type cargo ship	Grangemouth Dockyard Co. Ltd.	Troon	United Kingdom	For Ministry of War Transport.
27 August	Empire Ned	Near-Warrior type tug	A. Hall & Co. Ltd.	Aberdeen	United Kingdom	For Ministry of War Transport.
27 August	Empire Pixie	Near-Warrior type tug	Goole Shipbuilding & Repairing Co. Ltd.	Goole	United Kingdom	For Ministry of War Transport.
27 August	Iowa	Iowa-class battleship	New York Navy Yard	Brooklyn, New York	United States	
27 August	Pierre S. Dupont	Liberty ship	Oregon Shipbuilding Corporation	Portland, Oregon	United States	For War Shipping Administration.
27 August	Tristram Dalton	Liberty ship	Bethlehem Fairfield Shipyard	Baltimore, Maryland	United States	For War Shipping Administration.
27 August	William Ellery Channing	Liberty ship	California Shipbuilding Corporation	Los Angeles, California	United States	For War Shipping Administration.
28 August	Cormain	Collier	Burntisland Shipbuilding Company	Burntisland	United Kingdom	For Wm. Cory & Son Ltd.
28 August	Harpagus	Cargo ship	William Doxford & Sons Ltd.	Pallion	United Kingdom	For National Steamship Co. Ltd.
28 August	John Fitch	Liberty ship	Permanente Metals Corporation	Richmond, California	United States	For War Shipping Administration.
28 August	Middlesex Trader	Cargo ship	J. L. Thompson & Sons Ltd.	Sunderland	United Kingdom	For Trader Navigation Co. Ltd.
29 August	Empire Kinsman	Cargo ship	Bartram & Sons Ltd	Sunderland	United Kingdom	For Ministry of War Transport.
29 August	William Dean Howells	Liberty ship	Permanente Metals Corporation	Richmond, California	United States	For War Shipping Administration.
30 August	Intrepid	Essex-class aircraft carrier	Newport News Shipbuilding	Newport News, Virginia	United States	
30 August	William Blount	Liberty ship	Delta Shipbuilding	New Orleans, Louisiana	United States	For War Shipping Administration.
31 August	Cleveland Abbe	Liberty ship	Oregon Shipbuilding Corporation	Portland, Oregon	United States	For War Shipping Administration.
31 August	Empire Gypsy	Coastal tanker	A. & J. Inglis Ltd.	Glasgow	United Kingdom	For Ministry of War Transport.
31 August	Empire Lancer	Cargo ship	Lithgows Ltd.	Port Glasgow	United Kingdom	For Ministry of War Transport.
31 August	John Howard Payne	Liberty ship	Permanente Metals Corporation	Richmond, California	United States	For War Shipping Administration.
31 August	Jonathan Elmer	Liberty ship	Bethlehem Fairfield Shipyard	Baltimore, Maryland	United States	For War Shipping Administration.
31 August	Thomas Lynch	Liberty ship	Alabama Drydock and Shipbuilding Company	Mobile, Alabama	United States	For War Shipping Administration.
31 August	Thomas T. Tucker	Liberty ship	Todd Houston Shipbuilding Corporation	Houston, Texas	United States	For War Shipping Administration.
31 August	Wendell Phillips	Liberty ship	California Shipbuilding Corporation	Los Angeles, California	United States	For War Shipping Administration.
August	VIC 14	VIC lighter	Isaac Pimblott & Sons Ltd.	Northwich	United Kingdom	For the Admiralty.

== September ==
Date	Ship	Class	Builder	Location	Country	Notes
1 September	Empire Geraint	Cargo ship	C. Connell & Co. Ltd.	Glasgow	United Kingdom	For Ministry of War Transport.
2 September	Empire Frank	Near-Warrior type tug	John Crown & Sons Ltd.	Sunderland	United Kingdom	For Ministry of War Transport.
2 September	Empire Pibroch	Cargo ship	Lithgows Ltd.	Port Glasgow	United Kingdom	For Ministry of War Transport.
2 September	VIC 22	VIC lighter	Richard Dunston Ltd.	Thorne	United Kingdom	For the Admiralty.
3 September	Andrew Carnegie	Liberty ship	Oregon Shipbuilding Corporation	Portland, Oregon	United States	For War Shipping Administration.
4 September	Ambrose E. Burnside	Liberty ship	Permanente Metals Corporation	Richmond, California	United States	For War Shipping Administration.
4 September	Felipe de Neve	Liberty ship	California Shipbuilding Corporation	Los Angeles, California	United States	For War Shipping Administration.
5 September	John Drayton	Liberty ship	North Carolina Shipbuilding Company	Wilmington, North Carolina	United States	For War Shipping Administration.
7 September	Andrew Furuseth	Liberty ship	Permanente Metals Corporation	Richmond, California	United States	For War Shipping Administration.
7 September	Andrew Moore	Liberty ship	Delta Shipbuilding	New Orleans, Louisiana	United States	For War Shipping Administration.
7 September	Benjamin Hawkins	Liberty ship	Bethlehem Fairfield Shipyard	Baltimore, Maryland	United States	For War Shipping Administration.
7 September	Charles Brantly Aycock	Liberty ship	Delta Shipbuilding	New Orleans, Louisiana	United States	For War Shipping Administration.
7 September	Glacier	Bogue-class escort carrier	Seattle-Tacoma Shipyard	Tacoma	United States	Converted C3 merchant freighter
7 September	James Duncan	Liberty ship	Oregon Shipbuilding Corporation	Portland, Oregon	United States	For War Shipping Administration.
7 September	James G. Blaine	Liberty ship	New England Shipbuilding Corporation	South Portland, Maine	United States	For War Shipping Administration.
7 September	Jeremiah Wadsworth	Liberty ship	Todd Houston Shipbuilding Corporation	Houston, Texas	United States	For War Shipping Administration.
7 September	John Mitchell	Liberty ship	Bethlehem Fairfield Shipyard	Baltimore, Maryland	United States	For War Shipping Administration.
7 September	John W. Brown	Liberty ship	Bethlehem Fairfield Shipyard	Baltimore, Maryland	United States	For War Shipping Administration.
7 September	Peter J. McGuire	Liberty ship	Permanente Metals Corporation	Richmond, California	United States	For War Shipping Administration.
7 September	Samuel Gompers	Liberty ship	California Shipbuilding Corporation	Los Angeles, California	United States	For War Shipping Administration.
8 September	Lapland	Cargo ship	Caledon Shipbuilding & Engineering Co. Ltd.	Dundee	United Kingdom	For Currie Line Ltd.
9 September	George H. Thomas	Liberty ship	Oregon Shipbuilding Corporation	Portland, Oregon	United States	For War Shipping Administration.
9 September	Horace Greely	Liberty ship	California Shipbuilding Corporation	Los Angeles, California	United States	For War Shipping Administration.
9 September	Philip H. Sheridan	Liberty ship	Permanente Metals Corporation	Richmond, California	United States	For War Shipping Administration.
10 September	Empire Cadet	Ferry	Swan, Hunter & Wigham Richardson Ltd	Newcastle upon Tyne	United Kingdom	For Ministry of War Transport
10 September	Empire Chub	Ferry	Swan, Hunter & Wigham Richardson Ltd.	Newcastle upon Tyne	United Kingdom	For Ministry of War Transport.
10 September	Growler	Bustler-class tug	Henry Robb Ltd.	Leith	United Kingdom	For the Admiralty.
11 September	Benjamin Huntington	Liberty ship	Todd Houston Shipbuilding Corporation	Houston, Texas	United States	For War Shipping Administration.
11 September	Empire Fred	Near-Warrior type tug	A. Hall & Co. Ltd.	Aberdeen	United Kingdom	For Ministry of War Transport.
11 September	Empire Hunter	Cargo ship	William Pickersgill & Co. Ltd.	Southwick	United Kingdom	For Ministry of War Transport.
11 September	Henry Ward Beecher	Liberty ship	California Shipbuilding Corporation	Los Angeles, California	United States	For War Shipping Administration.
11 September	Richard D. Spaight	Liberty ship	North Carolina Shipbuilding Company	Wilmington, North Carolina	United States	For War Shipping Administration.
11 September	William S. Rosecrans	Liberty ship	Oregon Shipbuilding Corporation	Portland, Oregon	United States	For War Shipping Administration.
12 September	Eggesford	Hunt-class destroyer	J. Samuel White	Cowes	United Kingdom	Sold to Federal German Navy in 1959 as Brommy
12 September	Empire Ace	Near-Warrior type tug	Cochrane & Sons Ltd.	Selby	United Kingdom	For Ministry of War Transport.
12 September	Joel Chandler Harris	Liberty ship	Alabama Drydock and Shipbuilding Company	Mobile, Alabama	United States	For War Shipping Administration.
13 September	Moses Rogers	Liberty ship	Permanente Metals Corporation	Richmond, California	United States	For War Shipping Administration.
13 September	Ralph Izard	Liberty ship	Bethlehem Fairfield Shipyard	Baltimore, Maryland	United States	For War Shipping Administration.
14 September	Empire Lakeland	Cargo ship	John Readhead & Sons Ltd.	South Shields	United Kingdom	For Ministry of War Transport.
14 September	Henry Villard	Liberty ship	Oregon Shipbuilding Corporation	Portland, Oregon	United States	For War Shipping Administration.
14 September	James Gordon Bennett	Liberty ship	California Shipbuilding Corporation	Los Angeles, California	United States	For War Shipping Administration.
15 September	David Bushnell	Liberty ship	Permanente Metals Corporation	Richmond, California	United States	For War Shipping Administration.
17 September	Hoe	Gato-class submarine	Electric Boat Company	Groton, Connecticut	United States	
17 September	Samuel Ashe	Liberty ship	North Carolina Shipbuilding Company	Wilmington, North Carolina	United States	For War Shipping Administration.
17 September	Samue Seabury	Liberty ship	Oregon Shipbuilding Corporation	Portland, Oregon	United States	For War Shipping Administration.
18 September	John Laurance	Liberty ship	Todd Houston Shipbuilding Corporation	Houston, Texas	United States	For War Shipping Administration.
18 September	Joseph Pulitzer	Liberty ship	California Shipbuilding Corporation	Los Angeles, California	United States	For War Shipping Administration.
18 September	LST-446	Landing Ship, Tank	Kaiser Company	Vancouver, Washington	United States	For United States Navy.
19 September	Chatham	Bogue-class escort carrier	Seattle-Tacoma Shipyard	Tacoma	United States	Converted C3 merchant freighter for Lend-Lease
19 September	James Caldwell	Liberty ship	Bethlehem Fairfield Shipyard	Baltimore, Maryland	United States	For War Shipping Administration.
19 September	James Rumsey	Liberty ship	Permanente Metals Corporation	Richmond, California	United States	For War Shipping Administration.
19 September	William K. Vanderbilt	Liberty ship	Permanente Metals Corporation	Richmond, California	United States	For War Shipping Administration.
20 September	Empire Ariel	Maple-type tug	Richard Dunston Ltd.	Thorne	United Kingdom	For Ministry of War Transport.
20 September	Mark Hanna	Liberty ship	Oregon Shipbuilding Corporation	Portland, Oregon	United States	For War Shipping Administration.
21 September	Caesar Rodney	Liberty ship	Bethlehem Fairfield Shipyard	Baltimore, Maryland	United States	For War Shipping Administration.
21 September	Malcolm M. Stewart	Liberty ship	California Shipbuilding Corporation	Los Angeles, California	United States	For War Shipping Administration.
22 September	Fantome	Algerine-class minesweeper	Harland & Wolff	Belfast	United Kingdom	For Royal Navy.
22 September	John Stevens	Liberty ship	Permanente Metals Corporation	Richmond, California	United States	For War Shipping Administration.
22 September	LST-447	Landing Ship, Tank	Kaiser Company	Vancouver, Washington	United States	For United States Navy.
22 September	Nicholas Biddle	Liberty ship	Bethlehem Fairfield Shipyard	Baltimore, Maryland	United States	For War Shipping Administration.
22 September	Samuel Livermore	Liberty ship	Todd Houston Shipbuilding Corporation	Houston, Texas	United States	For War Shipping Administration.
23 September	Benjamin Williams	Liberty ship	North Carolina Shipbuilding Company	Wilmington, North Carolina	United States	For War Shipping Administration.
23 September	Empire Grange	Cargo ship	Harland & Wolff	Belfast	United Kingdom	For Ministry of War Transport.
23 September	George A. Custer	Liberty ship	California Shipbuilding Corporation	Los Angeles, California	United States	For War Shipping Administration.
23 September	Joseph N. Teal	Liberty ship	Oregon Shipbuilding Corporation	Portland, Oregon	United States	For War Shipping Administration.
23 September	Lexington	Essex-class aircraft carrier	Bethlehem Steel Company	Quincy, Massachusetts	United States	
23 September	San Vulfrano	Tanker	Harland & Wolff Ltd.	Govan	United Kingdom	For Eagle Oil Co. Ltd.
24 September	Bushwood	C-type coaster	S. P. Austin & Sons Ltd.	Sunderland	United Kingdom	For .
24 September	Empire Driver	Cargo ship	William Gray & Co Ltd	West Hartlepool	United Kingdom	For Ministry of War Transport
! 24 September	Chanticleer	Modified Black Swan-class sloop			United Kingdom	
24 September	Empire Minnow	Modified Warrior-type tug	Scott & Sons Ltd.	Bowling	United Kingdom	For Ministry of War Transport.
24 September	Savage	Modified S-class destroyer	Hawthorn Leslie	Newcastle upon Tyne	United Kingdom	
24 September	HMS Thruster	Tank Landing Craft	Harland & Wolff	Belfast	United Kingdom	For Royal Navy.
25 September	Bardistan	Cargo ship	William Doxford & Sons Ltd.	Pallion	United Kingdom	For Strick Line (1923) Ltd.
25 September	Empire Envoy	Cargo ship	Short Brothers Ltd.	Sunderland	United Kingdom	For Ministry of War Transport
25 September	Empire Lorenzo	Scandinavian type cargo ship	William Gray & Co. Ltd.	West Hartlepool	United Kingdom	For Ministry of War Transport.
25 September	George G. Meade	Liberty ship	California Shipbuilding Corporation	Los Angeles, California	United States	For War Shipping Administration.
25 September	Glenelg	Bathurst-class corvette	Cockatoo Island Dockyard	Sydney	Australia	
25 September	Henry George	Liberty ship	Oregon Shipbuilding Corporation	Portland, Oregon	United States	For War Shipping Administration.
25 September	Highland Prince	Cargo ship	Burntisland Shipbuilding Company	Burntisland	United Kingdom	For Prince Line Ltd.
25 September	James J. Hill	Liberty ship	Permanente Metals Corporation	Richmond, California	United States	For War Shipping Administration.
25 September	Naticina	Tanker	R. & W. Hawthorn, Leslie and Co. Ltd.	Newcastle on Tyne	United Kingdom	For Anglo-Saxon Petroleum Co. Ltd.
26 September	British Gratitude	Tanker	Swan, Hunter & Wigham Richardson Ltd.	Wallsend	United Kingdom	For British Tanker Co. Ltd.
26 September	Edward Everett	Liberty ship	Oregon Shipbuilding Corporation	Portland, Oregon	United States	For War Shipping Administration.
26 September	Empire Denis	Near-Warrior type tug	Cochrane & Sons Ltd.	Selby	United Kingdom	For Ministry of War Transport.
26 September	George Weems	Liberty ship	Bethlehem Fairfield Shipyard	Baltimore, Maryland	United States	For War Shipping Administration.
26 September	Josiah Parker	Liberty ship	Delta Shipbuilding	New Orleans, Louisiana	United States	For War Shipping Administration.
26 September	LST-448	Landing Ship, Tank	Kaiser Company	Vancouver, Washington	United States	For United States Navy.
26 September	William A. Richardson	Liberty ship	Marinship Corporation	Sausalito, California	United States	For United States Maritime Commission.
27 September	Attacker	Attacker-class escort carrier	Western Pipe & Steel		United States	Converted C3 merchant freighter
27 September	Fitzjohn Porter	Liberty ship	California Shipbuilding Corporation	Los Angeles, California	United States	For War Shipping Administration.
27 September	Josiah Bartlett	Liberty ship	New England Shipbuilding Corporation	South Portland, Maine	United States	For War Shipping Administration.
28 September	Empire Nugget	Norwegian type tanker	Furness Shipbuilding Co. Ltd.	Haverton Hill-on-Tees	United Kingdom	For Ministry of War Transport.
28 September	Samuel F. B. Morse	Liberty ship	Permanente Metals Corporation	Richmond, California	United States	For War Shipping Administration.
29 September	Booker T. Washington	Liberty ship	California Shipbuilding Corporation	Los Angeles, California	United States	For War Shipping Administration.
29 September	James Turner	Liberty ship	North Carolina Shipbuilding Company	Wilmington, North Carolina	United States	For War Shipping Administration.
29 September	John Rutledge	Liberty ship	Permanente Metals Corporation	Richmond, California	United States	For War Shipping Administration.
29 September	Thistlemuir	Cargo ship	J. L. Thompson & Sons Ltd.	Sunderland	United Kingdom	For The Albyn Line Ltd.
30 September	Empire Pennant	Cargo ship	Lithgows Ltd.	Port Glasgow	United Kingdom	For Ministry of War Transport.
30 September	James McNeill Whistler	Liberty ship	Oregon Shipbuilding Corporation	Portland, Oregon	United States	For War Shipping Administration.
30 September	LST-449	Landing Ship, Tank	Kaiser Company	Vancouver, Washington	United States	For United States Navy.
30 September	Nathaniel Bacon	Liberty ship	Alabama Drydock and Shipbuilding Company	Mobile, Alabama	United States	For War Shipping Administration.
30 September	Samuel Heintzelman	Liberty ship	California Shipbuilding Corporation	Los Angeles, California	United States	For War Shipping Administration.

== October ==
Date	Ship	Class	Builder	Location	Country	Notes
2 October	Cyrus H. McCormick	Liberty ship	Permanente Metals Corporation	Richmond, California	United States	For War Shipping Administration.
2 October	Salmon P. Chase	Liberty ship	Oregon Shipbuilding Corporation	Portland, Oregon	United States	For War Shipping Administration.
4 October	James B. McPherson	Liberty ship	California Shipbuilding Corporation	Los Angeles, California	United States	For War Shipping Administration.
	LST-450	Landing Ship, Tank	Kaiser Company	Vancouver, Washington	United States	For United States Navy.
4 October	Nathaniel Alexander	Liberty ship	North Carolina Shipbuilding Company	Wilmington, North Carolina	United States	For War Shipping Administration.
4 October	VIC 23	VIC lighter	Richard Dunston Ltd.	Thorne	United Kingdom	For the Admiralty.
5 October	Stephen Girard	Liberty ship	Oregon Shipbuilding Corporation	Portland, Oregon	United States	For War Shipping Administration.
6 October	Herman Melville	Liberty ship	New England Shipbuilding Corporation	South Portland, Maine	United States	For War Shipping Administration.
6 October	Houston Volunteers	Liberty ship	Todd Houston Shipbuilding Corporation	Houston, Texas	United States	For War Shipping Administration.
6 October	LST-451	Landing Ship, Tank	Kaiser Company	Vancouver, Washington	United States	For United States Navy.
7 October	James B. Francis	Liberty ship	Permanente Metals Corporation	Richmond, California	United States	For War Shipping Administration.
7 October	John Sedgwick	Liberty ship	California Shipbuilding Corporation	Los Angeles, California	United States	For War Shipping Administration.
7 October	Pybus	Bogue-class escort carrier	Seattle-Tacoma Shipyard	Tacoma	United States	Converted C3 merchant freighter
7 October	William Cushing	Liberty ship	Permanente Metals Corporation	Richmond, California	United States	For War Shipping Administration.
8 October	Ascot	Cargo ship	Caledon Shipbuilding & Engineering Co. Ltd.	Dundee	United Kingdom	For Britain Steamship Co.
8 October	Henry Dearborn	Liberty ship	Oregon Shipbuilding Corporation	Portland, Oregon	United States	For War Shipping Administration.
8 October	John James Audubon	Liberty ship	Permanente Metals Corporation	Richmond, California	United States	For War Shipping Administration.
9 October	Joshua Seney	Liberty ship	Delta Shipbuilding	New Orleans, Louisiana	United States	For War Shipping Administration.
9 October	LST-401	Landing Ship, Tank	Bethlehem Fairfield Shipyard	Baltimore, Maryland	United States	For Royal Navy.
9 October	William Lloyd Garrison	Liberty ship	California Shipbuilding Corporation	Los Angeles, California	United States	For War Shipping Administration.
10 October	Cardinal Gibbons	Liberty ship	Bethlehem Fairfield Shipyard	Baltimore, Maryland	United States	For War Shipping Administration.
10 October	Dart	River-class frigate	Blyth Dry Docks & Shipbuilding Co. Ltd	Blyth, Northumberland	United Kingdom	For Royal Navy.
10 October	David Stone	Liberty ship	North Carolina Shipbuilding Company	Wilmington, North Carolina	United States	For War Shipping Administration.
10 October	Empire Clansman	Icemaid type collier	Grangemouth Dockyard Co. Ltd.	Grangemouth	United Kingdom	For Ministry of War Transport.
10 October	Grace Abbott	Liberty ship	Bethlehem Fairfield Shipyard	Baltimore, Maryland	United States	For War Shipping Administration.
10 October	LST-452	Landing Ship, Tank	Kaiser Company	Vancouver, Washington	United States	For United States Navy.
10 October	LST-453	Landing Ship, Tank	Kaiser Company	Vancouver, Washington	United States	For United States Navy.
10 October	Mutine	Algerine-class minesweeper	Harland & Wolff	Belfast	United Kingdom	For Royal Navy.
10 October	Thomas Scott	Liberty ship	Delta Shipbuilding	New Orleans, Louisiana	United States	For War Shipping Administration.
11 October	James B. Stephens	Liberty ship	Oregon Shipbuilding Corporation	Portland, Oregon	United States	For War Shipping Administration.
11 October	Smith Thompson	Liberty ship	California Shipbuilding Corporation	Los Angeles, California	United States	For War Shipping Administration.
12 October	Empire Faun	Coastal tanker	Goole Shipbuilding & Repairing Co. Ltd.	Goole	United Kingdom	For Ministry of War Transport.
12 October	Empire Harry	Larch-class tug	Goole Shipbuilding & Repairing Co. Ltd.	Goole	United Kingdom	For the Admiralty.
12 October	John Blair	Liberty ship	Permanente Metals Corporation	Richmond, California	United States	For War Shipping Administration.
13 October	Gabriel Duval	Liberty ship	California Shipbuilding Corporation	Los Angeles, California	United States	For War Shipping Administration.
13 October	Kite	Modified Black Swan-class sloop	Cammell Laird	Birkenhead	United Kingdom	
13 October	Naranio	Tanker	Blythswood Shipbuilding Co. Ltd.	Glasgow	United Kingdom	For Anglo-Saxon Petroleum Co. Ltd.
14 October	LST-454	Landing Ship, Tank	Kaiser Company	Vancouver, Washington	United States	For United States Navy.
14 October	Richard Jordan Gatling	Liberty ship	Permanente Metals Corporation	Richmond, California	United States	For War Shipping Administration.
14 October	Samuel Colt	Liberty ship	Oregon Shipbuilding Corporation	Portland, Oregon	United States	For War Shipping Administration.
14 October	Starling	Modified Black Swan-class sloop	Fairfield	Govan, Glasgow	United Kingdom	
14 October	Thomas Sinnickson	Liberty ship	Delta Shipbuilding	New Orleans, Louisiana	United States	For War Shipping Administration.
14 October	Wild Goose	Modified Black Swan-class sloop	Yarrow Shipbuilders	Scoutstoun, Glasgow	United Kingdom	
15 October	A. P. Hill	Liberty ship	Todd Houston Shipbuilding Corporation	Houston, Texas	United States	For War Shipping Administration.
15 October	James B. Richardson	Liberty ship	North Carolina Shipbuilding Company	Wilmington, North Carolina	United States	For War Shipping Administration.
15 October	Joseph Story	Liberty ship	California Shipbuilding Corporation	Los Angeles, California	United States	For War Shipping Administration.
16 October	Charles M. Hall	Liberty ship	Permanente Metals Corporation	Richmond, California	United States	For War Shipping Administration.
16 October	LST-401	Landing Ship, Tank	Bethlehem Fairfield Shipyard	Baltimore, Maryland	United States	For Royal Navy.
16 October	Tabitha Brown	Liberty ship	Oregon Shipbuilding Corporation	Portland, Oregon	United States	For War Shipping Administration.
16 October	William T. Coleman	Liberty ship	Marinship Corporation	Sausalito, California	United States	For United States Maritime Commission.
17 October	Empire Reaper	Severn type collier	J Harker Ltd.	Knottingley	United Kingdom	For Ministry of War Transport.
17 October	LST-455	Landing Ship, Tank	Kaiser Company	Vancouver, Washington	United States	For United States Navy.
17 October	Robert H. Harrison	Liberty ship	Permanente Metals Corporation	Richmond, California	United States	For War Shipping Administration.
18 October	Alexander Graham Bell	Liberty ship	Oregon Shipbuilding Corporation	Portland, Oregon	United States	For War Shipping Administration.
18 October	Baffins	Bogue-class escort carrier	Seattle-Tacoma Shipyard	Tacoma	United States	Converted C3 merchant freighter
18 October	Henry Baldwin	Liberty ship	California Shipbuilding Corporation	Los Angeles, California	United States	For War Shipping Administration.
18 October	John F. Appleby	Liberty ship	Permanente Metals Corporation	Richmond, California	United States	For War Shipping Administration.
18 October	Ocean Crusader	Ocean ship	Todd Shipyards Corporation	South Portland, Maine	United States	For Ministry of War Transport.
18 October	Ocean Glory	Ocean ship	Todd Shipyards Corporation	South Portland, Maine	United States	For Ministry of War Transport.
18 October	Ocean Gypsy	Ocean ship	Todd Shipyards Corporation	South Portland, Maine	United States	For Ministry of War Transport.
18 October	Princeton	Independence-class light aircraft carrier	New York Shipbuilding	New York City	United States	Converted cruiser hull
19 October	Israel Putman	Liberty ship	Alabama Drydock and Shipbuilding Company	Mobile, Alabama	United States	For War Shipping Administration.
20 October	George Westinghouse	Liberty ship	Permanente Metals Corporation	Richmond, California	United States	For War Shipping Administration.
20 October	Jonathan Sturges	Liberty ship	Delta Shipbuilding	New Orleans, Louisiana	United States	For War Shipping Administration.
20 October	LST-456	Landing Ship, Tank	Kaiser Company	Vancouver, Washington	United States	For United States Navy.
20 October	Paul Hamilton	Liberty ship	North Carolina Shipbuilding Company	Wilmington, North Carolina	United States	For War Shipping Administration.
20 October	Thomas A. Edison	Liberty ship	Oregon Shipbuilding Corporation	Portland, Oregon	United States	For War Shipping Administration.
21 October	Brockholst Livingston	Liberty ship	California Shipbuilding Corporation	Los Angeles, California	United States	For War Shipping Administration.
21 October	William King	Liberty ship	New England Shipbuilding Corporation	South Portland, Maine	United States	For War Shipping Administration.
23 October	Chyebassa	Cargo ship	Barclay, Curle & Co. Ltd.	Glasgow	United Kingdom	For British India Steam Navigation Company.
23 October	Harlesden	Cargo ship	William Doxford & Sons Ltd.	Pallion	United Kingdom	For J. & C. Harrison Ltd.
23 October	John Bartram	Liberty ship	Permanente Metals Corporation	Richmond, California	United States	For War Shipping Administration.
23 October	John Deere	Liberty ship	Oregon Shipbuilding Corporation	Portland, Oregon	United States	For War Shipping Administration.
23 October	John McLean	Liberty ship	Permanente Metals Corporation	Richmond, California	United States	For War Shipping Administration.
23 October	LST-457	Landing Ship, Tank	Kaiser Company	Vancouver, Washington	United States	For United States Navy.
23 October	Oakland	Atlanta-class light cruiser	Bethlehem Steel Company	San Francisco	United States	
24 October	Bruiser	Tank Landing Craft	Harland & Wolff	Belfast	United Kingdom	For Royal Navy.
24 October	Empire Record	Scandinavian type cargo ship	William Gray & Co. Ltd.	West Hartlepool	United Kingdom	For Ministry of War Transport.
24 October	Gear	Diver-class rescue and salvage ship	Basalt Rock Company	Napa, California	United States	
24 October	LST-403	Landing Ship, Tank	Bethlehem Fairfield Shipyard	Baltimore, Maryland	United States	For Royal Navy.
24 October	Thomas Johnson	Liberty ship	California Shipbuilding Corporation	Los Angeles, California	United States	For War Shipping Administration.
24 October	Thomas Sim Lee	Liberty ship	Bethlehem Fairfield Shipyard	Baltimore, Maryland	United States	For War Shipping Administration.
25 October	Charles Goodyear	Liberty ship	Oregon Shipbuilding Corporation	Portland, Oregon	United States	For War Shipping Administration.
25 October	Empire Seraph	Maple-type tug	Richard Dunston Ltd.	Thorne	United Kingdom	For the Admiralty.
25 October	Henry Middleton	Liberty ship	North Carolina Shipbuilding Company	Wilmington, North Carolina	United States	For War Shipping Administration.
26 October	LST-458	Landing Ship, Tank	Kaiser Company	Vancouver, Washington	United States	For United States Navy.
26 October	Philip P. Barbour	Liberty ship	California Shipbuilding Corporation	Los Angeles, California	United States	For War Shipping Administration.
27 October	Bonaventure	Cargo ship	Greenock Dockyard Co. Ltd.	Greenock	United Kingdom	For the Admiralty. Completed as HMS Bonaventure.
27 October	Elmer A. Sperry	Liberty ship	Oregon Shipbuilding Corporation	Portland, Oregon	United States	For War Shipping Administration.
27 October	G. H. Corliss	Liberty ship	Permanente Metals Corporation	Richmond, California	United States	For War Shipping Administration.
27 October	James Bowie	Liberty ship	Todd Houston Shipbuilding Corporation	Houston, Texas	United States	For War Shipping Administration.
27 October	Papanui	Refrigerated cargo liner	Alexander Stephen & Sons Ltd.	Linthouse	United Kingdom	For New Zealand Shipping Co. Ltd.
27 October	Richmond Mumford Pearson	Liberty ship	Delta Shipbuilding	New Orleans, Louisiana	United States	For War Shipping Administration.
28 October	Benjamin Smith	Liberty ship	North Carolina Shipbuilding Company	Wilmington, North Carolina	United States	For War Shipping Administration.
28 October	Coulgorm	Cargo ship	Lithgows Ltd.	Port Glasgow	United Kingdom	For Dornoch Shipping Co. Ltd.
28 October	LST-404	Landing Ship, Tank	Bethlehem Fairfield Shipyard	Baltimore, Maryland	United States	For Royal Navy.
28 October	LST-405	Landing Ship, Tank	Bethlehem Fairfield Shipyard	Baltimore, Maryland	United States	For Royal Navy.
28 October	LST-406	Landing Ship, Tank	Bethlehem Fairfield Shipyard	Baltimore, Maryland	United States	For Royal Navy.
28 October	Noah H. Swayne	Liberty ship	Permanente Metals Corporation	Richmond, California	United States	For War Shipping Administration.
28 October	Onyx	Algerine-class minesweeper	Harland & Wolff	Belfast	United Kingdom	For Royal Navy.
28 October	Peter V. Daniel	Liberty ship	California Shipbuilding Corporation	Los Angeles, California	United States	For War Shipping Administration.
28 October	Rocket	R-class destroyer	Scotts Shipbuilding	Greenock	United Kingdom	
29 October	Empire Torrent	Cargo ship	Harland & Wolff	Govan	United Kingdom	For Ministry of War Transport.
29 October	John P. Holland	Liberty ship	Oregon Shipbuilding Corporation	Portland, Oregon	United States	For War Shipping Administration.
29 October	LST-459	Landing Ship, Tank	Kaiser Company	Vancouver, Washington	United States	For United States Navy.
30 October	Richard March Hoe	Liberty ship	Permanente Metals Corporation	Richmond, California	United States	For War Shipping Administration.
30 October	Samuel Nelson	Liberty ship	California Shipbuilding Corporation	Los Angeles, California	United States	For War Shipping Administration.
31 October	Cotton Mather	Liberty ship	Bethlehem Fairfield Shipyard	Baltimore, Maryland	United States	For War Shipping Administration.
31 October	James Longstreet	Liberty ship	Todd Houston Shipbuilding Corporation	Houston, Texas	United States	For War Shipping Administration.
31 October	John Carver	Liberty ship	New England Shipbuilding Corporation	South Portland, Maine	United States	For War Shipping Administration.
date	Joseph Carver	Liberty ship	Alabama Drydock and Shipbuilding Company	Mobile, Alabama	United States	For War Shipping Administration.
31 October	LST-408	Landing Ship, Tank	Bethlehem Fairfield Shipyard	Baltimore, Maryland	United States	For Royal Navy.
31 October	LST-460	Landing Ship, Tank	Kaiser Company	Vancouver, Washington	United States	For United States Navy.
31 October	Robert C. Grier	Liberty ship	California Shipbuilding Corporation	Los Angeles, California	United States	For War Shipping Administration.
31 October	Samuel F. Miller	Liberty ship	Permanente Metals Corporation	Richmond, California	United States	For War Shipping Administration.
October	VIC 15	VIC lighter	Isaac Pimblott & Sons Ltd.	Northwich	United Kingdom	For the Admiralty.

== November ==
Date	Ship	Class	Builder	Location	Country	Notes
1 November	Collis P. Huntington	Liberty ship	North Carolina Shipbuilding Company	Wilmington, North Carolina	United States	For War Shipping Administration.
1 November	Edsall	Edsall-class destroyer escort	Consolidated Steel Corporation	Orange, Texas	United States	
1 November	S. M. Babcock	Liberty ship	Oregon Shipbuilding Corporation	Portland, Oregon	United States	For War Shipping Administration.
2 November	Elihu Thomson	Liberty ship	Permanente Metals Corporation	Richmond, California	United States	For War Shipping Administration.
3 November	Benjamin R. Curtis	Liberty ship	California Shipbuilding Corporation	Los Angeles, California	United States	For War Shipping Administration.
3 November	LST-461	Landing Ship, Tank	Kaiser Company	Vancouver, Washington	United States	For United States Navy.
4 November	Charles Gordon Curtis	Liberty ship	Oregon Shipbuilding Corporation	Portland, Oregon	United States	For War Shipping Administration.
4 November	George B. Selden	Liberty ship	Permanente Metals Corporation	Richmond, California	United States	For War Shipping Administration.
5 November	LST-407	Landing Ship, Tank	Bethlehem Fairfield Shipyard	Baltimore, Maryland	United States	For Royal Navy.
5 November	Marion McKinley Bovard	Liberty ship	California Shipbuilding Corporation	Los Angeles, California	United States	For War Shipping Administration.
5 November	VIC 24	VIC lighter	Richard Dunston Ltd.	Thorne	United Kingdom	For the Ministry of Supply.
6 November	Cornelius Harnett	Liberty ship	North Carolina Shipbuilding Company	Wilmington, North Carolina	United States	For War Shipping Administration.
6 November	David Davis	Liberty ship	Permanente Metals Corporation	Richmond, California	United States	For War Shipping Administration.
6 November	LST-462	Landing Ship, Tank	Kaiser Company	Vancouver, Washington	United States	For United States Navy.
6 November	Wade Hampton	Liberty ship	Delta Shipbuilding	New Orleans, Louisiana	United States	For War Shipping Administration.
7 November	John B. Floyd	Liberty ship	Permanente Metals Corporation	Richmond, California	United States	For War Shipping Administration.
7 November	Jonathan Trumball	Liberty ship	Delta Shipbuilding	New Orleans, Louisiana	United States	For War Shipping Administration.
7 November	Samuel Parker	Liberty ship	Oregon Shipbuilding Corporation	Portland, Oregon	United States	For War Shipping Administration.
7 November	William Eaton	Liberty ship	California Shipbuilding Corporation	Los Angeles, California	United States	For War Shipping Administration.
8 November	Will Rogers	Liberty ship	Bethlehem Fairfield Shipyard	Baltimore, Maryland	United States	For War Shipping Administration.
9 November	Bradford City	Cargo ship	William Doxford & Sons Ltd.	Pallion	United Kingdom	For Leeds Shipping Co. Ltd.
9 November	Crane	Modified Black Swan-class sloop			United Kingdom	
9 November	Empire Fortune	Cargo ship	John Readhead and Sons	South Shields	United Kingdom	For Ministry of War Transport
9 November	Empire Portia	Cargo ship	Swan, Hunter & Wigham Richardson Ltd.	Wallsend	United Kingdom	For Ministry of War Transport.
9 November	Essex Trader	Cargo ship	J. L. Thompson & Sons Ltd.	Sunderland	United Kingdom	For Trader Navigation Co. Ltd.
9 November	James B. Eads	Liberty ship	Oregon Shipbuilding Corporation	Portland, Oregon	United States	For War Shipping Administration.
9 November	LST-411	Landing Ship, Tank	Bethlehem Fairfield Shipyard	Baltimore, Maryland	United States	For Royal Navy.
6 November	LST-463	Landing Ship, Tank	Kaiser Company	Vancouver, Washington	United States	For United States Navy.
9 November	Stanlodge	Cargo ship	William Pickersgill & Co. Ltd.	Southwick	United Kingdom	For Stanhope Steamship Co. Ltd.
9 November	Stephen M. White	Liberty ship	California Shipbuilding Corporation	Los Angeles, California	United States	For War Shipping Administration.
10 November	Empire Cato	Cargo ship	William Gray & Co Ltd	West Hartlepool	United Kingdom	For Ministry of War Transport
10 November	Empire Homestead	Empire Lad-class coastal tanker	Rowhedge Ironworks Ltd	Rowhedge	United Kingdom	For Ministry of War Transport.
10 November	Empire Pioneer	Icemaid type collier	Ailsa Shipbuilding Co. Ltd.	Troon	United Kingdom	For Ministry of War Transport.
10 November	Empire Rosalind	Cargo ship	Burntisland Shipbuilding Company	Burntisland	United Kingdom	For Ministry of War Transport.
10 November	Empire Rupert	Larch-class tug	Goole Shipbuilding & Repairing Co. Ltd.	Goole	United Kingdom	For the Admiralty.
10 November	Hesper	Bustler-class tug	Henry Robb Ltd.	Leith	United Kingdom	For the Admiralty.
10 November	LST-413	Landing Ship, Tank	Bethlehem Fairfield Shipyard	Baltimore, Maryland	United States	For Royal Navy.
10 November	Morrison R. Waite	Liberty ship	Permanente Metals Corporation	Richmond, California	United States	For War Shipping Administration.
10 November	Nathaniel Bowditch	Liberty ship	Permanente Metals Corporation	Richmond, California	United States	For War Shipping Administration.
11 November	Bastian	Bogue-class escort carrier	Seattle-Tacoma Shipyard	Tacoma	United States	Converted C3 merchant freighter for Lend-Lease
11 November	Bolinas	Bogue-class escort carrier	Seattle-Tacoma Shipyard	Tacoma	United States	Converted C3 merchant freighter
11 November	Henry Bacon	Liberty ship	North Carolina Shipbuilding	Wilmington, North Carolina	United States	For War Shipping Administration.
11 November	Hubert Howe Bancroft	Liberty ship	California Shipbuilding Corporation	Los Angeles, California	United States	For War Shipping Administration.
11 November	Joseph Gale	Liberty ship	Oregon Shipbuilding Corporation	Portland, Oregon	United States	For War Shipping Administration.
11 November	Thomas J. Rusk	Liberty ship	Todd Houston Shipbuilding Corporation	Houston, Texas	United States	For War Shipping Administration.
11 November	William Kent	Liberty ship	Marinship Corporation	Sausalito, California	United States	For United States Maritime Commission.
11 November	William P. Fessenden	Liberty ship	New England Shipbuilding Corporation	South Portland, Maine	United States	For War Shipping Administration.
11 November	Winslow Homer	Liberty ship	New England Shipbuilding Corporation	South Portland, Maine	United States	For War Shipping Administration.
12 November	Daniel Chester French	Liberty ship	Bethlehem Fairfield Shipyard	Baltimore, Maryland	United States	For War Shipping Administration.
12 November	LST-464	Landing Ship, Tank	Kaiser Company	Vancouver, Washington	United States	For United States Navy.
12 November	Robert E. Peary	Liberty ship	Permanente Metals Corporation	Richmond, California	United States	For War Shipping Administration.
14 November	Charles M. Conrad	Liberty ship	Permanente Metals Corporation	Richmond, California	United States	For War Shipping Administration.
14 November	Lincoln Steffens	Liberty ship	California Shipbuilding Corporation	Los Angeles, California	United States	For War Shipping Administration.
14 November	Peter Skene Ogden	Liberty ship	Oregon Shipbuilding Corporation	Portland, Oregon	United States	For War Shipping Administration.
14 November	William Bradford	Liberty ship	New England Shipbuilding Corporation	South Portland, Maine	United States	For War Shipping Administration.
15 November	Abner Nash	Liberty ship	North Carolina Shipbuilding Company	Wilmington, North Carolina	United States	For War Shipping Administration.
15 November	LST-409	Landing Ship, Tank	Bethlehem Fairfield Shipyard	Baltimore, Maryland	United States	For Royal Navy.
15 November	LST-410	Landing Ship, Tank	Bethlehem Fairfield Shipyard	Baltimore, Maryland	United States	For Royal Navy.
15 November	Melville W. Fuller	Liberty ship	Permanente Metals Corporation	Richmond, California	United States	For War Shipping Administration.
16 November	James W. Marshall	Liberty ship	California Shipbuilding Corporation	Los Angeles, California	United States	For War Shipping Administration.
16 November	Joseph E. Johnston	Liberty ship	Todd Houston Shipbuilding Corporation	Houston, Texas	United States	For War Shipping Administration.
16 November	Joseph L. Meek	Liberty ship	Oregon Shipbuilding Corporation	Portland, Oregon	United States	For War Shipping Administration.
16 November	Lambert Cadwalader	Liberty ship	Todd Houston Shipbuilding Corporation	Houston, Texas	United States	For War Shipping Administration.
16 November	LST-412	Landing Ship, Tank	Bethlehem Fairfield Shipyard	Baltimore, Maryland	United States	For Royal Navy.
18 November	George Chaffey	Liberty ship	California Shipbuilding Corporation	Los Angeles, California	United States	For War Shipping Administration.
18 November	LST-466	Landing Ship, Tank	Kaiser Company	Vancouver, Washington	United States	For United States Navy.
18 November	Samuel L. Tilden	Liberty ship	Oregon Shipbuilding Corporation	Portland, Oregon	United States	For War Shipping Administration.
19 November	Empire Claymore	Cargo ship	Sir W G Armstrong, Whitworth & Co (Shipbuilders) Ltd	Newcastle upon Tyne	United Kingdom	For Ministry of War Transport
19 November	Empire Cobbett	Norwegian type tanker	Furness Shipbuilding Co. Ltd.	Haverton Hill-on-Tees	United Kingdom	For Ministry of War Transport.
20 November	Abner Doubleday	Liberty ship	Oregon Shipbuilding Corporation	Portland, Oregon	United States	For War Shipping Administration.
20 November	J. E. B. Stuart	Liberty ship	Todd Houston Shipbuilding Corporation	Houston, Texas	United States	For War Shipping Administration.
20 November	Joseph Alston	Liberty ship	North Carolina Shipbuilding Company	Wilmington, North Carolina	United States	For War Shipping Administration.
20 November	Joseph Holt	Liberty ship	Permanente Metals Corporation	Richmond, California	United States	For War Shipping Administration.
20 November	MOWT 8	Crane barge	Fleming & Ferguson Ltd.	Paisley	United Kingdom	For Ministry of War Transport.
20 November	Stanley Matthews	Liberty ship	Permanente Metals Corporation	Richmond, California	United States	For War Shipping Administration.
21 November	Darro	Refrigerated cargo ship	Harland & Wolff	Belfast	United Kingdom	For Royal Mail Line.
21 November	Empire Carpenter	Cargo ship	C Connell & Co Ltd	Scotstoun	United Kingdom	For Ministry of War Transport
21 November	Frank Joseph Irwin	Liberty ship	California Shipbuilding Corporation	Los Angeles, California	United States	For War Shipping Administration.
21 November	James Hoban	Liberty ship	Alabama Drydock and Shipbuilding Company	Mobile, Alabama	United States	For War Shipping Administration.
21 November	LST-414	Landing Ship, Tank	Bethlehem Fairfield Shipyard	Baltimore, Maryland	United States	For Royal Navy.
21 November	LST-467	Landing Ship, Tank	Kaiser Company	Vancouver, Washington	United States	For United States Navy.
22 November	Escape	Diver-class rescue and salvage ship	Basalt Rock Company	Napa, California	United States	
22 November	George W. Goethals	Liberty ship	Oregon Shipbuilding Corporation	Portland, Oregon	United States	For War Shipping Administration.
22 November	John Muir	Liberty ship	Marinship Corporation	Sausalito, California	United States	For United States Maritime Commission.
23 November	Betty Hindley	C-type coaster	S. P. Austin & Sons Ltd.	Sunderland	United Kingdom	For Stephenson, Clarke Ltd.
23 November	Bucklaw	Icemaid type collier	Grangemouth Dockyard Co. Ltd.	Grangemouth	United Kingdom	For G. Gibson & Co. Ltd.
23 November	Empire Oberon	Near-Warrior type tug	Henry Scarr Ltd	Hessle	United Kingdom	For Ministry of War Transport.
23 November	Helen Hunt Jackson	Liberty ship	California Shipbuilding Corporation	Los Angeles, California	United States	For War Shipping Administration.
23 November	John M. Schofield	Liberty ship	Permanente Metals Corporation	Richmond, California	United States	For War Shipping Administration.
23 November	John Vining	Liberty ship	Delta Shipbuilding	New Orleans, Louisiana	United States	For War Shipping Administration.
23 November	Stevenstone	Hunt-class destroyer	J. Samuel White	Cowes	United Kingdom	
23 November	Wearfield	Tanker	Sir James Laing & Sons Ltd.	Sunderland	United Kingdom	For Northern Petroleum Tank Steamship Co. Ltd.
24 November	Empire Benefit	Ocean type tanker	Harland & Wolff Ltd	Belfast	United Kingdom	For Ministry of War Transport.
24 November	LST-417	Landing Ship, Tank	Bethlehem Fairfield Shipyard	Baltimore, Maryland	United States	For Royal Navy.
24 November	LST-468	Landing Ship, Tank	Kaiser Company	Vancouver, Washington	United States	For United States Navy.
24 November	Paul Hamilton Hayne	Liberty ship	North Carolina Shipbuilding Company	Wilmington, North Carolina	United States	For War Shipping Administration.
24 November	Tweed	River-class frigate	Harland & Wolff	Govan	United Kingdom	For Royal Navy.
25 November	Abel Stearns	Liberty ship	California Shipbuilding Corporation	Los Angeles, California	United States	For War Shipping Administration.
25 November	Empire Charmian	Heavy lift ship	Vickers-Armstrongs Ltd	Barrow in Furness	United Kingdom	For Ministry of War Transport
25 November	William T. Sherman	Liberty ship	Oregon Shipbuilding Corporation	Portland, Oregon	United States	For War Shipping Administration.
26 November	Augustine Heard	Liberty ship	New England Shipbuilding Corporation	South Portland, Maine	United States	For War Shipping Administration.
26 November	Daniel J. Brewer	Liberty ship	Permanente Metals Corporation	Richmond, California	United States	For War Shipping Administration.
26 November	Daniel Willard	Liberty ship	Bethlehem Fairfield Shipyard	Baltimore, Maryland	United States	For War Shipping Administration.
26 November	Henry Wyndkoop	Liberty ship	Delta Shipbuilding	New Orleans, Louisiana	United States	For War Shipping Administration.
26 November	John Murray Forbes	Liberty ship	New England Shipbuilding Corporation	South Portland, Maine	United States	For War Shipping Administration.
26 November	Julia Ward Howe	Liberty ship	New England Shipbuilding Corporation	South Portland, Maine	United States	For War Shipping Administration.
26 November	Lyman Beecher	Liberty ship	Marinship Corporation	Sausalito, California	United States	For United States Maritime Commission.
26 November	Triona	Cargo ship	Lithgows Ltd.	Port Glasgow	United Kingdom	For British Phosphate Commissioners.
26 November	Woodcock	Modified Black Swan-class sloop			United Kingdom	
27 November	Benjamin Ide Wheeler	Liberty ship	California Shipbuilding Corporation	Los Angeles, California	United States	For War Shipping Administration.
27 November	John A. Rawlins	Liberty ship	Permanente Metals Corporation	Richmond, California	United States	For War Shipping Administration.
27 November	LST-469	Landing Ship, Tank	Kaiser Company	Vancouver, Washington	United States	For United States Navy.
27 November	Marshall Elliott	Liberty ship	North Carolina Shipbuilding Company	Wilmington, North Carolina	United States	For War Shipping Administration.
27 November	William Coddington	Liberty ship	Walsh-Kaiser Company	Providence, Rhode Island	United States	For War Shipping Administration.
28 November	Amos G. Throop	Liberty ship	California Shipbuilding Corporation	Los Angeles, California	United States	For War Shipping Administration.
28 November	Frank B. Kellogg	Liberty ship	Oregon Shipbuilding Corporation	Portland, Oregon	United States	For War Shipping Administration.
28 November	George W. McCrary	Liberty ship	Permanente Metals Corporation	Richmond, California	United States	For War Shipping Administration.
28 November	Thaddeus Kosciuszko	Liberty ship	Bethlehem Fairfield Shipyard	Baltimore, Maryland	United States	For War Shipping Administration.
29 November	Empire Prospero	Cargo ship	Bartram & Sons Ltd	Sunderland	United Kingdom	For Ministry of War Transport.
29 November	James Iredell	Liberty ship	North Carolina Shipbuilding Company	Wilmington, North Carolina	United States	For War Shipping Administration.
29 November	Pierre LaClede	Liberty ship	Permanente Metals Corporation	Richmond, California	United States	For War Shipping Administration.
30 November	Carls Schurz	Liberty ship	Oregon Shipbuilding Corporation	Portland, Oregon	United States	For War Shipping Administration.
30 November	Clark Mills	Liberty ship	Alabama Drydock and Shipbuilding Company	Mobile, Alabama	United States	For War Shipping Administration.
30 November	LST-416	Landing Ship, Tank	Bethlehem Fairfield Shipyard	Baltimore, Maryland	United States	For Royal Navy.
30 November	LST-418	Landing Ship, Tank	Bethlehem Fairfield Shipyard	Baltimore, Maryland	United States	For Royal Navy.
30 November	LST-470	Landing Ship, Tank	Kaiser Company	Vancouver, Washington	United States	For United States Navy.

== December ==
Date	Ship	Class	Builder	Location	Country	Notes
1 December	Alexander Ramsey	Liberty ship	Permanente Metals Corporation	Richmond, California	United States	For War Shipping Administration.
1 December	Penelope Barker	Liberty ship	North Carolina Shipbuilding Company	Wilmington, North Carolina	United States	For War Shipping Administration.
1 December	William Mulholland	Liberty ship	California Shipbuilding Corporation	Los Angeles, California	United States	For War Shipping Administration.
2 December	Henry Barnard	Liberty ship	Oregon Shipbuilding Corporation	Portland, Oregon	United States	For War Shipping Administration.
2 December	John B. Hood	Liberty ship	Todd Houston Shipbuilding Corporation	Houston, Texas	United States	For War Shipping Administration.
3 December	Cootamundra	Bathurst-class corvette	Poole & Steel	Sydney	Australia	
3 December	LST-471	Landing Ship, Tank	Kaiser Company	Vancouver, Washington	United States	For United States Navy.
3 December	Samuel Jordan Kirkwood	Liberty ship	Delta Shipbuilding	New Orleans, Louisiana	United States	For War Shipping Administration.
4 December	Gaspar De Portola	Liberty ship	California Shipbuilding Corporation	Los Angeles, California	United States	For War Shipping Administration.
5 December	John S. Copley	Liberty ship	Oregon Shipbuilding Corporation	Portland, Oregon	United States	For War Shipping Administration.
5 December	LST-420	Landing Ship, Tank	Bethlehem Fairfield Shipyard	Baltimore, Maryland	United States	For Royal Navy.
5 December	LST-421	Landing Ship, Tank	Bethlehem Fairfield Shipyard	Baltimore, Maryland	United States	For Royal Navy.
6 December	Alexander Lillington	Liberty ship	North Carolina Shipbuilding Company	Wilmington, North Carolina	United States	For War Shipping Administration.
6 December	Belleau Wood	Independence-class light aircraft carrier	New York Shipbuilding	New York City	United States	Converted cruiser hull
6 December	Empire Rosa	Tug	Blyth Dry Docks & Shipbuilding Co Ltd	Blyth	United Kingdom	For Ministry of War Transport
6 December	Frederic Remington	Liberty ship	Permanente Metals Corporation	Richmond, California	United States	For War Shipping Administration.
7 December	Alexander White	Liberty ship	Delta Shipbuilding	New Orleans, Louisiana	United States	For War Shipping Administration.
7 December	Ballinderry	River-class frigate	Blyth Dry Docks & Shipbuilding Co. Ltd	Blyth, Northumberland	United Kingdom	For Royal Navy.
7 December	Bunker Hill	Essex-class aircraft carrier	Bethlehem Steel Company	Quincy, Massachusetts	United States	
7 December	Charles Willson Peale	Liberty ship	Oregon Shipbuilding Corporation	Portland, Oregon	United States	For War Shipping Administration.
7 December	George Handley	Liberty ship	Southeastern Shipbuilding Corporation	Savannah, Georgia	United States	For War Shipping Administration.
7 December	LST-472	Landing Ship, Tank	Kaiser Company	Vancouver, Washington	United States	For United States Navy.
7 December	New Jersey	Iowa-class battleship	Philadelphia Navy Yard	Philadelphia	United States	
7 December	Pearl Harbor	Liberty ship	Bethlehem Fairfield Shipyard	Baltimore, Maryland	United States	For War Shipping Administration.
7 December	Robert T. Lincoln	Liberty ship	Permanente Metals Corporation	Richmond, California	United States	For War Shipping Administration.
7 December	Philip Kearny	Liberty ship	Marinship Corporation	Sausalito, California	United States	For United States Maritime Commission.
7 December	Sebastian Viscaino	Liberty ship	California Shipbuilding Corporation	Los Angeles, California	United States	For War Shipping Administration.
8 December	Empire Lanter	Cargo ship	Hong Kong & Whampoa Dock Co. Ltd.	Hong Kong	(Empire of Japan) Hong Kong	For Japanese Government. Completed at Gyoku Maru.
8 December	Miami	Cleveland-class light cruiser	William Cramp & Sons	Philadelphia	United States	
8 December	Empire Bardolph	Refrigerated cargo ship	Short Brothers Ltd.	Sunderland	United Kingdom	For Ministry of War Transport
8 December	Empire Candida	Scandinavian type cargo ship	William Gray & Co. Ltd.	West Hartlepool	United Kingdom	For Ministry of War Transport.
8 December	William Brewster	Liberty ship	New England Shipbuilding Corporation	South Portland, Maine	United States	For War Shipping Administration.
9 December	Edwin Booth	Liberty ship	Oregon Shipbuilding Corporation	Portland, Oregon	United States	For War Shipping Administration.
9 December	Fireguard	Icemaid type collier	Grangemouth Dockyard Co. Ltd.	Grangemouth	United Kingdom	For Gas, Light & Coke Co. Ltd.
9 December	John Holt	Cargo ship	Cammell Laird & Co. Ltd.	Birkenhead	United Kingdom	For John Holt Ltd.
9 December	LST-473	Landing Ship, Tank	Kaiser Company	Vancouver, Washington	United States	For United States Navy.
9 December	Luis Arguello	Liberty ship	California Shipbuilding Corporation	Los Angeles, California	United States	For War Shipping Administration.
9 December	Rattler	Algerine-class minesweeper	Harland & Wolff	Belfast	United Kingdom	For Royal Navy.
9 December	William C. Endicott	Liberty ship	Permanente Metals Corporation	Richmond, California	United States	For War Shipping Administration.
10 December	LST-422	Landing Ship, Tank	Bethlehem Fairfield Shipyard	Baltimore, Maryland	United States	For Royal Navy.
10 December	Richard Caswell	Liberty ship	North Carolina Shipbuilding Company	Wilmington, North Carolina	United States	For War Shipping Administration.
10 December	Roebuck	R-class destroyer	Scotts Shipbuilding	Greenock	United Kingdom	
10 December	Walter Colton	Liberty ship	Permanente Metals Corporation	Richmond, California	United States	For War Shipping Administration.
11 December	Joseph Jefferson	Liberty ship	Oregon Shipbuilding Corporation	Portland, Oregon	United States	For War Shipping Administration.
11 December	LST-426	Landing Ship, Tank	Bethlehem Fairfield Shipyard	Baltimore, Maryland	United States	For Royal Navy.
11 December	Pegu	Cargo ship	William Denny and Brothers Ltd.	Dumbarton	United Kingdom	For British & Burmese Steam Navigation Co. Ltd.
11 December	Pheasant	Modified Black Swan-class sloop	Yarrow Shipbuilders	Scoutstoun, Glasgow	United Kingdom	
12 December	Abraham Lincoln	Liberty ship	Delta Shipbuilding	New Orleans, Louisiana	United States	For War Shipping Administration.
12 December	Archbishop Lamy	Liberty ship	California Shipbuilding Corporation	Los Angeles, California	United States	For War Shipping Administration.
12 December	Big Foot Wallace	Liberty ship	Todd Houston Shipbuilding Corporation	Houston, Texas	United States	For War Shipping Administration.
12 December	Boxer	Tank Landing Craft	Harland & Wolff	Belfast	United Kingdom	For Royal Navy.
12 December	LST-424	Landing Ship, Tank	Bethlehem Fairfield Shipyard	Baltimore, Maryland	United States	For Royal Navy.
12 December	LST-425	Landing Ship, Tank	Bethlehem Fairfield Shipyard	Baltimore, Maryland	United States	For Royal Navy.
12 December	LST-474	Landing Ship, Tank	Kaiser Company	Vancouver, Washington	United States	For United States Navy.
12 December	Redfield Proctor	Liberty ship	Permanente Metals Corporation	Richmond, California	United States	For War Shipping Administration.
13 December	King S. Woolsey	Liberty ship	California Shipbuilding Corporation	Los Angeles, California	United States	For War Shipping Administration.
13 December	Pocahontas	Liberty ship	North Carolina Shipbuilding Company	Wilmington, North Carolina	United States	For War Shipping Administration.
13 December	Richard Mansfield	Liberty ship	Oregon Shipbuilding Corporation	Portland, Oregon	United States	For War Shipping Administration.
14 December	David Gaillard	Liberty ship	Permanente Metals Corporation	Richmond, California	United States	For War Shipping Administration.
14 December	Mayo Brothers	Liberty ship	Delta Shipbuilding	New Orleans, Louisiana	United States	For War Shipping Administration.
15 December	Benjamin H. Latrobe	Liberty ship	Alabama Drydock and Shipbuilding Company	Mobile, Alabama	United States	For War Shipping Administration.
15 December	John Burke	Liberty ship	Oregon Shipbuilding Corporation	Portland, Oregon	United States	For War Shipping Administration.
15 December	J. Sterling Morton	Liberty ship	Permanente Metals Corporation	Richmond, California	United States	For War Shipping Administration.
16 December	LST-475	Landing Ship, Tank	Kaiser Company	Vancouver, Washington	United States	For United States Navy.
17 December	Henry J. Raymond	Liberty ship	Permanente Metals Corporation	Richmond, California	United States	For War Shipping Administration.
17 December	Jim Bridger	Liberty ship	Oregon Shipbuilding Corporation	Portland, Oregon	United States	For War Shipping Administration.
17 December	Louis McLane	Liberty ship	California Shipbuilding Corporation	Los Angeles, California	United States	For War Shipping Administration.
17 December	Windsor Queen	Cargo ship	Burntisland Shipbuilding Company	Burntisland	United Kingdom	For British Channel Islands Shipping Co. Ltd.
18 December	Amelia Earhart	Liberty ship	Todd Houston Shipbuilding Corporation	Houston, Texas	United States	For War Shipping Administration.
18 December	Christopher Gadsden	Liberty ship	North Carolina Shipbuilding Company	Wilmington, North Carolina	United States	For War Shipping Administration.
18 December	Empire Brutus	Cargo ship	J. L. Thompson & Sons Ltd.	Sunderland	United Kingdom	For Ministry of War Transport
19 December	Diver	Diver-class rescue and salvage ship	Basalt Rock Company	Napa, California	United States	
19 December	Ezra Meeker	Liberty ship	Oregon Shipbuilding Corporation	Portland, Oregon	United States	For War Shipping Administration.
19 December	George H. Dern	Liberty ship	Permanente Metals Corporation	Richmond, California	United States	For War Shipping Administration.
19 December	John Bidwell	Liberty ship	California Shipbuilding Corporation	Los Angeles, California	United States	For War Shipping Administration.
19 December	Lord Delaware	Liberty ship	Bethlehem Fairfield Shipyard	Baltimore, Maryland	United States	For War Shipping Administration.
19 December	LST-427	Landing Ship, Tank	Bethlehem Fairfield Shipyard	Baltimore, Maryland	United States	For Royal Navy.
20 December	Jersey Hart	Cargo ship	William Doxford & Sons Ltd.	Pallion	United Kingdom	For Nolisement Steamship Co. Ltd.
20 December	Thomas Hart Benton	Liberty ship	Marinship Corporation	Sausalito, California	United States	For United States Maritime Commission.
20 December	William G. McAdoo	Liberty ship	Permanente Metals Corporation	Richmond, California	United States	For War Shipping Administration.
21 December	British Vigour	Tanker	Furness Shipbuilding Co. Ltd.	Haverton Hill-on-Tees	United Kingdom	For British Tanker Co. Ltd.
21 December	Cape Howe	Cargo ship	Lithgows Ltd.	Port Glasgow	United Kingdom	For Cape of Good Hope Motorship Co Ltd.
21 December	James Madison	Liberty ship	Todd Houston Shipbuilding Corporation	Houston, Texas	United States	For War Shipping Administration.
21 December	Narbada	Black Swan-class sloop	John I. Thornycroft & Company		United Kingdom	
21 December	Empire Courage	Cargo ship	Barclay Curle	Glasgow	United Kingdom	For Ministry of War Transport
21 December	Empire Titania	Modified Warrior-type tug	Scott & Sons Ltd.	Bowling	United Kingdom	For Ministry of War Transport.
21 December	Norman Monarch	Cargo ship	Caledon Shipbuilding & Engineering Co. Ltd.	Dundee	United Kingdom	For Monarch Steamship Co. Ltd.
22 December	Airsprite	Sprite-class tanker	Blythswood Shipbuilding Co. Ltd.	Glasgow	United Kingdom	For Royal Fleet Auxiliary.
22 December	Betty Zane	Liberty ship	North Carolina Shipbuilding Company	Wilmington, North Carolina	United States	For War Shipping Administration.
22 December	Empire Ben	Near-Warrior type tug	J. S. Watson Ltd.	Gainsborough	United Kingdom	For Ministry of War Transport.
22 December	Empire Sandy	Larch-class tug	Clelands (Successors) Ltd.	Wallsend	United Kingdom	For the Admiralty.
22 December	English Prince	Cargo ship	William Doxford & Sons Ltd.	Pallion	United Kingdom	For Prince Line Ltd.
22 December	Hugh S. Legare	Liberty ship	California Shipbuilding Corporation	Los Angeles, California	United States	For War Shipping Administration.
22 December	Key Pittman	Liberty ship	Permanente Metals Corporation	Richmond, California	United States	For War Shipping Administration.
22 December	Leslie M. Shaw	Liberty ship	Permanente Metals Corporation	Richmond, California	United States	For War Shipping Administration.
22 December	LST-428	Landing Ship, Tank	Bethlehem Fairfield Shipyard	Baltimore, Maryland	United States	For Royal Navy.
22 December	LST-430	Landing Ship, Tank	Bethlehem Fairfield Shipyard	Baltimore, Maryland	United States	For Royal Navy.
22 December	Sacajawea	Liberty ship	Oregon Shipbuilding Corporation	Portland, Oregon	United States	For War Shipping Administration.
23 December	David G. Farragut	Liberty ship	Delta Shipbuilding	New Orleans, Louisiana	United States	For War Shipping Administration.
23 December	Empire Commerce	Intermediate type tanker	Sir J. Laing & Sons Ltd.	Sunderland	United Kingdom	For Ministry of War Transport.
23 December	Empire MacAlpine	MAC ship	Burntisland Shipbuilding Co. Ltd.	Burntisland	United Kingdom	For Ministry of War Transport.
23 December	Empire Mortimer	Cargo ship	William Gray & Co. Ltd.	West Hartlepool	United Kingdom	For Ministry of War Transport.
23 December	Empire Nerissa	Cargo ship	Harland & Wolff	Belfast	United Kingdom	For Ministry of War Transport.
23 December	James Buchanan	Liberty ship	California Shipbuilding Corporation	Los Angeles, California	United States	For War Shipping Administration.
23 December	Reno	Atlanta-class light cruiser	Bethlehem Steel Company	San Francisco	United States	
23 December	Rowallan Castle	Refrigerated cargo ship	Harland & Wolff	Belfast	United Kingdom	For Union-Castle Line.
24 December	Chief Washakie	Liberty ship	Oregon Shipbuilding Corporation	Portland, Oregon	United States	For War Shipping Administration.
24 December	James J. Pettigrew	Liberty ship	North Carolina Shipbuilding Company	Wilmington, North Carolina	United States	For War Shipping Administration.
24 December	Pat Harrison	Liberty ship	Delta Shipbuilding	New Orleans, Louisiana	United States	For War Shipping Administration.
26 December	Empire Fay	Coastal tanker	A. & J. Inglis Ltd.	Glasgow	United Kingdom	For Ministry of War Transport.
26 December	George B. Cortelyou	Liberty ship	Permanente Metals Corporation	Richmond, California	United States	For War Shipping Administration.
27 December	Anne Bradstreet	Liberty ship	New England Shipbuilding Corporation	South Portland, Maine	United States	For War Shipping Administration.
27 December	Daniel H. Hill	Liberty ship	North Carolina Shipbuilding Company	Wilmington, North Carolina	United States	For War Shipping Administration.
28 December	James Jackson	Liberty ship	Southeastern Shipbuilding Corporation	Savannah, Georgia	United States	For War Shipping Administration.
27 December	John M. Clayton	Liberty ship	California Shipbuilding Corporation	Los Angeles, California	United States	For War Shipping Administration.
27 December	William E. Borah	Liberty ship	Oregon Shipbuilding Corporation	Portland, Oregon	United States	For War Shipping Administration.
28 December	Chief Ouray	Liberty ship	Permanente Metals Corporation	Richmond, California	United States	For War Shipping Administration.
28 December	Empire Treasure	Cargo ship	Lithgows Ltd.	Port Glasgow	United Kingdom	For Ministry of War Transport.
28 December	Frederick Jackson Turner	Liberty ship	Permanente Metals Corporation	Richmond, California	United States	For War Shipping Administration.
28 December	M. M. Guhin	Liberty ship	Oregon Shipbuilding Corporation	Portland, Oregon	United States	For War Shipping Administration.
28 December	Staten Island	Wind-class icebreaker	Western Pipe and Steel Company	San Pedro, California	United States	For Lend-Lease
28 December	Willard Hall	Liberty ship	Bethlehem Fairfield Shipyard	Baltimore, Maryland	United States	For War Shipping Administration.
28 December	William L. Marcy	Liberty ship	California Shipbuilding Corporation	Los Angeles, California	United States	For War Shipping Administration.
28 December	Woodbridge N. Ferris	Liberty ship	Bethlehem Fairfield Shipyard	Baltimore, Maryland	United States	For War Shipping Administration.
29 December	Empire Laird	Severn type collier	Richard Dunston Ltd.	Thorne	United Kingdom	For Ministry of War Transport.
29 December	Lewis Cass	Liberty ship	California Shipbuilding Corporation	Los Angeles, California	United States	For War Shipping Administration.
30 December	Carnegie	Bogue-class escort carrier	Seattle-Tacoma Shipyard	Tacoma	United States	Converted C3 merchant freighter for Lend-Lease
30 December	Champ Clark	Liberty ship	Todd Houston Shipbuilding Corporation	Houston, Texas	United States	For War Shipping Administration.
30 December	E. Kirby Smith	Liberty ship	J. A. Jones Construction Company	Panama City, Florida	United States	For War Shipping Administration.
30 December	George Davis	Liberty ship	North Carolina Shipbuilding Company	Wilmington, North Carolina	United States	For War Shipping Administration.
30 December	Jeremiah S. Black	Liberty ship	California Shipbuilding Corporation	Los Angeles, California	United States	For War Shipping Administration.
31 December	Colin P. Kelly Jr.	Liberty ship	Alabama Drydock and Shipbuilding Company	Mobile, Alabama	United States	For War Shipping Administration.
31 December	Elihu B. Washburne	Liberty ship	California Shipbuilding Corporation	Los Angeles, California	United States	For War Shipping Administration.
31 December	Empire Demon	Near-Warrior type tug	John Crown & Sons Ltd.	Sunderland	United Kingdom	For Ministry of War Transport.
31 December	George S. Boutwell	Liberty ship	Permanente Metals Corporation	Richmond, California	United States	For War Shipping Administration.
31 December	Grapple	Diver-class rescue and salvage ship	Basalt Rock Company	Napa, California	United States	
31 December	Joseph G. Cannon	Liberty ship	Permanente Metals Corporation	Richmond, California	United States	For War Shipping Administration.
31 December	Lindley M. Garrison	Liberty ship	Oregon Shipbuilding Corporation	Portland, Oregon	United States	For War Shipping Administration.
31 December	Simon Willard	Liberty ship	Alabama Drydock and Shipbuilding Company	Mobile, Alabama	United States	For War Shipping Administration.
December	John T. Walsh	Tug	Alabama Drydock and Shipbuilding Company	Mobile, Alabama	United States	For Mobile Towing.

== Unknown date ==
Date	Ship	Class	Builder	Location	Country	Notes
Unknown date	Barnsdale H.	Motor barge	J. Harker Ltd.	Knottingley	United Kingdom	For J. Harker Ltd.
Unknown date	Bishops Terrier	Lighter	W. J. Yarwood & Sons Ltd.	Northwich	United Kingdom	For Liverpool Lighterage Co. Ltd. and/or Bishops Wharf Carrying Co. Ltd.
Unknown date	Boelke	Karl Meyer-class seaplane tender	Norderwerft Koser und Meyer	Hamburg	Germany	For the Luftwaffe
Unknown date	Danisch Wold	Coastal tanker				
Unknown date	Empire Blossom	Cargo ship	Taikoo Dockyard & Engineering Company of Hong Kong Ltd	Hong Kong	(Empire of Japan) Hong Kong	For the Imperial Japanese Navy
Unknown date	Flandern	Whaler	Akers Mekaniske Verksted	Oslo	Norway	Requisitioned by the Kriegsmarine on completion
Unknown date	Flemhude	Coastal tanker	Elsflether Werft AG	Elsfleth	Germany	For the Kriegsmarine.
Unknown date	Grete	Coastal tanker	D W Kremer Sohn	Elmshorn	Germany	For the Kriegsmarine
Unknown date	Gyoten Maru	Cargo ship	Hong Kong & Whampoa Dock Co. Ltd.	Hong Kong	(Empire of Japan) Hong Kong	For Japanese Government.
Unknown date	Helgoland	Whaler	Akers Mekaniske Verksted	Oslo	Norway	Requisitioned by the Kriegsmarine on completion
Unknown date	Hilde	Coastal tanker			Germany	For the Kriegsmarine.
Unknown date	James Oglethorpe	Liberty ship	Southeastern Shipbuilding Corporation	Savannah, Georgia	United States	For War Shipping Administration.
Unknown date	Karin K. Bornhofen	Cargo ship	Nakskov Skibs Akt.	Nakskov	Denmark	For R. Bornhofen.
Unknown date	Marsteinen	Coastal tanker	Sarpsborg Mekaniske Verksted	Sarpsborg	Norway	Requisitioned by the Kriegsmarine on completion
Unknown date	MGB 622	Fairmile D motor gun boat	Brooke Marine Ltd.	Lowestoft	United Kingdom	For Royal Navy.
Unknown date	MFV-21	Naval Motor Fishing Vessel	Anderson, Rigden & Perkins Ltd.	Whitstable	United Kingdom	For Royal Navy.
Unknown date	MMS 58	MMS-class minesweeper	J. Bolson & Son Ltd.	Poole	United Kingdom	For Royal Navy.
Unknown date	MMS 202	MMS-class minesweeper	J. Bolson & Son Ltd.	Poole	United Kingdom	For Royal Navy.
Unknown date	MOWT 1	Crane barge	Fairfield Shipbuilding and Engineering Co. Ltd.	Chepstow	United Kingdom	For Ministry of War Transport.
Unknown date	MOWT 2	Crane barge	Fairfield Shipbuilding and Engineering Co. Ltd.	Chepstow	United Kingdom	For Ministry of War Transport.
Unknown date	MOWT 3	Crane barge	Fairfield Shipbuilding and Engineering Co. Ltd.	Chepstow	United Kingdom	For Ministry of War Transport.
Unknown date	MOWT 5	Crane barge	Fairfield Shipbuilding and Engineering Co. Ltd.	Chepstow	United Kingdom	For Ministry of War Transport.
Unknown date	Pinklake	Tug	Richard Dunston Ltd.	Thorne	United Kingdom	For River Lighterage Co. Ltd.
Unknown date	Richard Walsh	Tug	Alabama Drydock and Shipbuilding Company	Mobile, Alabama	United States	For Mobile Towing.
Unknown date	VIC 18	VIC lighter	J. Hay & Sons Ltd.	Kirkintilloch	United Kingdom	For the Admiralty.
Unknown date	Vipya	Ferry	A. & J. Inglis Ltd.	Glasgow	United Kingdom	For Nyasaland Railways.
Unknown date	Unnamed	Steamship	Bathurst & Co	Tewkesbury	United Kingdom	For Admiralty.
