= George Calvert (disambiguation) =

George Calvert, 1st Baron Baltimore (1579–1632) was the proprietary governor of Newfoundland and founder of the Province of Maryland.

George Calvert may also refer to:

== People ==
- George Henry Calvert (1803–1889), American writer, editor, essayist
- George Calvert (planter) (1768–1838), planter in Maryland
- George Calvert (bishop) (1900–1976), bishop of Calgary in the Anglican Church of Canada
- George Calvert (surgeon) (1795–1825), British surgeon

== Other uses ==
- SS George Calvert, the name of several ships
