= SS George Calvert =

There were at least two Liberty ships named George Calvert

- USAS American Mariner, Maritime Commission hull number 20, launched in 1941 as SS George Calvert, but renamed almost immediately. Best known as a missile range ship in the 1960s, she served under various prefixes: TS, USAS, USAF, USNS.
- SS George Calvert (1942), Maritime Commission hull number 29, launched in 1942 and sunk off Cuba in 1942 by the German submarine U-753.
