= List of Victory ships (H) =

This is a list of Victory ships with names beginning with H.

== Description ==
A Victory ship was a cargo ship. The cargo ships were 455 feet 3 inches (138.76 m) overall, 436 feet 6 inches (133.05 m) between perpendiculars They had a beam of 62 feet 0 inches (18.90 m), a depth of 38 feet 0 inches (11.58 m) and a draught of 28 feet 0 inches (8.53 m). They were assessed at 7,612 GRT, 4,555 NRT and 10,750 DWT.

The ships were powered by a triple expansion steam engine, driving a steam turbine via double reduction gear. This gave the ship a speed of 15.5 knots (28.7 km/h) or 16.5 knots (30.6 km/h), depending on the machinery installed.

Liberty ships had five holds. No. 1 hold was 57 feet 6 inches (17.53 m) long, with a capacity of 81,715 cubic feet (2,313.9 m^{3}), No. 2 hold was 45 feet 0 inches (13.72 m) long, with a capacity of 89,370 cubic feet (2,531 m^{3}), No. 3 hold was 78 feet 0 inches (23.77 m) long, with a capacity of 158,000 cubic feet (4,500 m^{3}), No. 4 hold was 81 feet 0 inches (24.69 m) long, with a capacity of 89,370 cubic feet (2,531 m^{3}) and No. 5 hold was 75 feet 0 inches (22.86 m) long, with a capacity of 81,575 cubic feet (2,309.9 m^{3}).

In wartime service, they carried a crew of 62, plus 28 gunners. The ships carried four lifeboats. Two were powered, with a capacity of 27 people and two were unpowered, with a capacity of 29 people.

== Hagerstown Victory ==
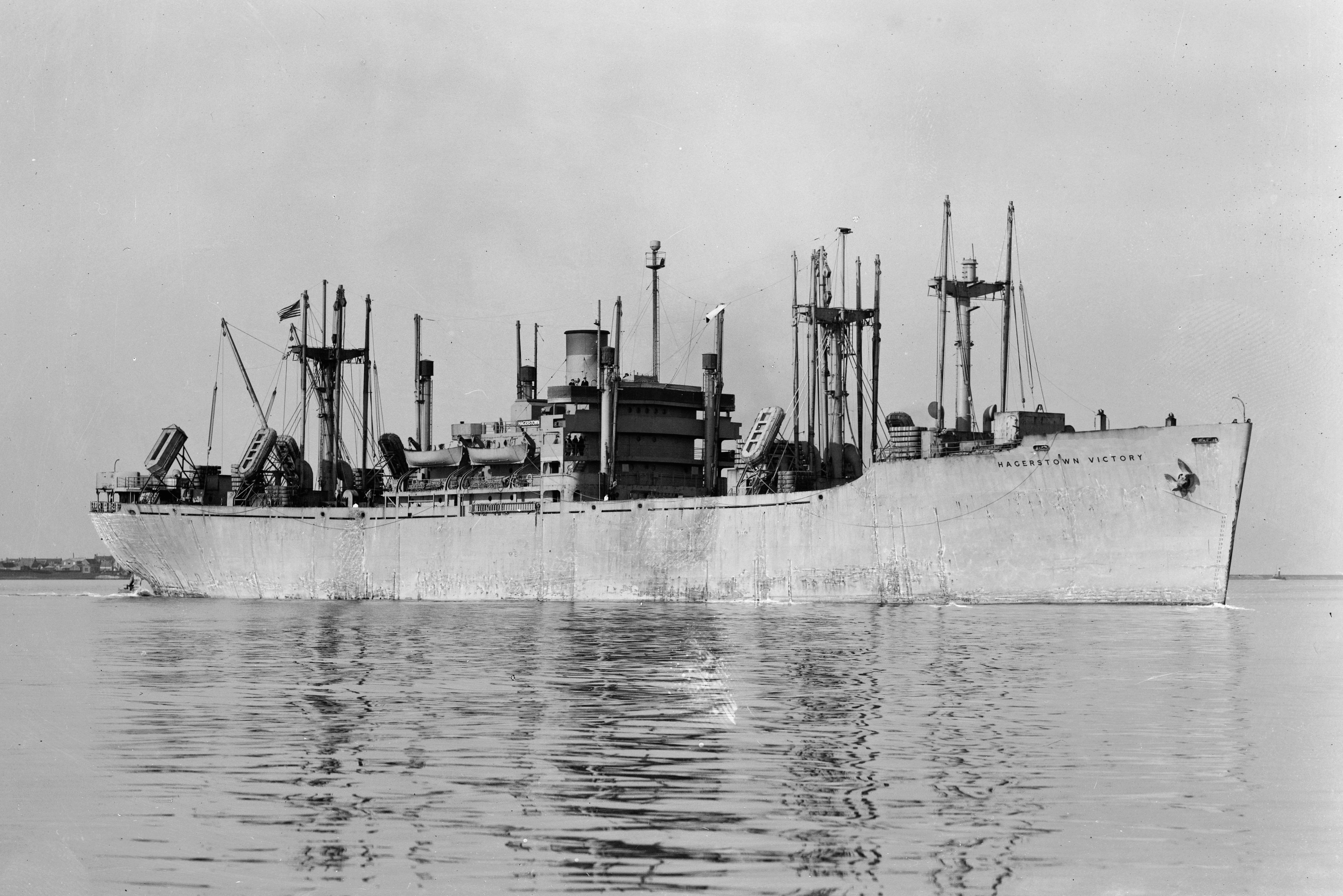
Hagerstown Victory

Hagerstown Victory was a troop transport built by Bethlehem Fairfield Shipyard, Baltimore, Maryland. Her keel was laid on 13 December 1944. She was launched on 13 February 1945 and delivered on 13 March. Built for the War Shipping Administration (WSA), she was operated under the management of Calmar Steamship Company. Laid up in the James River in 1946. To Oceanic Ore Carriers in 1967 in exchange for Type C2 ship Oceanic Cloud under the Ship Exchange Act. Chartered to the Military Sea Transportation Service (MSTS) and renamed Chatham. Sold at auction on 23 May 1969 by United States Marshals Service. Buyers were Windjammer Shipping Inc., Wilmington, Delaware and renamed Windjammer Janeen. Sold in 1970 to Trans World Shipping, Panama and renamed Julep. She sank in a typhoon between the Philippines and Taiwan (17°30′N 119°10′E) on 20 November 1970 whilst on a voyage from Coondapoor, India to a Japanese port.

== Haiti Victory ==
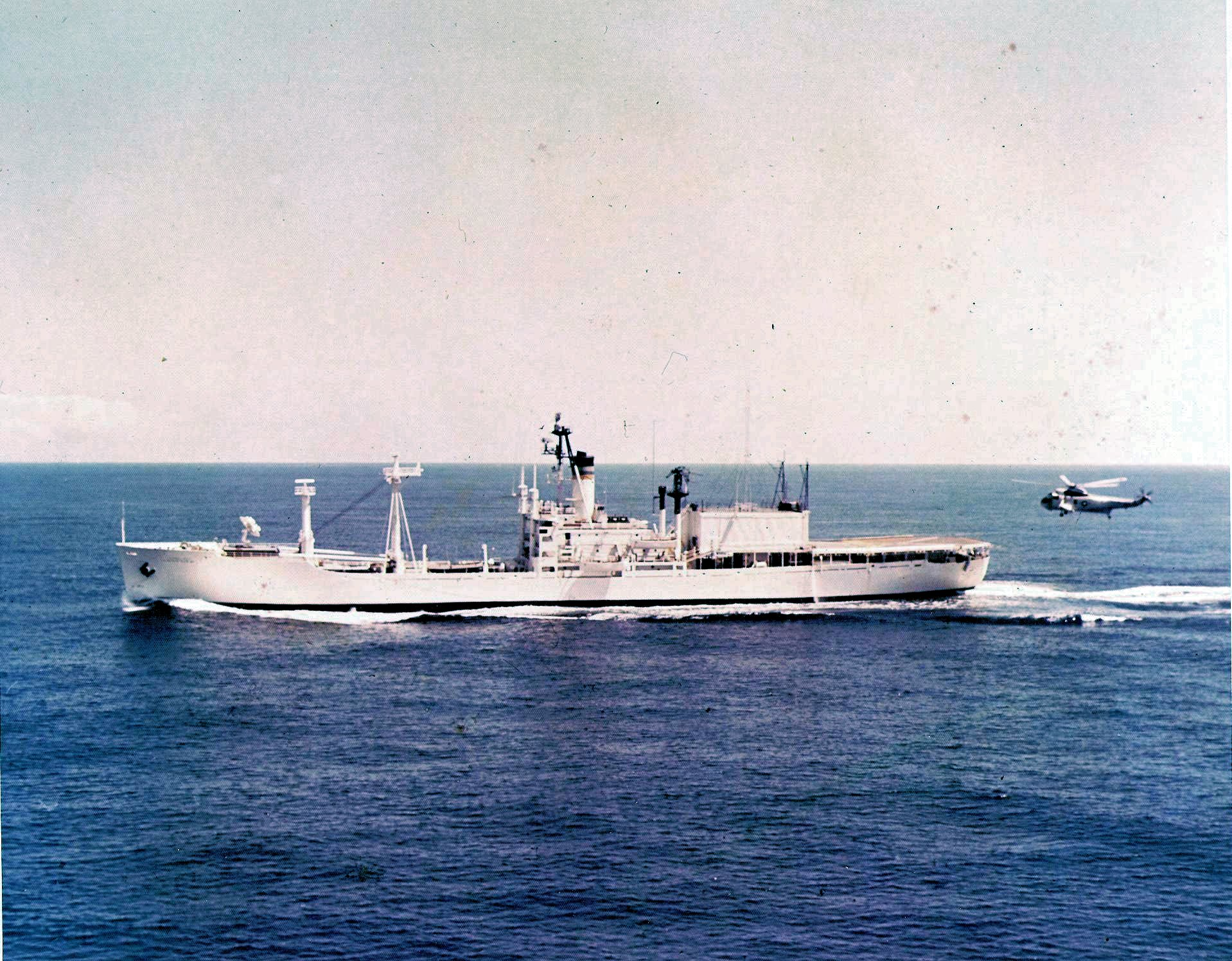
USNS Longview

Haiti Victory was built by Permanente Metals Corporation, Richmond, California. Her keel was laid on 22 April 1945. She was launched on 2 June and delivered on 27 June. Built for the WSA, she was operated under the management of Waterman Steamship Corporation. She was laid up at Wilmington, North Carolina in 1948. To the United States Navy in 1950. Operated by the MSTS. Converted to a Missile Range Instrumentation Ship in July 1959 and renamed Longview. To the United States Maritime Administration in 1974 and laid up in Suisun Bay. She was scrapped at Portland, Oregon in 1976.

== Halaula Victory ==
Halaula Victory was built by Permanente Metals Corporation. Her keel was laid on 17 November 1944. She was launched on 9 January 1945 and delivered on 29 January. Built for the WSA, she was operated under the management of Matson Navigation Company. Laid up at Wilmington, North Carolina in 1947. Later transferred to the James River. She was scrapped at Alang, India in 1993.

== Hamilton Victory ==
Hamilton Victory was built by Permanente Metals Corporation. Her keel was laid on 8 May 1945. She was launched on 15 June and delivered on 6 August. Built for the WSA, she was operated under the management of American President Lines. She was laid up at Wilmington, North Carolina in 1948. Returned to service in 1966 due to the Vietnam War. Operated under the management of American President Lines. Laid up in Suisun Bay in 1973. She was scrapped in 1993.

== Hampden-Sydney Victory ==
Hampden-Sydney Victory was a troop transport built by Bethlehem Fairfield Shipyard. Her keel was laid on 30 May 1945. She was launched on 14 July and delivered on 22 August. Built for the WSA, she was operated under the management of A. H. Bull & Co. Laid up in the James River in 1946. Sold in 1947 to T. C. Munakalat Vakaleti Devlet Denizyollarive Limanlari Isletme, Istanbul, Turkey and renamed Coruh. Sold in 1952 to Denizcilik Bankasi T.A.O., Istanbul. Sold in 1955 to D. B. Deniz Nakliyati T.A.O., Istanbul. She was scrapped at İzmir, Turkey in 1977.

== Hannibal Victory ==
Hannibal Victory was built by Permanente Metals Corporation. Her keel was laid on 23 October 1944. She was launched on 21 December and delivered on 25 January 1945. Built for the WSA, she was operated under the management of American President Lines. Laid up in Suisun Bay in 1946. Returned to service in 1966 due to the Vietnam War. Operated under the management of States Steamship Company. Laid up in Suisun Bay in 1973. She was scrapped at Brownsville, Texas in 2006.

== Harnett ==
Harnett was to have been built by Oregon Shipbuilding Corporation, Portland, Oregon for the United States Navy. The order was cancelled on 14 August 1945.

== Harvard Victory ==
Harvard Victory was built by Permanente Metals Corporation. Her keel was laid on 7 December 1944. She was launched on 27 January 1945 and delivered on 21 February. Built for the WSA, she was operated under the management of American-West African Line. Laid up in the Hudson River in 1948. Later transferred to the James River. She was scrapped at Alang in 1993.

== Haskell ==
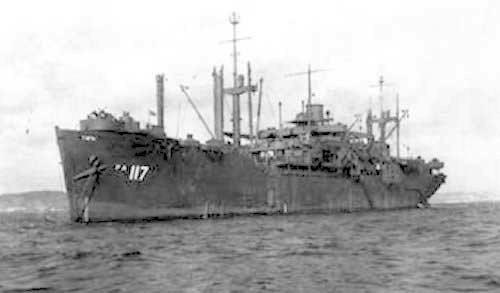
USS Haskell

Haskell was built by California Shipbuilding Corporation, Terminal Island, Los Angeles, California. Her keel was laid on 27 May 1944. She was launched on 17 July and delivered on 25 August. Built for the United States Navy. To the United States Maritime Commission (USMC) in 1946, laid up in the James River. She was scrapped in 1973.

== Hastings Victory ==
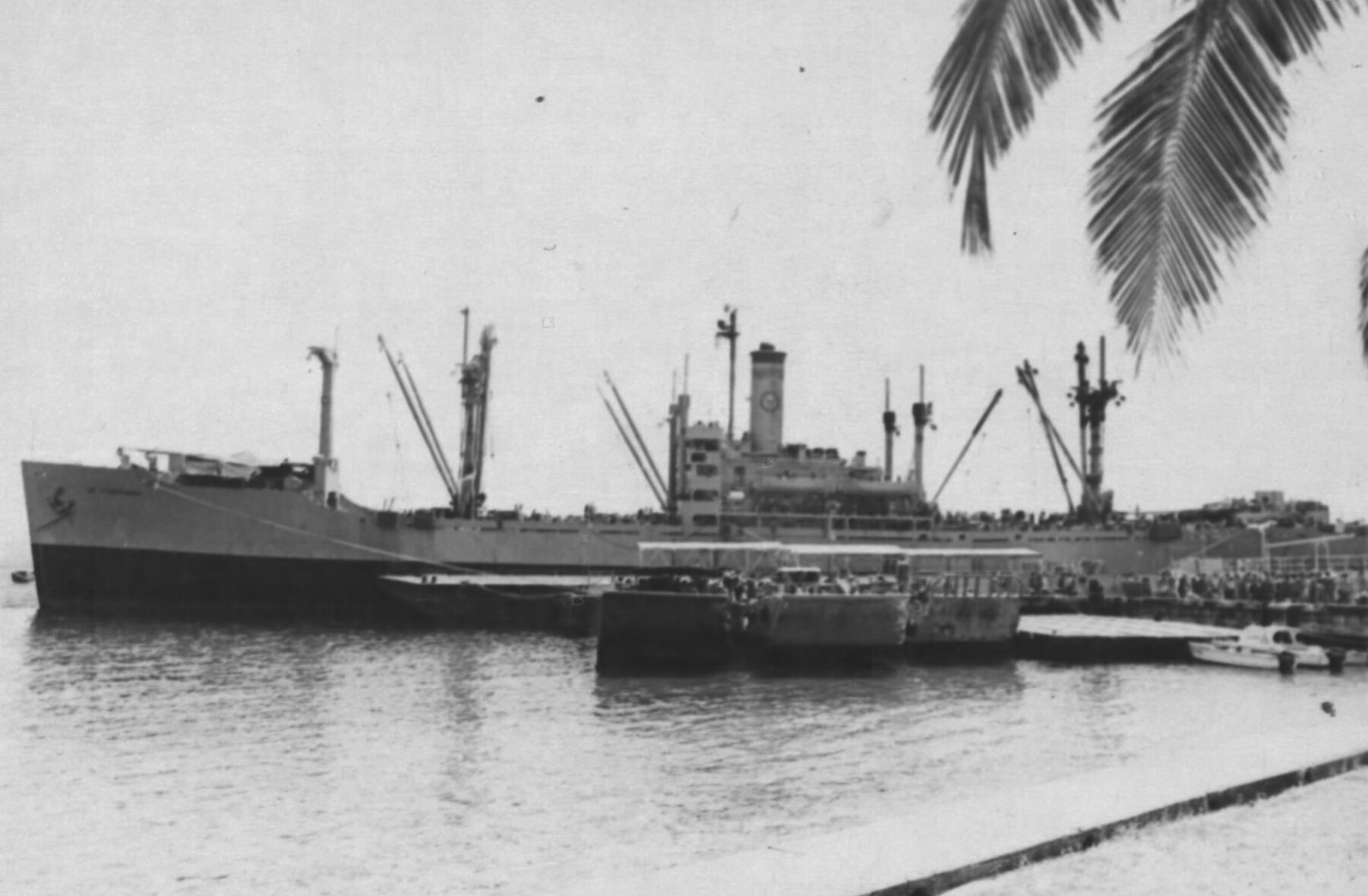
USNS Sgt. Truman Kimbro

Hastings Victory was built by Permanente Metals Corporation. Her keel was laid on 30 September 1944. She was launched on 30 November and delivered on 22 December. Built for the WSA, she was operated under the management of Grace Line Inc. To the United States Army Transportation Corps in 1947 and renamed Sgt. Truman Kimbro. To the USMC in 1950, laid up at Olympia, Washington. To the United States Navy later that year due to the Korean War. Operated by MSTS. To the United States Maritime Administration in 1976. Laid up in Suisun Bay. She was sold for scrapping in 1982.

== Hattiesburg Victory ==
Hattiesburg Victory was built by California Shipbuilding Corporation. Her keel was laid on 9 June 1945. She was launched on 14 August and delivered on 15 September. Built for the WSA, she was operated under the management of American-Hawaiian Steamship Company. Laid up at Beaumont, Texas in 1948. Reactivated in 1985, placed under "ready reserve". She was still laid up as of 2004.

== Haverford Victory ==
Haverford Victory was a troop transport built by Bethlehem Fairfield Shipyard. Her keel was laid on 8 May 1945. She was launched on 20 June and delivered on 23 July. Built for the WSA, she was operated under the management of J. H. Winchester & Company. Sold in 1946 to N.V. Vereenigde Nederlandsche Scheepvaarts Maatschappij, Den Haag, Netherlands and renamed Gripskerk. Renamed Meliskerk in 1947. Sold in 1964 to Marciera Compania Navigation, Piraeus, Greece and renamed Persian Cambysses II. She put in to Durban, South Africa on 13 November 1968 due to machinery damage. Subsequently detained for debt. In February 1969, it was ordered that she be removed within a month as she was "likely to become and obstruction, wreck or derelict". The instruction was not complied with and she was seized by the Durban Ports Authority. She was sold to South African buyers in May 1969, then resold in December 1970. Buyers were Time Lines Ltd., Panama and she was renamed Tien Tal. She was scrapped at Kaohsiung, Taiwan in June 1972.

== Hempstead ==
Hempstead was to have been built by Oregon Shipbuilding Corporation for the United States Navy. The order was cancelled on 14 August 1945.

== Hendry ==
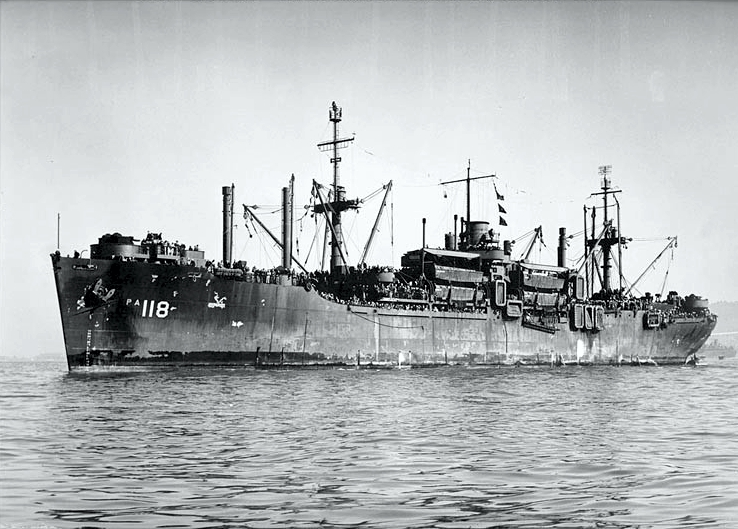
USS Hendry

Hendry was built by California Shipbuilding Corporation. Her keel was laid on 30 May 1944. She was launched on 6 August and delivered on 21 October. Built for the United States Navy. To the USMC in 1946 and laid up in the James River. She was sold to New York shipbreakers in April 1973.

== Hibbing Victory ==
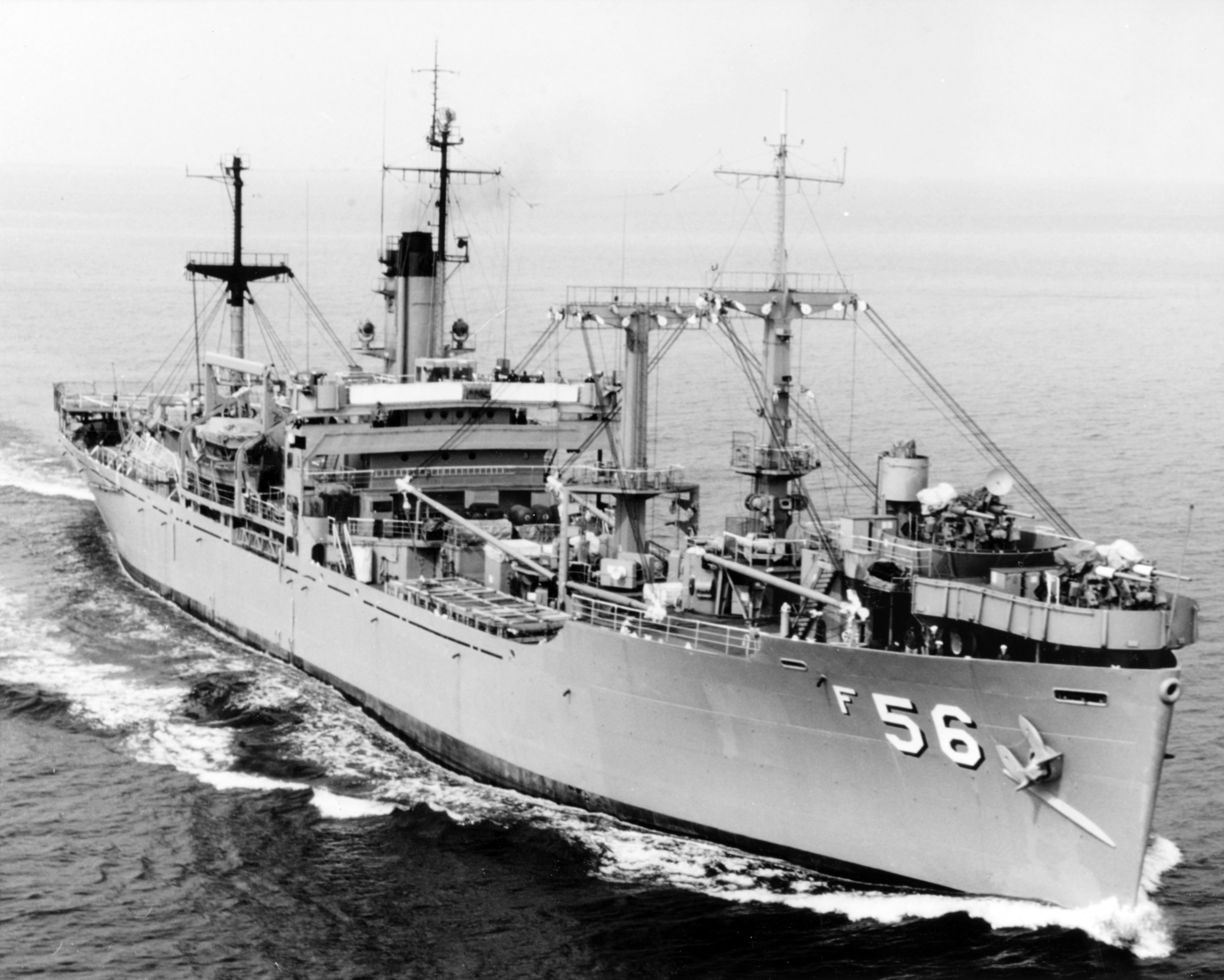
USS Denebola

Hibbing Victory was built by Oregon Shipbuilding Corporation. Her keel was laid on 2 May 1944. She was launched on 10 June and delivered on 30 June. Built for the WSA, she was operated under the management of Pacific-Atlantic Steamship Company. Laid up at Wilmington, North Carolina in 1948. Chartered to American Foreign Steamship Corporation in 1950. To the United States Navy in 1952 and renamed Denebola. Converted to a refrigerated store ship by Todd Shipyards, Brooklyn, New York. She was sold for scrapping in 1976.

== High Point Victory ==
High Point Victory was built by Bethlehem Fairfield Shipyard. Her keel was laid on 10 July 1945. She was launched on 6 September and delivered on 28 September. Built for the WSA, she was operated under the management of American Foreign Steamship Corporation. Laid up at Wilmington, North Carolina in 1948. Returned to service in 1966 due to the Vietnam War. Operated under the management of States Steamship Company. Laid up at Beaumont in 1973. She was scrapped at Alang in 1994.

== Highlands ==
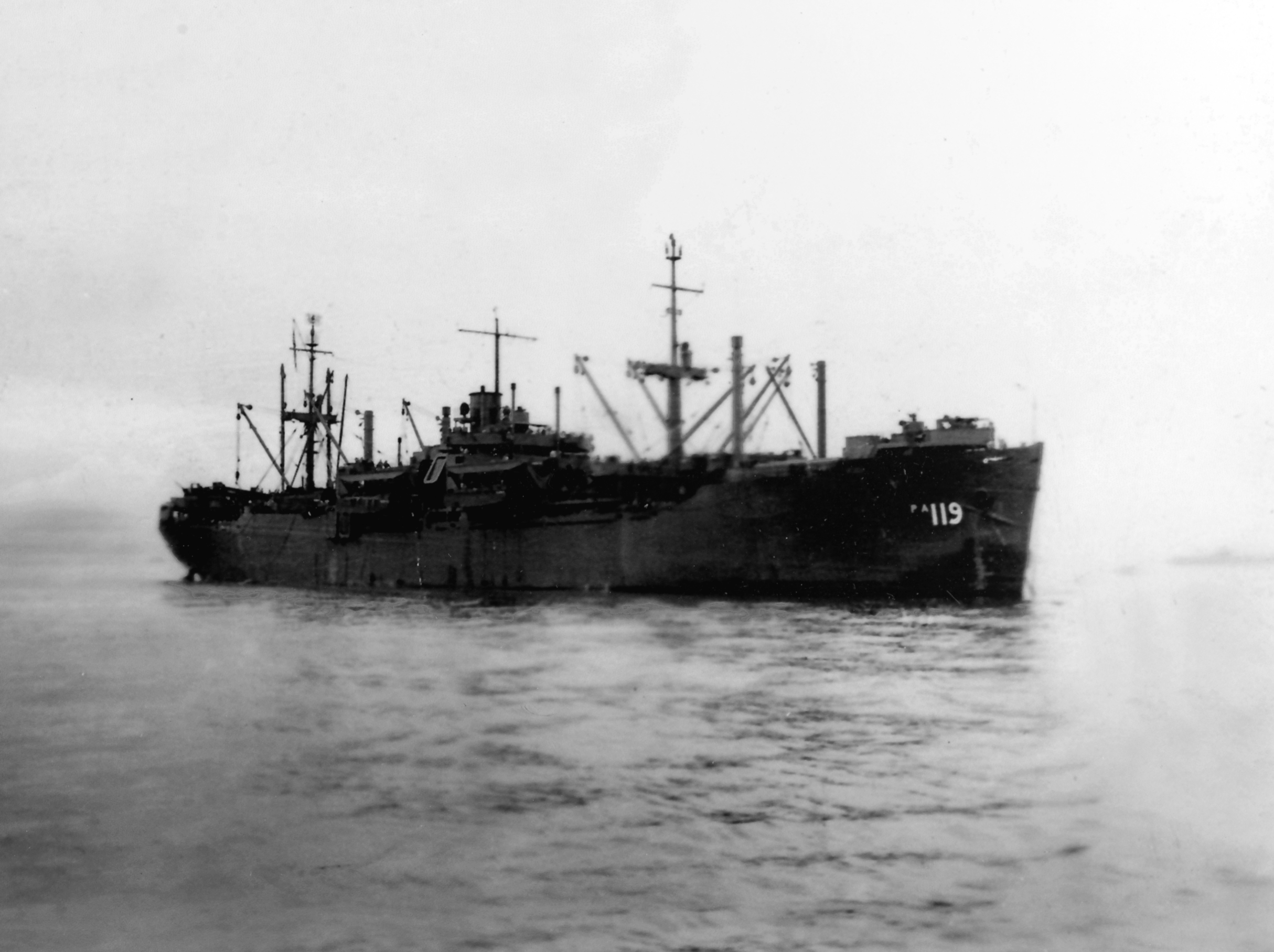
USS Highlands

Highlands was built by California Shipbuilding Corporation. Her keel was laid on 13 June 1944. She was launched on 21 August and delivered on 31 October. Built for the United States Navy. To the USMC in 1946 and laid up in the James River. She was sold to New York shipbreakers in April 1973.

== Hillsdale Victory ==
Hillsdale Victory was built by Permanente Metals Corporation. Her keel was laid on 16 May 1945. She was launched on 23 June and delivered on 4 August. Built for the WSA, she was operated under the management of De La Rama Steamship Company, Inc. Sold in 1946 to N.V. Java-China-Japan Lijn, Amsterdam, Netherlands and renamed Tjipondok. Sold in 1947 to N.V. Java-China Paketvaart Lijnen, Amsterdam, which became N. V. Koninklijk Java-China Paketvaart Lijnen later that year. She was scrapped at Kaohsiung in April 1971.

== Hinsdale ==
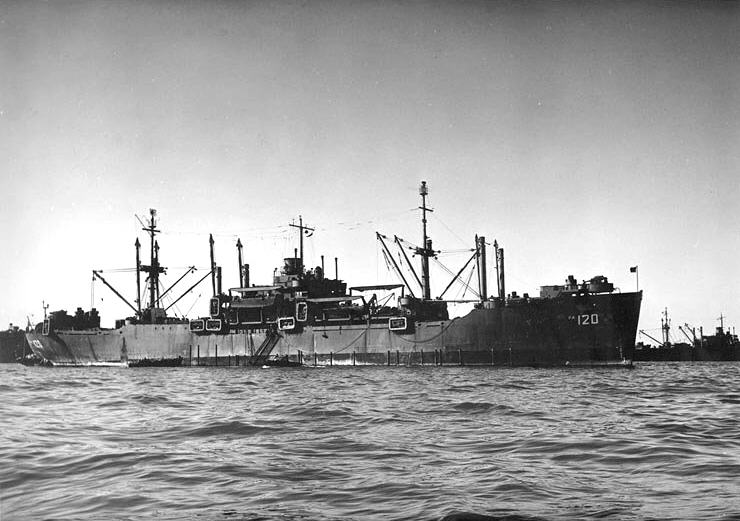
USS Hinsdale

Hinsdale was built by California Shipbuilding Corporation. Her keel was laid on 21 June 1944. She was launched on 28 August and delivered on 31 October. Built for the United States Navy. To the USMC in 1946 and laid up in the James River. She was scrapped at Rotterdam, Netherlands in 1974.

== Hobart Victory ==
Hobart Victory was built by Permanente Metals Corporation. Her keel was laid on 20 April 1945. She was launched on 25 May and delivered on 24 July. Built for the WSA, she was operated under the management of Black Diamond Steamship Company. Laid up at Wilmington, North Carolina in 1948. Returned to service in 1966 due to the Vietnam War. Laid up in the James River in 1973. She was scrapped at Alang in 1984.

== Hobbs Victory ==
Hobbs Victory was built by Permanente Metals Corporation. Her keel was laid on 10 November 1944. She was launched on 9 January 1945 and delivered on 5 February. Built for the WSA, she was operated under the management of Sudden & Christenson. She was set afire by a kamikaze attack at Okinawa, Japan (25°50′N 127°14′E) on 6 April 1945. She exploded and sank the next day.

== Hocking ==
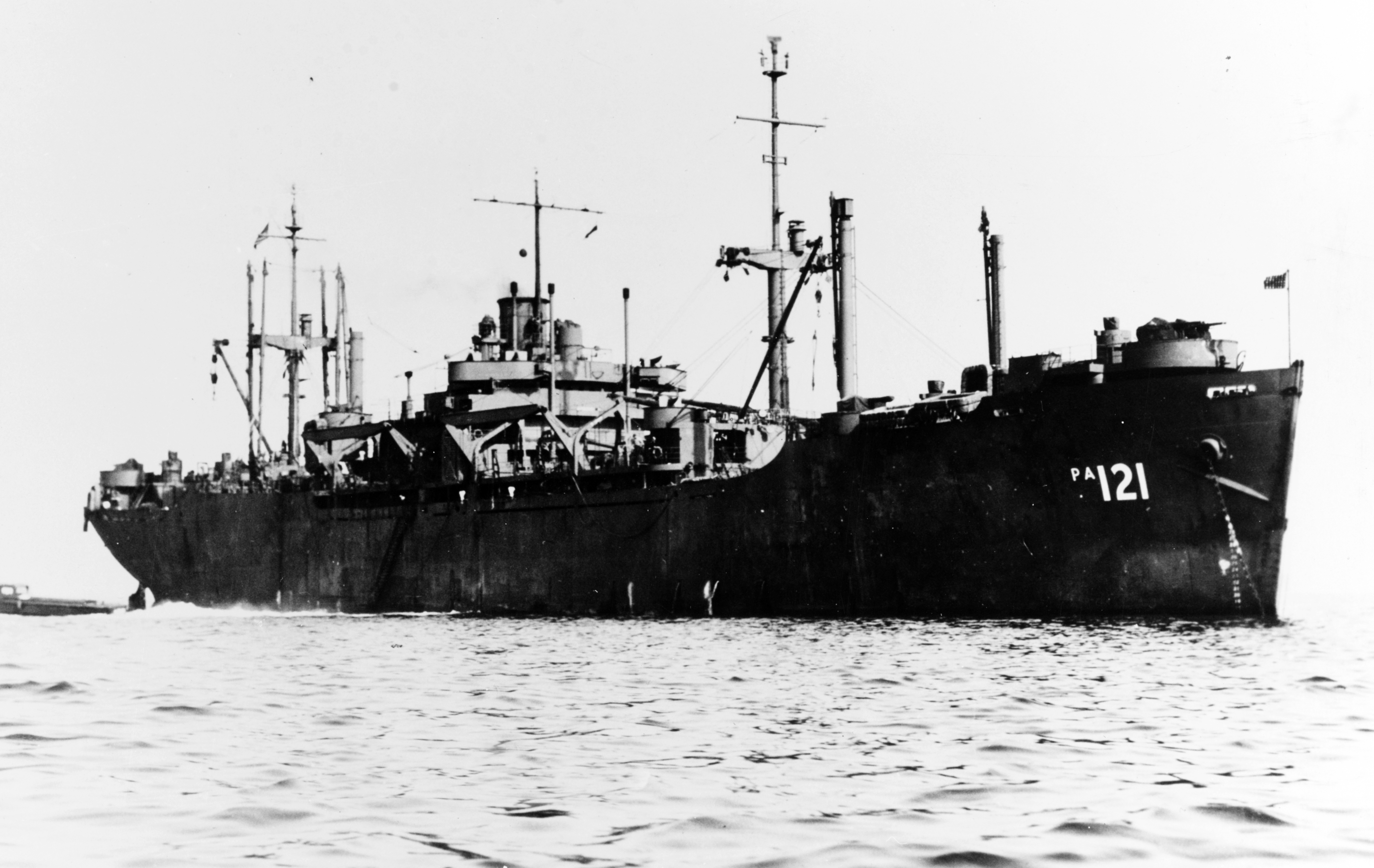
USS Hocking

Hocking was built by California Shipbuilding Corporation. Her keel was laid on 7 June 1944. She was launched on 25 July and delivered on 31 August. Built for the United States Navy. To the USMC in 1946 and laid up in the James River. She was scrapped in 1974.

== Honduras Victory ==
Honduras Victory was built by Permanente Metals Corporation. Her keel was laid on 6 April 1944. She was launched on 7 July and delivered on 26 August. Built for the WSA, she was operated under the management of Calmar Steamship Company. Sold in 1948 to American Export Lines, New York. To the United States Department of Commerce in 1958, leased back to her former owners. Laid up in the James River in 1961. Later transferred to Suisun Bay. She was scrapped at San Jose, California in May 1971.

== Hood Victory ==
Hood Victory was a troop transport built by Bethlehem Fairfield Shipyard. Her keel was laid on 25 April 1945. She was launched on 9 June and delivered on 5 July. Built for the WSA, she was operated under the management of Blidberg Rothchild Company. Sold in 1947 to Compania de Vapores Statel S.A., Panama and renamed Salamis Victory. Sold in 1948 to Compagnie Maritime Belge Lloyd Royal, Antwerp, Belgium and renamed Marchovelette. Sold in 1964 to Torrence Navigation Co., Liberian and renamed Hongkong Merchant. Sold in 1965 to Overseas Maritime Co., Liberia. She was scrapped at Kaohsiung in 1973.

== Hope Victory ==
Hope Victory was built by Permanente Metals Corporation. Her keel was laid on 22 March 1945. She was launched on 2 May and delivered on 26 May. Built for the WSA, she was operated under the management of McCormick Steamship Company. Laid up in the James River in 1947. Returned to service in 1966 due to the Vietnam War. Operated under the management of Matson Navigation Company. Laid up in Suisun Bay in 1973. She was scrapped at Alang in 1990.

== Howard Victory ==
Howard Victory was a troop transport built by Bethlehem Fairfield Shipyard. Her keel was laid on 29 March 1945. She was launched on 14 May and delivered on 8 June. Built for the WSA, she was operated under the management of William J. Rountree Company. Laid up in the James River in 1946. Sold in 1947 to Flota Mercante del Estado, Buenos Aires, Argentina and renamed Rio Aguapey. Sold in 1961 to Empresa Lineas Maritimas Argentina, Buenos Aires. She was scrapped at Campana, Argentina in July 1972.

== Hunter Victory ==
Hunter Victory was built by Permanente Metals Corporation. Her keel was laid on 31 March 1945. She was launched on 12 May and delivered on 6 June. Built for the WSA, she was operated under the management of Oliver J. Olson & Company. Laid up in the Hudson River in 1948. She was returned to service in 1966 due to the Vietnam War. Operated under the management of American President Lines. Laid up in Suisun Bay in 1973. She was scrapped at Kaohsiung in 1988.

== Hyde ==
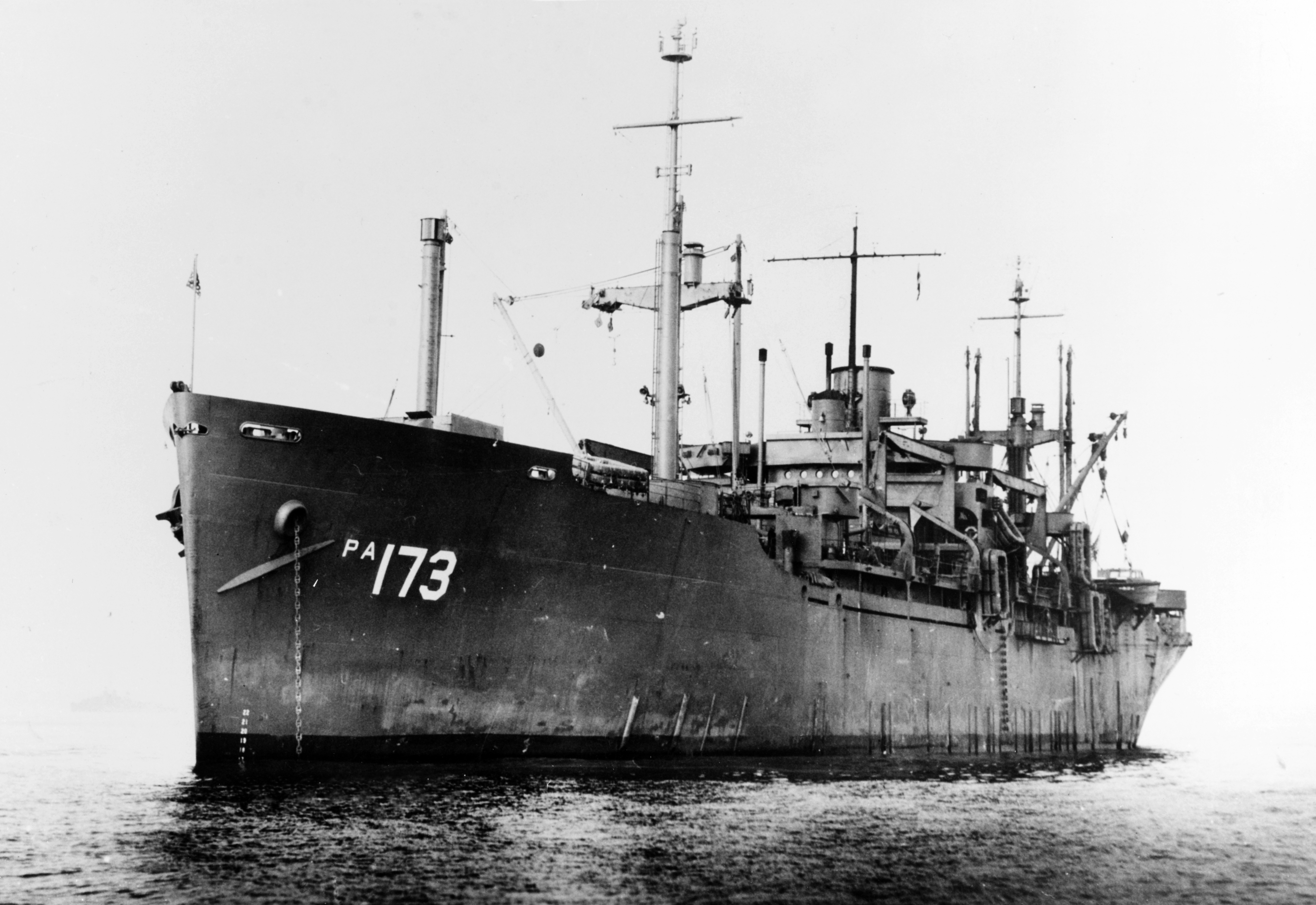
USS Hyde

Hyde was built by Oregon Shipbuilding Corporation. Her keel was laid on 14 September 1944. She was launched on 30 October and delivered on 25 November. Built for the United States Navy. To the USMC in 1946 and laid up in the James River. She was scrapped in 1983.
