= Ore Steamship Company =

Subsidiary of Bethlehem Steel Company

Ore Steamship Company - Ore Navigation Corporation
- Industry: Iron Ore Shipping
- Founded: 1927 New York City, United States
- Parent: Bethlehem Steel

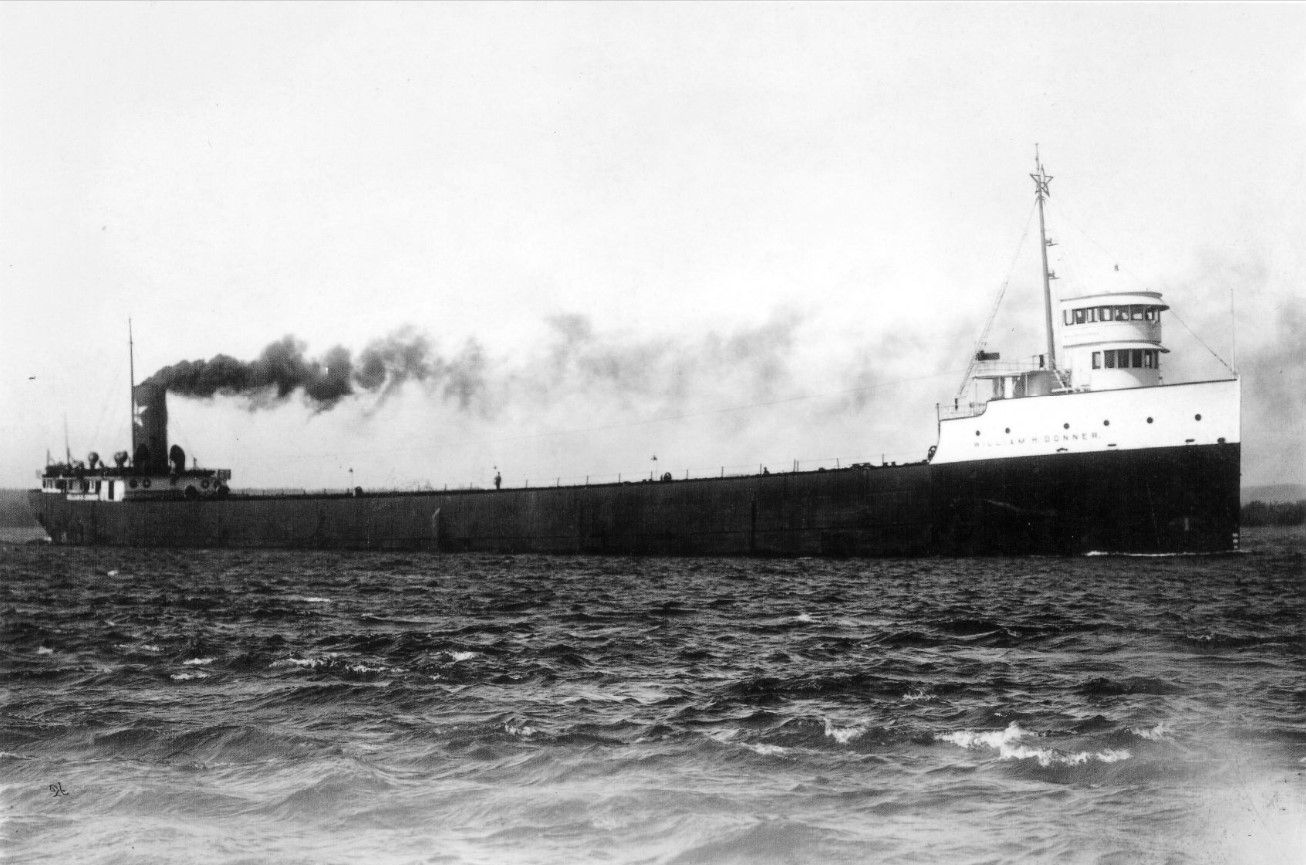
SS William H. Donner, 1914 Great Lake freighter cargo ship

Ore Steamship Company and the Ore Navigation Corporation were subsidiaries of the Bethlehem Steel Company founded in New York City in 1927. Ore Steamship Company was a proprietary company that was founded so Bethlehem Steel could move goods needed by Bethlehem Steel Company. Ore Steamship Company would transport iron ore to the Bethlehem Steel mills on the Atlantic coast. Some ships took steel and steel products to Bethlehem Shipyards. Port of Baltimore was a major Bethlehem Steel port, the dock was 2,200 feet long in order to load and unload three large, 28,000-ton cargo ships at the same time.

- Ore ships:
- SS Texar, was Harold O. Wilson
- SS Bethflor, steel-carrying cargo ship
- Lagonda 1896 cargo ship
- Cambria
- SS William H. Donner, 1914 cargo ship
- ELBA
- Chilore
- Cubore
- Fletmore
- Marore
- Oremore
- Santmor
- Steelmore
- Venmore was built at Bethlehem Sparrows Point 583-feet long and 78-feet wide, had steam turbine engines to a single propeller, top speed of 16 knots, had 7 sister ships. Scrapped in Santander, Spain in 1970.
- E.H. Utley, built Min 1910 by Detroit Shipbuilding Co.
- Bethcoal No. 1, No. 2, No. 3, 1962 Hopper Barge
- Punta Aramaya, was built at Bethlehem Sparrows Point Shipyard, 381-feet long and 64-feet wide, work on the Orinoco River in Venezuela, operated by Iron Mines Company. Hd 4 sister ships.
  - Tug:
- Tunism, tugboat, built by St. Louis Shipbuilding and Steel Company, scrapped 1960.

== See also ==
- Calmar Steamship Company
- Interocean Shipping Company
- Bethlehem Transportation Corporation
