= Interocean Shipping Company =

Defunct American shipping company

- Industry: Shipping
- Founded: 1930s San Francisco, California, United States
- Defunct: 1986
- Fate: Closed
- Key people: Steven Moodie
- Parent: Bethlehem Steel

A typical Victory ship

Interocean Shipping Company, Interocean Steamship Company of San Francisco was a subsidiary of the Bethlehem Steel Company founded in the late 1930s and closed in 1986.

During World War II Interocean Shipping Company operated Merchant navy ships for the United States Shipping Board. During World War II Interocean Shipping Company was active with charter shipping with the Maritime Commission and War Shipping Administration.Interocean Shipping Company operated Liberty ships and Victory ships for the merchant navy. The ship was run by its Interocean Shipping Company crew and the US Navy supplied United States Navy Armed Guards to man the deck guns and radio.

== Ships ==
- Ships:
- Partial list as most ships were charted and not owned by Interocean:
- Oswego Reliance, a tanker
- James E. Davidson, a cargo ship
- SS Cosmic, a 745-foot cargo ship (charted not owned)

1930s charted:

- Hanley (US)
- Brimanger (Norway)
- Taranger (Norway)
- Heranger (Norway)
- Villanger (Norway)
- Trondanger (Norway)
- Berganger (Norway)
- MS Moldanger (Norway)
- Hindanger (Norway)

- Interocean operated World War 2 ships:
  - World War 2 Victory ships:'
  - World War 2 chartered ships:
- SS Augustana Victory
- Denison Victory
- Bowdoin Victory
- SS Notre Dame Victory
- Wabash Victory
  - World War 2 operated Liberty ships:
- SS Elwood Mead
- Ben B. Lindsey
- Edward P. Alexander
- Alfred C. True
- Anna H. Branch
- Keith Vawter
- James A. Drain
- James L. Ackerson
- Isaac I. Stevens
- SS Lewis L. Dyche
- Mello Franco

== See also ==
- Calmar Steamship Company
- Ore Steamship Company
- Bethlehem Transportation Corporation
- World War II United States Merchant Navy
