= SS Christopher Newport =

Liberty ship of WWII

History

United States
- Name: Christopher Newport
- Namesake: Christopher Newport
- Owner: War Shipping Administration (WSA)
- Operator: Calmar Steamship Corporation
- Ordered: as type (EC2-S-C1) hull, MCE hull 21
- Awarded: 14 March 1941
- Builder: Bethlehem-Fairfield Shipyard, Baltimore, Maryland
- Cost: $1,267,658
- Yard number: 2008
- Way number: 8
- Laid down: 25 August 1941
- Launched: 15 February 1942
- Completed: 30 March 1942
- Fate: Sunk, 4 July 1942

General characteristics
- Class & type: Liberty ship; type EC2-S-C1, standard
- Tonnage: 10,865 LT DWT; 7,176 GRT
- Displacement: 3,380 long tons (3,434 t) (light); 14,245 long tons (14,474 t) (max)
- Length: 441 feet 6 inches (135 m) oa; 416 feet (127 m) pp; 427 feet (130 m) lwl
- Beam: 57 feet (17 m)
- Draft: 27 ft 9.25 in (8.4646 m)
- Installed power: 2 × Oil fired 450 °F (232 °C) boilers, operating at 220 psi (1,500 kPa); 2,500 hp (1,900 kW)
- Propulsion: 1 × triple-expansion steam engine, (manufactured by Clark Bros. Co., Cleveland, Ohio); 1 × screw propeller
- Speed: 11.5 knots (21.3 km/h; 13.2 mph)
- Capacity: 562,608 cubic feet (15,931 m^{3}) (grain); 499,573 cubic feet (14,146 m^{3}) (bale)
- Complement: 38–62 USMM; 21–40 USNAG
- Armament: Varied by ship; Bow-mounted 3-inch (76 mm)/50-caliber gun; Stern-mounted 4-inch (102 mm)/50-caliber gun; 2–8 × single 20-millimeter (0.79 in) Oerlikon anti-aircraft (AA) cannons and/or, 2–8 × 37-millimeter (1.46 in) M1 AA guns

SS Christopher Newport was a Liberty ship built in the United States during World War II. She was named after Christopher Newport, who was an English seaman and privateer. He is best known as the captain of Susan Constant, the largest of three ships which carried settlers for the Virginia Company, in 1607, on the way to found the settlement at Jamestown, in the Virginia Colony, which became the first permanent English settlement in North America. He was also in overall command of the other two ships on that initial voyage, in order of their size, Godspeed and Discovery.

He made several voyages of supply between England and Jamestown; in 1609, he became Captain of the Virginia Company's new supply ship, Sea Venture, which met a hurricane during the Third Supply mission, and was shipwrecked on the archipelago of Bermuda.

== Construction ==
Christopher Newport was laid down on 25 August 1941, under a Maritime Commission (MARCOM) contract, MCE hull 21, by the Bethlehem-Fairfield Shipyard, Baltimore, Maryland; and was launched on 15 February 1942.

== History ==
She was allocated to Calmar Steamship Corporation, on 30 March 1942.

=== Sinking ===
Christopher Newport had set out from Baltimore, on her maiden voyage, in June 1942. She sailed from Hvalfjordur, Iceland, on the afternoon of 27 June 1942, with 8,200 LT (8,300 t) of war materials aboard, for Arkhangelsk, in Convoy PQ-17. On the morning of 4 July 1942, a German Heinkel He 115, from Küstenfliegergruppe 906 released a torpedo about one-half mi (0.80 km) from Christopher Newport that passed between the merchant ship SS Carlton and the Liberty ship SS Samuel Chase before striking her starboard side amidship. A large hole was torn in the hull which completely flooded the engine room. One officer and two crewmen were killed and the steering gear destroyed. The rest of the crew abandoned ship. One of her escorts, submarine HMS P614, attempted to scuttle her, but she remained afloat. At 08:08, she was discovered abandoned and sunk by torpedoes from German submarine U-457, at 75°49′N 25°15′E, northeast of Bear Island.

== Bibliography ==
- "Bethlehem-Fairfield, Baltimore MD". www.ShipbuildingHistory.com. 14 August 2008.
- Maritime Administration. "Christopher Newport". Ship History Database Vessel Status Card. U.S. Department of Transportation, Maritime Administration.
- Davies, James (May 2004). "Specifications (As-Built)" (PDF). p. 23.
- "SS Christopher Newport".
- "Christopher Newport".
