= SS Thomas Sully =

Liberty ship of WWII

History

United States
- Name: Thomas Sully
- Namesake: Thomas Sully
- Owner: War Shipping Administration (WSA)
- Operator: Calmar Steamship Corp.
- Ordered: as type (EC2-S-C1) hull, MC hull 1205
- Builder: St. Johns River Shipbuilding Company, Jacksonville, Florida
- Cost: $1,772,285
- Yard number: 13
- Way number: 1
- Laid down: 16 June 1943
- Launched: 11 September 1943
- Sponsored by: Mildred Pepper
- Completed: 27 September 1943
- Identification: Call sign: KXME
- Fate: Sold for commercial use, 30 January 1947, withdrawn from fleet, 5 February 1947

Panama
- Name: Actor
- Owner: Neptune Shipping, Ltd.
- Operator: Torrey Mosvold, Kristiansand
- Fate: Sold, 1949

Italy
- Name: Citta Di Palermo
- Owner: Sicilia Soc.di Nav
- Operator: Count Salvatore Tagliavia, Palermo
- Fate: Scrapped, 1963

General characteristics
- Class & type: Liberty ship; type EC2-S-C1, standard
- Tonnage: 10,865 LT DWT; 7,176 GRT
- Displacement: 3,380 long tons (3,434 t) (light); 14,245 long tons (14,474 t) (max)
- Length: 441 feet 6 inches (135 m) oa; 416 feet (127 m) pp; 427 feet (130 m) lwl
- Beam: 57 feet (17 m)
- Draft: 27 ft 9.25 in (8.4646 m)
- Installed power: 2 × Oil fired 450 °F (232 °C) boilers, operating at 220 psi (1,500 kPa); 2,500 hp (1,900 kW)
- Propulsion: 1 × triple-expansion steam engine, (manufactured by General Machinery Corp., Hamilton, Ohio); 1 × screw propeller
- Speed: 11.5 knots (21.3 km/h; 13.2 mph)
- Capacity: 562,608 cubic feet (15,931 m^{3}) (grain); 499,573 cubic feet (14,146 m^{3}) (bale)
- Complement: 38–62 USMM; 21–40 USNAG
- Armament: Varied by ship; Bow-mounted 3-inch (76 mm)/50-caliber gun; Stern-mounted 4-inch (102 mm)/50-caliber gun; 2–8 × single 20-millimeter (0.79 in) Oerlikon anti-aircraft (AA) cannons and/or, 2–8 × 37-millimeter (1.46 in) M1 AA guns

SS Thomas Sully was a Liberty ship built in the United States during World War II. She was named after Thomas Sully, an American portrait painter.

== Construction ==
Thomas Sully was laid down on 16 June 1943, under a Maritime Commission (MARCOM) contract, MC hull 1205, by the St. Johns River Shipbuilding Company, Jacksonville, Florida; she was sponsored by Mildred Pepper, the wife of Claude Pepper, then Floridas junior United States senator, and launched on 11 September 1943.

== History ==
She was allocated to the Calmar Steamship Corp., on 27 September 1943. On 18 May 1946, she was placed in the Hudson River Reserve Fleet, Jones Point, New York. She was placed in the National Defense Reserve Fleet, Wilmington, North Carolina, 5 November 1946. She was sold for commercial use, 30 January 1947, to Neptune Shipping, Ltd., for $544,506. She was withdrawn from the fleet, 17 February 1947.

Thomas Sully was renamed Actor and reflagged in Panama, in 1947. She was sold in 1949, to Sicilia Soc. di Nav. and reflagged in Italy, and renamed Citta Di Palermo. She was scrapped in 1963.

== Bibliography ==
- "St. John's River Shipbuilding, Jacksonville FL". www.ShipbuildingHistory.com. 16 October 2010.
- Maritime Administration. "Thomas Sully". Ship History Database Vessel Status Card. U.S. Department of Transportation, Maritime Administration.
- Davies, James (May 2004). "Specifications (As-Built)" (PDF). p. 23.
- "SS Thomas Sully".
