= SS Jeremiah M. Daily =

World War II Liberty ship of the United States

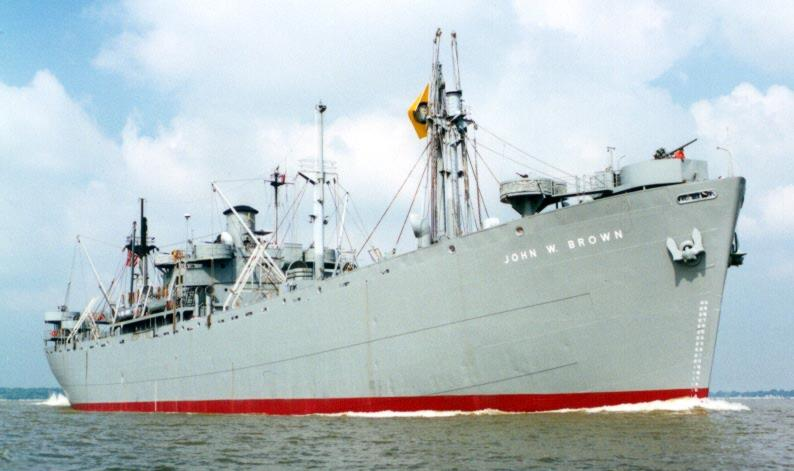
- SS John W Brown, a ship of the same class as the Jeremiah M. Daily

History

United States
- Name: Jeremiah M. Daily
- Namesake: Jeremiah M. Daily
- Owner: United States Maritime Commission
- Operator: American South African Line
- Builder: Permanente Metals Corp.
- Yard number: No. 2; Richmond, California
- Laid down: 18 July 1943
- Launched: 9 August 1943
- Completed: 9 August 1943
- Fate: Kamikazed 12 November 1944, scrapped in 1962

General characteristics
- Class & type: Liberty ship; type EC2-S-C1, standard
- Tonnage: 7,176 GRT, 10,865 DWT
- Displacement: 14,245 long tons (14,474 t)
- Length: 441 feet 6 inches (135 m) oa; 416 feet (127 m) pp; 427 feet (130 m) lwl
- Beam: 57 feet (17 m)
- Draft: 27 ft 9.25 in (8.4646 m)
- Propulsion: 1 × triple-expansion steam engine, (manufactured by Joshua Hendy Iron Works, Sunnyvale, California); 1 × screw propeller
- Speed: 11.5 knots (21.3 km/h; 13.2 mph)
- Capacity: 562,608 cubic feet (15,931 m^{3}) (grain); 499,573 cubic feet (14,146 m^{3}) (bale)
- Troops: 550
- Complement: 38–62 USMM; 21–40 USNAG
- Armament: Varied by ship; Bow-mounted 3-inch (76 mm)/50-caliber gun; Stern-mounted 4-inch (102 mm)/50-caliber gun; 2–8 × single 20-millimeter (0.79 in) Oerlikon anti-aircraft (AA) cannons and/or, 2–8 × 37-millimeter (1.46 in) M1 AA guns

SS Jeremiah M. Daily was a Liberty ship built for the United States Maritime Commission during World War II. The ship was named in honor of Jeremiah M. Daily, (1871-1924) who was the manager of marine department of the San Francisco Chamber of Commerce. Jeremiah M. Daily inspired Jerry Dooley and the Affairs of Cappy Ricks. The ship was assigned by the War Shipping Administration to American South African Line of New York who operated it throughout World War II. Jeremiah M. Daily was laid down on 18 July 1943, launched on 9 August 1943 and completed on 22 August 1943, with the hull No. 1724 as part of the Emergency Shipbuilding Program, built is 35 days.

== World War II ==
SS Jeremiah M. Daily arrived in the San Pedro Bay, in Leyte of the Philippines, to be part of the supply ships that supported the Battle of Leyte from 7 October to 26 December 1944 in the Pacific war campaign. She was anchored and not yet unloaded at Leyte Gulf at 11°10′N 125°06′E, when attacked. Jeremiah M. Daily was transporting combat troops, vehicles, fuel and other supplies with the 168th Ordnance Depot Company and 3483d Ordnance Medium Automotive Maintenance Company. On 12 November 1944 three Empire of Japan Kamikaze Zero planes started attacking her. The ship's United States Navy Armed Guard shot down one plane, but two planes hit the Jeremiah M. Daily. The first plane just missed the bridge, hit the ship's antennae and dropped into the bay just thirty feet of her port. At 6:20pm the next plane the hit the starboard superstructure and the ship's bridge, plane and its aerial bomb exploded. The fire started the cargo of ammunition and fuel barrels to exploded and burn. The attacks killed more than 100 mean, including all those on the bridge who died. Many on the ship received severe burns. Fireboat put vasts amounts of water in the ship to stop the fire, that the ship began to list. Some of the cargo was lost in the fire or by the salt water used to put out the fire. The Ordnance maintenance company lost Twenty-eight men and the depot company lost Twenty-eight men. Most of Armed Guard and seamen were killed also, the total killed 160. The Liberty ship SS Thomas Nelson had heavy losses the same day at Leyte.

== Post war ==
Jeremiah M. Daily was repaired and later sold to a private company, Waterman Steamship Corporation, of Mobile, Alabama in 1947 and renamed Governor Kilby. In 1948 she was sold to Atlanticus Steamship Inc and renamed the SS Atlanticus operated by the Atlantic Cargo Carrier Corporation in New York. In 1956 she was sold and renamed SS Sag Harbor by Terrace Navigation Corporation. In 1961 United States Department of Commerce took over the ship. In 1962 she was scrapped as the SS Sag Harbor in New Jersey.

== See also ==
- Allied technological cooperation during World War II
- List of Liberty ships
- Type C1 ship
- Type C2 ship
- Victory ship
- U.S. Merchant Marine Academy
