= Bethlehem Transportation Corporation =

Bethlehem Shipping Company

Bethlehem Transportation Corporation – Bethlehem Steamship Company
- Industry: Shipping
- Founded: 1924 Cleveland, Ohio United States
- Defunct: 1986
- Fate: Closed
- Area served: Great Lakes
- Key people: Herbert K. Oakes
- Parent: Bethlehem Steel Company

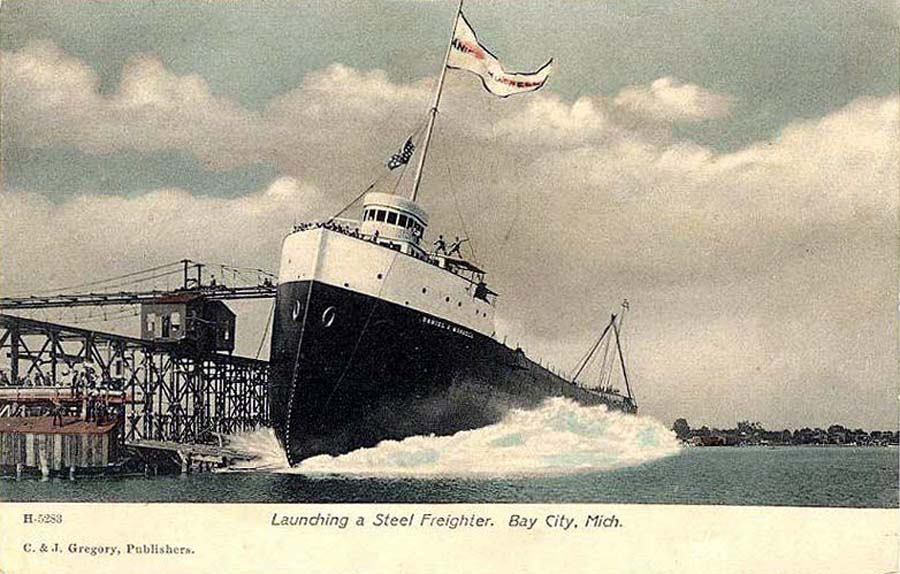
SS Daniel J. Morrell

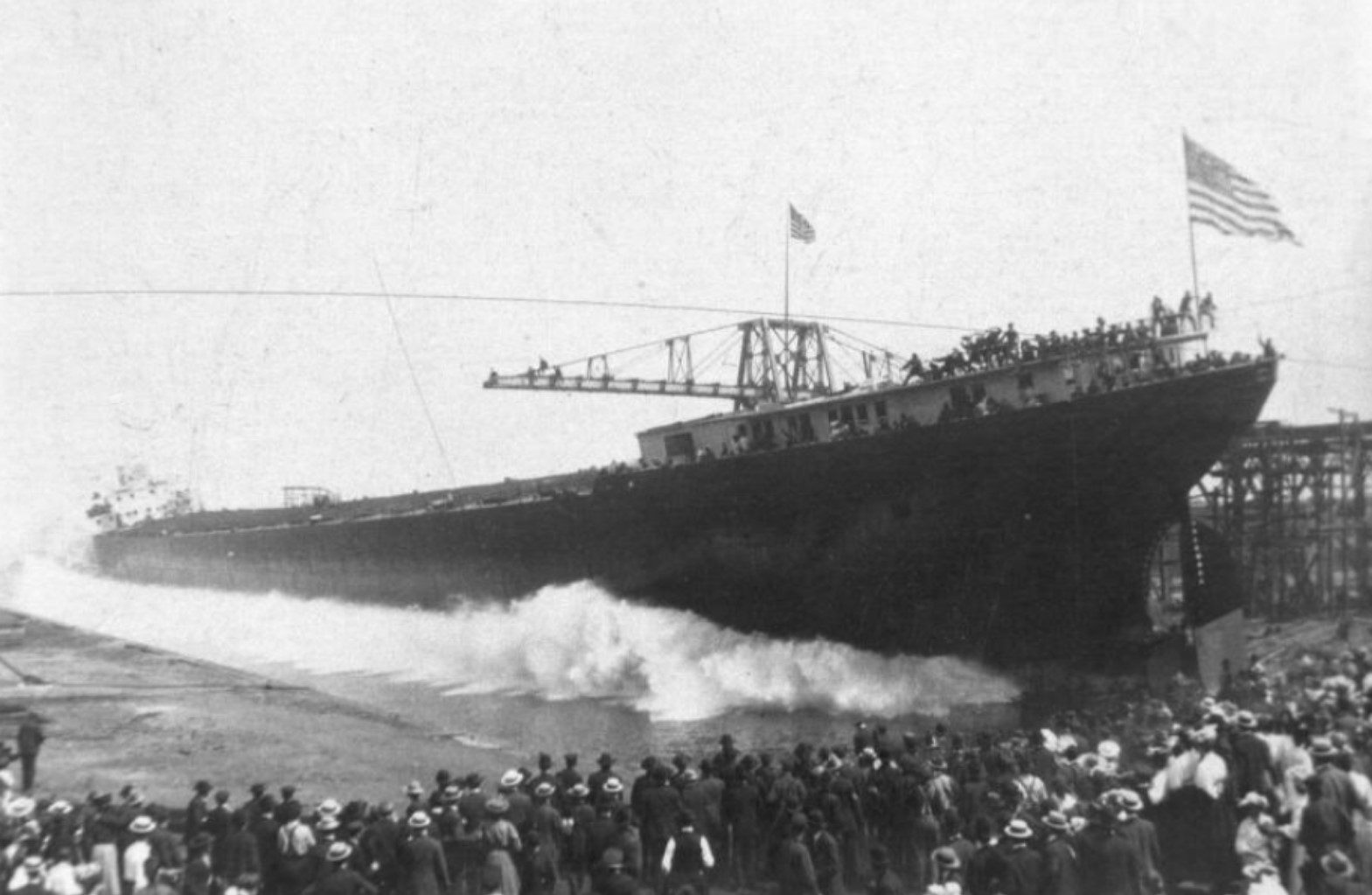
Launch of the SS Edward Y. Townsend

Bethlehem Transportation Corporation of Cleveland, Ohio was a shipping subsidiary of the Bethlehem Steel Company founded in 1924 as Bethlehem Steamship Company, the name changed in 1927.

== History ==
Bethlehem Steel Company acquired a fleet of lake freighter ships managed by Herbert K. Oakes. Herbert K. Oakes started as a lawyer with offices in Detroit and Cleveland. His legal work started in 1896 with the firm of Shaw, Warren, Cody & Oakes of Detroit. He departed the firm on May 7, 1911, to manage the shipping of iron ore for companies. He became the manager of Franklin Steamship Company in 1906, Fremont Steamship Company in 1908, Cadillac Steamship Company in 1912, and Beaver Steamship Company in 1916. The ship of these companies were acquired by Bethlehem Steel in 1924 when Herbert K. Oakes started working for Bethlehem Steel and formed Bethlehem Steamship Company in 1924.

== Ships ==
- Steel bulk carrier ships:
  - SS B. F. Berry, built 1908 by American Shipbuilding Company (Hull 357), from Berry Brothers, ships other names: SS Berryton, SS Viscount Bennett, and then SS C. A. Bennett
  - Leonard C. Hanna, built 1905 by American Ship Building, (Hull 425)
  - SS Edwin L. Booth, built 1901 by Detroit Shipbuilding Company (Hull 138), other names: SS David M. Whitney, SS G.N. Wilson, SS Thomas Britt, Buckeye
  - SS E. J. Earling, built 1906 by the Superior Shipbuilding Company (Hull 514), other names: SS Robert B. Wallace, SS Peter Robertson, (U.S. 203108)
  - Edward Y. Townsend, built 1906 by Superior Shipbuilding Company, (Hull 515)
  - SS Emory L. Ford, built 1916 by American Shipbuilding Company (Hull 715), other name: SS Raymond H. Reiss (U.S. 214318)
  - SS Fred G. Hartwell, built 1923 by American Shipbuilding (Hull 78l), other names: SS Matthew Andrews, SS George M. Carl (U.S. 222641)
  - SS Hernert K. Oakers, built 1907 by Great Lakes Engineering Works (Hull 30), other names: SS Milinokett, SS Steelton, SS Cornwall (U.S. 204393)
  - Daniel J. Morrell, built 1906 by West Bay City Shipbuilding Co., (Hull 619)
  - E. H. Utley, built 1910 by Detroit Shipbuilding (Hull 184), other name: SS Cambria (U.S. 207568)
  - Western Star, built 1903 by Detroit Shipbuilding (Hull 155), other names: SS Glenisla, SS Prescott (U.S. 200376)
  - SS William H. Donner, built 1914 by Great Lakes Engineering Works, (Hull 134)
  - Powell Stackhouse built 1905 by Detroit Shipbuilding (US 202339)
  - Saucon, built 1906 by West Bay City Shipbuilding, other names: SS Charles Weston
  - Lackawanna, built in 1908 by Great Lakes Engineering Works, Hull 43, named after Lackawanna Steel Company, other names: Daniel B. Meacham, Edwin E. Slick
  - Midvale, built 1917 by Great Lakes Engineering Works, (Hull 167)
  - Edward J. Berwind, built 1924 by Great Lakes Engineering Works, (Hull 247)
  - Fred G. Hartwell, built 1923 by American Ship Building, (Hull 781), other name: George M. Carl
  - Steelton, built 1943 by Great Lakes Engineering, a type L6-S-B1, other name: Frank Purnell, Robert C. Norton
  - Lehigh, built 1943 by Great Lakes Engineering, a L6-S-B1, other name: Mesabi, Joseph X. Robert, Willowglen
  - Sparrows Point, built 1952 at Bethlehem Sparrows Point Shipyard (Hull 4505)
  - Frank Purnell, built 1943 by Great Lakes Engineering, a L6-S-B1, (Hull 293)
  - Johnstown, built 1952 at Sparrows Point Shipyard (Hull 4505)
  - Arthur B. Homer, built 1960 at by Great Lakes Engineering Works, (Hull 303)

== See also ==
- Calmar Steamship Company
- Interocean Shipping Company
