= SS Lewis L. Dyche =

World War II Liberty ship of the United States

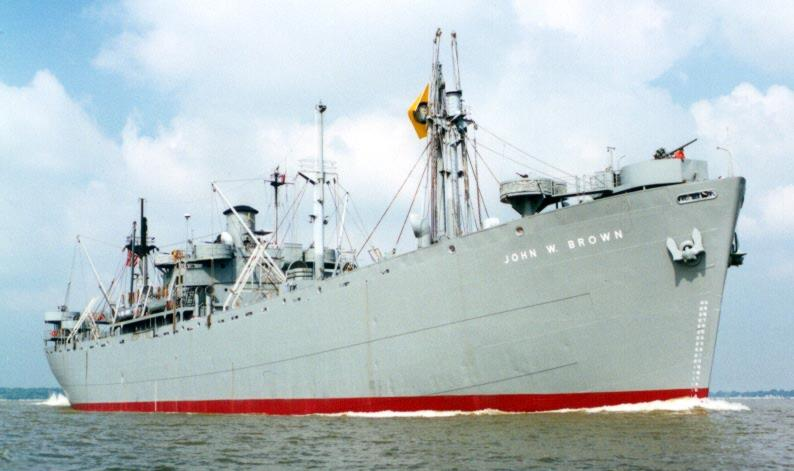
- SS John W Brown, a ship of the same class as the SS Lewis L. Dyche

History

United States
- Name: Lewis L. Dyche
- Namesake: Lewis Lindsay Dyche
- Owner: United States Maritime Commission
- Operator: Interocean Steamship Company
- Builder: Oregon Shipbuilding Corporation
- Yard number: 807
- Laid down: 6 November 1943
- Launched: 26 November 1943
- Completed: 9 December 1943
- Fate: Kamikaze attack and sank January 4, 1945, killed all 71 crew members

General characteristics
- Class & type: Liberty ship; type EC2-S-C1, standard
- Tonnage: 7,176 GRT, 10,865 DWT
- Displacement: 14,245 long tons (14,474 t)
- Length: 441 feet 6 inches (135 m) oa; 416 feet (127 m) pp; 427 feet (130 m) lwl
- Beam: 57 feet (17 m)
- Draft: 27 ft 9.25 in (8.4646 m)
- Propulsion: 1 × triple-expansion steam engine, (manufactured by Joshua Hendy Iron Works, Sunnyvale, California); 1 × screw propeller
- Speed: 11.5 knots (21.3 km/h; 13.2 mph)
- Capacity: 562,608 cubic feet (15,931 m^{3}) (grain); 499,573 cubic feet (14,146 m^{3}) (bale)
- Troops: 550
- Complement: 38–62 USMM; 21–40 USNAG
- Armament: Varied by ship; Bow-mounted 3-inch (76 mm)/50-caliber gun; Stern-mounted 4-inch (102 mm)/50-caliber gun; 2–8 × single 20-millimeter (0.79 in) Oerlikon anti-aircraft (AA) cannons and/or, 2–8 × 37-millimeter (1.46 in) M1 AA guns
- Notes: call sign: KVCT

SS Lewis L. Dyche was a Liberty ship built by the Oregon Shipbuilding Corporation for the United States Maritime Commission during World War II. The ship was named in honor of Lewis Lindsay Dyche. Lewis Lindsay Dyche (1857–1915) was an American naturalist and also the creator of the Panorama of North American Plants and Animals, which was featured in the Kansas Pavilion at the 1893 World's Columbian Exposition. The ship was assigned by the War Shipping Administration, she operated by Interocean Steamship Company of San Francisco during World War II. Lewis L. Dyche was laid down on 6 November 1943, launched on 26 November 1943 and completed on 9 December 1943, with the hull No. 807 as part of the Emergency Shipbuilding Program, built in 38 days.

== World war 2 ==
SS Lewis L. Dyche was loaded with bombs and fuses for the Pacific Ocean theater of World War II in San Francisco.

SS Lewis L. Dyche joined one-hundred-ship convoy TG 77.11, that was under the command of Captain J. B. McLean, The convoy was screened and protected by nine destroyers. The convoy headed to Mindoro an island in Luzon of the Philippines to support the Battle of Mindoro. The convoy arrived in the Philippines on December 28. As soon as the convoy arrived it was under almost continuous attack. Before arriving the PT tender USS Orestes was hit by a kamikaze plane. Liberty ships SS William Sharon and SS John Burke were both hit also. Burke sank with a large explosion and Sharon's had a large fire on her superstructure. LST-750 was sunk later in the day. On December 30 the convoy arrived Mangarin Bay in the morning. Five Imperial Japanese Navy (IJN) Aichi D3A started suicide attacks. The destroyers USS Gansevoort (DD-608) and USS Pringle (DD-477), and USS Porcupine were hit. The SS Francisco Morozan was damaged when kamikaze plane exploded over the ship after it is shot down by US Navy plane.

On January 4, 1945, just South of Mindoro, a Japanese kamikaze plane crashed into the Lewis L. Dyche. The cargo of ammunition exploded and the ship disintegrated, killing all crew members. Killed were the 28-man US Navy Armed Guard and 43 the merchant marines. The explosion was so large that the ship's debris damaged other ships nearby, including the oil tanker USS Pecos and the minelayer USS Monadnock.

== See also ==
- Allied technological cooperation during World War II
- List of Liberty ships
- Type C1 ship
- Type C2 ship
- Victory ship
- U.S. Merchant Marine Academy
