= SS Benjamin Chew =

Liberty ship of WWII

History

United States
- Name: Benjamin Chew
- Namesake: Benjamin Chew
- Owner: War Shipping Administration (WSA)
- Operator: Calmar Steamship Corp.
- Ordered: as type (EC2-S-C1) hull, MCE hull 58
- Awarded: 14 March 1941
- Builder: Bethlehem-Fairfield Shipyard, Baltimore, Maryland
- Cost: $1,075,732
- Yard number: 2045
- Way number: 7
- Laid down: 15 June 1942
- Launched: 10 August 1942
- Sponsored by: Mrs. Andrew L. Jorgensen
- Completed: 21 August 1942
- Refit: converted to EC2-S-8a, July 1956
- Identification: Call sign: KGJP
- Fate: Laid up in the National Defense Reserve Fleet, Astoria, Oregon, 20 May 1948; Laid up in the National Defense Reserve Fleet, Wilmington, North Carolina, 2 June 1952; Transferred to the Military Sea Transportation Service, 22 August 1956

United States
- Name: Benjamin Chew
- Owner: Military Sea Transportation Service
- Operator: United States Lines Co.
- Cost: $1,079,000 (refit cost)
- Acquired: 22 August 1956
- In service: 22 August 1956
- Out of service: 31 October 1958
- Fate: Laid up in the James River Reserve Fleet, Lee Hall, Virginia, 31 October 1958; Laid up in the National Defense Reserve Fleet, Mobile, Alabama, 21 July 1969; Sold for scrapping, 28 October 1971, withdrawn from fleet, 8 February 1972

General characteristics
- Class & type: Liberty ship; type EC2-S-C1, standard
- Type: EC2-S-8a (1956-) (refit)
- Tonnage: 10,865 LT DWT; 7,176 GRT
- Displacement: 3,380 long tons (3,434 t) (light); 14,245 long tons (14,474 t) (max)
- Length: 441 feet 6 inches (135 m) oa; 416 feet (127 m) pp; 427 feet (130 m) lwl
- Beam: 57 feet (17 m)
- Draft: 27 ft 9.25 in (8.4646 m)
- Installed power: 2 × Oil fired 450 °F (232 °C) boilers, operating at 220 psi (1,500 kPa); 2,500 hp (1,900 kW); 6,000 hp (4,500 kW) (refit)
- Propulsion: 1 × triple-expansion steam engine, (manufactured by General Machine Corp., Hamilton, Ohio) (removed in refit); 2 × Steam turbines (refit); 1 × Geared reduction drive (refit); 1 × screw propeller
- Speed: 11.5 knots (21.3 km/h; 13.2 mph); 15 kn (28 km/h; 17 mph) (refit trial)
- Capacity: 562,608 cubic feet (15,931 m^{3}) (grain); 499,573 cubic feet (14,146 m^{3}) (bale)
- Complement: 38–62 USMM; 21–40 USNAG
- Armament: Varied by ship; Bow-mounted 3-inch (76 mm)/50-caliber gun; Stern-mounted 4-inch (102 mm)/50-caliber gun; 2–8 × single 20-millimeter (0.79 in) Oerlikon anti-aircraft (AA) cannons and/or, 2–8 × 37-millimeter (1.46 in) M1 AA guns
- Notes: New cargo handling gear installed during refit

SS Benjamin Chew was a Liberty ship built in the United States during World War II. She was named after Benjamin Chew, a fifth-generation American, a Quaker-born legal scholar, a prominent and successful Philadelphia lawyer, head of the Pennsylvania Judiciary System under both Colony and Commonwealth, and Chief Justice of the Supreme Court of the Province of Pennsylvania. Chew was well known for his precision and brevity in making legal arguments as well as his excellent memory, judgment, and knowledge of statutory law. Chew lived and practiced law in Philadelphia, four blocks from Independence Hall, and provided pro bono his knowledge of substantive law to America's Founding Fathers during the creation of the United States Constitution and Bill of Rights.

== Construction ==
Benjamin Chew was laid down on 15 June 1942, under a Maritime Commission (MARCOM) contract, MCE hull 58, by the Bethlehem-Fairfield Shipyard, Baltimore, Maryland; she was sponsored by Mrs. Andrew L. Jorgensen, the wife of a yard employee, and was launched on 10 August 1942.

== History ==
She was allocated to Calmar Steamship Company, on 21 August 1942.

On 20 May 1948, she was laid up in the National Defense Reserve Fleet, Astoria, Oregon. On 2 June 1952, she was laid up in the National Defense Reserve Fleet, Wilmington, North Carolina. On 27 November 1954, she was withdrawn from the fleet for test conversion to steam turbine power. Ira S. Bushey & Sons, Inc., Brooklyn, New York, performed the conversion and she was reclassified EC2-S-8a. She had her reciprocating steam engine removed and a 6,000 shp (4,500 kW) steam turbine, connected directly to the ship's propeller through double reduction gear, installed. At trials she ran above the requested 15 kn (28 km/h; 17 mph).

After conversion she was transferred to the Military Sea Transportation Service (MSTS). She was operated by United States Lines under a bareboat charter on the same route as another converted Liberty ship, SS Thomas Nelson. Thomas Nelson had been refit with diesel engines in order to compare efficiencies of various conversions. While both ship were able to run on Bunker C fuel oil, Thomas Nelson consumed less than half of Benjamin Chew while traveling at a higher speed and carrying more cargo.

On 31 October 1958, she was laid up in the James River Reserve Fleet, Lee Hall, Virginia. She was removed from the fleet on 3 September 1966, for use by the MSTS. On 21 July 1969, she was laid up in the National Defense Reserve Fleet, Mobile, Alabama. She was sold for scrapping on 28 October 1971, to Union Minerals & Alloys Corp., along with three other ships, for $127,500. She was removed from the fleet, 8 February 1972.

== Bibliography ==
- "Bethlehem-Fairfield, Baltimore MD". www.ShipbuildingHistory.com. 14 August 2008.
- Maritime Administration. "Benjamin Chew". Ship History Database Vessel Status Card. U.S. Department of Transportation, Maritime Administration.
- Davies, James (May 2004). "Specifications (As-Built)" (PDF). p. 23.
- "SS Benjamin Chew".
- Liberty ship conversion and engine improvement program : cumulative report of progress as of November 1, 1957. 1 November 1957.
