= SS Richard Henry Lee =

Liberty ship of WWII

History

United States
- Name: Richard Henry Lee
- Namesake: Richard Henry Lee
- Owner: War Shipping Administration (WSA)
- Operator: Calmar Steamship Corporation
- Ordered: as type (EC2-S-C1) hull, MCE hull 18
- Awarded: 14 March 1941
- Builder: Bethlehem-Fairfield Shipyard, Baltimore, Maryland
- Cost: $1,397,852
- Yard number: 2005
- Way number: 5
- Laid down: 15 July 1941
- Launched: 6 December 1941
- Completed: 20 February 1942
- Identification: Call sign: KAXU
- Fate: Laid up in the National Defense Reserve Fleet, Beaumont, Texas, 6 July 1948; Sold for scrapping, 20 July 1965, withdrawn from fleet, 20 August 1965

General characteristics
- Class & type: Liberty ship; type EC2-S-C1, standard
- Tonnage: 10,865 LT DWT; 7,176 GRT
- Displacement: 3,380 long tons (3,434 t) (light); 14,245 long tons (14,474 t) (max)
- Length: 441 feet 6 inches (135 m) oa; 416 feet (127 m) pp; 427 feet (130 m) lwl
- Beam: 57 feet (17 m)
- Draft: 27 ft 9.25 in (8.4646 m)
- Installed power: 2 × Oil fired 450 °F (232 °C) boilers, operating at 220 psi (1,500 kPa); 2,500 hp (1,900 kW)
- Propulsion: 1 × triple-expansion steam engine, (manufactured by General Machinery Corp., Hamilton, Ohio); 1 × screw propeller
- Speed: 11.5 knots (21.3 km/h; 13.2 mph)
- Capacity: 562,608 cubic feet (15,931 m^{3}) (grain); 499,573 cubic feet (14,146 m^{3}) (bale)
- Complement: 38–62 USMM; 21–40 USNAG
- Armament: Varied by ship; Bow-mounted 3-inch (76 mm)/50-caliber gun; Stern-mounted 4-inch (102 mm)/50-caliber gun; 2–8 × single 20-millimeter (0.79 in) Oerlikon anti-aircraft (AA) cannons and/or, 2–8 × 37-millimeter (1.46 in) M1 AA guns

SS Richard Henry Lee was a Liberty ship built in the United States during World War II. She was named after Richard Henry Lee, an American statesman and Founding Father from Virginia best known for the June 1776 Lee Resolution, the motion in the Second Continental Congress calling for the colonies' independence from Great Britain leading to the United States Declaration of Independence, which he signed. He also served a one-year term as the President of the Continental Congress, was a signatory to the Articles of Confederation, and was a United States senator from Virginia, from 1789 to 1792, serving during part of that time as the second President pro tempore of the upper house.

== Construction ==
Richard Henry Lee was laid down on 15 July 1941, under a Maritime Commission (MARCOM) contract, MCE hull 18, by the Bethlehem-Fairfield Shipyard, Baltimore, Maryland; and was launched on 6 December 1941.

== History ==
The Richard Henry Lee was allocated to the Calmar Steamship Corporation, on 20 February 1942. On 6 July 1948, she was laid up in the National Defense Reserve Fleet, Beaumont, Texas. The vessel was later sold for scrapping on 20 July 1965, to Southern Scrap Material, for $45,179.79 and was removed from the fleet, 20 August in the same year.

== Bibliography ==
- "Bethlehem-Fairfield, Baltimore MD". www.ShipbuildingHistory.com. 14 August 2008.
- Maritime Administration. "Richard Henry Lee". Ship History Database Vessel Status Card. U.S. Department of Transportation, Maritime Administration.
- Davies, James (May 2004). "Specifications (As-Built)" (PDF). p. 23.
- "SS Richard Henry Lee".
