= SS Eleazar Wheelock =

Liberty ship of WWII

History

United States
- Name: Eleazar Wheelock
- Namesake: Eleazar Wheelock
- Owner: War Shipping Administration (WSA)
- Operator: Calmar Steamship Corp.
- Ordered: as type (EC2-S-C1) hull, MCE hull 38
- Awarded: 14 March 1941
- Builder: Bethlehem-Fairfield Shipyard, Baltimore, Maryland
- Cost: $1,066,058
- Yard number: 2025
- Way number: 2
- Laid down: 4 March 1942
- Launched: 11 May 1942
- Completed: 5 June 1942
- Identification: Call sign: KFDN
- Fate: Sold for scrapping, 10 August 1964

General characteristics
- Class & type: Liberty ship; type EC2-S-C1, standard
- Tonnage: 10,865 LT DWT; 7,176 GRT
- Displacement: 3,380 long tons (3,434 t) (light); 14,245 long tons (14,474 t) (max)
- Length: 441 feet 6 inches (135 m) oa; 416 feet (127 m) pp; 427 feet (130 m) lwl
- Beam: 57 feet (17 m)
- Draft: 27 ft 9.25 in (8.4646 m)
- Installed power: 2 × Oil fired 450 °F (232 °C) boilers, operating at 220 psi (1,500 kPa); 2,500 hp (1,900 kW)
- Propulsion: 1 × triple-expansion steam engine, (manufactured by Worthington Pump & Machinery Corp, Harrison, New Jersey); 1 × screw propeller
- Speed: 11.5 knots (21.3 km/h; 13.2 mph)
- Capacity: 562,608 cubic feet (15,931 m^{3}) (grain); 499,573 cubic feet (14,146 m^{3}) (bale)
- Complement: 38–62 USMM; 21–40 USNAG
- Armament: Varied by ship; Bow-mounted 3-inch (76 mm)/50-caliber gun; Stern-mounted 4-inch (102 mm)/50-caliber gun; 2–8 × single 20-millimeter (0.79 in) Oerlikon anti-aircraft (AA) cannons and/or, 2–8 × 37-millimeter (1.46 in) M1 AA guns

SS Eleazar Wheelock was a Liberty ship built in the United States during World War II. She was named after Eleazar Wheelock, an American Congregational minister, orator, and educator in Lebanon, Connecticut, for 35 years before founding Dartmouth College in New Hampshire. Before founding Dartmouth, Wheelock, in 1754, had founded and run the Moor's Charity School in Connecticut, to educate Native Americans.

== Construction ==
Eleazar Wheelock was laid down on 4 March 1942, under a Maritime Commission (MARCOM) contract, MCE hull 38, by the Bethlehem-Fairfield Shipyard, Baltimore, Maryland; and was launched on 11 May 1942.

== History ==
She was allocated to Calmar Steamship Corp., on 5 June 1942. On 24 September 1947, she was laid up in the National Defense Reserve Fleet, Wilmington, North Carolina. She was sold for scrapping on 10 August 1964, to Northern Metal Co.

== Bibliography ==
- "Bethlehem-Fairfield, Baltimore MD". www.ShipbuildingHistory.com. 14 August 2008.
- Maritime Administration. "Eleazar Wheelock". Ship History Database Vessel Status Card. U.S. Department of Transportation, Maritime Administration. Archived from the original on 25 February 2020.
- Davies, James (May 2004). "Specifications (As-Built)" (PDF). p. 23.
- "SS Eleazar Wheelock".
