= SS Thomas Nelson =

Liberty ship of WWII

History

United States
- Name: Thomas Nelson
- Namesake: Thomas Nelson
- Owner: War Shipping Administration (WSA)
- Operator: Calmar Steamship Corporation
- Ordered: as type (EC2-S-C1) hull, MCE hull 30
- Awarded: 14 March 1941
- Builder: Bethlehem-Fairfield Shipyard, Baltimore, Maryland
- Cost: $1,140,510
- Yard number: 2017
- Way number: 4
- Laid down: 10 December 1941
- Launched: 4 April 1942
- Completed: 12 May 1942
- Refit: converted to EC2-M-8b, 11 September 1956
- Identification: Call sign: KEWP
- Fate: Laid up in the National Defense Reserve Fleet, Mobile, Alabama, 29 December 1949; Laid up in the National Defense Reserve Fleet, Wilmington, North Carolina, 26 June 1952; Transferred to the Military Sea Transportation Service, 12 September 1956

United States
- Name: Thomas Nelson
- Owner: Military Sea Transportation Service
- Operator: United States Lines
- Cost: $3,035,000 (refit cost)
- Acquired: 12 September 1956
- In service: 12 September 1956
- Out of service: 17 June 1960
- Fate: Laid up in the James River Reserve Fleet, Lee Hall, Virginia, 17 June 1960; Sold for nontransportation use, 28 March 1972, withdrawn from fleet, 5 April 1972

General characteristics
- Class & type: Liberty ship; type EC2-S-C1, standard
- Type: EC2-M-8b (1956-) (refit)
- Tonnage: 10,865 LT DWT; 7,176 GRT
- Displacement: 3,380 long tons (3,434 t) (light); 14,245 long tons (14,474 t) (max)
- Length: 441 ft 6 in (134.57 m) oa; 467 ft 3 in (142.42 m) oa (refit)
- Beam: 57 feet (17 m)
- Draft: 27 ft 9.25 in (8.4646 m)
- Installed power: 2 × Oil fired 450 °F (232 °C) boilers, operating at 220 psi (1,500 kPa) (removed in refit); 2,500 hp (1,900 kW); 2 × Baldwin-Lima-Hamilton Diesel engines (refit); 6,000 hp (4,500 kW) (refit)
- Propulsion: 1 × triple-expansion steam engine, (manufactured by General Machinery Corp., Hamilton, Ohio) (removed in refit); 1 × Geared reduction drive (refit); 1 × screw propeller
- Speed: 11.5 knots (21.3 km/h; 13.2 mph); 17.5 kn (32.4 km/h; 20.1 mph) (refit trial)
- Capacity: 562,608 cubic feet (15,931 m^{3}) (grain); 499,573 cubic feet (14,146 m^{3}) (bale)
- Complement: 38–62 USMM; 21–40 USNAG
- Armament: Varied by ship; Bow-mounted 3-inch (76 mm)/50-caliber gun; Stern-mounted 4-inch (102 mm)/50-caliber gun; 2–8 × single 20-millimeter (0.79 in) Oerlikon anti-aircraft (AA) cannons and/or, 2–8 × 37-millimeter (1.46 in) M1 AA guns
- Notes: New cargo handling gear installed during refit

SS Thomas Nelson was a Liberty ship built in the United States during World War II. She was named after Thomas Nelson, an American planter, soldier, and statesman from Yorktown, Virginia. He represented Virginia in the Continental Congress and was its Governor in 1781. He is regarded as one of the Founding Fathers of the United States. He signed the United States Declaration of Independence as a member of the Virginia delegation and fought in the militia during the Siege of Yorktown.

== Construction ==
Thomas Nelson was laid down on 10 December 1941, under a Maritime Commission (MARCOM) contract, MCE hull 30, by the Bethlehem-Fairfield Shipyard, Baltimore, Maryland; and was launched on 4 April 1942.

== History ==
She was allocated to Calmar Steamship Corporation, on 12 May 1942.

On 12 November 1944, Thomas Nelson was one of the victims of a Kamikaze attack, at 11°11′N 125°05′E, near Leyte. A plane dropped a bomb then crashed into the after end of the ship. Two large explosions took place and fire broke out which could not be brought under control for two hours. The attack brought a frightful loss of life. Over 240 Army personnel were killed, wounded, or missing. Armed Guards also suffered casualties; three killed, two missing, and two wounded. But the Armed Guards continued to fight back at Japanese planes and, in fact, claimed the destruction of one plane on the afternoon of 12 November. In forty days the ship went through 241 air raids and alerts, destroyed two planes and helped bring down a third.

On 29 December 1949, she was laid up in the National Defense Reserve Fleet, Mobile, Alabama. On 26 June 1952, she was laid up in the National Defense Reserve Fleet, Wilmington, North Carolina. On 15 November 1956, she was withdrawn from the fleet for test conversion to diesel engine power. Bethlehem Steel, in Baltimore, performed the conversion and she was reclassified EC2-M-8b. Her hull was lengthened at the bow to 467 ft 3 in (142.42 m), and new Baldwin-Lima-Hamilton diesel engines, producing 3,000 hp (2,200 kW) each, were installed. At trials, in August 1956, she ran 17.5 kn (32.4 km/h; 20.1 mph), well above the requested 15 kn (28 km/h; 17 mph).

After conversion she was transferred to the Military Sea Transportation Service. She was operated by United States Lines under a bareboat charter on the same route as another converted Liberty ship, SS Benjamin Chew. Benjamin Chew had been refit with steam turbines in order to compare efficiencies of various conversions. While both ship were able to run on Bunker C fuel oil, Thomas Nelson consumed less than half of Benjamin Chew while traveling at a higher speed and carrying more cargo.

On 17 June 1960, she was laid up in the James River Reserve Fleet, Lee Hall, Virginia. She was sold for nontransportation use on 28 March 1972, to Buckley & Company, Inc., for $115,001. She was removed from the fleet, 5 April 1972.

Buckley & Company converted her to a dredger and pipe laying ship and renamed her Beverley M. She was laid up in Hoboken, New Jersey, in 1976, and scrapped in 1981.

== See also ==
- SS Jeremiah M. Daily

== Bibliography ==
- "Bethlehem-Fairfield, Baltimore MD". www.ShipbuildingHistory.com. 14 August 2008.
- Maritime Administration. "Thomas Nelson". Ship History Database Vessel Status Card. U.S. Department of Transportation, Maritime Administration.
- Davies, James (May 2004). "Specifications (As-Built)" (PDF). p. 23.
- "SS Thomas Nelson".
- "Liberty ship conversion and engine improvement program : cumulative report of progress as of November 1, 1957". 1 November 1957.
- "Battle of the Philippines". Dictionary of American Naval Fighting Ships. Navy Department, Naval History and Heritage Command. 4 June 2014. This article incorporates text from this source, which is in the public domain.
