= SS William Paca =

Liberty ship of WWII

History

United States
- Name: William Paca
- Namesake: William Paca
- Owner: War Shipping Administration (WSA)
- Operator: Calmar Steamship Corp.
- Ordered: as type (EC2-S-C1) hull, MCE hull 302
- Awarded: 1 May 1941
- Builder: Bethlehem-Fairfield Shipyard, Baltimore, Maryland
- Cost: $1,065,198
- Yard number: 2052
- Way number: 15
- Laid down: 13 December 1941
- Launched: 30 May 1942
- Sponsored by: Mrs. Carl Abel
- Completed: 19 June 1942
- Identification: Call sign: KFUZ
- Fate: Laid up in the National Defense Reserve Fleet, Mobile, Alabama, 17 November 1948; Sold for scrapping, 29 August 1969, withdrawn from fleet, 23 September 1969

General characteristics
- Class & type: Liberty ship; type EC2-S-C1, standard
- Tonnage: 10,865 LT DWT; 7,176 GRT
- Displacement: 3,380 long tons (3,434 t) (light); 14,245 long tons (14,474 t) (max)
- Length: 441 feet 6 inches (135 m) oa; 416 feet (127 m) pp; 427 feet (130 m) lwl
- Beam: 57 feet (17 m)
- Draft: 27 ft 9.25 in (8.4646 m)
- Installed power: 2 × Oil fired 450 °F (232 °C) boilers, operating at 220 psi (1,500 kPa); 2,500 hp (1,900 kW)
- Propulsion: 1 × triple-expansion steam engine, (manufactured by Worthington Pump & Machinery Corp, Harrison, New Jersey); 1 × screw propeller
- Speed: 11.5 knots (21.3 km/h; 13.2 mph)
- Capacity: 562,608 cubic feet (15,931 m^{3}) (grain); 499,573 cubic feet (14,146 m^{3}) (bale)
- Complement: 38–62 USMM; 21–40 USNAG
- Armament: Varied by ship; Bow-mounted 3-inch (76 mm)/50-caliber gun; Stern-mounted 4-inch (102 mm)/50-caliber gun; 2–8 × single 20-millimeter (0.79 in) Oerlikon anti-aircraft (AA) cannons and/or, 2–8 × 37-millimeter (1.46 in) M1 AA guns

SS William Paca was a Liberty ship built in the United States during World War II. She was named after William Paca, a signatory to the United States Declaration of Independence from Maryland, a delegate to the First Continental Congress and the Second Continental Congress from Maryland, Governor of Maryland and a United States district judge of the United States District Court for the District of Maryland.

== Construction ==
William Paca was laid down on 13 December 1941, under a Maritime Commission (MARCOM) contract, MCE hull 302, by the Bethlehem-Fairfield Shipyard, Baltimore, Maryland; she was sponsored by Mrs. Carl Abel, the wife of the Captain of the Port of Baltimore, and was launched on 30 May 1942.

== History ==
She was allocated to Calmar Steamship Corp., on 19 June 1942. On 17 November 1948, she was laid up in the National Defense Reserve Fleet, Mobile, Alabama. On 29 August 1969, she was sold for scrapping to Pinto Island Metals Co., for $40,600. She was removed from the fleet on 23 September 1969.

== Bibliography ==
- "Bethlehem-Fairfield, Baltimore MD". www.ShipbuildingHistory.com. 14 August 2008.
- Maritime Administration. "William Paca". Ship History Database Vessel Status Card. U.S. Department of Transportation, Maritime Administration.
- Davies, James (May 2004). "Specifications (As-Built)" (PDF). p. 23.
- "SS William Paca".
