= SS Pierce Butler =

Liberty ship of WWII

History

United States
- Name: Pierce Butler
- Namesake: Pierce Butler
- Owner: War Shipping Administration (WSA)
- Operator: Calmar Steamship Corp.
- Ordered: as type (EC2-S-C1) hull, MCE hull 306
- Awarded: 1 May 1941
- Builder: Bethlehem-Fairfield Shipyard, Baltimore, Maryland
- Cost: $1,077,718
- Yard number: 2056
- Way number: 16
- Laid down: 27 June 1942
- Launched: 18 August 1942
- Sponsored by: Mrs. P.D. Daly
- Completed: 27 August 1942
- Identification: Call sign: KFNL
- Fate: Sunk, 20 November 1942

General characteristics
- Class & type: Liberty ship; type EC2-S-C1, standard
- Tonnage: 10,865 LT DWT; 7,176 GRT
- Displacement: 3,380 long tons (3,434 t) (light); 14,245 long tons (14,474 t) (max)
- Length: 441 feet 6 inches (135 m) oa; 416 feet (127 m) pp; 427 feet (130 m) lwl
- Beam: 57 feet (17 m)
- Draft: 27 ft 9.25 in (8.4646 m)
- Installed power: 2 × Oil fired 450 °F (232 °C) boilers, operating at 220 psi (1,500 kPa); 2,500 hp (1,900 kW)
- Propulsion: 1 × triple-expansion steam engine, (manufactured by General Machinery Corp., Hamilton, Ohio); 1 × screw propeller
- Speed: 11.5 knots (21.3 km/h; 13.2 mph)
- Capacity: 562,608 cubic feet (15,931 m^{3}) (grain); 499,573 cubic feet (14,146 m^{3}) (bale)
- Complement: 38–62 USMM; 21–40 USNAG
- Armament: Varied by ship; Bow-mounted 3-inch (76 mm)/50-caliber gun; Stern-mounted 4-inch (102 mm)/50-caliber gun; 2–8 × single 20-millimeter (0.79 in) Oerlikon anti-aircraft (AA) cannons and/or, 2–8 × 37-millimeter (1.46 in) M1 AA guns

SS Pierce Butler was a Liberty ship built in the United States during World War II. She was named after Pierce Butler, a South Carolina, rice planter, slaveholder, politician, an officer in the American Revolutionary War, and one of the Founding Fathers of the United States. He served as a state legislator, a member of the Congress of the Confederation, a delegate to the 1787 Constitutional Convention, and a member of the United States Senate.

== Construction ==
Pierce Butler was laid down on 27 June 1942, under a Maritime Commission (MARCOM) contract, MCE hull 306, by the Bethlehem-Fairfield Shipyard, Baltimore, Maryland; she was sponsored by Mrs. P.D. Daly, the wife of a yard employee, and was launched on 18 August 1942.

== History ==
She was allocated to Calmar Steamship Corp., on 27 August 1942.

=== Sinking ===
Pierce Butler had set out from New York City for Suez, Egypt, with 8,900 LT (9,000 t) of general cargo. At 11:40, on the morning of 20 November 1942, while steaming unescorted in a nonevasive course at 11 kn (20 km/h; 13 mph), Pierce Butler was struck by two torpedoes fired from the German submarine U-177, at 29°40′S 36°35′E. Both torpedoes struck Pierce Butler on the starboard side, one struck hold #5, while the other struck forward of the engine room. The crew sent out a distress signal, which was answered, and returned fire at U-177. Eight rounds were fired from the bow mounted 3-inch (76 mm)/50 caliber gun and seven rounds from the stern mounted 4-inch (100 mm)/50 caliber gun in an effort to keep U-177 submerged. It took ten minutes to secure the engines so that the crew of eight officers, 33 crewmen, and 21 Armed guards could abandon the ship in the four lifeboats. Pierce Butler sank at the stern at 12:10. The crew of U-177 questioned Pierce Butler's third mate and offered to send out a distress signal. The entire crew of 62 were rescued after about 20 hours when HMS Fortune picked them up and landed them at Durban, South Africa.

== Bibliography ==
- "Bethlehem-Fairfield, Baltimore MD". www.ShipbuildingHistory.com. 14 August 2008.
- Maritime Administration. "Pierce Butler". Ship History Database Vessel Status Card. U.S. Department of Transportation, Maritime Administration.
- Davies, James (May 2004). "Specifications (As-Built)" (PDF). p. 23.
- "SS Pierce Butler".
- "Pierce Butler".
