= Lewis Lindsay Dyche =

American naturalist (1857–1915)

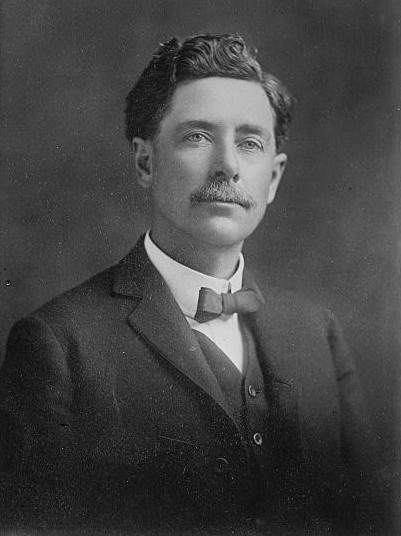
- Lewis Lindsay Dyche
- Born: March 20, 1857; Berkeley Springs, Virginia
- Died: January 20, 1915 (aged 57); Topeka, Kansas
- Occupations: Naturalist, Taxidermist
- Notable work: Panorama of North American Plants and Animals

Lewis Lindsay Dyche (March 20, 1857 – January 20, 1915) was a naturalist. He was the creator of Panorama of North American Plants and Animals, which was featured in the Kansas Pavilion at the 1893 World's Columbian Exposition. His taxidermy is housed at The University of Kansas' (KU) Natural History Museum in Lawrence, Kansas. Also at KU is the U.S. Army's lone survivor on the field of the Battle of Little Big Horn. He was a Horse Comanche, which the Army asked Dyche to stuff for their display.

== Early life ==
Dyche was born in Berkeley Springs, West Virginia (then in Virginia).

He died in Topeka, Kansas on January 20, 1915.

Dyche gave his name to the Liberty ship SS Lewis L. Dyche

== Works ==
- Edwords, Clarence E. Camp-fires of a naturalist : the story of fourteen expeditions after North American mammals : from the field notes of Lewis Lindsay Dyche. New York : Appleton, 1893.
- Sharp, William and Peggy Sullivan. The dashing Kansan : Lewis Lindsay Dyche : the amazing adventures of a nineteenth-century naturalist and explorer. Kansas City, Mo. : Harrow Books in association with the Museum of Natural History, the University of Kansas, c1990.

== See also ==
- University of Kansas Natural History Museum
