= William Donner =

American steel magnate (1864–1953)

- Born: May 21, 1864; Columbus, Indiana
- Died: November 3, 1953 (aged 89); Montreal
- Occupations: Businessman and philanthropist

William Henry Donner (May 21, 1864 – November 3, 1953) was an American businessman and philanthropist, who built a fortune in tin plate and steel. His father was an immigrant from Germany. He graduated from Hanover College in 1887. His academic philanthropy led to the creation of the five chairs and the title of Donner Professor.

== Early life and career ==
Donner was born in Columbus, Indiana. Early in adulthood, he managed the family-owned grain mill, (Note: F. Donner & Sons 39.20391°N 85.91688°W (relocated to) 39.20376°N 85.92158°W Business was incorporated as Donner Milling Co. in January 1893 and was dissolved Jan 8, 1904. Father: Frederick C. Donner (May 28, 1836 Stuttgart - Oct 16, 1923 Columbus)) and in his twenties invested in Indiana natural gas and real estate. He founded the National Tin Plate Company, originally based in North Anderson, Indiana, and obtained a patent for an innovation in tin plate rolling processes.

Donner then shifted his energies from Indiana to the Monongahela Valley of southwestern Pennsylvania. In 1897, National Tin Plate was the first employer in the newly created community of Monessen, Pennsylvania. The town's main street was named "Donner Avenue" in his honor.

Donner then sold his company and used the proceeds to create Union Steel Company (later American Steel and Wire Company), in the new community of Donora, Pennsylvania, in 1899–1900. The "Don" in "Donora" was in recognition of William Donner's key role in the founding of that community. In creating Union Steel Company, Donner received financial backing from Henry Clay Frick, Andrew W. Mellon, and Richard B. Mellon, in addition to Donner's own funds. The town was the site of the Donora Smog of 1948.

After selling his Donora-based milling company in 1903, with a fortune of $5,000,000 he was considered among the richest people in the country. Donner became president of Cambria Steel Company and served as chairman of the board of the Pennsylvania Steel Company. In 1915 he created the Buffalo-based Donner Steel Company, which he sold in 1929.

In 1914, a new cargo ship (at 524 feet long and 9,600 tons one of the largest on the Great Lakes at the time), the William H. Donner, was named in his honor at the Great Lakes Engineering Works and shipyard in Ashtabula, Ohio. Still holding the name, it had functioned since 1969 as a stationary crane ship and cargo transfer hull in Marinette, Wisconsin. It was owned by K.K. Integrated Logistics. Her final retirement came in 2015; as of March, 2016, the 102-year-old vessel had been moved and is now in the Menominee river on the Michigan side awaiting scrapping. The ship's pilot house and superstructure had been removed several years earlier.

== Later life ==
Donner's son, Joseph, died in 1929, from cancer. In 1932, Donner turned his attention to philanthropy, with a special interest in cancer research. He founded two notable foundations that are still in operation today, the William H. Donner Foundation in the United States, and the Donner Canadian Foundation in Canada.

The Donner Center was donated to the City of Columbus, Indiana, in 1947 by William H. Donner, and sits in Donner Park, Columbus' oldest park. For 70 years, the Columbus Parks and Recreation administrative facility has served as the home for youth and adult programs, community events, family reunions, wedding receptions and meeting space for community clubs and local businesses.

== Legacy ==
In 1958, the William H. Donner Foundation used $2.5 million to fund five chairs in science at MIT, Harvard, Yale, Princeton and the University of Pennsylvania thus creating the title of Donner Professor. The Donner Building was funded by W H Donner kin 1947-48 for medical research at McGill University. It is now part of the Dentistry faculty.

The Donner Canadian Foundation was established in 1950, and for 43 years was a typical, uncontroversial Canadian charitable fund.

In 1993, the conservative American Donner heirs who control the foundation changed its primary focus to that of supporting conservative research.

From 1993 to 1999, under the leadership of executive directors Devon Gaffney Cross and then Patrick Luciani, the foundation provided the seed money to start several conservative Canadian think-tanks and publications, and became the "lifeblood of conservative research" in Canada.

In 1999, the American Donner heirs who control the foundation began donating more of its money to land and wildlife conservation, international development, medical research, and the arts, reducing funding of conservative research.

== Donner Steel Company ==
The New York State Steel Company was incorporated in New York on Sep 13, 1905 with a capital of $1,000,000 by Spencer Kellogg (Note: Jun 16, 1851 Galway - Nov 14, 1922 Buffalo of Spencer Kellogg & Sons, Inc.) and associates. On Dec 1, 1905 construction began of a greenfield steel plant (at 42.85973°N 78.84142°W; (Note: 1909 map) where the Tesla New York Gigafactory was opened in 2017) consisting of two 200-ton Talbot open hearth furnaces (100,000-120,000tpa) and a 36-inch blooming mill. In July 1906 authorized capital was increased to $2,500,000 ($1,500,000 issued) and a mortgage securing a $5,000,000 5% 30-year bond issue was made and $3 million of the bonds were issued. The plant on the 27-acre property was completed in April 1907 and represented an investment of $7,500,000. The first OH heat was tapped April 19. The company was in receivership in record time on Nov 6, 1907. A new leadership was put in place by stockholders in a January 1909 meeting, Frederick N. Beegle became president, Spencer Kellogg remained involved as a director. Work on the 450tpd No. 1 blast furnace was begun in Nov 1906, it was blown in after much delay on July 14, 1909. William H. Love was elected president on Jan 20, 1911 and died unexpectedly Nov 17, 1911. The company was put in receivership again on Apr 3, 1913. The plant was in foreclosure proceedings since Aug 5, 1913 with $3,850,000 of the bonds outstanding and on May 28, 1914, sold to a committee representing the bondholders. The sale of the plant to William Donner was announced Nov 18, 1915.

The Donner Steel Co. was incorporated in New York on Dec 8, 1915. Donner Steel took over 65 acres of land, 1 blast furnace, 3 open hearth furnaces and a blooming mill. During 1916, another 2.38 acres were secured and work was initiated on an ore dock, 1 new blast furnace, 7 new open hearth furnaces and finishing departments designed to process the entire output of steel, to wit: an 84-inch plate mill, a continuous billet mill, a 14-inch, 10-inch and 8-inch merchant mill, an axle and forge plant - all driven electrically. The planned byproduct coke oven plant however was delayed and none of the major improvement projects were finished during 1916.

A total of $4 million of new stock was authorized by shareholders on Dec 26, 1916, all of it and $2.5 million of previously authorized bonds were to be issued to finance the massive expansion program.

Long term liabilities outstanding
	Dec 31, 1916	to be increased to
7% preferred	$2,500,000	$6,000,000
common	$2,500,000	$3,000,000
5% 20-year bonds	$2,500,000	$5,000,000

The plant was put in operation in January 1916, the two Talbot furnaces were however shut down again and converted to stationary type open hearth furnaces and again started in March. The second blast furnace was blown in on Aug 22, 1917. 6 of 7 new open hearth furnaces were put in operation in March, April, May, July, August and November 1917.

In October 1916 the Tonawanda Iron & Steel Co. (Note: Organized by William A. Rogers of the Rogers-Brown Iron Co., who was also president.) plant (Note: 43.03714°N 78.88718°W) in North Tonawanda was leased for 3 years with an option to purchase. The two Niagara furnaces (Note: "A" furnace was built in 1873-74 by the Niagara River Iron Co. and was leased from the original owners in 1899 after having been idle for 12 years. It was rebuilt in 1890-91, "B" furnace was blown in on Nov 4, 1896 (president-elect William McKinley one day after winning the election turned it on via telegraph wire from his home in Canton; combined capacity in 1916 was 180,000tpa.) had been idle for 2 years. The purchase option was exercised in May 1919, albeit the furnaces were idle from 1919 to 1923. The American Radiator Company, largest individual consumer of pig iron in the Buffalo area, purchased the plant from Donner and incorporated the Tonawanda Iron Co. in New York on Mar 27, 1923 to act as its operating subsidiary and to begin a complete overhaul of the two 300tpd furnaces. In 1958 the company was merged with its parent company, the American Radiator and Standard Sanitary Corporation.

Donner Steel Company owned 50% of the Donner-Hanna Coke Corporation, which began operations late in 1920.

An experimental electrically heated soaking pit was put in operation in 1924. (Note: This heating method has the benefit of reducing scale production. The pit was of 150kw capacity, held 2 ingots of 6,800-7,400 pounds and required 80.4kwh/ton to raise ingot temperature from 1,660°F to 2,316°F (typical charge and discharge temperatures).)

In December 1929, Donner absorbed the Witherow Steel Co. by merger. The combine had total assets of $34,000,000. (Note: Donner issued $5,022,000 of its new 6% preferred stock and gave one share for each share of Witherow 5% 1st preferred, gave 1.1 shares for each of Witherow 7% 2nd preferred, gave 0.42 for each Witherow common share and also gave 0.74 Donner common shares for each Witherow common share. Donner common stock was increased from 570,000 to 830,220 of no par value.)

Donner die ind Montreal, Canada.
