= SS Grace Abbott =

Liberty ship of WWII

History

United States
- Name: Grace Abbott
- Namesake: Grace Abbott
- Owner: War Shipping Administration (WSA)
- Operator: Calmar Steamship Corp.
- Ordered: as type (EC2-S-C1) hull, MCE hull 919
- Awarded: 1 January 1942
- Builder: Bethlehem-Fairfield Shipyard, Baltimore, Maryland
- Cost: $1,053,202
- Yard number: 2069
- Way number: 14
- Laid down: 29 August 1942
- Launched: 10 October 1942
- Sponsored by: Mrs. J.E. Schmelzer
- Completed: 17 October 1942
- Identification: Call sign: KHLC
- Fate: Laid up in National Defense Reserve Fleet, Astoria, Oregon, 5 December 1946; Sold for scrapping, 14 August 1967, removed from fleet, 6 September 1967

General characteristics
- Class & type: Liberty ship; type EC2-S-C1, standard
- Tonnage: 10,865 LT DWT; 7,176 GRT
- Displacement: 3,380 long tons (3,434 t) (light); 14,245 long tons (14,474 t) (max)
- Length: 441 feet 6 inches (135 m) oa; 416 feet (127 m) pp; 427 feet (130 m) lwl
- Beam: 57 feet (17 m)
- Draft: 27 ft 9.25 in (8.4646 m)
- Installed power: 2 × Oil fired 450 °F (232 °C) boilers, operating at 220 psi (1,500 kPa); 2,500 hp (1,900 kW)
- Propulsion: 1 × triple-expansion steam engine, (manufactured by General Machinery Corp., Hamilton, Ohio); 1 × screw propeller
- Speed: 11.5 knots (21.3 km/h; 13.2 mph)
- Capacity: 562,608 cubic feet (15,931 m^{3}) (grain); 499,573 cubic feet (14,146 m^{3}) (bale)
- Complement: 38–62 USMM; 21–40 USNAG
- Armament: Varied by ship; Bow-mounted 3-inch (76 mm)/50-caliber gun; Stern-mounted 4-inch (102 mm)/50-caliber gun; 2–8 × single 20-millimeter (0.79 in) Oerlikon anti-aircraft (AA) cannons and/or, 2–8 × 37-millimeter (1.46 in) M1 AA guns

SS Grace Abbott was a Liberty ship built in the United States during World War II. She was named after Grace Abbott, an American social worker who specifically worked in improving the rights of immigrants and advancing child welfare, especially the regulation of child labor.

== Construction ==
Grace Abbott was laid down on 29 August 1942, under a Maritime Commission (MARCOM) contract, MCE hull 919, by the Bethlehem-Fairfield Shipyard, Baltimore, Maryland; she was sponsored by Mrs. J.E. Schmelzer, the wife of the technical assistant to the vice chairman of MARCOM, and was launched on 10 October 1942.

== History ==
She was allocated to Calmar Steamship Corp., on 17 October 1942. On 5 December 1946, she was laid up in the National Defense Reserve Fleet, Astoria, Oregon. On 14 August 1967, she was sold for scrapping to American Ship Dismantlers, Inc., for $47,500. She was removed from the fleet on 6 September 1967.

== Bibliography ==
- "Bethlehem-Fairfield, Baltimore MD". www.ShipbuildingHistory.com. 14 August 2008.
- Maritime Administration. "Grace Abbott". Ship History Database Vessel Status Card. U.S. Department of Transportation, Maritime Administration.
- Davies, James (May 2004). "Specifications (As-Built)" (PDF). p. 23.
- "SS Grace Abbott".
