= SS William H. Donner =

Ship built in 1914

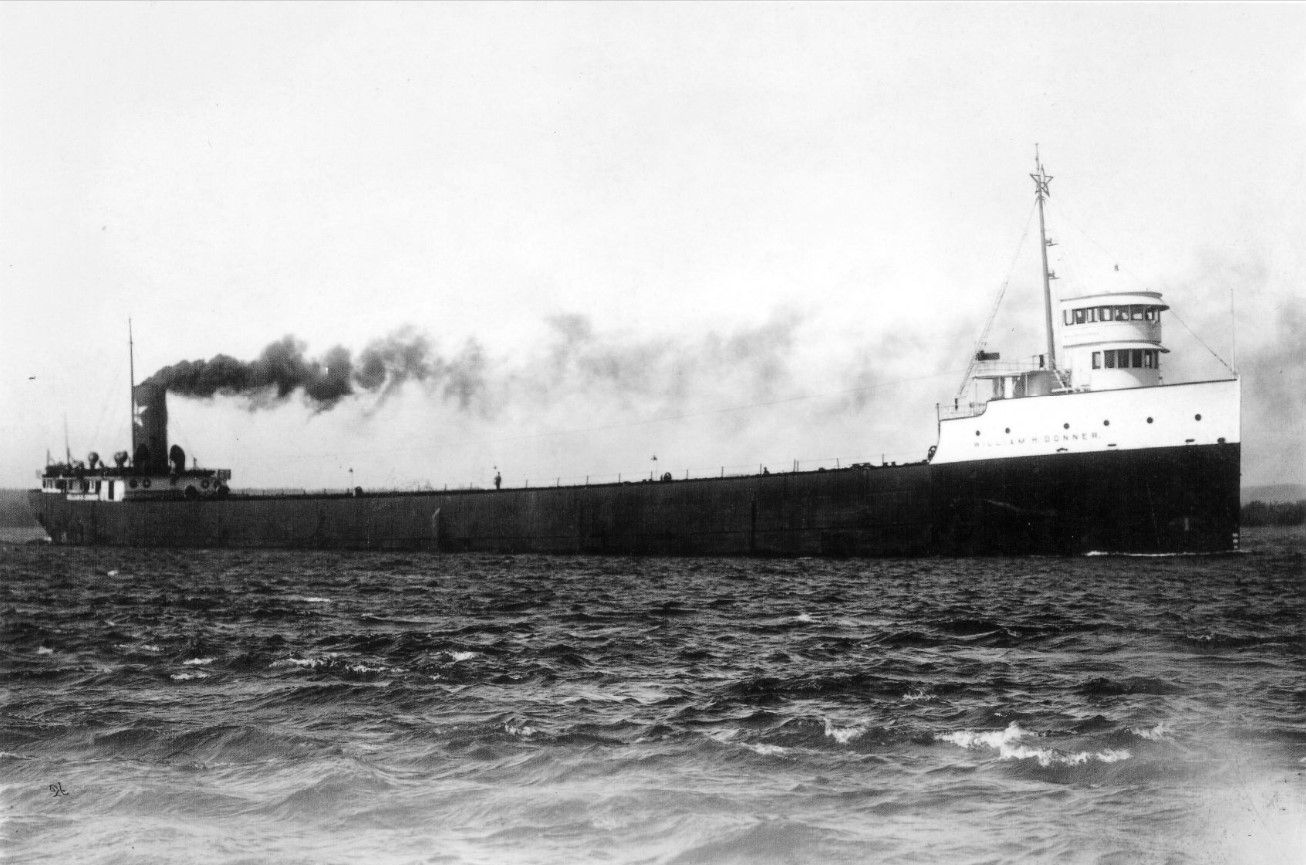
- An early photograph of the William H. Donner

History

United States
- Name: William H. Donner
- Namesake: William Donner
- Operator: Mahoning Steamship Company 1914-1929; Bethlehem Transportation Company 1929-1970; Miller Compressing Company 1970-1992; K & K Warehousing 1992-2018
- Port of registry: United States, Fairport, Ohio
- Builder: Great Lakes Engineering Works, Ashtabula, Ohio
- Yard number: 134
- Launched: May 7, 1914
- In service: July 7, 1914
- Out of service: 2018
- Identification: IMO number: 5390682; Callsign: WB4522
- Fate: Scrapped in 2021
- Notes: The Donner was built to replace the Charles S. Price which was lost in the Great Lakes Storm of 1913

General characteristics
- Tonnage: 6,311 gross; 4,843 net
- Length: 524 ft (160 m)
- Beam: 54 ft (16 m)
- Height: 30 ft (9.1 m)
- Installed power: 2× Scotch marine boilers
- Propulsion: 1,900 horsepower triple expansion steam engine

The William H. Donner was an American Great Lakes freighter that was built in 1914 by the Great Lakes Engineering Works of Ashtabula, Ohio, for service on the Great Lakes. She was used to transport bulk cargoes such as iron ore, coal, grain and occasionally limestone. She operated from 1914 as a bulk carrier to 1970, when she was converted to a floating crane ship with two cranes. In order to facilitate better maintenance, most of the ship's superstructure was eventually removed. It remained in service until 2016, when it was deemed obsolete. In 2020, the hull was sold for scrap. It was towed on December 17 from Marinette, Wisconsin, to the Purvis Scrap Yard in Sault Ste. Marie, Ontario, Ontario, Canada above the Soo Locks. The dismantling process most likely began sometime in early 2021, marking the end of the 107 year old vessel.

== History ==
The Donner was launched on May 7, 1914, as hull number #134. She had a length of 524-feet, a beam of 54-feet, and a height of 30-feet. She was built using the Isherwood System of longitudinal construction of ships, powered by a 1,900 horsepower triple expansion steam engine fueled by two coal-fired Scotch marine boilers. She had the official number U.S. #212354. She was commissioned by the Mahonig Steamship Company ( M.A. Hanna & Co., Mgr.) of Cleveland, Ohio. Her homeport was Fairport, Ohio. She entered service on July 7, 1914, clearing Ecorse, Michigan, bound for Cleveland, Ohio.

In 1929 the Donner was transferred to the Bethlehem Transportation Corporation's Ore Steamship Company (H.K. Oakes, Mgr.) of Cleveland. In 1955 she was re-registered to Wilmington, Delaware. In 1956 she was converted to a crane ship with two revolving cranes by the American Ship Building Company of Toledo, Ohio.

In 1970 the Donner was sold to the Miller Compressing Company of Milwaukee, Wisconsin, for use as a freight transfer vessel at Milwaukee. In 1992 she was sold to K & K Warehousing and towed to Menominee, Michigan, then later to Marinette, Wisconsin, to again serve as a freight transfer vessel.

In 2002 the Donner's pilothouse was removed. Her final retirement came in March 2016 - after 102 years of service - when she was towed to the Menominee River and moored to await scrapping. The scrap tow was conducted in December 2020.
