= SS Hagerstown Victory =

Victory ship of the United States

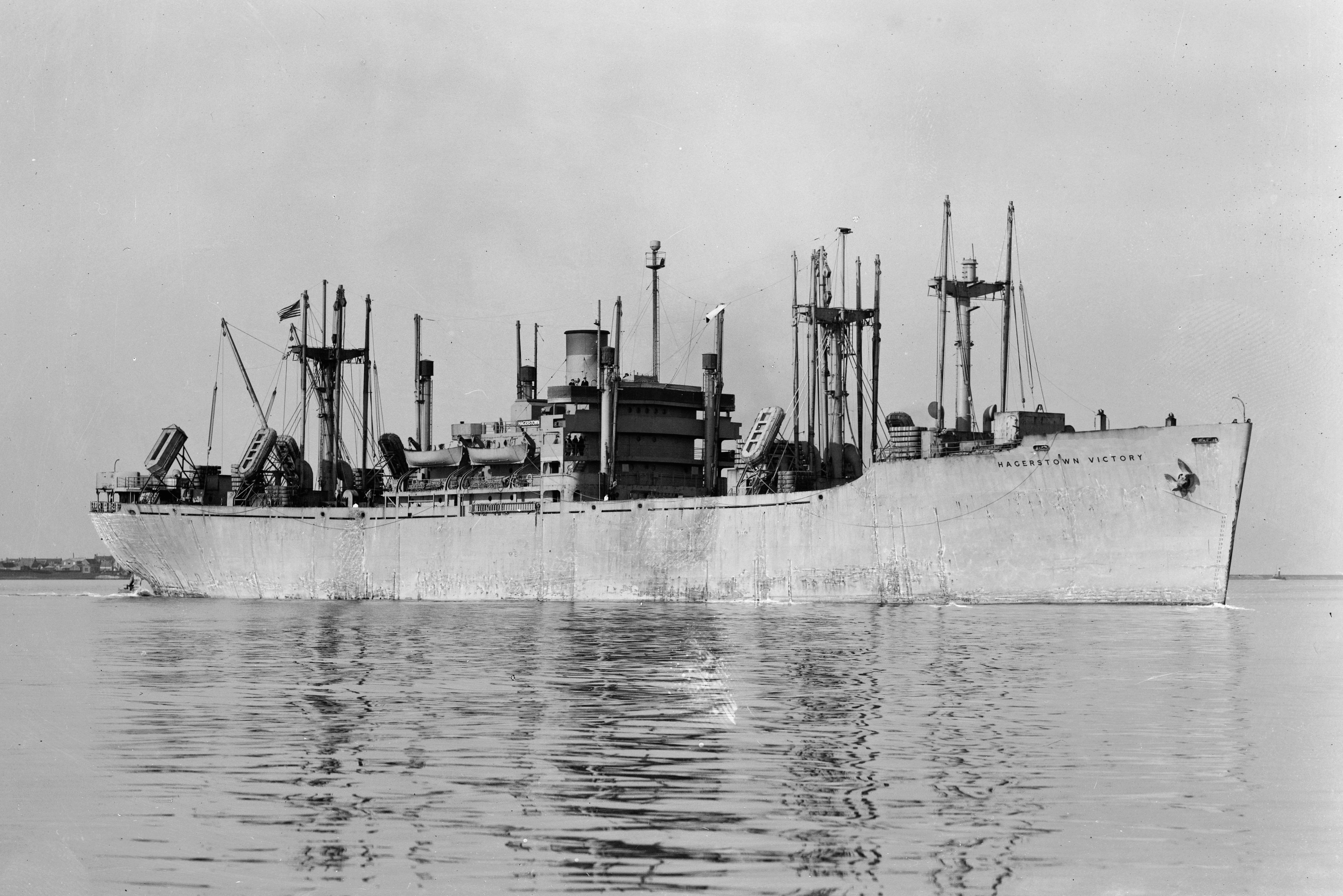
- Hagerstown Victory on the river Scheldt

History

United States
- Name: Hagerstown Victory
- Namesake: City of Hagerstown, Maryland
- Owner: War Shipping Administration
- Operator: Calmar Steamship Company
- Builder: Bethlehem Shipbuilding Corporation
- Yard number: 2448
- Laid down: December 19, 1944
- Launched: February 13, 1945
- Completed: March 13, 1945
- Identification: Hull 634; IMO number: 5139715; Callsign: ANHS
- Fate: Sold to private use, sank 1970 in typhoon.

General characteristics
- Class & type: VC2-S-AP3 Victory ship
- Tonnage: 7612 GRT, 4,553 NRT
- Displacement: 15,200 tons
- Length: 455 ft (139 m)
- Beam: 62 ft (19 m)
- Draft: 28 ft (8.5 m)
- Installed power: 8,500 shp (6,300 kW)
- Propulsion: HP & LP turbines geared to a single 20.5-foot (6.2 m) propeller
- Speed: 16.5 knots (30.6 km/h; 19.0 mph)
- Boats & landing craft carried: 4 Lifeboats
- Complement: 62 Merchant Marine and 28 U.S. Navy Armed Guards
- Armament: 1 × 5-inch (127 mm)/38 caliber gun; 1 × 3-inch (76 mm)/50 caliber gun; 8 × 20 mm Oerlikon (as Victory ship only)

SS Hagerstown Victory was a Victory ship-based troop transport built for the U.S. Army Transportation Corps (USAT) late in World War II under the Emergency Shipbuilding program. It saw service in the European Theater of Operations during 1945 and in the immediate post-war period repatriating U.S. troops. Hagerstown Victory was one of 97 cargo Victory ships converted to a troopship.

Hagerstown Victory was one of many of the new 10,500-ton class ships known as Victory ships. Victory ships were designed to replace the earlier Liberty ships, which were intended to be used just for World War II. Victory ships, on the other hand, were designed to last longer and serve the U.S. Navy after the war. The Victory ship differed from a Liberty ship in that they were faster, longer, wider, taller, had a thinner stack set farther toward the superstructure and had a long raised forecastle.

== History ==
=== Construction and wartime operation ===
Hagerstown Victory was laid down on 19 December 1944, as a U.S. Maritime Commission (MARCOM) Type C2 ship-based VC2-S-AP2 with hull No. 634. She was built by Bethlehem Shipbuilding Corporation of Baltimore, Maryland and was launched on 13 February 1945, for the War Shipping Administration. Later, she was converted into a dedicated troopship. She was operated by the civilian company, Calmar Steamship Company. She was armed with a 5-inch (127 mm) stern gun for use against submarines and surface ships, and a bow-mounted 3-inch (76 mm) gun and eight 20 mm cannons for use against aircraft.

As a cargo ship, she delivered goods and war supplies to Gibraltar, Istanbul, Odesa in Ukraine, Marseille in France and Oran in Algeria. In October 1945, she was converted to a troopship allocated to the U.S. Army Transportation Corps (USAT). Hagerstown Victory was crewed by U.S. Merchant Marines, protected by a contingent of U.S. Navy Armed Guards, and had a complement of USAT (Water Division) aboard for troop administration. She was able to transport up to 1,500 troops to and from Europe. As part of Operation Magic Carpet, she took U.S. troops home from so-called Cigarette Camps. Her cargo holds were converted to bunk beds and hammocks stacked three high for hot bunking. The cargo holds had mess halls and exercise places added. After the war, in early 1946, she was used to take German and Italian POWs from the U.S. to Le Havre, France, and Antwerp, Belgium.

== Post-war use ==
On 15 June 1946, Hagerstown Victory was laid up in the reserve fleet at the James River in Virginia, as part of the National Defense Reserve Fleet. In early 1967, she was put back in service and operated by the Oceanic Ore Carriers of New York to supply troops for the Vietnam War. In late 1967, she was sold to Chatham Shipping Corporation of Wilmington, Delaware, and renamed SS Chatham. In 1969, she was sold to the Resolute Marine Associates Ltd. of Wilmington. She was seized by U.S. Marshals and sold on 23 May 1969, to Windjammer Shipping Inc. of Wilmington. She was then renamed Windjammer Janeen.

In 1970, she was sold to Trans World Shipping Ltd. of Panama and renamed SS Julep. On 23 November 1970, she sank in Typhoon Patsy at 17°30′N 119°10′E, off the coast of Luzon, while steaming from Taiwan-Formosa to the Philippines. An SOS distress call brought three ships which were able to save 22 of the crew, but 9 crewmen were not found.

== Sources ==
- Sawyer, L.A. and W.H. Mitchell. Victory ships and tankers: The history of the ‘Victory’ type cargo ships and of the tankers built in the United States of America during World War II, Cornell Maritime Press, 1974, 0-87033-182-5.
- United States Maritime Commission:
- Victory Cargo Ships
