= Calmar Steamship Company =

Subsidiary of Bethlehem Steel (1927–1976)

- Industry: Shipping
- Founded: 1927 New York City, United States
- Defunct: 1976
- Parent: Bethlehem Steel

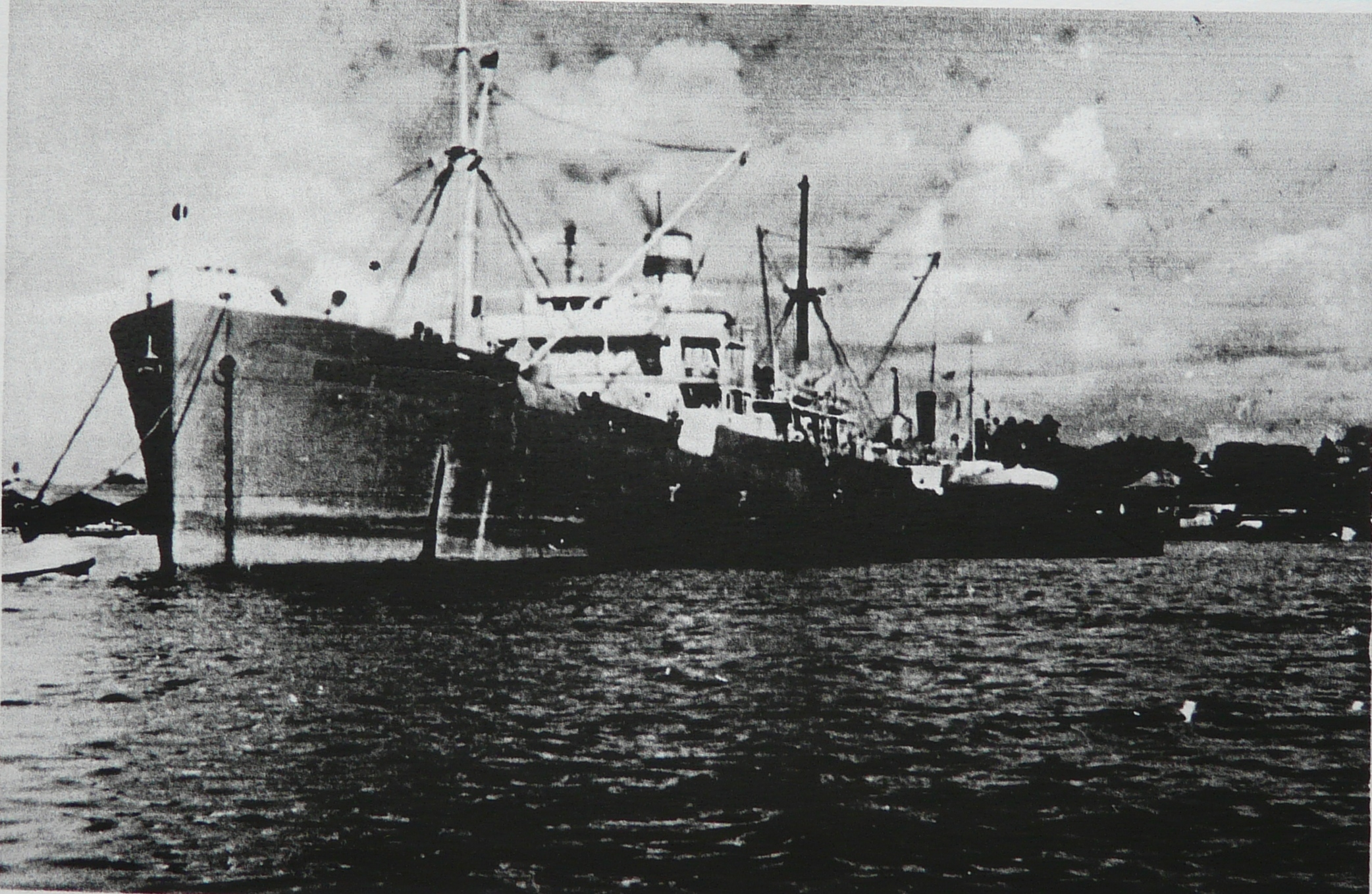
SS Portmar's sister ship, Circinus

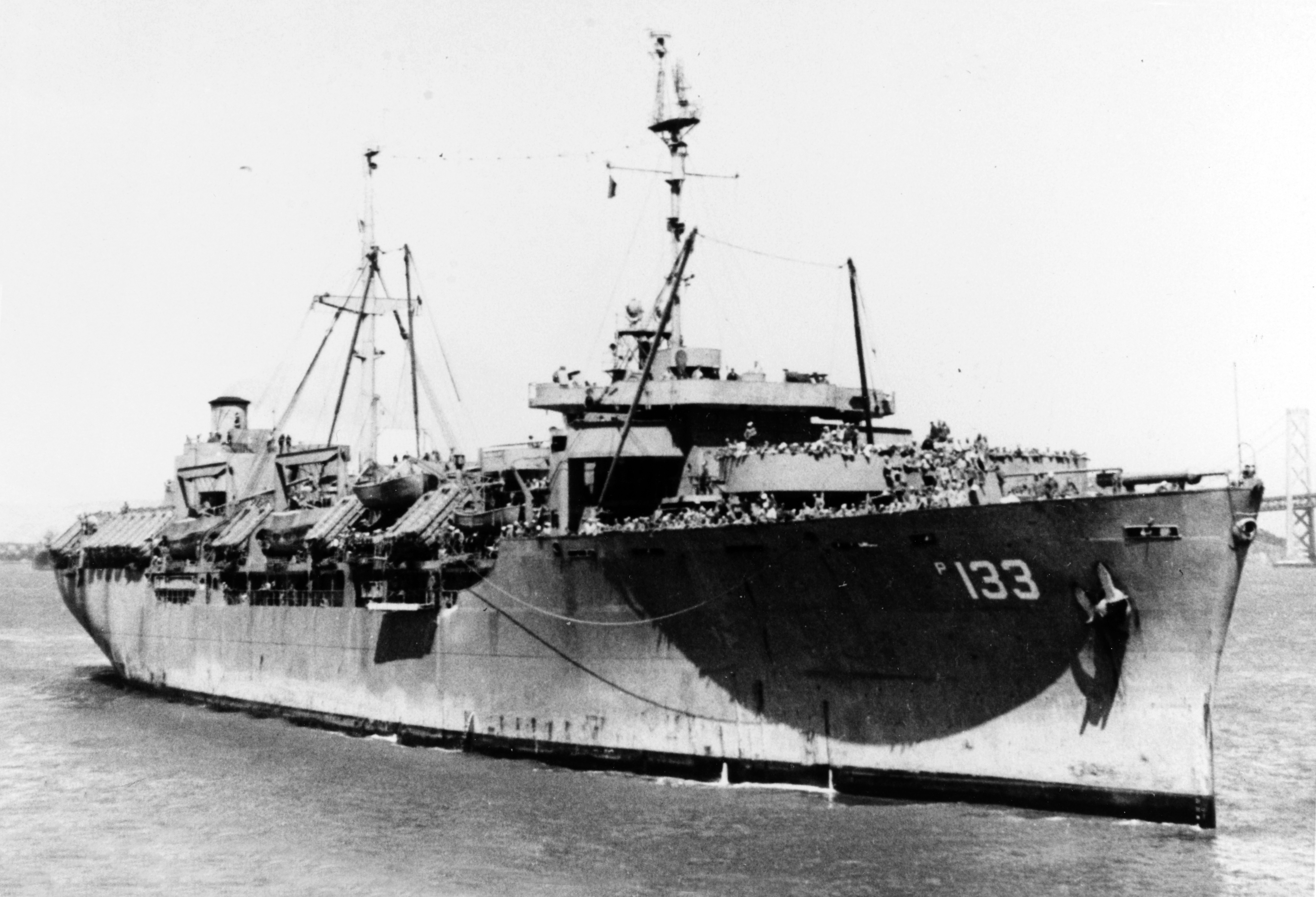
SS Calmar a Type C4-class ship

Calmar Steamship Company was a wholly-owned subsidiary of the Bethlehem Steel founded in New York City in 1927. Bethlehem Steel Company founded Calmar Steamship Company and other steamship companies after finding general shipping companies could not meet the company's needs in a timely manner. At the time Bethlehem Steel Company was the second-largest steelmaker in the United States and the world, only behind U.S. Steel. Calmar Steamship Company shipped Bethlehem Steel Company products from the Atlantic coast to the Pacific coast. On the return trip, Calmar Steamship Company would bring lumber products from the Pacific coast to the Atlantic coast. Calmar Steamship Company closed in 1976, as United States steel manufacture declined in the 1960s.

== Ships ==
- Ships:
- SS Portmar a steam cargo ship built in 1919
- SS Corvus a steam cargo ship built in 1919 by Columbia River Shipbuilding Company
- Alamar, a steam cargo ship built in 1919
- SS Circinus a steam cargo ship built in 1919
- SS Oakmar sunk by U-71 on March 20, 1942, off Virginia
- Calmar (1) a Type C4-class ship
  - Liberty ships that became Calmar ships:
- Marymar, was SS Frederick H. Baetjer
- Alamar (2), was Samuel F. B. Morse (2)
- Massmar, was Alexander V. Fraser
- Flomar, was Arlie Clark
- Seamar, was George M. Verity
- Kemmar, was George R. Holmes
- Calmar was Vincent Harrington
- Portmar, was Joseph B. Eastman
- Pennmar, was William S. Baer
- Yorkmar, was Walter Kidde
- Lomar, was Morris Sigman
- Texmar, was Harold O. Wilson

== World War II ==
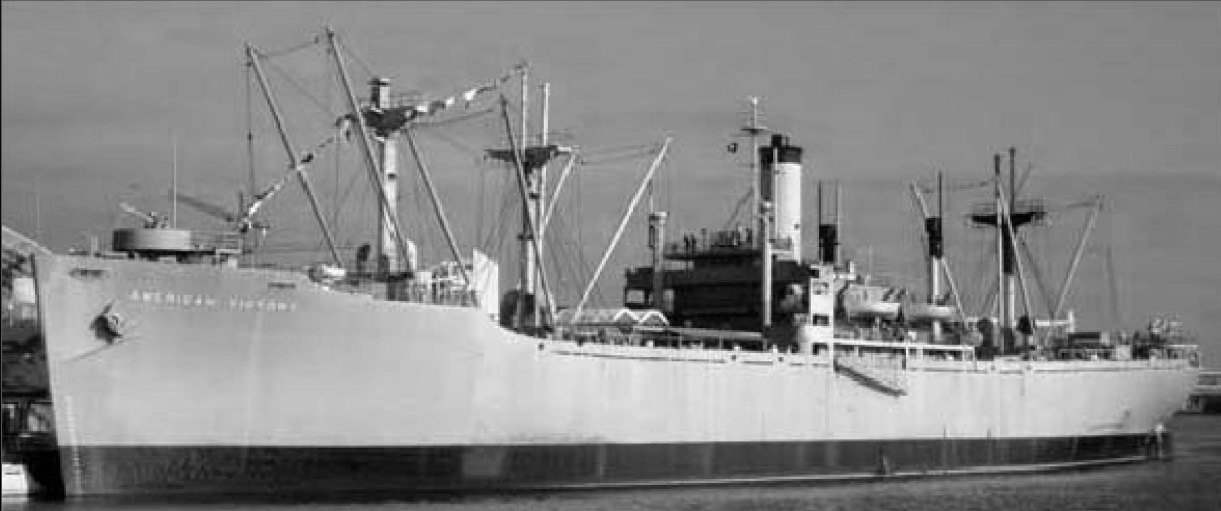
A VC2-S-AP2 type Victory ship

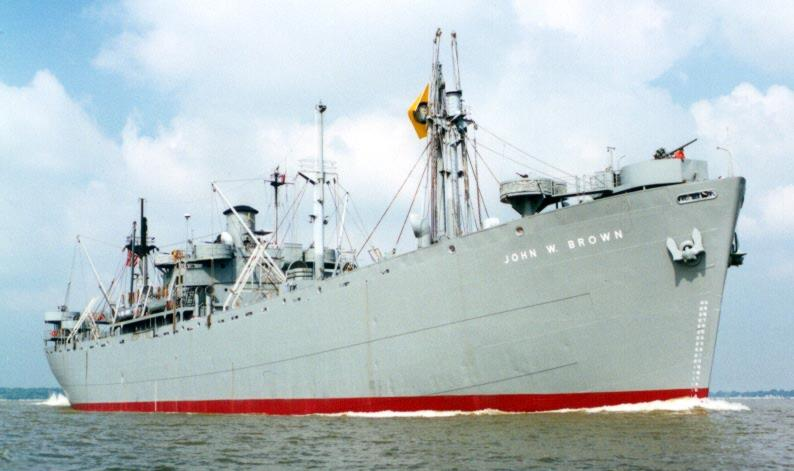
SS John W. Brown, one of four surviving Liberty ships in 2000

During World War II Bethlehem Steel Company had its subsidiary companies operated charter shipping to support the war. During World War II Bethlehem Steel Company had its subsidiary companies: Calmar Steamship Company and Interocean active with charter shipping for the Maritime Commission and War Shipping Administration. During wartime, the Companies operated Victory ships and Liberty ships. The ship was run by its crew and the US Navy supplied United States Navy Armed Guards to man the deck guns and radio. The most common armament mounted on these merchant ships were the MK II 20mm Oerlikon autocannon and the 3"/50, 4"/50, and 5"/38 deck guns. After the war there were many surplus ships and much competition. Black Diamond Steamship Company continued to operate after the war, but closed in the 1955.

  - Calmar Steamship Company operated World War 2 Victory ships:
- Blue Ridge Victory
- Hagerstown Victory
- Honduras Victory
- Nashua Victory
  - Calmar operated World War 2 Liberty ships:
- Andrew G. Curtin, Torpedoed Jan. 25, 1944 and sunk by U-716 at 73.20N 23.30E.
- Thomas McKean, Torpedoed June 29, 1942 and sunk in Caribbean by U-505 at 22.00N 60.00W
- Pierce Butler, Torpedoed Nov. 20, 1942 and sunk by U-177 in Indian Ocean at 29.53S 36.28E
- Benjamin Harrison, Torpedoed March 16, 1943 and sunk by U-172 at 39.02N 24.15W.
- James W. Denver, Torpedoed April 11, 1943 and sunk by U-195 west of Canary Islands
- James A. Butts
- Roy K. Johnson
- Flora MacDonald
- Frank R. Stockton
- Frederick H. Baetjer
- Frederick L. Dau
- Flora MacDonald
- Thomas Sully
- Philip F. Thomas, sank in 1956 as PELAGIA
- Benjamin Chew
- Christopher Newport
- Thomas Nelson
- Richard Henry Lee
- Grace Abbott
- William Paca
- SS Eleazar Wheelock
- James W. Wheeler
- SS John H. B. Latrobe

== See also ==
- Interocean Shipping Company
- Bethlehem Transportation Corporation
- Ore Steamship Company
