= SS Dunearn =

History

- Name: SS Avery Hill (1895-1899); SS Dunearn (1899-1908)
- Owner: Nitrate Producers Steamship Company - Lawther, Latta & Co., London (1895-1899); Dunedin S.S. Co. Ltd. - Henderson & McIntosh, Leith (1899-1908)
- Builder: Short Brothers, Pallion, Sunderland
- Yard number: 247
- Launched: 6 June 1895
- Completed: 10 August 1895
- Fate: Sunk on 26 August 1908

General characteristics
- Tonnage: 3,142 gross register tons (GRT); 2,020 net register tons (NRT); 5,130 tons deadweight (DWT)
- Length: 351.4 ft (107.1 m)
- Beam: 42.1 ft (12.8 m)
- Draught: 25.4 ft (7.7 m)
- Depth: 17.5 ft (5.3 m)
- Installed power: T3cyl (24.5, 40, 66 x 45in), 1500ihp
- Speed: 10 knots

SS Dunearn was a British steel screw steamer of 2300 tons. On 26 August 1908, while sailing through the Korea Strait near the Gotō Islands during a typhoon, the ship sank with a loss of 51 of 53 crew members. The two survivors were rescued by the Japanese steamer Sakyo Maru. The Captain commanding the ship on her last voyage was Captain J. Graham. The two survivors were William Phillips, an engineer, and John Landon, a seaman.

Dunearn was built in 1895 by Short Brothers in Sunderland. On her final voyage, the ship was carrying a load of coal from Kuchinotzu to Singapore.
