= SS Inchmay =

Inchmay was the name of two ships operated by the Inch Steamship Co:

- SS Inchmay (1919), ex Empire Gazelle, in service 1946–54
- SS Inchmay (1943), ex Empire Cromer, in service 1955–66
