= SS La Orilla =

A number of ships were named La Orilla, including:

- SS La Orilla (1942), built as Empire Envoy, in service 1952–1955
- SS La Orilla (1943), built as Mohawk Park, in service 1951–1952
