= SS Dea Mazzella =

A number of steamships were named Dea Mazzella, including:

- SS Dea Mazzella (1937), lost during World War II
- SS Dea Mazzella (1942), in service 1950–1956
