= Sir John Latta, 1st Baronet =

Scottish shipping magnate

Sir John Latta Bt
- Born: 9 May 1867; Old Cumnock, Ayrshire, Scotland
- Died: 5 December 1946 (aged 79)
- Occupation: Shipping magnate

Sir John Latta, 1st Baronet (9 May 1867 – 5 December 1946) was a Scottish shipping magnate.

Latta was born in Old Cumnock, Ayrshire, the son of William Latta, and was educated at Ayr Academy. He entered the family business, Lawther, Latta & Co Ltd, which owned the Nitrate Producers' Steamship Co Ltd, and later became chairman.

Under his chairmanship, the Nitrate Producers Steamship Company outgrew its title and expanded into all areas of cargo shipping, operating large freighters, mostly built by Shorts. The fleet performed sterling service in the South African War, First World War, and Second World War, and for his services to his country in the First World War, Latta was created a baronet in the 1920 New Year Honours.

His younger brother was Sir Andrew Gibson Latta. In 1896, Latta married Ada May (Mary) Short, a member of the Short Brothers shipbuilding dynasty. His only son predeceased him, so the baronetcy becoming extinct upon his death, although he also had two daughters.

== Footnotes ==
Baronetage of the United Kingdom
New creation	Baronet (of Portman Square); 1920–1946	Extinct
