= SS Anglo-Australian =

UK steam cargo ship

History

United Kingdom
- Name: Anglo-Australian
- Owner: Nitrate Producers Steam Ship Co.
- Operator: Lawther, Latta & Co.
- Port of registry: London
- Builder: Short Brothers, Ltd, Pallion
- Yard number: 424
- Laid down: 2 February 1926
- Launched: 21 March 1927
- Completed: 4 May 1927
- Out of service: March 1938
- Identification: UK official number 149817; Code letters KVTM (1927–33); Call sign GMXW (1934–38)
- Fate: Disappeared March 1938

General characteristics
- Type: Cargo ship
- Tonnage: 5,456 GRT, 3,332 NRT
- Length: 426.0 ft (129.8 m)
- Beam: 58.0 ft (17.7 m)
- Draught: 25 ft 0 in (7.62 m)
- Depth: 26.1 ft (8.0 m)
- Installed power: 453 nhp
- Propulsion: quadruple-expansion steam engine
- Speed: 10 1/2 knots (19.4 km/h)
- Crew: 38
- Sensors & processing systems: wireless direction finding
- Notes: sister ships: Anglo-African, Anglo-Peruvian, Anglo-Saxon

Anglo-Australian was a UK steam cargo ship that was built in 1927 and disappeared without trace in the Atlantic Ocean in March 1938.

== Building ==
Anglo-Australian was one of a series of similar-sized cargo ships that Short Brothers of Sunderland built for the Nitrate Producers' Steam Ship Co, Ltd. She was completed in May 1927. She had a four-cylinder quadruple-expansion steam engine, built by the North Eastern Marine Engineering Company, that was rated at 453 NHP and gave her a speed of about 10 1/2 knots (19.4 km/h). By 1930 she was equipped with wireless direction finding.

== Final voyage and loss ==
In February 1938 Anglo-Australian's main boilers were internally inspected at Birkenhead. On 3 and 4 March 1938 she was dry-docked in Cardiff. On 5 March Board of Trade inspectors tested her Marconi wireless. From 4 to 8 March she bunkered in Cardiff.

After noon on 8 March Anglo-Australian left in ballast bound for British Columbia via the Panama Canal. She was to load timber in Vancouver. On 14 March she passed the Azores and between 1800 and 1830 hrs sent a wireless message "Passed Fayal this afternoon. Nine knots. Twenty-six tons bunkers consumed. Rough weather. All well."

Nothing more was ever heard from her, nor any wreckage found. Other ships in the area at the time reported a Force 8 gale or Force 9 severe gale, causing very heavy seas and a heavy swell. The Board of Trade estimated that on the night of 14 March the trough of the storm would have passed nearer Anglo-Australian than any of the other ships in the area, and that she would have encountered the worst of the weather.

== Court of inquiry ==
The Board of Trade proposed a range theories for the loss of the ship. A Court of Inquiry held in October 1938 dismissed all but one of them as "unlikely" or "unlikely in the extreme".

The Court noted that about a year after Anglo-Australian entered service she suffered a crack in her shelter deck. This was welded up, but such cracks recurred, and the most recent was "shortly before the ship sailed on her last voyage". The Court opined that the recurrent cracks, all in a similar place, suggested a structural weakness.

The Court also found that there was evidence that in previous encounters with heavy weather while in ballast the ship had shown visible buckling amidships.

The Court concluded that the ship probably broke her back.

== Bibliography ==
- Wilson, RM (1956). The Big Ships. London: Cassell & Co. pp. 228, 229.
