= SS Anglo-African =

History

United Kingdom
- Name: Anglo-African
- Owner: Lawther, Latta & Co.
- Operator: Nitrate Producers Steam Ship Co.
- Builder: Short Brothers, Ltd., Pallion
- Yard number: 292
- Laid down: 25 November 1899
- Launched: 24 September 1900
- Completed: 12 November 1900
- Maiden voyage: 25 November 1900
- Home port: London
- Identification: UK official number 112770; code letters SBHF
- Fate: Wrecked, 5 January 1909

General characteristics
- Type: Cargo ship
- Tonnage: 4,186 GRT; 2,693 NRT; 7,350 DWT
- Length: 370 ft 2 in (112.83 m)
- Beam: 48 ft 7 in (14.81 m)
- Depth: 19 ft 0 in (5.79 m)
- Installed power: 418 Nhp
- Propulsion: George Clark 3-cylinder triple expansion
- Speed: 11.0 knots (12.7 mph; 20.4 km/h)

Anglo-African was a steam cargo ship built in 1900 by the Short Brothers of Sunderland for Lawther, Latta & Co. of London with intention of operating on their Australian routes. The vessel operated mostly on South America to North America route during her career and was wrecked on one of her regular voyages in January 1909.

== Design and construction ==
In 1897 Lawther, Latta & Co. sold their pioneer steamship Colonel J.T. North and placed an order for the first of a series of steamers of approximately 7,500 DWT to carry nitrates and metal ores from South America and Australia to the United Kingdom. Anglo-African was the third of these ships, and was laid down at the Short Brothers' Pallion Yard in Sunderland on 25 November 1899 (yard number 292) and launched on 24 September 1900.

The ship was of the spar-deck type, had a continuous sheltered deck constructed both fore and aft to carry large quantities of cattle or light cargo, and had the deck houses erected on top of shade deck amidships. The vessel had all the modern machinery fitted for quick loading and unloading of the cargo from four main holds, including nine powerful steam winches and a large number of derricks. The vessel also had electrical lights installed along the decks.

As built, the ship was 370 feet 2 inches (112.83 m) long (between perpendiculars) and 48 feet 7 inches (14.81 m) abeam, a depth of 19 feet 0 inches (5.79 m). Anglo-African was assessed at 4,186 GRT and 2,693 NRT and had deadweight of approximately 7,350. The vessel had a steel hull with a double bottom built on the cellular principle, and a single 418 nhp triple-expansion steam engine, with cylinders of 26-inch (66 cm), 43-inch (110 cm) and 71-inch (180 cm) diameter with a 51-inch (130 cm) stroke, that drove a single screw propeller, and moved the ship at up to 11.0 knots (12.7 mph; 20.4 km/h). The steam for the engine was supplied by two single-ended Scotch marine boilers fitted with the Howden's forced draught system.

The sea trials were held on 13 November 1900, during which the ship could easily maintain an average speed of 12.0 knots (13.8 mph; 22.2 km/h) over several runs on the measured mile. The steamer was transferred to her owners on the same day and left for loading to London.

== Operational history ==
Upon delivery Anglo-African sailed first to London, and then departed for Cape Town on 25 November 1900 for her maiden voyage. She reached her destination on December 20 and continued to Durban. The steamer left Natal on 18 January 1901 and arrived at Iquique on February 10, where the ship loaded a cargo of nitrates. She arrived at Cuxhaven on April 9 successfully concluding her nearly six month long maiden voyage. Following her maiden trip, the ship was chartered by the British Admiralty to transport remounts to South Africa during the Anglo-Boer War.

=== In the Imperial Government Service ===
After unloading her cargo, Anglo-African departed Cardiff on 4 May 1901 in ballast and arrived at Montreal on May 18. The loading and stalls installation was done in record time, and the vessel was able to depart on May 21 with horses destined for Baden-Powell's police force. Afterwards, the steamer sailed from Durban for Rosario and brought back a large cargo of hay.

Remounts for the British Army carried by Anglo-African to South Africa in 1901-1902
Date of departure	Port of departure	Date of arrival	Port of arrival	No. of remounts embarked
21 May 1901	Montreal	18 June 1901	Durban	750 horses
23 February 1902	Queenstown	21 March 1902	Durban	528 horses
3 May 1902	Queenstown	29 May 1902	Durban	500 horses

As Anglo-African was built for use on Australian trade routes, she sailed from South Africa to Australia and arrived at Adelaide on October 5. While in Australia, she loaded 2,544 tons metal concentrate at Port Pirie and a cargo of wool and other general cargo at Adelaide, Sydney and Melbourne, and left for European ports of Dunkirk, Antwerp and Hamburg on 5 November and reached London on 10 January 1902.

After finishing her third trip to South Africa in Admiralty transport capacity, Anglo-African was released from her charter due to the end of hostilities. The steamer sailed to Las Palmas and from there proceeded to North America on June 16 to resume her commercial activity.

=== Regular commercial service ===
The ship arrived at Delaware Breakwater for orders on 30 June 1902, and proceeded to New York for loading. In July 1902 a very serious rate fight erupted in South African shipping trade, after the Houston Line and the Prince Line entered the fray against the so-called "shipping ring" consisting of the Union-Castle Line, the Clan Line, the Bucknall Line, the Ellerman Lines, the Harrison Line, J. T. Rennie & Co., and Bullard, King & Co. Anglo-African was chartered by the "shipping ring" to meet the competition from other carriers and left New York on August 2 for South African ports. From Cape Town she proceeded to Buenos Aires, and from there to Rangoon returning to Liverpool on 6 May 1903.

Following her first post-war commercial trip, the steamer was chartered for one trip to east coast of South America by the Barber Line and sailed from England to New York on 7 July 1903. Anglo-African left New York on August 3 and after visiting the ports of Buenos Aires and Montevideo proceeded to the west coast of South America to load a cargo of nitrates. She departed Caleta Buena in Chile on October 17 and arrived in Baltimore on Christmas Eve with a cargo 69,807 bags of nitrate of soda consigned to Clarence Cottman Co. The vessel next sailed to Savannah where she took on a large cargo of cotton and departed for Liverpool on 17 January 1904.

The steamer conducted another trip to South America and Far East departing Barry on 20 February 1904 for Buenos Aires, from there sailing to Calcutta on April 14 and returning to Hamburg on July 27. She sailed for South America again on September 8, continuing to Iquique and after embarking about 6,800 tons of nitrate soda proceeded on December 12 to New Orleans reaching it on 31 January 1905. She sailed back to Europe on 28 February 1905 carrying a large cargo of cotton, cottonseed meal and lumber, arriving at Bremen on March 29.

The vessel continued to trade on the same route of England-South America-East Coast of North America-Germany for the rest of her career. She usually carried general cargo or coal to Buenos Aires and Montevideo, nitrate of soda from Chilean ports Caleta Buena and Iquique to Baltimore and Philadelphia, and cotton and lumber to Liverpool or German ports of Bremen and Hamburg. For example, she left London carrying 6,500 tons of coal and coke to Chile on 25 February 1907, unloaded it at Chilean ports of Valparaíso, Caleta Buena and Junín, and after loading nearly 7,000 tons of nitrate of soda sailed on June 6 for North America, arriving at Boston on 22 July 1907. She then sailed to Fernandina where she took on board 3,300 tons of phosphate pebble rock, stopped at Savannah to load 11,035 bales of cotton and departed for Dunkirk and Bremen via Newport News on September 20.

=== Sinking ===
Anglo-African left Cardiff on her last voyage on 17 July 1908 for Valparaíso fully laden with coal. The ship was under command of captain James Hedley Henderson and had a crew of 34. She reached her destination on August 26, and after discharging her cargo loaded almost 7,000 tons of nitrate of soda at Caleta Buena, Junín, Iquique and Tocopilla for delivery to North America. She left Tocopilla on 19 November 1908 and after largely uneventful journey arrived at Saint Lucia for coaling on December 28 and sailed the next day for Baltimore. The weather was fine and clear until the afternoon of 5 January 1909 when it first became cloudy and shortly after it started to rain. The weather progressively worsened through the evening and the late afternoon with heavy fog developing, but the ship continued on at full speed. Soundings were taken on the regular basis to ascertain the ship position relative to the coast, but no visual observations were possible due to thick weather at the time, and no lights from either Cape Henry or Cape Charles lighthouses could be seen.

At about 21:30 on January 5, Anglo-African ran aground on the sandbar just south of Smith Island, off Cape Charles in an approximate position 37°3′25.1″N 75°53′57.5″W The captain immediately ordered the engines to be reversed and they were kept working through the night in an attempt to dislodge the vessel, but the efforts failed and the ship could not be moved.

Two tugs, Defiance and Anna W., came to help the next morning and were able to move the ship seaward a few hundred feet, but the weather soon deteriorated with the wind picking up making the salvage work very difficult. The salvage vessel I. J. Merritt also arrived on January 6 and offered help, but Captain Henderson declined the offer. At about 13:00 on January 7 the crew started discharging the cargo from the No. 2 hold trying to lighten the vessel up before another attempt to refloat the steamer could be made. About 50 to 55 tons of cargo was jettisoned overboard.

During the night of 7 January a strong nor'easter passed through the area severely damaging the ship. By 11:00 on 8 January all crew had abandoned the ship as Anglo-African had water in all her cargo holds and developed a heavy list to port. Following further investigation, the ship was abandoned on 11 January, as she was mostly under water in high tide and there were large holes in her bottom making the salvage operation impossible. As the wreck presented a grave danger to navigation, it was blown up by dynamite and sank in about 24 feet (7.3 m) of water by the destroyer Seneca on 25 August, and the wreck was marked with buoys on 22–23 September 1909 to avoid any potential accidents.

Following the inquiry into the stranding, captain Henderson was found at fault for the loss of the vessel and had his certificate suspended for three months. He died soon after the inquiry.
