= SS Matelots Pillien et Peyrat =

General cargo ship built in 1943

History
- Name: Empire Friendship (1943–45); Matelots Pillien et Peyrat (1945–62)
- Owner: Ministry of War Transport (1943–44); French Government (1945–48); Compagnie Havraise de Navigation à Vapeur (1948–62); Compagnie Havraise de Navigation Corblet (1962)
- Operator: Sir R. Ropner & Co. Ltd. (1943–45); Compagnie de Navigation Mixte (1945–48); L Corblet & Compagnie (1948–62); Compagnie Havraise de Navigation Corblet (1962)
- Port of registry: Sunderland, United Kingdom (1943–45); Le Havre, France (1945–62); (France) Dunkerque (1962)
- Builder: Short Brothers Ltd
- Yard number: 475
- Launched: 19 February 1943
- Completed: May 1943
- Identification: United Kingdom Official Number 169114 (1943–45); Code Letters BFJB (1943–45); Code Letters FPOZ (1945–62)
- Fate: Driven ashore and damaged. Declared a constructive total loss and consequently scrapped

General characteristics
- Type: Cargo ship
- Tonnage: 7,058 GRT, 4,873 NRT, 10,435 DWT
- Length: 431 ft 0 in (131.37 m)
- Beam: 56 ft 3 in (17.15 m)
- Draught: 26 ft 9 in (8.15 m)
- Depth: 35 ft 2 in (10.72 m)
- Installed power: Triple expansion steam engine, 510 nhp
- Propulsion: Single screw propeller
- Armament: Anti-torpedo nets (Empire Friendship)

Matelots Pillien et Peyrat was a 7,058 GRT cargo ship which was built in 1943 as Empire Friendship by Short Brothers Ltd, Sunderland, County Durham, United Kingdom for the Ministry of War Transport (MoWT). Ownership was transferred to the French Government in 1945, when she was renamed Matelots Pillien et Peyrat She was sold to Compagnie Havraise de Navigation à Vapeur, Paris in 1948. She was driven ashore at Port-de-Bouc, Bouches-du-Rhône in October 1962. Declared a constructive total loss, she was scrapped.

== Description ==
The ship was 431 ft 0 in (131.37 m) long, with a beam of 56 ft 3 in (17.15 m). She had a depth of 35 ft 2 in (10.72 m) and a draught of 26 ft 9 in (8.15 m). She was assessed at 7,058 GRT, 4,873 NRT, 10,435 DWT.

The ship was propelled by a 510 nhp triple expansion steam engine, which had cylinders of 24 1/2 inches (62 cm), 39 1/8 inches (99 cm) and 70 inches (180 cm) diameter by 48 inches (120 cm) stroke. The engine was built by North East Marine Engineering Co (1938) Ltd, Newcastle upon Tyne. It drove a single screw propeller.

== History ==
Empire Friendship was built in 1943 as yard number 475 by Short Brothers Ltd., Sunderland, County Durham for the Ministry of War Transport (MoWT). She was launched on 19 February 1943 and completed in May 1943. Her port of registry was Sunderland. The United Kingdom Official Number 169114 and Code Letters BFJB were allocated. She was operated under the management of Sir R. Ropner & Co. Ltd.

Empire Friendship made her maiden voyage by joining Convoy FN 1018, which had departed from Southend, Essex on 11 May 1943 and arrived at Methil, Fife on 13 May. She then joined Convoy EN 229, which departed from Methil on 15 May and arrived at Loch Ewe on 17 May. She then sailed on to Liverpool Lancashire, arriving on 19 May. She departed on 4 June with Convoy OS49/KM, which split at sea on 13 June. Empire Friendship was in the part of the convoy that formed Convoy KMS 16, which departed from Gibraltar on 16 June and arrived at Port Said, Egypt on 28 June. She was bound for Algiers, Algeria, where she arrived on 18 June. She then sailed to Bône, Algeria, departing on 19 July to join Convoy MKS 18, which had departed from Tripoli, Libya on 17 July and arrived at Gibraltar on 23 July. She sailed on 2 August for Mellila, Spain, where she arrived on 4 August. Empire Friendship departed on 6 August and reached Gibraltar the next day. She sailed with Convoy MKS 21G, which departed on 14 August and arrived at the Clyde on 26 August. Her cargo was iron ore, which was delivered to Cardiff, Glamorgan on 27 August.

Empire Friendship sailed from Cardiff on 4 October, arriving at Milford Haven, Pembrokeshire later that day. She sailed on 6 October to join Convoy OS56KM, which departed from Liverpool on 7 October and split at sea on 18 October. She was carrying general cargo and was equipped with anti-torpedo nets. She was in the part of the convoy that formed Convoy KMS 29G and arrived at Gibraltar on 20 October. She then joined Convoy KMS 29, which departed from Gibraltar that day and arrived at Port Said, Egypt on 31 October. Empire Friendship then sailed to Suez, Egypt, from where she departed on 11 November for Aden. She arrived on 16 November and sailed on 21 November with Convoy AKD 7, which arrived at Kilindini Harbour, Kenya on 1 December. She then joined Convoy AKD 7S, which sailed that day and arrived at Durban, South Africa on 10 December. She left the convoy and put in to Lourenço Marques, Mozambique on 7 December.

Empire Friendship sailed from Lourenço Marques on 19 December for Aden, where she arrived on 4 January 1944. She sailed two days later for Suez, arriving on 12 January. She sailed for Aden on 1 February, arriving on 6 February. She then joined Convoy AKD 15, which sailed on 13 February and arrived at Kilindini Harbour on 22 February. She sailed on to Lourenço Marques, arriving on 26 February. Empire Friendship departed from Lourenço Marques on 13 March to join Convoy DKA 15, which had departed from Durban on 11 March and arrived at Kilindini Harbour on 1 April. She sailed on 9 April for Lourenço Marques, arriving on 25 April and sailing the next day for Durban, where she arrived on 28 April. Empire Friendship was a member of convoy DC 51, which sailed on 6 June and arrived at Cape Town, South Africa on 10 June. She then joined Convoy CN 32, which sailed on 21 June and dispersed at sea the next day. Her destination was Montevideo, Uruguay, where she arrived on 16 July. Empire Friendship sailed a week later for Bahia Blanca, Argentina, arriving on 26 July. She departed on 8 August for Buenos Aires, Argentina, where she arrived on 10 August. She sailed on 26 August for Freetown, Sierra Leone, arriving on 12 September. Carrying a cargo of wheat and 96 bags of mails, she sailed with Convoy SL 171 on 18 September. The convoy rendezvoused at sea with Convoy MKS 62 on 30 September. The combined convoy arrived at Liverpool on 8 October. She sailed on to the Clyde, arriving the next day.

Empire Friendship sailed on 2 November to join Convoy OS94KM, which departed from Liverpool on 3 November and split at sea on 7 November. She was carrying a cargo of ammunition and vehicles bound for Alexandria. She was in the part of the convoy which formed Convoy KMS 68G and arrived at Gibraltar on 13 November. Her destination had now been changed to Augusta, Sicily, Italy. She saile with Convoy KMS 68 that day. The convoy arrived at Port Said on 22 November. Empire Friendship arrived at August on 18 November. She sailed the next day with Convoy AH 80, which arrived at Bari on 21 November. She left the convoy at Brindisi on 21 November, departing four days later to join Convoy AH 81, which had sailed from Augusta on 24 November and arrived at Bari on 26 November. She sailed on to Ancona, arriving the next day. Empire Friendship departed from Ancona under escort on 7 December, arriving at Bari two days later. She sailed on 14 December for Oran, Algeria, where she arrived on 19 December. She sailed on 23 December with Convoy GUS 62, which had arrived at the Hampton Roads, Virginia, United States on 10 January 1945.

Empire Friendship departed from the Hampton Roads on 2 February with Convoy UGS 72, which arrived at Gibraltar on 17 February. She sailed the next day for Algiers, arriving on 21 February and departed a week later for Naples, Italy, where she arrived on 3 March. She sailed on 20 March for Gibraltar, arriving on 24 March. Empire Friendship sailed on 27 March from Mellila, arriving the next day and sailing later that day for Gibraltar, where she arrived on 29 March. Carrying a cargo of iron ore, she sailed with Convoy MKS 93G on 5 April. They convoy arrived at Liverpool on 14 April, She left the convoy on 12 April and arrived at Cardiff, Glamorgan.

Empire Friendship sailed on 6 May for Milford Haven, Pembrokeshire, arriving the next day. She sailed on 10 May to join Convoy ONS 50, which departed from Liverpool on 11 May and arrived at Halifax, Nova Scotia, Canada on 29 May. Her destination was Wabana, Newfoundland. She left the convoy at Bay Bulls on 26 May, sailing four days later and arriving at Wabana on 31 May. Empire Friendship sailed on 3 June for Saint John's, Newfoundland, where she arrived the next day. She departed on 7 June and arrived at the Clyde on 18 June.

Empire Friendship was sold to the French Government in August 1945 as part of a scheme to enable Allied governments to replace shipping lost during the war. She was one of a batch of seven vessels sold that month. the others being Empire Crown, Empire Driver, Empire Falstaff, Empire Moulmein, Empire Sceptre and Empire Sedley. She was renamed Matelots Pillien et Peyraut, and placed under the management of Compagnie de Navigation Mixte. Her port of registry was Le Havre. The Code Letters FPOZ were allocated. Jacques Pillien and Paul Peyrat were sailors who tried to capture the Vichy French merchant ship Gabriel Guist'Hau off Gibraltar on 6 March 1942 and deliver her to the Allies. They were both executed on 23 March in Oran. In 1948, she was sold to the Compagnie Havraise de Navigation à Vapeur, Le Havre and placed under the management of L. Corblet et Compagnie, Le Havre. In 1962, her owners were the Compagnie Havraise de Navigation Corblet and her port of registry was changed to Dunkerque. On 29 October 1962, she was driven on to a breakwater at the entrance to the Canal de Marseille au Rhône at Port-de-Bouc, Bouches-du-Rhône. She was refloated on 3 November but was declared a constructive total loss. She arrived at La Seyne-sur-Mer, Var on 11 November for scrapping.
