= Falzarego =

Falzarego may refer to:

- The Falzarego Pass, in Italy
- SS Falzarego, an Italian merchant ship in service 1960–64
