= Belgrano (1872 ship) =

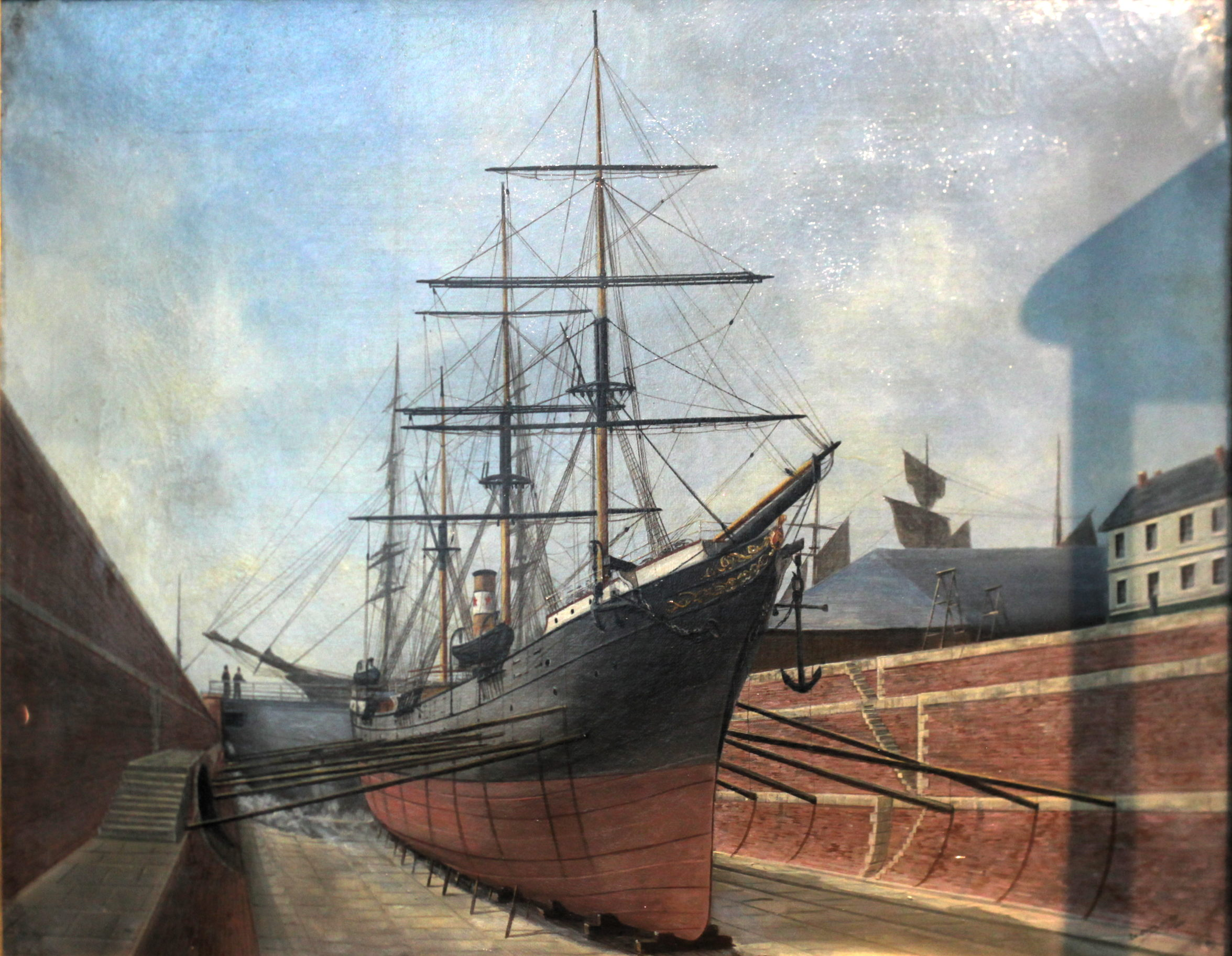
- Sail and steam liner refitting, probably Belgrano. Painting by Édouard Adam.

History

France
- Name: Belgrano
- Namesake: Manuel Belgrano
- Builder: Chantiers de l'Océan, Le Havre
- Launched: 24 April 1872
- Out of service: 1894

General characteristics
- Tons burthen: 2131 tons
- Length: 107 m (351 ft)
- Beam: 10.06 m (33.0 ft)
- Propulsion: 700 shp 2-cylinder compound steam engine
- Speed: 11 knots
- Capacity: 450 passengers * 1,100 m^{3} of hold

Belgrano was a French sail and steam liner, belonging to the Compagnie Maritime des Chargeurs Réunis

== Career ==
Built as Louis XIV for the company Quesnel Frères, the ship was purchased by the newly founded Compagnie des Chargeurs Réunis and renamed Belgrano while on keel. Launched on 24 April 1872, she shuttled between La Plata and Le Havre, carrying immigrants to Argentina.

In 1880, Belgrano was transformed into a cooling ship and ferried meat from Argentina to France.

== Notes and references ==
=== References ===
- Painting notice at the Musée national de la Marine
