= List of Liberty ships (I) =

This is a list of Liberty ships with names beginning with I.

== Description ==
The standard Liberty ship (EC-2-S-C1 type) was a cargo ship 441 feet 6 inches (134.57 m) long overall, with a beam of 56 feet 10 3/4 inches (17.34 m). It had a depth of 37 feet 4 inches (11.38 m) and a draft of 26 feet 10 inches (8.18 m). It was powered by a triple expansion steam engine, which had cylinders of 24 1/2 inches (62 cm), 37 inches (94 cm) and 70 inches (180 cm) diameter by 48 inches (120 cm) stroke. The engine produced 2,500ihp at 76rpm. Driving a four-blade propeller 18 feet 6 inches (5.64 m) in diameter, could propel the ship at 11 knots (20 km/h).

Cargo was carried in five holds, numbered 1–5 from bow to stern. Grain capacity was 84,183 cubic feet (2,383.8 m^{3}), 145,604 cubic feet (4,123.0 m^{3}), 96,429 cubic feet (2,730.6 m^{3}), 93,190 cubic feet (2,639 m^{3}) and 93,190 cubic feet (2,639 m^{3}), with a further 49,086 cubic feet (1,390.0 m^{3}) in the deep tanks. Bale capacity was 75,405 cubic feet (2,135.2 m^{3}), 134,638 cubic feet (3,812.5 m^{3}), 83,697 cubic feet (2,370.0 m^{3}), 82,263 cubic feet (2,329.4 m^{3}) and 82,435 cubic feet (2,334.3 m^{3}), with a further 41,135 cubic feet (1,164.8 m^{3}) in the deep tanks.

It carried a crew of 45, plus 36 United States Navy Armed Guard gunners. Later in the war, this was altered to a crew of 52, plus 29 gunners. Accommodation was in a three deck superstructure placed midships. The galley was equipped with a range, a 25 US gallons (95 L) stock kettle and other appliances. Messrooms were equipped with an electric hot plate and an electric toaster.

== I. B. Perrine ==
I. B. Perrine was built by Todd Houston Shipbuilding Corporation, Houston, Texas. Her keel was laid on 18 October 1944. She was launched as I. B. Perrine on 22 November and delivered as Eleftheria on 30 November. She struck a mine at the mouth of the Scheldt on 23 March 1945 whilst on a voyage from Ghent, Belgium to the River Thames. She grounded north of Ostend, Belgium and broke in two. Her wreck was dispersed in 1952.

== Ibex ==
Ibex was a tanker built by California Shipbuilding Corporation, Terminal Island, Los Angeles, California. Her keel was laid as Nicholas Longworth. She was delivered to the United States Navy as Ibex in December 1943. Returned to the WSA in 1946 and renamed Nicholas Longworth. Sold in 1948 to T. & J. Stevenson, New York and renamed Helen Stevenson. Converted to a cargo ship at Norfolk, Virginia in 1949. Now 7,129 GRT. On 18 February 1952, she developed a crack in her deck 230 nautical miles (430 km) north west of Bermuda whilst on a voyage from Trieste, Italy to New York. She was escorted in to Hamilton, Bermuda on 21 February by USCGC Dexter. Sold in 1957 to Elderfields Steamship Co. and renamed Elderfields. Re-registered to Liberia and operated under the management of Ocean Freighting & Brokerage Corp. Sold in 1961 to Marine Development & Supply SA, Panama and renamed Winner. Remaining registered in Liberia, and operated under the management of Marine Industry Corp. Driven ashore in a typhoon at Wakanoura, Japan on 10 September 1965. Refloated on 25 September and taken in to Hitachi for drydocking. Subsequently towed to Osaka. Repairs declared uneconomic, she was scrapped at Hirao, Japan in February 1966.

== Ida M. Tarbell ==
Ida M. Tarbell was built by California Shipbuilding Corporation. Her keel was laid on 31 January 1944. She was launched on 15 February and delivered on 15 March. Built for the WSA, she was operated under the management of American Mail Line. Laid up in 1946. Sold in 1947 to George D. Gratsos Shipping Co. Athens, Greece and renamed Triton. Operated under the management of Dracoulis Ltd. She was scrapped at Hirao in January 1968.

== Ida Straus ==
Ida Straus was built by Todd Houston Shipbuilding Corporation. Her keel was laid on 1 July 1944. She was launched on 10 August and delivered on 22 August. She was scrapped at Baltimore, Maryland in March 1960.

== Ignace Paderewski ==
Ignace Paderewski was built by California Shipbuilding Corporation. Her keel was laid on 12 April 1943. She was launched on 4 May and delivered on 16 May. Stranded in a typhoon in 1945 and severely damaged. Declared a constructive total loss, she was laid up in the James River. She was scrapped in Baltimore in September 1947.

== Ignatius Donnelly ==
Ignatius Donnelly was built by Oregon Shipbuilding Corporation, Portland, Oregon. Her keel was laid on 11 April 1943. She was launched on 30 April and delivered on 8 May. She was scrapped at Vancouver, Washington in April 1962.

== Imboden Seam ==
Imboden Seam was a collier built by Delta Shipbuilding Company New Orleans, Louisiana. Her keel was laid on 23 April 1945. She was launched on 28 June and delivered on 25 August. Built for War Shipping Administration (WSA), she was operated under the management of Eastern Gas & Fuel Associates, Boston, Massachusetts. Sold to her managers in 1946. Sold in 1947 to Mystic Steamship Division and renamed Reading. Operated under the management of her previous owner. Ran aground in Buzzards Bay, Massachusetts in February 1957 and was severely damaged. Later refloated and drydocked at New York, where she was repaired. Sold in 1961 to Massachusetts Trustees of Eastern Gas & Fuel Associates, Boston. Sold in 1963 to Mystic Steamship Corp., Boston. Sold in 1965 to Sulpho Marine Transport Inc., New York. Sold in 1970 to Zip Corp. Re-registered to Panama and operated under the management of Olssen Gresser Associates. Arrived at Ferrol, Spain in June 1971 with boiler damage. Subsequently placed under restraint for debt. Sold for breaking in October 1872, she was towed to Santander, Spain in November 1972 for scrapping.

== Ina Coolbrith ==
Ina Coolbrith was built by California Shipbuilding Corporation. Her keel was laid on 25 June 1943. She was launched on 19 July and delivered on 31 July. Laid up in the James River post-war, she was scrapped at Philadelphia, Pennsylvania in January 1971.

== Increase A. Lapham ==
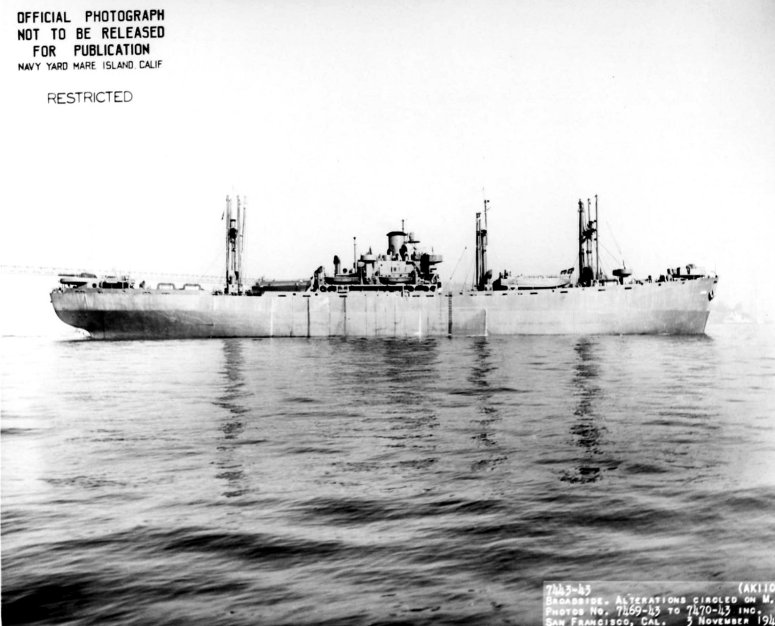
USS Alkes

Increase A. Lapham was built by Permanente Metals Corporation, Richmond, California. Her keel was laid on 10 June 1943. She was launched on 29 June and delivered on 16 July. To the United States Navy in October 1943 and renamed Alkes. Returned to the WSA in February 1946 and renamed Increase A. Lapham. Laid up in the James River. She was scrapped at Bilbao, Spain in April 1972.

== Indian Island ==
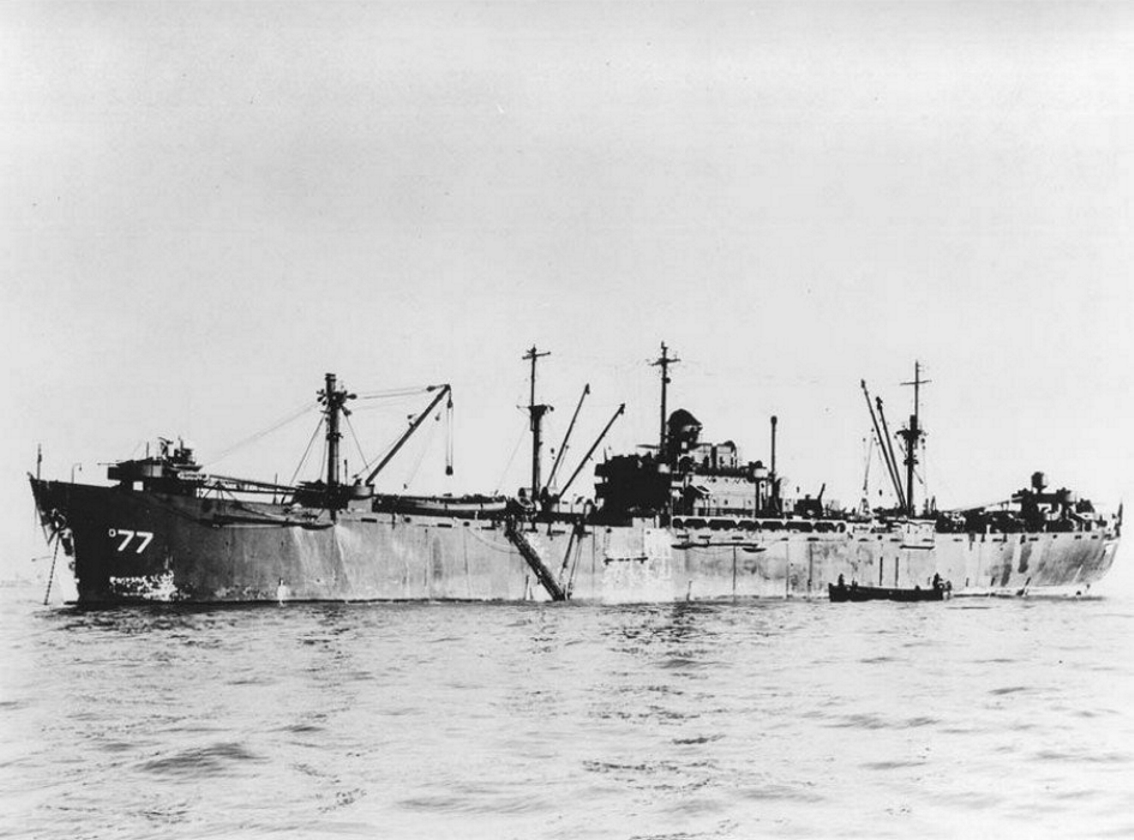
USS Indian Island

Indian Island was built by New England Shipbuilding Corporation, South Portland, Maine. Her keel was laid on 6 November 1944. She was launched on 19 December and delivered on 30 December. Completed for the United States Navy by Bethlehem Steel Co., Brooklyn, New York. Placed in reserve at Orange, Texas in May 1947. She was scrapped at New Orleans in 1961.

== I. N. Van Nuys ==
I. N. Van Nuys was built by California Shipbuilding Corporation. Her keel was laid on 29 January 1944. She was launched on 23 February and delivered on 13 March. Built for the WSA, she was operated under the management of Burns Steamship Co. Sold in 1947 to Stratis. G. Andreadis, Chios, Greece and renamed Alexandros Koryzis Operated under the management of Livanos & Co. Sold in 1976 to Olkas Marine Enterprises. Operated under the management of Commercial Trading & Discount Co. Laid up at Eleusis, Greece on 12 July 1977. Management transferred to Andreas (UK) Ltd. in 1980. She was scrapped at Split, Yugoslavia in 1985.

== Iolanda ==
Iolanda was built by New England Shipbuilding Corporation. Her keel was laid on 9 September 1944. She was launched as William A. Dobson on 21 October and delivered to the United States Navy as Iolanda on 31 October. Completed by Bethlehem Steel Co., East Boston, Massachusetts. Laid up in reserve at Pearl Harbor, Hawaii in June 1946. Towed to San Francisco, California in April 1947 and laid up in Suisun Bay. Sold to shipbreakers on the west coast of the United States in October 1972 and subsequently scrapped.

== Ira Nelson Morris ==
Ira Nelson Morris was built by J. A. Jones Construction Company, Brunswick, Georgia. Her keel was laid on 26 October 1944. She was launched on 25 November and delivered on 8 December. Built for the WSA, she was operated under the management of Seas Shipping Co. She was scrapped at Terminal Island in November 1965.

== Irving Babbitt ==
Irving Babbitt was built by Todd Houston Shipbuilding Corporation. Her keel was laid on 29 July 1944. She was launched on 5 September and delivered on 21 September. She was scrapped at Philadelphia in September 1962.

== Irving. M. Scott ==
Irving. M. Scott was built by Permanente Metals Corporation. Her keel was laid on 6 May 1943. She was launched on 30 May and delivered on 10 June. She was scrapped at Portland, Oregon in January 1960.

== Irving W. Pratt ==
Irving W. Pratt was built by Oregon Shipbuilding Corporation. Her keel was laid on 1 June 1943. She was launched as Irving W. Pratt on 21 June and delivered as Nakhoda on 29 June. To the Soviet Union. She was scrapped in the Soviet Union in 1968.

== Irvin MacDowell ==
Irvin MacDowell was built by Permanente Metals Corporation. Her keel was laid on 24 January 1942. She was launched on 22 May and delivered on 10 July. She was scrapped at Bilbao in May 1970.

== Irvin S. Cobb ==
Irvin S. Cobb was built by St. Johns River Shipbuilding Company, Jacksonville, Florida. Her keel was laid on 13 July 1944. She was launched on 22 August and delivered on 31 August. She was scrapped at Panama City, Florida in 1967.

== Irwin Russell ==
Irwin Russell was a tanker built by Delta Shipbuilding Company. Her keel was laid on 26 July 1943. She was launched on 16 September and delivered on 30 October. Built for the WSA, she was operated under the management of American Republics Corp. Sold in 1947 to Windsor Navigation Co., New York and renamed Elizabeth H. Sold in 1954 to Windsor Tankers Inc. Re-registered to Liberia and operated under the management of her previous owner. She was scrapped at Hirao in February 1962.

== Isaac Babbitt ==
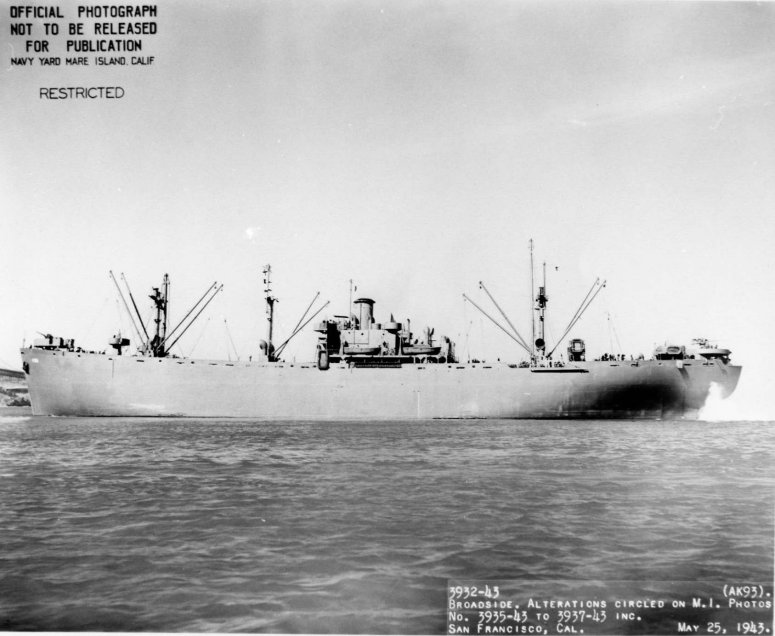
USS Etamin

Isaac Babbitt was built by Permanente Metals Corporation. Her keel was laid on 28 March 1943. She was launched on 25 April and delivered on 8 May. To the United States Navy as Etamin. Torpedoed and damaged by Japanese aircraft in Milne Bay on 27 April 1944. Towed to Finschhafen, New Guinea for temporary repairs. Then towed to Cairns, Australia. Placed in reserve as a storage hulk on 12 August 1944. Struck from the Navy list on 31 July 1946. She was scrapped by Asia Development Co., Shanghai, China in 1949.

== Isaac Coles ==
Isaac Coles was built by California Shipbuilding Corporation. Her keel was laid on 8 April 1942. She was launched on 7 June and delivered on 26 June. She was scrapped at Mobile, Alabama in May 1967.

== Isaac Delgado ==
Isaac Delgado was built by Delta Shipbuilding Company. Her keel was laid on 3 July 1944. She was launched on 12 August and delivered on 19 September. She was scrapped at Panama City, Florida in April 1969.

== Isaac I. Stevens ==
Isaac I. Stevens was built by Oregon Shipbuilding Corporation. Her keel was laid on 4 December 1943. She was launched on 20 December and delivered on 6 January 1944. Built for the WSA, she was operated under the management of Interocean Steamship Corp. To the French Government in 1947 and renamed Saint Dié. Operated under the management of Chargeurs Réunis. Sold in 1965 to Regina Steamship Corp. and renamed Vara. Re-registered to Liberia and operated under the management of Euclid Steamship Corp. She was scrapped at Yokosuka, Japan in 1967.

== Isaac Mayer Wise ==
Isaac Mayer Wise was built by St. Johns River Shipbuilding Company. Her keel was laid on 3 November 1944. She was launched on 6 December and delivered on 15 December. Laid up at Mobile post-war, she was scrapped at Brownsville, Texas in September 1972.

== Isaac McCoy ==
Isaac McCoy was built by Oregon Shipbuilding Corporation. Her keel was laid on 12 November 1943. She was launched on 1 December and delivered on 15 December. She was scrapped at Tampa, Florida in May 1961.

== Isaac M. Singer ==
Isaac M. Singer was built by St. Johns River Shipbuilding Company. Her keel was laid on 17 November 1944. She was launched on 19 November and delivered on 27 November. Laid up at Mobile post-war, she was scrapped at Kearny, New Jersey or Panama City, Florida in July 1970.

== Isaac Sharpless ==
Isaac Sharpless was built by New England Shipbuilding Corporation. Her keel was laid on 28 November 1942. She was launched on 14 February 1943 and delivered on 5 March. Laid up in the James River post-war, she was scrapped at Philadelphia in September 1971.

== Isaac Shelby ==
Isaac Shelby was built by J. A. Jones Construction Company, Brunswick. Her keel was laid on 22 January 1944. She was launched on 6 March and delivered on 18 March. Built for the WSA, she was operated under the management of Smith & Johnson Co. She struck a mine in the Mediterranean Sea 50 nautical miles (93 km) south of Rome, Italy (41°12′N 13°30′E) on 6 January 1945 and was damaged whilst on a voyage from Livorno to Naples, Italy. She was beached at Cape Cicero but broke in two and was declared a total loss. The stern section was later refloated. It was scrapped in Naples in August 1948.

== Isaac S. Hopkins ==
Isaac S. Hopkins was built by Southeastern Shipbuilding Corporation, Savannah, Georgia. Her keel was laid on 30 November 1943. She was launched on 26 January 1944 and delivered on 14 February. She was scrapped at Baltimore in May 1961.

== Isaac Van Zant ==
Isaac Van Zant was built by Todd Houston Shipbuilding Corporation. Her keel was laid on 10 February 1944. She was launched on 18 March and delivered on 30 March. She was transferred to the United States Navy in 1966. Scuttled in the Pacific Ocean with a cargo of obsolete explosives on 23 May 1966.

== Israel J. Merritt ==
Israel J. Merritt was built by Bethlehem Fairfield Shipyard, Baltimore. Her keel was laid on 12 October 1943. She was launched at Israel J. Merritt on 9 November and delivered as Samflora on 17 November. To the Ministry of War Transport (MoWT) under Lend-Lease. She was operated under the management of Union-Castle Mail Steamship Co. Sold in 1947 to Pulteney Hill Steamship Co. and renamed Primrose Hill. Operated under the management of Counties Ship Management. Sold in 1949 to London & Overseas Freighters, London. Renamed London Vendor in 1950. Sold in 1952 to Argequipa Compania Navigation, Panama and renamed Cabanos. Operated under the management of Sea Traffic & Trading Corp. Sold in 1963 to Compania Santa Helle, Panama and renamed Thebean. Operated under the management of Camberley Steamship Co. Sold in 1964 to Compania Santa Roberta and re-registered to Greece. She was scrapped at Onomichi, Japan in March 1968.

== Israel Putnam ==
Israel Putnam was built by Alabama Drydock Company, Mobile. She was completed in October 1942. She was scrapped in the United States c. 1965.

== Israel Wheelen ==
Israel Wheelen was built by Bethlehem Fairfield Shipyard. Her keel was laid on 14 November 1943. She was launched at Israel Wheelen on 6 December and delivered as Samport on 14 December. To the MoWT under Lend-Lease. She was operated under the management of Cayzer, Irvine & Co. Management transferred to Maclay & McIntyre Ltd. in 1947. Returned to United States Maritime Commission in 1947. Officially renamed Israel Wheeler but laid up at Mobile bearing the name Samport. She was scrapped at Panama City, Florida in November 1962.
