= SS Indian Endeavour =

History
- Name: Empire Dominica (1945-46); Indian Endeavour (1946-66)
- Owner: Ministry of War Transport (1945); Ministry of Transport (1945-46); India Steamship Co Ltd (1946-66)
- Operator: R Chapman & Son Ltd (1945-46); India Steamship Co Ltd (1946-66)
- Port of registry: (United Kingdom) Sunderland, UK (1945-1946); Calcutta, India (1946-47); (India) Calcutta (1947-66)
- Builder: Short Brothers Ltd
- Launched: 26 April 1945
- Completed: August 1945
- Maiden voyage: 30 August 1945
- Identification: United Kingdom Official Number 180162 (1945-46); Code Letters GFDR (1945-46)
- Fate: Scrapped

General characteristics
- Type: Cargo ship
- Tonnage: 7,306 GRT
- Length: 431 ft (131 m)
- Beam: 56 ft (17 m)
- Propulsion: Triple expansion steam engine

Indian Endeavour was a 7,306 GRT cargo ship that was built in 1945 as Empire Dominica by Short Brothers Ltd, Sunderland, Co Durham, United Kingdom for the Ministry of War Transport (MoWT). She was sold to India in 1946 and renamed Indian Endeavour, serving until 1966 when she was scrapped.

== Description ==
The ship was built in 1945 by Short Brothers Ltd, Sunderland, Co Durham.

The ship was 431 feet (131 m) long, with a beam of 56 feet (17 m). She was assessed at 7,306 GRT.

The ship was propelled by a triple expansion steam engine.

== History ==
Empire Dominica was launched on 26 April 1945 and completed in August. She was placed under the management of R Chapman & Son Ltd, Newcastle upon Tyne. Her port of registry was Sunderland. She was allocated the United Kingdom Official Number 180162, and the Code Letters GFDR.

Empire Dominica departed from Sunderland under tow on 9 June 1945, arriving at the Tyne that day. She made her maiden voyage on 30 August 1945, departing from the Tyne for Saint John, New Brunswick, Canada, where she arrived on 12 September. She departed on 22 September, arriving at Port Said, Egypt on 12 October and then sailing to Suez, from where she departed on 13 October for Karachi, India. Empire Dominica arrived at Karachi on 24 October, departing a week later for Lourenço Marques, Mozambique, where she arrived on 15 November. She departed on 26 November for Aden, arriving on 10 December. Departing eight days later, she arrived at Durban, South Africa on 31 December.

In 1946, Empire Dominica was sold to the India Steamship Co Ltd, Calcutta and was renamed Indian Endeavour. She served until 1966, arriving at Hong Kong for scrapping on 22 September 1966.
