= SS Sierra Ventana =

Steamship

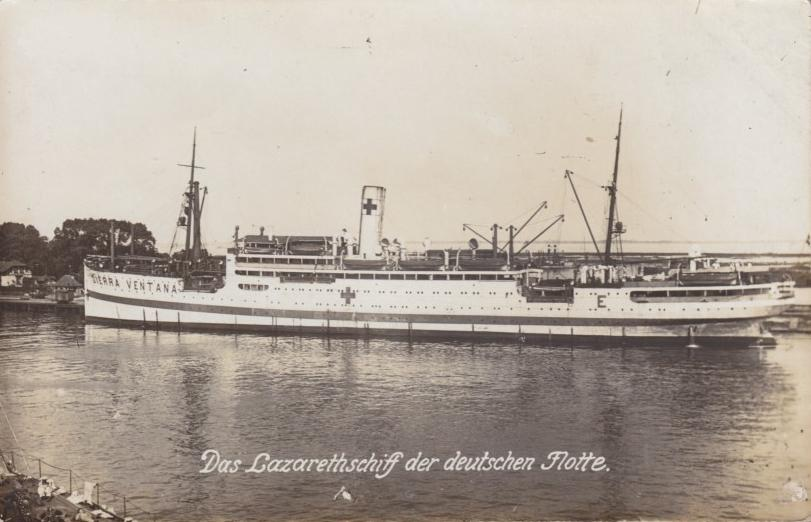
- German hospital ship Sierra Ventana

History
- Name: Sierra Ventana (1912-20); Alba (1920-26); Amérique (1926-36)
- Owner: North German Lloyd (1912-14, 1918-20); German Admiralty (1914-18); Cie. de Navigation Sud-Atlantique (1920-26); Chargeurs Réunis (1926-36)
- Builder: Bremer Vulkan AG, Vegesack
- Yard number: 559
- Launched: 12 October 1912
- Commissioned: 21 December 1912
- Maiden voyage: 18 January 1913
- In service: 1912–1936
- Fate: Scrapped in 1936

General characteristics
- Tonnage: 8,262 gross register tons (GRT)
- Length: 140.00 m (459.32 ft)
- Beam: 17.00 m (55.77 ft)
- Draught: 10.82 m (35.5 ft)
- Propulsion: Two four-cylinder triple expansion engines, twin screws
- Speed: 13 knots (24 km/h)
- Capacity: 119 first class; 74 second class; 1200 third class
- Complement: 160 crew

Sierra Ventana was a steam ship originally built for North German Lloyd in 1912, but requisitioned for use as a hospital ship during the First World War. She was then given to France as war reparations and sailed under two further names before being scrapped in 1936.

== History ==
Sierra Ventana was built at the yards of the German company Bremer Vulkan at Vegesack for North German Lloyd, one of the four-ship Sierra class for the South America run, and was launched on 12 October 1912. She set out on her maiden voyage from Bremerhaven to La Plata on 18 January 1913. Sierra Ventana was chartered by the German Admiralty on 26 August 1914 and converted into a hospital ship. On 19 November 1918 she was returned to the North German Lloyd. On 5 February 1919, she was impounded at Cherbourg while transporting former prisoners, and on 26 January 1920, transferred as reparations to France; she was operated by the Compagnie de Navigation Sud-Atlantique of Bordeaux as Alba. In 1926 she was purchased by Chargeurs Réunis and renamed Amérique; she operated on the mail run to Africa. In 1936 she was scrapped at Blyth.
