= SS Niagara =

French ocean liner (1908–1931)

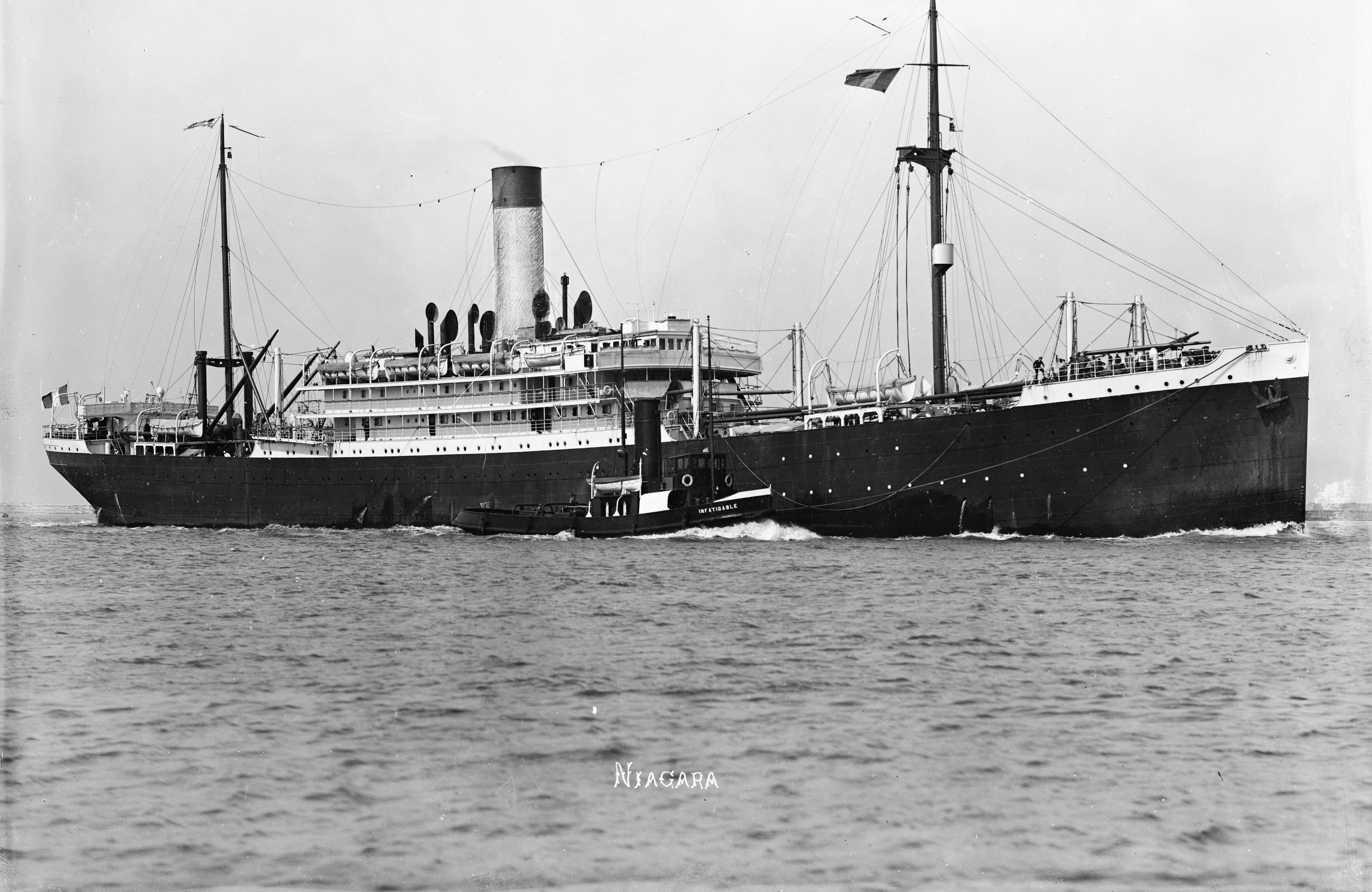

History
- Name: SS Corse (1908–1910); SS Niagara (1910–1931)
- Namesake: Niagara Falls
- Operator: Compagnie Maritime des Chargeurs Réunis (1908–1910); Compagnie Générale Transatlantique (1910–1931)
- Port of registry: Le Havre, France
- Route: Le Havre–New York City
- Builder: Ateliers et Chantiers de la Loire
- Maiden voyage: 26 March 1910 (as Niagara)
- Fate: Scrapped in 1931

General characteristics
- Type: Passenger liner
- Tonnage: 9,614 GRT
- Length: 485 feet
- Beam: 56 feet
- Propulsion: Twin-screw
- Speed: 14 1/2 knots

SS Niagara was a French passenger steamship built 1908 as the SS Corse for the Compagnie des Chargeurs Réunis. It was taken over by the Compagnie Générale Transatlantique (C.G.T. or the French Line) in 1910, and ran on the Le Havre–New York route. She was also used on the Bordeaux–New York service and the Hamburg–New York service.

On 10 April 1912, the Niagara struck an icefield and got badly damaged. Captain Juham immediately sent out an "SOS" call and called for assistance. However, after discovering that the damage was not enough to sink the ship, he called off assistance and the Niagara managed to steam under her own power to New York City, arriving there on the 17th. Four days after the incident, near the spot where the Niagara had met the icefield, the new liner RMS Titanic struck an iceberg and foundered with great loss of life.

The Niagara was scrapped in 1931 at Dunkirk.
