= Compagnie Maritime des Chargeurs Réunis =

French shipping line (1872–1981)

Chargeurs Réunis
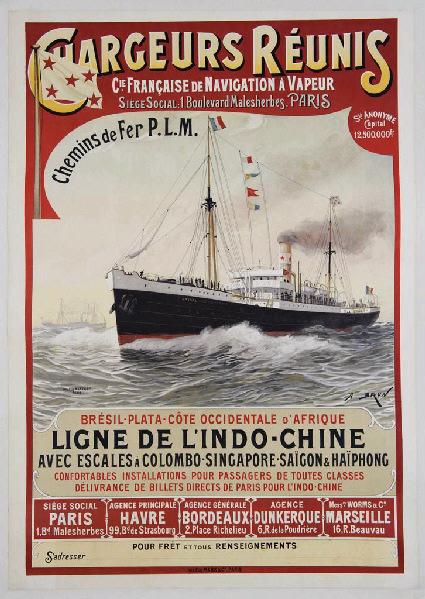
- Early 20th-century poster advertising Chargeurs Réunis' passenger liner routes, emphasising that to French Indochina via the Indian Ocean. The picture is from a painting by Alexandre Jean-Baptiste Brun.
- Industry: Shipping and transportation
- Founded: 1872; 154 years ago
- Fate: Merged to form Chargeurs SA in 1981
- Headquarters: Paris, France
- Area served: West Africa, South America, and French Indochina
- Footnotes House flag

The Compagnie Maritime des Chargeurs Réunis ('CMCR') was a French shipping company formed in 1872. Initially operating between Le Havre and the Río de la Plata, in 1883, it took over the Société Postale de l'Atlantique and started a service to West Africa. In 1894, it took over Compagnie Commerciale des Transports à Vapeur Français, giving it that company's services to New Orleans and the Gulf of Mexico.

Chargeurs operated a route to Madagascar via South Africa from 1896 to 1905, and then a round the World route from 1905 to 1911. From 1901 the company ran a route from Dunkirk to Saigon and Haiphong. From 1928 to 1931 it ran an emigrant route for the Polish government from Gdynia to Brazil and Argentina. In 1929 it started running banana boats from Africa to France. In 1946 it started a cargo service between Dakar and the United States. Chargeurs discontinued passenger services after the independence of Indochina from France in the early 1950s and the increase in air travel.

== Fleet ==
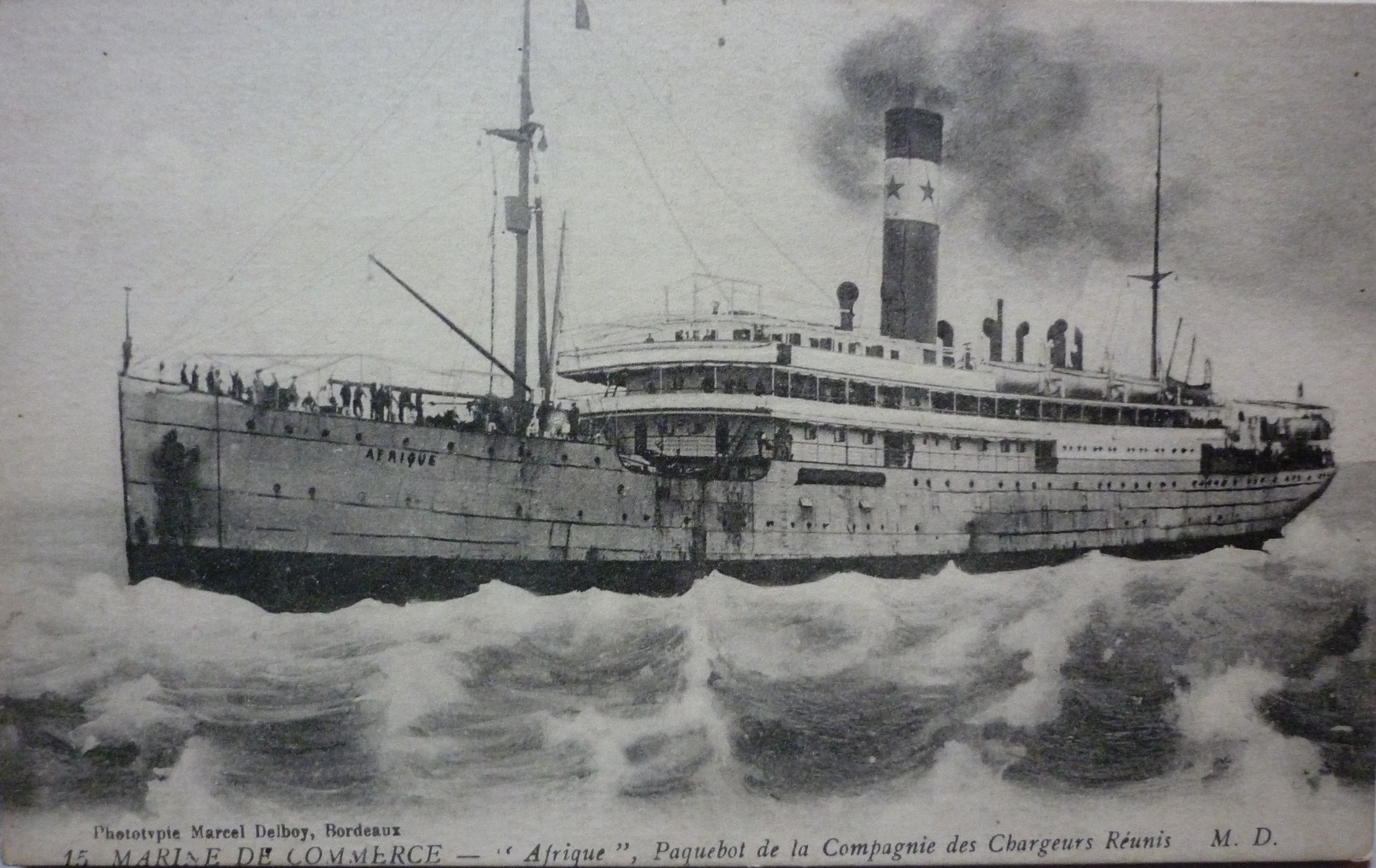
Afrique was a 5,404 GRT passenger steamship built for Chargeurs Réunis in 1907 and sunk by a storm in the Bay of Biscay in 1920 with the loss of 556 lives

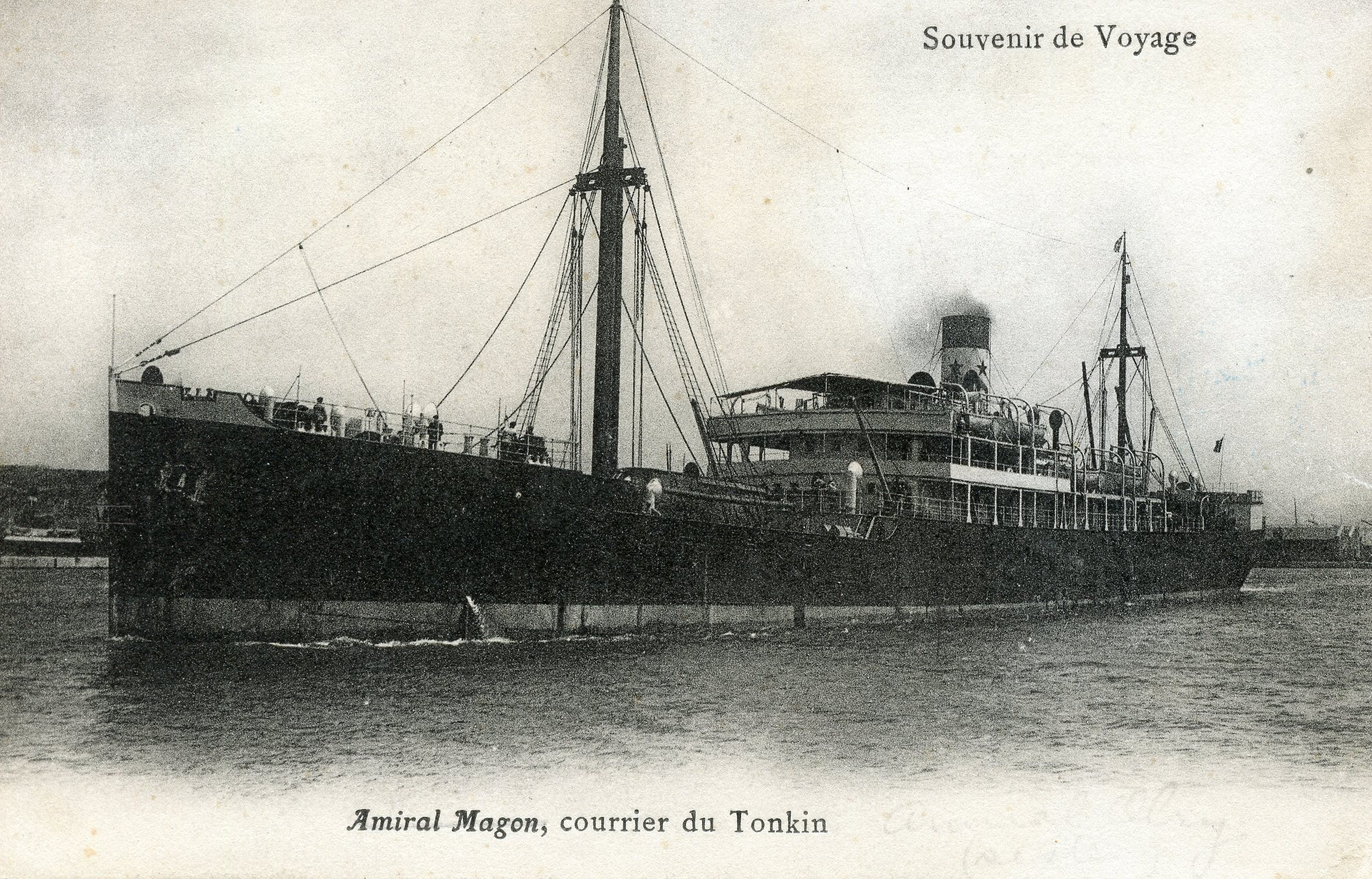
Amiral Magon

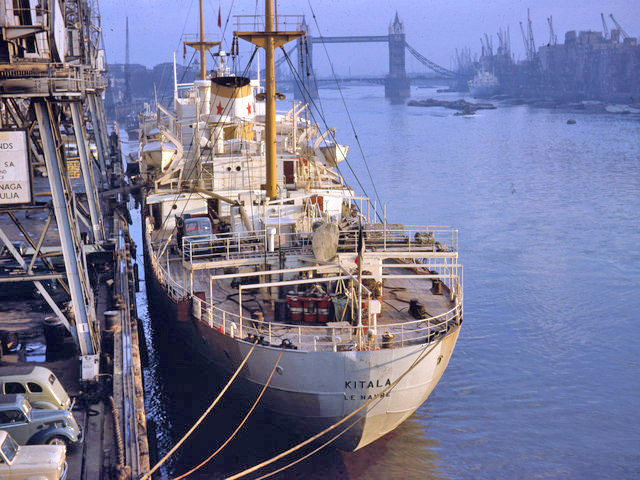
Chargeurs Réunis 4,143 GRT banana boat Kitala in the Pool of London in 1962

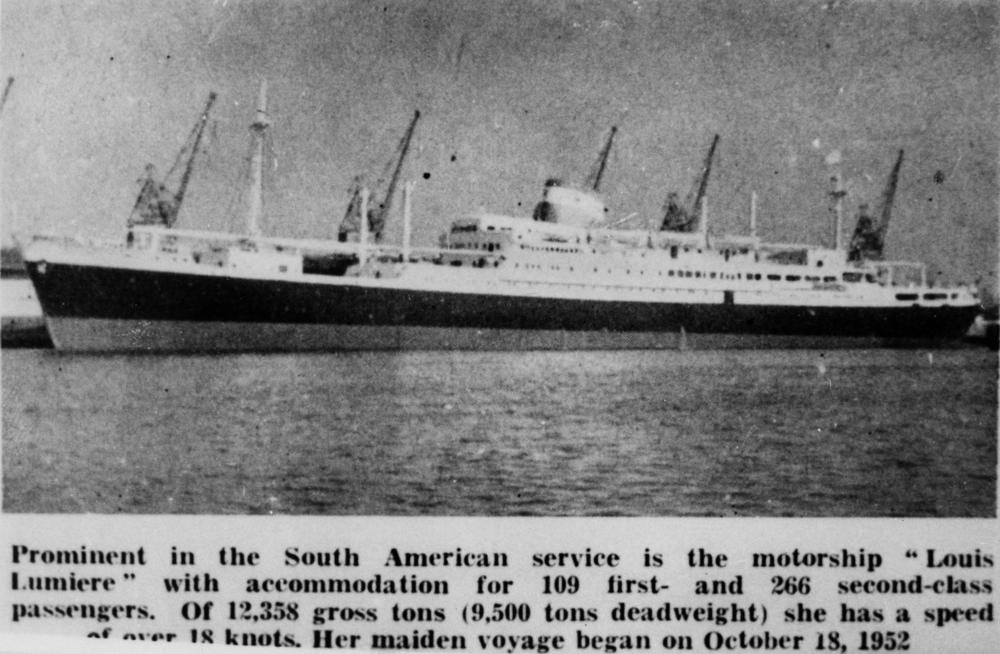
Louis Lumiere was a 12,358 GRT passenger motor ship that Chargeurs Réunis ran between France and South America from 1952 to 1962

- Adjamé
- Adrar 1920–1936
- Afrique 1907–1920
- Alba 1956–1960
- Amérique 1926–1936
- Amiral Baudin 1898–1911
- Amiral Duperré 1901-
- Amiral Exelmans 1901–1913
- Amiral Fourichon 1901–1927
- Amiral Jauréguiberry 1902–1927
- Amiral Magon 1904–1917
- Amiral Nielly 1904–1927
- Amiral Ponty 1904–1929
- Amiral Sallandrouze de la Mornay 1904–1929
- Amiral Villadret de Joyeuse 1912–1931
- Amiral Zedé 1912–1917
- Ango 1913–1940
- Ango 1966–1977
- Asie 1914–1943
- Aurigny 1917–1941
- Baccarat 1947–1954
- Bandama 1948–1951
- Bangkok 1919–1941
- Baoulé 1921–1939
- Bar le Duc 1952–1954
- Belfort 1947–1966
- Belgrano 1872–1894
- Belle Isle 1917–1943
- Beyla 1946–1967
- Bilma 1947–1961
- Boffa 1947–1968
- Boulogne sur Mer 1947–1966
- Brazza 1923–1940
- Brazza 1947–1965
- Calais 1947–1959
- California 1894–1900
- Campana 1889–1908
- Canarias 1893–1908
- Cap Saint Jacques 1921–1940
- Cap Tourane 1923–1953
- Cap Varella 1921–1942
- Caravellas 1893–1929
- Carolina 1894–1907
- Cernay 1947–55
- Ceylan
- Charles Tellier 1952–1962
- Circea 1963–1976
- Claude Bernard 1948–1956
- Comte d'Eu 1883–1888
- Cordoba 1887–1907
- Corrientes 1890–1908
- Corse
- Dahomey 1920–1942
- Daloa 1948–1972
- Désirade 1921–1950
- Dina 1967–1971
- Doba 1946–1950
- Dom-Pedro 1878–1895
- Édouard Branly 1951–1956
- Empire Glencoe 1948–1955
- Entre Rios 1887–1905
- Eubée 1921–1936
- Europe 1906–1930
- Formose 1921–1943
- Fort Archambaut 1929–1951
- Fort Binger 1929–1950
- Foucauld 1922–1940
- Foucauld 1947–1967
- Général Leclerc 1951–1965
- Gerardmer 1946–1963
- Groix 1921–1949
- Henri IV 1873–1885
- Henri Mouhon 1946–1950
- Hoedic 1922–1940
- Hassi Messaoud 1961-
- Isigny 1950–1965
- Issia 1953–1964
- Jamaïque 1928–1954
- Joinville 1969–1982
- Jouffroy d'Abbans 1923-1953 (Cap Tourane)
- Kaa 1953–1955
- Kakoulima 1933
- Kanga 1960–1971
- Katiola 1935–1943
- Kerguelen 1968–1981
- Kilissi 1934–1944
- Kitala 1957–1969
- Kolente 1933
- Koufra 1955–1969
- Krakus 1907–1934
- Le Gabon 1906–1925
- Linois 1922–1943
- Lipari 1921–1942
- Lorima 1958–1964
- Loudima 1954–1971
- Louga 1954–1971
- Louis Lumière 1951–1962
- Malte 1907-1914 (Krakus)
- Manga 1956–1961
- Maroua 1956–1961
- Montbéliard 1947–1966
- Moreno 1872-
- Mowgli 1953–1955
- Nara 1961–1972
- Ouessant 1908–1928
- Pampa 1878–1905
- Parahyba 1889–1905
- Parana 1882–1892
- Paranagua 1889–1904
- Portena 1875–1896
- Radiotélégraphiste Biard 1945–50
- Rio Negro 1883–1905
- Rivadavia 1873–1880
- Robert d'Espagne 1947–1954
- Saint Dié 1947–1965
- San Martin 1872-
- Santa Fé 1887–1906
- Surcouf 1967–1983
- Taboa 1956–1976
- Talassa 1957–1974
- Tamba 1954–1971
- Tatiana 1959–1976
- Tchad 1911–1929
- Tessa 1955–1971
- Tourville 1970–1983
- Turckheim 1947-1966
- Uruguay 1882–1901
- Ville de Bahia 1872–1890
- Ville de Ceara 1882–1895
- Ville de Maceao 1882–1908
- Ville de Maranhao 1882–1908
- Ville de Rio de Janeiro 1872-
- Ville de Santos 1872-
- Ville de Victoria 1883–1886
- Yama 1950–1968
