= SS Afrique =

French passenger ship

Coordinates: 46.28169°N 2.26103°W

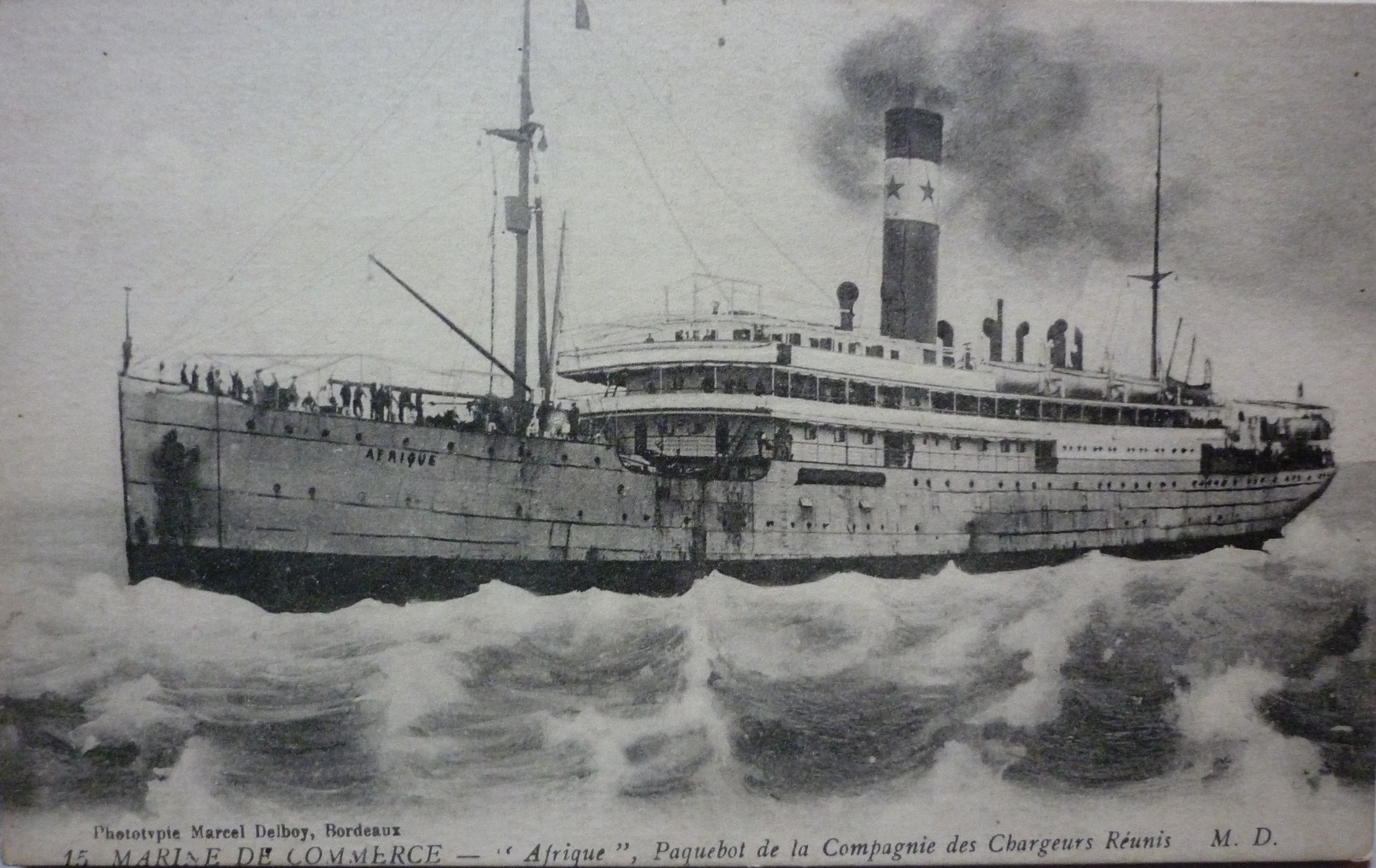

History

France
- Name: SS Afrique
- Owner: Compagnie Maritime des Chargeurs Réunis
- Builder: Swan Hunter, Wallsend
- Yard number: 801
- Launched: 20 November 1907
- Completed: April 1908
- Home port: Le Havre
- Fate: Wrecked on 12 January 1920

General characteristics
- Type: Passenger ship
- Tonnage: 5,404 gross register tons (GRT); 2,882 net register tons (NRT)
- Length: 390 ft 11 in (119.15 m)
- Beam: 48 ft (15 m)
- Installed power: 638 nhp
- Propulsion: 1x3-cyl. triple expansion engine, single shaft, 2 screws
- Speed: 17.5 knots (32.4 km/h)

SS Afrique was a passenger ship of the French shipping company Compagnie Maritime des Chargeurs Réunis, which entered service in 1907 and sank on 12 January 1920. Only 34 people survived out of the 609 on board.

== The final voyage ==
In the early morning of 10 January 1920 Afrique sailed from the Gironde estuary with 609 passengers and crew, on her usual route bound for Dakar via other ports of the French West Coast. This was her 58th voyage.

== Passengers ==
The exact number of passengers on board, remained uncertain for a long time due to the presence of African soldiers and workers in third class. It has subsequently been established that, in all classes there were 602 passengers, including 28 non-African soldiers, 192 Senegalese troops, ten civilian natives called laptots, 106 people in first class (including 19 children), 67 in second class and 81 in third class, some of whom were in steerage with the "laptots".

== Sinking ==
At about 11:58 pm on 12 January 1920, Afrique was passing between Pierre Levée and the Plateau de Rochebonne, 23 miles (42 km) from Olonne-sur-Mer, when she lost engine power in a gale. The weather made it hard to repair the engines and Afrique drifted onto a reef and went aground. The hull started to break up. The severe weather hampered rescue ships responding to her distress calls, and on 13 January 1920 at 3 o'clock, Afrique lost all contact with the other ships and sank soon after.

There were only 34 survivors from her 135 crew and 602 passengers. Only one of the passengers was amongst the survivors.

Here's another article documenting this tragedy: https://www.leparisien.fr/culture-loisirs/le-naufrage-oublie-du-titanic-francais-27-08-2016-6071793.php

== Remembrance ==
Since 2016, the Bordeaux-based association Mémoires & Partages, led by Karfa Diallo, has been campaigning for the shipwrecked African Tirailleurs to be legitimately "recognized as having died for France", after their "sacrifice" in the colonial army, and while they were returning home.

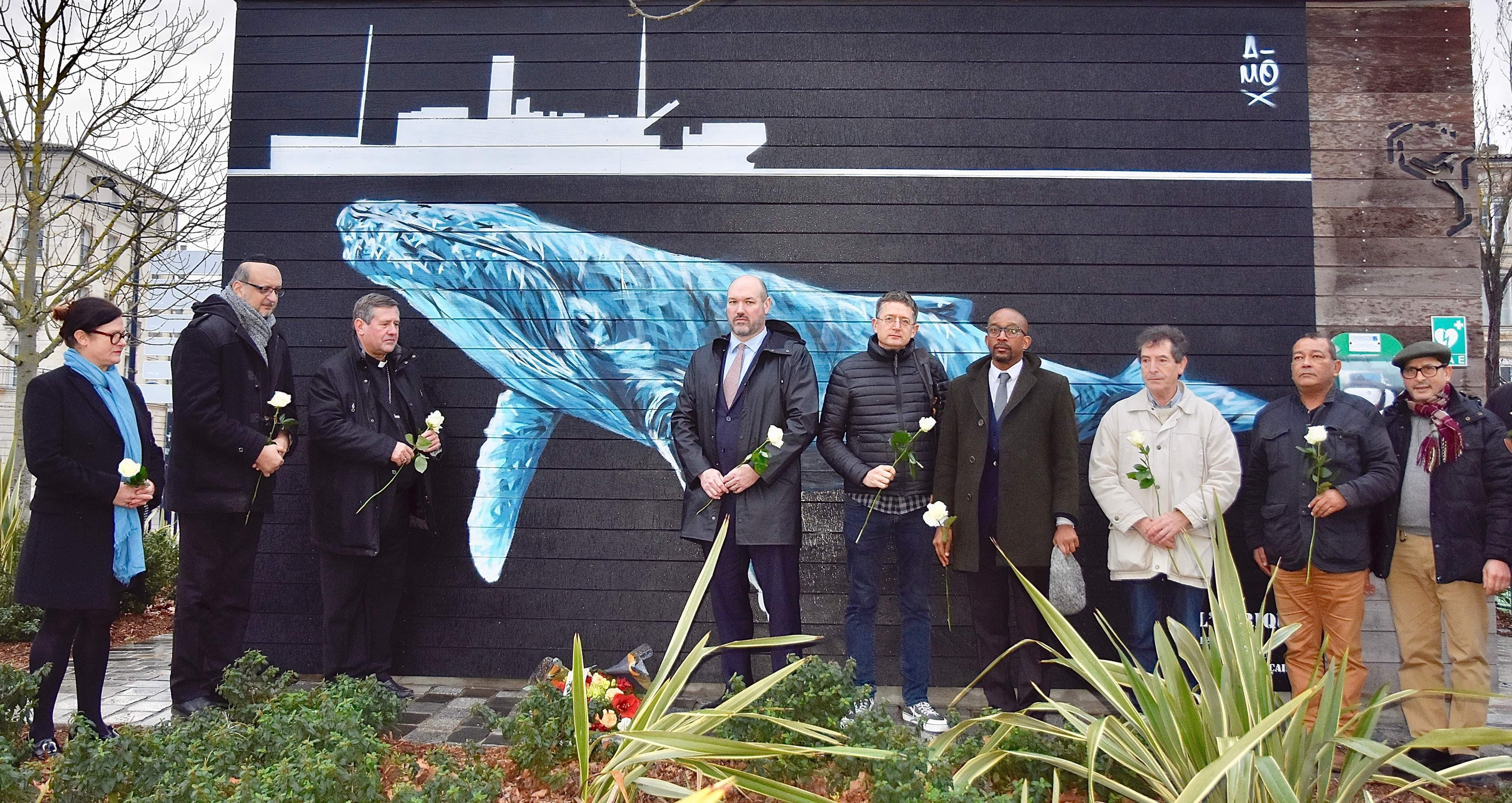
Karfa Diallo (4th from the right) at the Inauguration of the mural in memory of the shipwreck, Bordeaux, January 9, 2020.

In 2020, to mark the centenary of the shipwreck, the Mémoires & Partages association decided to organize a solemn, interfaith ceremony to open Black History Month in Bordeaux. Supported by several institutional and non-profit partners, including the Musée Mer Marine and the Nouvelle-Aquitaine Region, the ceremony took place on the Quai des Chartrons in Bordeaux. It included the unveiling of a work by Bordeaux street artist A-Mo, depicting a whale beneath the silhouette of the ocean liner. This mural was inspired by the title of the novel Le chant noir des baleines, written in 2018 by Nicolas Michel, who was also present for the commemoration.

== Sources ==
- http://www.wrecksite.eu/wreck.aspx?132499
- http://www.maritimequest.com/daily_event_archive/2006/jan/12_ss_afrique.htm

Media related to Afrique (ship, 1907) at Wikimedia Commons
