= SS Empire Bardolph =

World War II merchant ship of the United Kingdom

History
- Name: Empire Bardolph (1942–46); Memling (1946–53); Vancouver Star (1953–57); Memling (1957–59)
- Owner: MoWT (1942–46); Lamport and Holt Line Ltd (1946–53); Blue Star Line (1953–59)
- Operator: Donaldson, Brothers & Black Ltd (1943–44); Lamport and Holt Line Ltd (1944–53); Blue Star Line (1953–59)
- Port of registry: (United Kingdom) Sunderland (1943–53); (United Kingdom) UK (1953–59)
- Builder: Caledon Short Brothers Ltd, Sunderland
- Yard number: 474
- Launched: 8 December 1942
- Completed: March 1943
- Identification: UK official number 169109 (1942-59); Call sign BFDP (1943-53)

General characteristics
- Tonnage: 7,017 GRT; tonnage under deck 6,556; 4,758 NRT
- Length: 431.0 ft (131.4 m)
- Beam: 56.3 ft (17.2 m)
- Draught: 27 ft 10 in (8.48 m)
- Depth: 35.2 ft (10.7 m)
- Installed power: 537 MN
- Propulsion: 1 × triple-expansion steam engine (North East Marine Engineering Co (1938) Ltd, Newcastle upon Tyne)
- Capacity: 259,960 cubic feet (7,361 m^{3}) refrigerated cargo space
- Sensors & processing systems: wireless direction finding
- Armament: DEMS (1943–45)

Empire Bardolph was a 7,017 GRT refrigerated cargo ship which was built in 1942 for the Ministry of War Transport (MoWT). It was sold in 1946 and renamed Memling and sold again in 1953 and renamed Vancouver Star, being renamed Memling in 1957. It was scrapped in 1959.

== History ==
Empire Bardolph was built by Short Brothers Ltd, Sunderland as yard number 474. She was launched on 8 December 1942 and completed in March 1943. Empire Bardolph was built for the MoWT and initially operated under the management of Donaldson Brothers & Black Ltd. Management passed to Lamport and Holt Line Ltd in 1944 Empire Bardolph had 259,960 cubic feet (7,361 m^{3}) of refrigerated cargo space in her holds.

=== War service ===
Empire Bardolph was a member of a number of convoys during the Second World War.

SL 165

Convoy SL 162 departed Freetown, Sierra Leone on 20 July 1944 and arrived at Liverpool on 10 August. Empire Bardolph was carrying meat and general cargo.

OS 87

Convoy OS 87 departed Liverpool on 25 August 1944 and arrived at Freetown on 13 September. Empire Bardolph was bound for the River Plate.

=== Postwar ===
In 1946, Empire Bardolph was sold to Lamport and Holt Line Ltd and renamed Memling. She was one of the first two ships acquired by Lamport & Holt after the war. She was sold in 1953 to Blue Star Line and renamed Vancouver Star, being renamed Memling in 1957. On 23 October 1959, Memling arrived at Vlissingen, Netherlands for scrapping.

== Propulsion ==
She was propelled by a triple expansion steam engine which was built by North East Marine Engineering Company (1938) Ltd, Newcastle upon Tyne.

== Official number and call sign ==
Official numbers were a forerunner to IMO Numbers. Empire Bardolph had the UK official number 169109 and the Call sign BPKF.
