= USS Cacique =

Cargo ship of the United States Navy

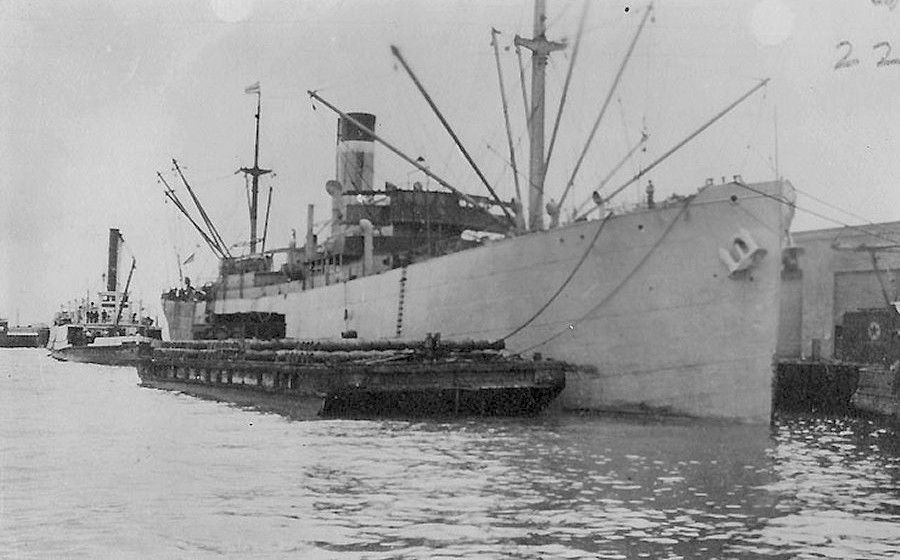
- SS Cacique in port, possibly when she was inspected by the 12th Naval District on 27 December 1917.

History

United States
- Name: USS Cacique
- Namesake: Cacique is the Spanish adaptation of an Indian word for prince or chieftain.
- Owner: New York and Pacific Steamship Company of New York City
- Builder: Short Brothers of Sunderland, England
- Christened: SS Cacique
- Completed: in 1910 at Pallion, Sunderland
- Acquired: leased by the US Navy 19 August 1918
- Commissioned: 19 August 1918 as USS Cacique (ID # 2213).
- Decommissioned: 24 March 1919 at Baltimore, Maryland
- Fate: Returned to the United States Shipping Board on 24 March 1919 for return to her owners

General characteristics
- Type: Cargo ship
- Tonnage: 6,202 GRT
- Length: 394 ft 2 in (120.14 m)
- Beam: 52 ft 3 in (15.93 m)
- Draft: 27 ft 11 in (8.51 m)
- Installed power: three-cylinder triple-expansion steam engine
- Propulsion: single screw
- Speed: 10 knots (19 km/h; 12 mph)
- Complement: 70
- Armament: 1x 5 inches (130 mm) gun mount

USS Cacique (ID-2213) was a freighter leased by the United States Navy in World War I. She was used to transport Allied personnel and cargo in support of the European fighting front. Post-war she was returned to her owners.

== Built in England ==
SS Cacique, a 6,202 Gross register ton commercial freighter, was built in 1910 by Short Brothers of Sunderland, England. She was owned by the New York and Pacific Steamship Company of New York City. On 19 August 1918 she was transferred to the Navy from the United States Shipping Board and commissioned the same day as USS Cacique (ID # 2213).

== World War I service ==
Assigned to the Naval Overseas Transportation Service, Cacique sailed from Norfolk, Virginia on 30 August 1918 to take part in supplying the United States Army in France. She made two voyages to Marseille, France with general cargo, and returned to Baltimore, Maryland on 2 March 1919.

== Post-war disposition ==
After the November 1918 Armistice with Germany Cacique was decommissioned 24 March 1919, and returned to the US Shipping Board the same day. She was then returned to her owners.
