= Nitrate Producers Steamship Company =

British steamship company

Nitrate Producers Steamship Co.
- Type: Shipping company
- Industry: Nitrate transportation
- Founded: 1895; 131 years ago
- Defunct: 1943
- Headquarters: London, England
- Area served: South America
- Key people: Sir John Latta, 1st Baronet
- Parent: Lawther, Latta & Co.

The Nitrate Producers Steamship Company, also known as the Anglo Line, was a transatlantic shipping company which was managed by Lawther, Latta & Co. Ltd. from 1895 until its disestablishment in 1943.

== History ==
The line was founded by John Latta, a Scottish businessman who founded the Lawther, Latta & Co. firm which owned the shipping line, and with the backing of John Thomas North.

The company headquarters were in 20 Billiter Buildings, London. It's cargo steamships mainly dealt with the nitrate trade in Chile and South America, taking mixed cargoes to Chile, then nitrate to the United States and cotton or other goods to Europe.

In 1913, Stanley Lord, formerly captain of the SS Californian, joined the Nitrate Steamship Company after being dismissed from his position in the Leyland Line following his inaction aboard the Californian during the night which Titanic struck an iceberg and sank. A sympathetic agent with the Leyland Line, Frank Strachan, wrote a character reference to John Latta who called Lord and offered him a position in the company which Lord accepted. He served with the line until retiring in 1927 due to failing eyesight. Lord called his time with the company the "Fourteen of my happiest years at sea".

In March 1938, one of the company's ships, the SS Anglo-Australian, disappeared without a trace in rough weather on a voyage across the Atlantic Ocean.

== Ships of the line ==
- SS Col. J. T. North
- SS Anglo-African
- SS Anglo-Australian
- SS Dunearn
- SS Anglo-Canadian
- SS Anglo-Chilean
- SS Anglo-Californian
- SS Anglo Saxon
- SS Anglo-Indian
- SS Anglo-Brazilian
- SS Anglo-Norse
