= SS Verna Paulin =

Cargo ship

History
- Name: Empire Envoy (1942–46); Cheltenham (1946–52); La Orilla (1952–55); Stallberg (1955–62); Verna Paulin (1962–69)
- Owner: Ministry of War Transport (1942–45); Ministry of Transport (1945–46); Thompson Steam Shipping Co Ltd (1946-52); Buries, Markes Ltd (1952–55); Louis Dreyfus & Co (1954–55); Stallbergs Grufve Rederi (1955–57); Rederi AB Stellvik (1957–60); Stallbergs Grufve Rederi (1960–62); Paulins Rederi AB (1962–63); Kommanditbolaget AB Paulin Chartering Oy & Co Kommandiittiyhtiö (1964–69)
- Operator: Hugh Roberts & Son Ltd (1943–46); Thompson Steam Shipping Co Ltd (1946-52); Buries, Markes Ltd (1952–55); Louis Dreyfus & Co (1954–55); Skiold & Lundberg (1955–62); Paulins Rederi AB (1962–63); Kommanditbolaget AB Paulin Chartering Oy & Co Kommandiittiyhtiö (1964–69)
- Port of registry: (United Kingdom) Sunderland, UK (1942–46); (United Kingdom) London (1946–55); Stockholm, Sweden (1955–62); Turku, Finland (1962–69)
- Builder: Short Brothers Ltd
- Yard number: 473
- Launched: 25 September 1942
- Completed: December 1942
- Maiden voyage: 3 January 1943
- Out of service: 19 July 1969
- Identification: United Kingdom Official Number 169107 (1945–57); Finnish Official Number 1412 (1962–69); Code Letters BFDF (1945–57); Code Letters OGGX (1962–69)
- Fate: Scrapped

General characteristics
- Type: Cargo ship
- Tonnage: 7,046 GRT; 4,858 NRT (as built); 4,118 NRT (1962–69); 10,280 DWT
- Length: 431 ft 0 in (131.37 m)
- Beam: 56 ft 3 in (17.15 m)
- Draught: 26 ft 9 in (8.15 m)
- Depth: 35 ft 2 in (10.72 m)
- Ice class: II (1962-69)
- Propulsion: Triple expansion steam engine driving a single screw propeller
- Speed: 11.5 knots (21.3 km/h)
- Armament: A various times during World War II, Empire Envoy was equipped with -; 1 × 4-inch or 4.7 inch gun; 4 × Bofors guns; 2 or 7 x machine guns; kites; anti-torpedo nets

Verna Paulin was a 7,046 GRT cargo ship that was built in 1942 as Empire Envoy by Short Brothers Ltd, Sunderland, Co Durham, United Kingdom for the Ministry of War Transport (MoWT). She was sold into merchant service in 1946 and renamed Cheltenham. A further sale in 1952 saw her renamed La Orilla. A sale to a Swedish company in 1955 saw her renamed Stallberg. In 1958, she was sold to a Finnish company and renamed Verna Paulin. She served until 1969, when she was scrapped.

== Description ==
The ship was built in 1942 by Short Brothers Ltd, Sunderland, Co Durham. She was yard number 473.

The ship was 431 feet 0 inches (131.37 m) long, with a beam of 56 feet 4 inches (17.17 m). She had a depth of 35 feet 2 inches (10.72 m), and a draught of 26 feet 9 inches (8.15 m). She was assessed at 7,046 GRT, 4,858 NRT, 10,280 DWT.

The ship was propelled by a 510 nhp triple expansion steam engine, which had cylinders of 24 1/2 inches (62 cm), 39 inches (99 cm) and 70 inches (180 cm) diameter by 48 inches (120 cm) stroke. The engine was built by North East Marine Engine Co (1938) Ltd, Newcastle upon Tyne. It could propel the ship at a speed of 11.5 knots (21.3 km/h).

== History ==
=== World War II ===
Empire Envoy was built for the MoWT. She was placed under the management of the Buries, Markes Ltd, London. The United Kingdom Official Number 169107 and Code Letters were allocated. Her port of registry was Sunderland.

Empire Envoy made her maiden voyage on 3 January 1943, when she sailed from Sunderland to join Convoy FN 907, which had departed from Southend, Essex the previous day and arrived at Methil, Fife on 4 January. She then joined Convoy EN 181, which departed on 5 January and arrived at Loch Ewe on 7 January. She proceeded to the Clyde, arriving the next day. Empire Envoy was a member of Convoy ON 161, which departed from Liverpool, Lancashire on 12 January and arrived at New York, United States on 31 January. She was fitted with anti-torpedo nets. During the nights of 23–24 and 24–25 January, she was one of ten ships which straggled behind the convoy in a gale. Her captain criticized the Convoy Commodore's handling of the convoy in a letter to the MoWT. The convoy had been kept on its intended course and speed despite a severe gale springing up. Although Empire Envoy was making 11.5 knots (21.3 km/h), she was unable to keep up with the convoy. As no rendezvous point had been given, she put into St. John's, Newfoundland for orders, which resulted in a delay. She arrived at St. John's on 27 January, sailing four days later for Halifax, Nova Scotia, Canada, where she arrived on 3 February. Empire Envoy sailed on 2 March to join Convoy HX 228, which departed from New York on 28 February and arrived at Liverpool on 15 March. She was carrying a cargo of grain and flour, there were also a number of passengers on board. She joined the convoy on 4 March at 44°14′N 57°24′W. She was bound for the Clyde, where she arrived on 15 March.

Empire Envoy departed on 15 April to join Convoy OS46KM, which departed from Liverpool on 15 April and split at sea on 24 April, forming convoys OS 46 and KMS 13. OS 46 arrived at Freetown, Sierra Leone on 3 May. Empire Envoy was in the part of the convoy that formed KMS 13 and arrived at Gibraltar on 26 April. Her armament consisted a 4-inch or 4.7-inch gun, four Bofors guns, two machine guns, kites and anti-torpedo nets. She was carrying a cargo of stores and ammunition bound for Bône, Algeria. Convoy KMS 13 departed from Gibraltar on 26 April and arrived at Bône on 29 April. Empire Envoy was stated to be bound for Bougie, Algeria, but she arrived at Algiers on 28 April, sailing on 2 May for Bône, where she arrived the next day. She departed on 20 May for Algiers, arriving the next day and then sailing for Oran, where she arrived on 21 May. She sailed the next day for Gibraltar, arriving on 23 May. She sailed on 28 May to join Convoy OS 48, which formed at sea on 29 May and arrived at Freetown on 7 June. She departed on 11 June as a member of Convoy ST 69, which arrived at Takoradi, Gold Coast on 16 June. She detached from the convoy and sailed to Rio de Janeiro, Brazil, arriving on 27 June. Empire Envoy departed on 19 July for Freetown, where she arrived on 4 August. Empire Envoy was a member of Convoy SL 135, which departed on 14 August and rendezvoused at sea with Convoy MKS 22 on 26 August. The combined convoys arrived at Liverpool on 6 September. She was carrying a cargo of manganese ore and two passengers, bound for the Barry Roads. She sailed on to Cardiff, Glamorgan arriving on 7 September.

Empire Envoy was a member of Convoy OS 56KM, which departed from Liverpool on 7 October and split on 18 October, forming Convoy OS 56 and KMS 29. OS 56 arrived at Freetown on 29 October. Empire Envoy was in the part of the convoy which formed KMS 29 and arrived at Gibraltar on 20 October. She was carrying a cargo of aircraft and ammunition. She was bound for Aden, then Basra and Bandar Shapur, Iraq. Her armament consisted a 4-inch or 4.7-inch gun and seven machine guns. Convoy KMS 29 departed from Gibraltar on 20 October and arrived at Port Said, Egypt on 31 October. Empire Envoy departed that day for Suez, arriving the next day. She departed two days later for Aden, where she arrived on 7 November. She then joined Convoy AP 52, which departed on 10 November and arrived at Bandar Abbas, Iran on 17 November. She then sailed to Hormuz, from where she departed that day for Basra, arriving three days later. Empire Envoy then sailed to Abadan, from where she departed on 27 December for Bahrain, arriving on 1 January 1944.

Empire Envoy sailed form Bahrain on 12 January for Karachi India, arriving on 25 January. She departed on 11 February for Durban, South Africa, where she arrived on 27 February. She was a member of Convoy DKA 15, which sailed on 11 March and arrived at Aden on 1 April. She sailed that day for Port Said, arriving on 8 April and departing ten days later for Suez, where she arrived on 19 April. Empire Envoy sailed on 21 April for Aden, arriving on 26 April and sailing three days later for Mombasa, Kenya, where she arrived on 8 May. She sailed the next day for Lourenço Marques, Mozambique, arriving on 16 May. She departed on 8 June to join Convoy DKA 19, which had departed from Durban on 6 June and arrived at Aden on 25 June. She left the convoy at Kilindini, Kenya, on 17 June and sailed to Mombasa. Empire Envoy departed on 28 June for Durban, arriving on 7 July. She sailed on 16 August for Cape Town, arriving three days later and sailing on 20 August. She returned to Cape Town on 25 August, sailing on 2 September for Buenos Aires, Argentina, where she arrived on 18 September. She sailed on 28 September, making a return trip to Rosario and arriving back at Buenos Aires on 1 October. She sailed on 16 October for Freetown, arriving on 4 November. Empire Envoy was a member of Convoy SL 176, which departed on 7 November and rendezvoused at sea with Convoy MKS 67 on 18 November. MKS 67 had departed from Gibraltar on 17 November. The combined convoys arrived at Liverpool on 24 November. Empire Envoy was carrying a cargo of wheat and two passengers. She arrived at Avonmouth, Somerset on 25 November.

Empire Envoy departed on 7 December for Newport, Monmouthshire, arriving that day. She sailed on 17 December for Milford Haven, Pembrokeshire, arriving two days later. She departed on 25 December to join Convoy ON 274, which had sailed from Southend on 23 December and arrived at New York on 8 January 1945. She was fitted with anti-torpedo nets for this voyage. She left the convoy at Halifax on 6 January. Empire Envoy sailed on 6 March to join Convoy HX 342, which had departed from New York on 4 March and arrived at Liverpool on 19 March. She was carrying general cargo. She left the convoy and proceeded to The Downs, off the coast of Kent, arriving on 20 March.

Empire Envoy departed from The Downs on 12 April to join Convoy ON 296, which departed from Liverpool that day and arrived at New York on 30 April. Her destination was a port in Quebec, Canada and she was fitted with anti-torpedo nets. She arrived at Sydney, Cape Breton, Nova Scotia on 29 April, sailing on 5 May for an unrecorded destination.

=== Post-war ===
On 9 June 1945, Empire Envoy departed from Cape Chatte, Quebec, for Sydney, where she arrived on 11 June. She sailed four days later for Southend, arriving on 27 June. She sailed the next day for Grangemouth, Stirlingshire, arriving on 30 June. She departed on 4 August for Saint John, New Brunswick, Canada arriving on 17 August and sailing on 8 September for Port Said, where she arrived on 29 September. Empire Envoy then sailed to Suez, from where she departed on 30 September for Bombay, arriving on 12 October. She departed three days later for Karachi, arriving on 18 October and sailing on 24 October for Lourenço Marques, where she arrived on 8 November. She sailed on 15 November for Colombo, Ceylon, arriving on 3 December.

In 1946, Empire Envoy was sold to the Thompson Steam Shipping Co Ltd, London and was renamed Cheltenham. In 1952, Cheltenham was sold to Buries, Markes Ltd, London and was renamed La Orilla. She was transferred in 1954 to Louis Dreyfus & Co, the French owners of Buries, Markes. In 1955, La Orilla was sold to Stallbergs Grufve Rederi, Stockholm, Sweden and renamed Stallberg. She was placed under the management of Skiold & Lundberg AB, whose management she was to remain under whilst flying the Swedish Flag. In 1957, Stallberg was sold to Rederi AB Stellvik, Stockholm, being resold to Stallbergs Grufve Rederi in 1960. In 1962, Stallberg was sold to Paulins Rederi AB, Turku, Finland and renamed Verna Paulina. The Finnish Official Number 1412 and Code Letters OGGX were allocated and she was assessed as Ice Class II and 4,118 NRT. From 1962–63, her draught was recorded as 20 feet 9 inches (6.32 m), reverting to 26 feet 9 inches (8.15 m) from 1964, in which year she was sold to Kommanditbolaget AB Paulin Chartering Oy & Co. On 25 February 1964, a crewman on Verna Paulin was injured in a fall whilst the ship was in the vicinity of Souda Bay, Greece. USS Enterprise answered her call for assistance. A surgeon from Enterprise was transferred to Verna Paulin by helicopter. She served until 1969, arriving on 19 July at Bruges, Belgium for scrapping.
