= SS Inchmay (1943) =

Cargo liner

History
- Name: Empire Cromer (1943-46); Corrientes (1946-55); Inchmay (1955-66); Kaukhali (1966-68)
- Owner: Ministry of War Transport (1943-45); Ministry of Transport (1945-46); Donaldson Line (1946-54); Blue Star Line (1954-55); Williamson & Co Ltd (1955-66); National Shipping Corporation of Pakistan (1966-68)
- Operator: Blue Star Line (1943-46); Donaldson Line (1946-54); Blue Star Line (1954-55); Inch Steamship Co Ltd (1955-66); National Shipping Corporation of Pakistan (1966-68)
- Port of registry: (United Kingdom) Sunderland. UK (1943-46); (United Kingdom) Glasgow (1946-55); Hong Kong (1955-66); Karachi, Pakistan (1966-68)
- Builder: Short Brothers Ltd
- Way number: 480
- Launched: 21 December 1943
- Completed: April 1944
- Out of service: 1966
- Identification: United Kingdom Official Number 180133 (1943-55); Code Letters GFPT (1943-55)
- Fate: Scrapped

General characteristics
- Class & type: Refrigerated cargo liner
- Tonnage: 7,058 GRT
- Length: 431 ft 0 in (131.37 m)
- Beam: 56 ft 3 in (17.15 m)
- Draught: 26 ft 9 in (8.15 m)
- Depth: 35 ft 2 in (10.72 m)
- Propulsion: Triple expansion steam engine
- Speed: 10 knots (19 km/h)
- Complement: 45 (Inchmay)

Inchmay was a 7,058 GRT refrigerated cargo liner that was built in 1943 by Short Brothers Ltd, Sunderland, Co Durham, United Kingdom as Empire Cromer for the Ministry of War Transport (MoWT). In 1946, she was sold into merchant service and renamed Corrientes. In 1955 she was sold to Hong Kong and renamed Inchmay. In 1966, she was sold to Pakistan and renamed Kaukhali, serving until 1966 when she was scrapped.

== Description ==
The ship was built in 1943 by Short Brothers Ltd, Sunderland, Yard number 480, she was launched on 21 December 1943 and completed in April 1944.

The ship was 431 feet 0 inches (131.37 m) long, with a beam of 56 feet 3 inches (17.15 m). She had a depth of 35 feet 2 inches (10.72 m), and a draught of 26 feet 9 inches (8.15 m). She was assessed at 7,058 GRT, 4,756 NRT.

The ship was propelled by a 537 nhp triple expansion steam engine, which had cylinders of 24 1/2 inches (62 cm), 39 inches (99 cm) and 70 inches (180 cm) diameter by 48 inches (120 cm) stroke. The engine was built by the North East Marine Engine Co (1938) Ltd, Newcastle upon Tyne. It could propel the ship at 10 knots (19 km/h).

== History ==
=== War service ===
Empire Cromer was built for the MoWT. The United Kingdom Official Number 180133 and Code Letters GFPT were allocated. Her port of registry was Sunderland. She was operated under the management of the Blue Star Line.

Empire Cromer was complete in April 1944. She made her maiden voyage on 28 April, when she joined Convoy FN 1340, which had departed Southend, Essex on 27 April and arrived at Methil, Fife on 29 April. She then joined Convoy EN 377, which departed Methil that day and arrived at Loch Ewe on 1 May. Empire Cromer then sailed on to Belfast, County Antrim and made a voyage to Cardiff, Glamorgan and back before joining Convoy ON 238, which departed from Liverpool, Lancashire on 26 May and arrived at New York United States on 9 June. She detached from the convoy en route and sailed to Montreal, Quebec, Canada, arriving on 8 June.

Empire Cromer was a member of Convoy QS 88, which departed from the Red Islet on 30 August and arrived at Sydney, Cape Breton on 3 September. She then joined Convoy HX 306, which had departed from New York on 31 August and arrived at Liverpool on 17 September. She was carrying general cargo and meat. After discharging her cargo, Empire Cromer sailed to Milford Haven, Pembrokeshire, from where she sailed on 4 October, joining Convoy OS91KM, which departed from Liverpool that day and split at sea on 10 October. She was carrying a cargo of soda and livestock. Her destination was Buenos Aires, Argentina, where she arrived on 30 October. From Buenos Aires, Empire Cromer sailed to Montevideo, Uruguay, Freetown, Sierra Leone and Gibraltar, where she arrived on 15 December. She then joined Convoy MKS 71G, which departed from Gibraltar on 16 December and arrived at Liverpool on 24 December. She was carrying a cargo of meat. Her destination was the Clyde.

Empire Cromer departed the Clyde on 23 January 1945, joining Convoy ON 280, which had departed from Southend on 22 January and arrived at New York on 9 February. From New York, she sailed to Boston, Massachusetts, joining convoy BX 150, which departed on 13 March and arrived at Halifax, Nova Scotia on 15 March. She then joined Convoy SC 170, which departed from Halifax on 17 March and arrived at Liverpool on 31 March. She was carrying refrigerated and general cargo. From Liverpool, Empire Cromer sailed to the Belfast Lough, from where she joined Convoy ONS 48, which departed from Liverpool on 21 April and arrived at Halifax on 4 May. She then joined Convoy XB 162, which departed from Halifax the next day and arrived at Boston on 7 May. She arrived at the Cape Cod Canal on 7 May and then sailed to New York.

=== Post-war service ===
Empire Cromer departed from New York on 21 May 1945 for Boston, arriving the next day. She then joined Convoy BX 164, which departed that day and arrived at Halifax on 24 May. She then joined Convoy SC 177, which departed Halifax on 26 May and arrived at Liverpool on 8 June. She was carrying refrigerated and general cargo, and was bound for Cardiff. She then sailed to Halifax and back to Liverpool, arriving there on 1 August.

On 27 August, Empire Cromer sailed from Liverpool for Buenos Aires. She then sailed to Zarate and back. From Buenos Aires, she sailed to Montevideo. She then sailed to Port Stanley, Falkland Islands, where she embarked fourteen members of the Falkland Islands Defence Force who were to represent the Islands at the 1946 Victory Parade in London. Empire Cromer sailed to Antwerp, Belgium and then to Liverpool, where she arrived on 29 November.

In 1946, Empire Cromer was sold to the Donaldson Line, Glasgow and renamed Corrientes, the second ship of that name to serve with Donaldson Line. In 1954, Corrientes was sold to the Blue Star Line. It was intended that she would be renamed Oakland Star, but instead she was declared surplus to requirements. In January 1955, Corrientes was sold to Williamson & Co Ltd, Hong Kong and renamed Inchmay. She was operated under the management of the Inch Line. On 3 April 1962, Inchmay ran aground at Wakayama, Japan. There were no injuries amongst her 45 crew. In 1966, Inchmay was sold to the National Shipping Corporation of Pakistan, Karachi and was renamed Kaukhali. She served until 1968, arriving on 2 April at Karachi for scrapping.
