= SS Empire Driver =

World War II merchant ship of the United Kingdom

History
- Name: Empire Driver (1942–45); Radiotélégraphiste Biard (1945–50); Dea Mazzella (1950–56); Maria Mazzella (1956–60); Falzarego (1960–64); Grazia Prima (1964–65); Missouri (1965–69)
- Owner: Ministry of War Transport (1942–45); French Government (1945–50); Pasquale Mazzella (1950–60); Pala and Franchescini (1960–64); Società per Azioni Costanza (1964–65); Luzmar SA (1965–69)
- Operator: Watts, Watts & Co Ltd (1942–45); Compagnie des Chargeurs Reunis (1945–50); Pasquale Mazzella (1950–60); Pala and Franchescini (1960–64); Società per Azioni Costanza (1964–65); Luzmar SA (1965–69)
- Port of registry: (United Kingdom) West Hartlepool, UK (1942–45); Le Havre, France (1945–50); Naples, Italy (1950–60); (Italy) Genoa (1960–65); Monrovia, Liberia (1965–69)
- Builder: William Gray & Co Ltd
- Yard number: 1137
- Launched: 24 September 1942
- Completed: November 1942
- Out of service: 8 February 1969
- Identification: United Kingdom Official Number 168917 (1942–45); Code Letters BFDG (1945–46)
- Fate: Scrapped

General characteristics
- Type: Cargo ship
- Tonnage: 7,042 GRT; 4,850 NRT; 10,300 DWT
- Length: 431 ft 5 in (131.50 m)
- Beam: 56 ft 2 in (17.12 m)
- Draught: 26 ft 9 in (8.15 m)
- Depth: 35 ft 2 in (10.72 m)
- Propulsion: Triple expansion steam engine

Empire Driver was a 7,042 GRT cargo ship that was built in 1942 by William Gray & Co Ltd, West Hartlepool, Co Durham, United Kingdom for the Ministry of War Transport (MoWT). In 1945, she was transferred to the French Government and renamed Radiotélégraphiste Biard. She was sold to an Italian company in 1950 and renamed Dea Mazzella. In 1956, she was renamed Maria Mazzella. Further sales in 1960 and 1964 saw her renamed Falzarego and Grazia Prima respectively. In 1965, she was sold to Liberia and renamed Missouri. She served until 1969 when she was scrapped.

== Description ==
The ship was built in 1942 by William Gray & Co Ltd, West Hartlepool. She was yard number 1137.

The ship was 431 feet 5 inches (131.50 m) long, with a beam of 56 feet 2 inches (17.12 m). She had a depth of 35 feet 2 inches (10.72 m) and a draught of 26 feet 9 inches (8.15 m). She was assessed at 7,042 GRT. 4,860 NRT. Her DWT was 10,300.

The ship was propelled by a 510 nhp triple expansion steam engine, which had cylinders of 24 1/2 inches (62 cm), 39 inches (99 cm) and 70 inches (180 cm) diameter by 48 inches (120 cm) stroke. The engine was built by Harland & Wolff Ltd, Glasgow.

== History ==
=== World War II ===
Empire Driver was launched on 24 September 1942 and completed in November. The United Kingdom Official Number 168917 and Code Letters BDFV were allocated. Her port of registry was West Hartlepool and she was placed under the management of Watts, Watts & Co Ltd.

Empire Driver arrived at Middlesbrough, Yorkshire on 24 November 1942. She departed on 15 December to join Convoy FN 891, which had departed from Southend, Essex the previous day and arrived at Methil, Fife on 16 December. She then joined Convoy EN 175, which departed on 19 December and arrived at Loch Ewe on 21 December. She then sailed to the Clyde, arriving on 23 December. Three days later, Empire Driver departed the Clyde for Milford Haven, Pembrokeshire, where she arrived on 28 December.

Empire Driver was a member of Convoy KX 8, which departed from Milford Haven on 3 January 1943 and dispersed at sea at 05°47′N 15°23′W on 21 January. She was carrying a cargo of petrol and stores bound for Gibraltar, where she arrived on 13 January. She departed from Gibraltar on 18 January, joining convoy KMS 7G, which had departed from the Clyde on 7 January and arrived at Algiers, Algeria on 21 January. Empire Driver was a member of Convoy MKS 7, which departed from Algiers on 5 February and arrived at Liverpool, Lancashire on 17 February. Her destination was the Clyde, where she arrived that day.

Empire Driver was a member of Convoy KMS 11G, which departed from the Clyde on 14 March and arrived at Bône, Algeria on 28 March. She left the convoy at Algiers, arriving on 27 March. On 3 April, she joined Convoy TE 20, which had departed from Gibraltar on 1 April and arrived at Bône on 4 April. Empire Driver departed from Bône on 15 April and arrived at Gibraltar on 20 April. She sailed three days later to join Convoy OS 46, which had departed from Liverpool on 15 April as a combined convoy, OS 46 and KMS 13, the convoy separated at sea on 24 April. KMS 13 sailing to Gibraltar, where it arrived on 26 April; and OS 46 sailing to Freetown, Sierra Leone, where it arrived on 3 May.

Empire Driver departed from Freetown on 10 May for Montevideo, Uruguay, arriving on 28 May and departing that day for Buenos Aires, Argentina, where she arrived the next day. On 17 June, she departed from Buenos Aires for Cape Town, South Africa via Montevideo, arriving on 10 July. She sailed four days later for Port Elizabeth, from where she departed on 19 July for Mombasa, Kenya, arriving on 6 August. Empire Driver departed that day for Aden, arriving on 12 August and departing three days later for Suez, Egypt, where she arrived on 22 August. She departed on 21 September for Jeddah, Saudi Arabia, arriving three days later and departing on 25 September for Massawa, Eritrea, where she arrived on 27 September. On 6 October, Empire Driver departed from Massawa for Aden, arriving two days later. She then joined Convoy AKD 3, which departed on 10 October and arrived at Durban, South Africa on 29 October. She left the convoy at Lourenço Marques, Mozambique on 28 October. She departed from Lourenço Marques on 7 November for Port Louis, Mauritius, arriving a week later. On 7 December, Empire Driver departed from Port Louis for Aden, arriving on 19 December and sailing two days later for Suez, where she arrived on 27 December. She then sailed to Port Said, from where she sailed on 31 December for Haifa, Palestine, arriving on 1 January 1944.

Empire Driver departed from Haifa on 7 January for Port Said, arriving three days later. She then sailed to Suez, from where she sailed on 11 January for Aden, arriving on 16 January. She departed two days later for Lourenço Marques, where she arrived on 31 January. On 12 February, Empire Driver departed from Lourenço Marques for Cape Town, where she arrived on 17 January, departing the next day for Buenos Aires, which was reached on 7 March. She departed on 16 March for Rosario, arriving the next day and departing four days later for Buenos Aires, where she arrived on 22 March. She departed on 28 March for Freetown, where she arrived on 15 April. Empire Driver was a member of Convoy SL 156, which departed from Freetown on 21 April and rendezvoused at sea with Convoy MKS 47 on 3 May. She returned to Freetown for defects to be rectified. Defects rectified, she joined Convoy SL 157, which departed on 1 May and rendezvoused at sea with Convoy MKS 48 on 11 May. Empire Driver was carrying a cargo of linseed and cased meats. The combined convoy arrived at Liverpool on 22 May. Her stated destination was the Clyde, but she sailed to Loch Ewe to join Convoy WN 586, which arrived at Methil on 24 May. She departed four days later as a member of Convoy FS 1466, which arrived at Southend on 30 May.

Empire Driver departed from Southend on 11 June for Loch Ewe via the Tyne, which was reached on 18 June via convoys FN 1385, FN 1837 and EN 397. She then joined Convoy ON 241, which had departed from Liverpool on 18 June and arrived at New York on 2 July. She departed from New York on 21 July for the Hampton Roads, Virginia, where she arrived two days later. Empire Driver was a member of Convoy UGS 50, which departed from the Hampton Roads on 3 August and arrived at Port Said on 29 August. She left the convoy at Augusta, Italy, arriving on 25 August. The next day, she sailed to Naples as a member of Convoy VN 61, arriving on 27 August.

Empire Driver departed from Naples on 3 October 1944 for Algiers, arriving two days later and departing the day after that for Casablanca, Morocco, where she arrived on 8 October. She departed on 17 October to join Convoy UGS 56, which had departed from the Hampton Roads on 2 October and arrived at Port Said on 28 October. She then sailed to Suez, from where she departed on 5 November for Aden, arriving on 11 November and sailing two days later for Albany, Australia. Arrival there was on 11 December and Empire Driver sailed the next day for Wallaroo, where she arrived on 17 December. She departed on 21 December for Adelaide, arriving the next day.

Empire Driver departed from Adelaide on 6 January 1945 for Fremantle, arriving on 12 January and departing eight days later for Geraldton, where she arrived on 21 January. She departed from Geraldton on 27 January for Colombo, Ceylon, arriving on 13 February and departing the next day for Karachi, India, where she arrived on 21 February. She departed on 5 March for Cape Town, arriving on 28 March and sailing two days later for Rosario, where she arrived on 18 April. Empire Driver departed from Rosario on 24 April for Buenos Aires, arriving the next day.

=== Post-war ===
Empire Driver departed from Buenos Aires on 10 May for Pernambuco, Brazil, arriving on 30 May. She departed on 10 June for Gibraltar, from where she departed on 29 June for London, arriving on 7 July. By 14 August 1945, Empire Driver had been transferred to the French Government and renamed Radiotélégraphiste Biard. She was named for Victor Biard, the radio operator on the British merchant ship Djurdjura, which was torpedoed and sunk by the Italian submarine Brin on 13 June 1941. She was placed under the management of Compagnie Maritime des Chargeurs Réunis, Le Havre, Seine-Maritime.

In 1950, Radiotélégraphiste Biard was sold to Pasquale Mazzella, Naples and renamed Dea Mazzella. In May 1951, Dea Mazzella was caught up in industrial action by the Ship Painters' and Dockers' Union at Melbourne. The dockers had blacked certain New Zealand-flagged ships in support of striking dockworkers from that country. Dea Mazzella was berthed by two tugs crewed by the Royal Australian Navy and was loaded by Royal Australian Air Force personnel. On 11 July 1956, Dea Mazzella was in collision with the Panamanian Liberty ship Estoril, which sank at 42°50′N 61°00′W. Later that year, she was renamed Maria Mazzella.

In 1960, Maria Mazzella was sold to Pala & Franchescini, Genoa and renamed Falzarego. A further sale in 1964 to Società per Azioni Costanza, Genoa saw her renamed Grazia Prima. In 1965, she was sold to Luzmar SA, Liberia and renamed Missouri. She served until 1969, arriving on 8 February at Santander, Spain for scrapping.
