= Short Brothers of Sunderland =

British shipbuilding company

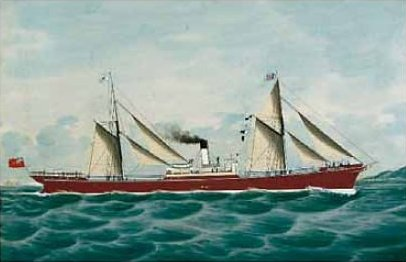
Ritratto della steam ship Magnus Mail in navigazione, painted in 1895 by Antonio Luzzo. Short Brothers built SS Magnus Mail in 1889.

Short Brothers Limited was a British shipbuilding company formed in 1850 and based at Pallion, Sunderland since 1869. The company closed in 1964 when it failed to invest to build bigger ships.

== 19th century ==
In 1850 George Short founded a shipyard at Hylton to build small wooden ships for local users. In 1860 Short moved the yard downriver to Pallion and his four sons became partners in the business. In 1871 the yard built its first iron-hulled ship the High Stretfield and the company started using the name Short Brothers. John Y Short became a distinguished naval architect and at the 1878 Paris Exhibition he was awarded a gold medal.

In 1883 Short's built a cargo liner for James Knott's Prince Line of Newcastle upon Tyne. This was the beginning of a 35-year relationship in which Short's supplied Prince Line with a total of 37 ships. They included the passenger liner SS Spartan Prince, built in 1897, which spent its early years of service carrying thousands of Italian migrants to the USA.

In 1895 John Y Short made a substantial investment in John Thomas North's Nitrate Producers Steamship Company Ltd ("Anglo Line"). Short's went on to supply the line with 30 ships, starting with SS Colonel J.T. North and continuing until at least 1929.

From 1897 Short's undertook contract work for several Tyneside shipyards. In 1900 John Y Short died, his brother Joseph took over and the business was converted from a partnership into a limited company, Short Brothers Limited. The yard now employed 1,500 people.

== 20th century ==
In the First World War the yard built 14 barges for the Admiralty, plus merchant ships including four cargo ships to the War Shipping Controller's standard B type design. After the war Short's built its first two turbine steamers; the 7,607 GRT sister ships TS Sandown Castle (1921) and TS Sandgate Castle (1922) for Union-Castle Line.

During the 1920s shipbuilding declined. Short's workforce struck in 1923 and 1926 and the yard closed in June 1930.

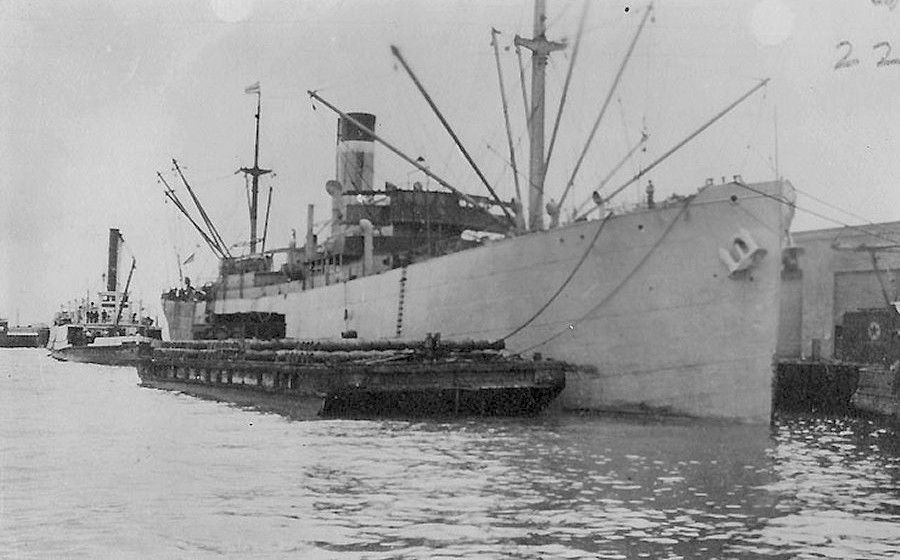
SS Cacique, built by Short Brothers in 1910

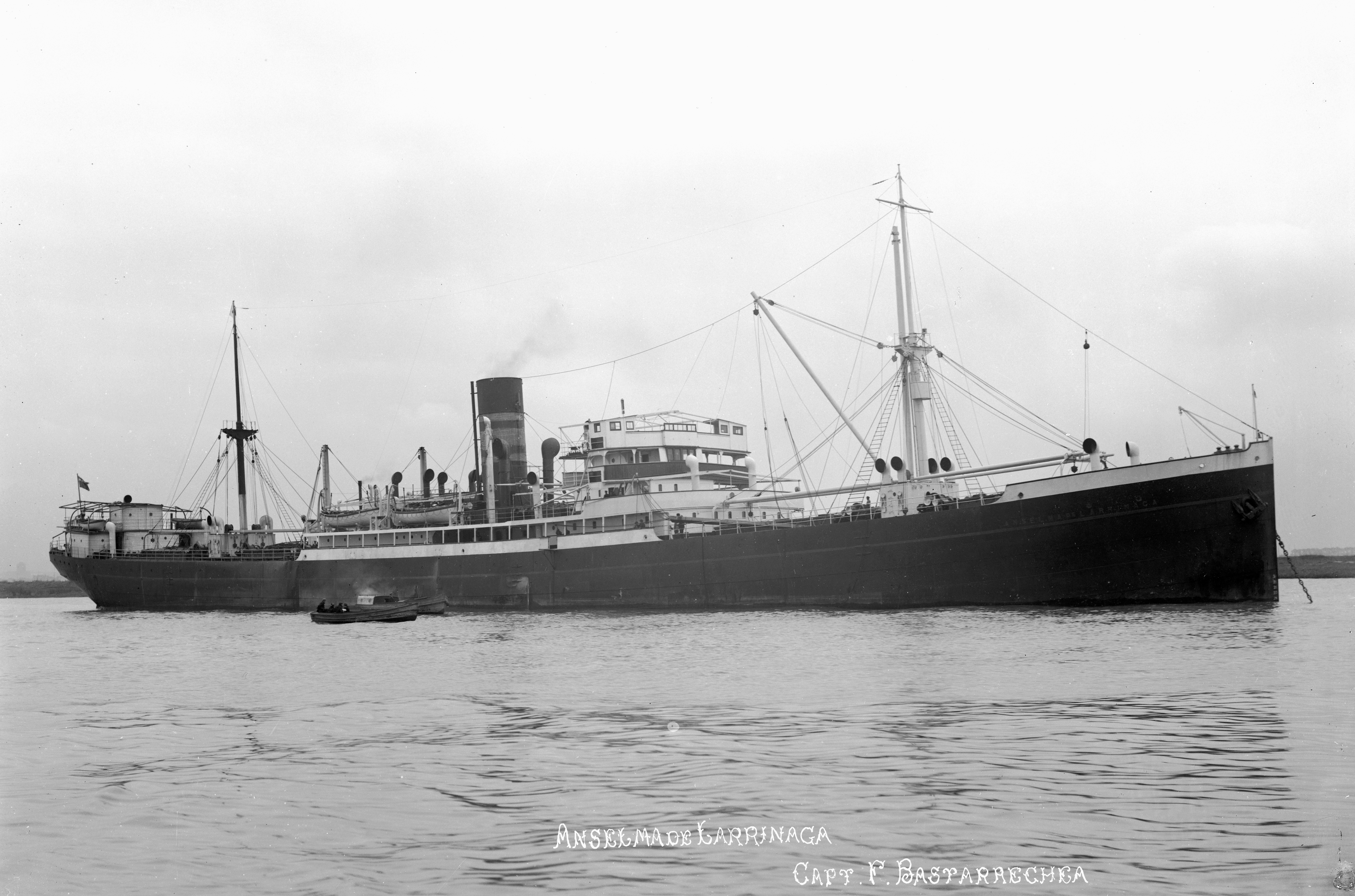
Anselma de Larrinaga built in 1914 as Moorish Prince

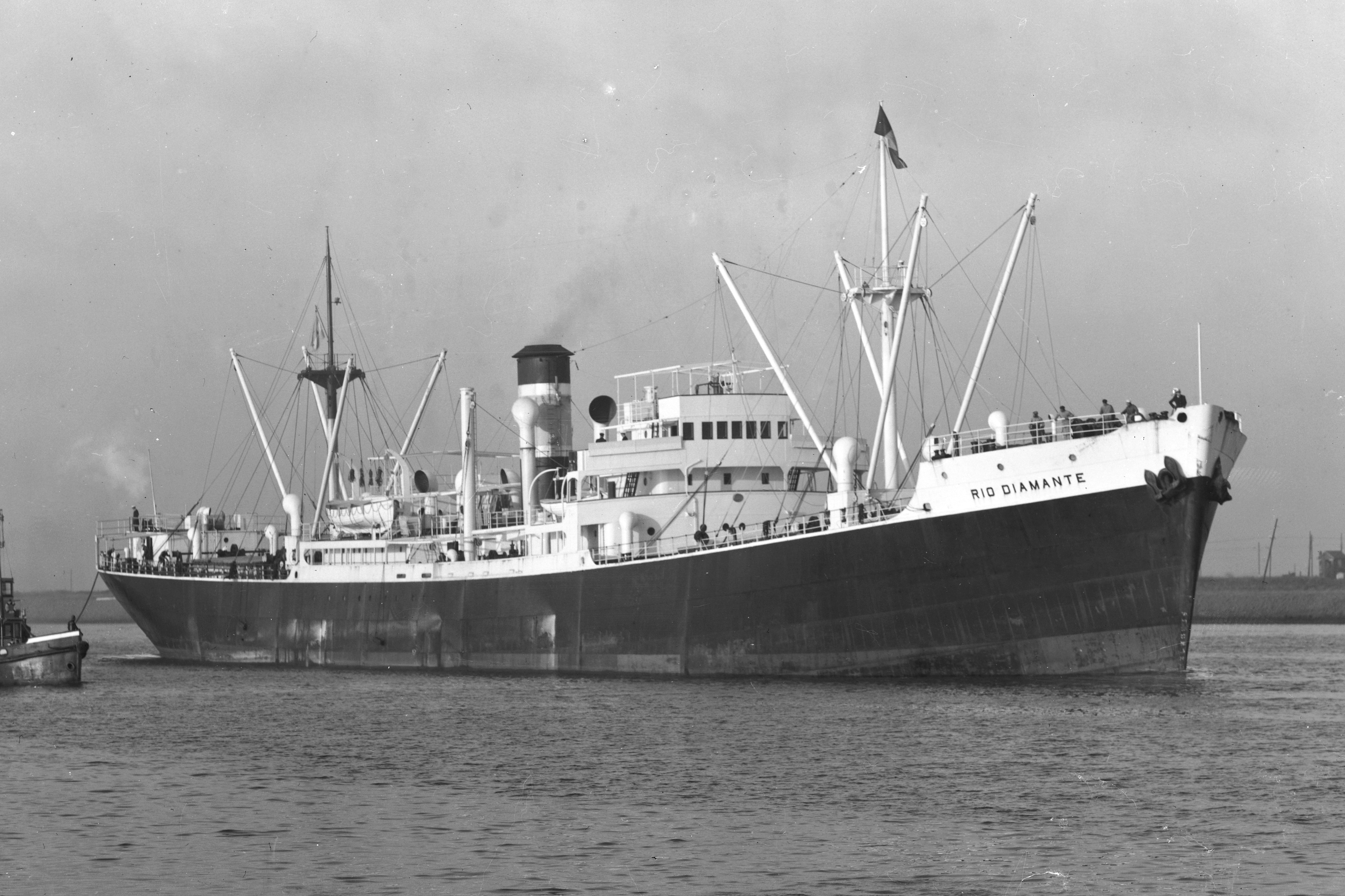
Buenos Aires registered Rio Diamante was built in 1946

In 1933 Short's reopened to build SS Arcwear, a tramp steamer designed by Joseph Isherwood. She was the first of Isherwood's new "arcform" design, which increased cargo capacity by 10% and increased speed, but also reduced fuel consumption. Arcwear was launched in November 1933 and made her maiden voyage in 1934. Her fuel economy and speed exceeded expectations but she rolled badly in heavy weather and did not even move smoothly in calm weather. Only a few further arcform cargo ships and tankers were built. In 1938 Short's closed again, despite having a tramp ship still under construction.

In the summer of 1939 Short's reopened again. During the Second World War it built mostly tramp steamers, plus two tankers and one LCT. Under the direction of the Ministry of War Transport by the end of 1944 Short's switched from building ships to its own design to assembling partly prefabricated government standard C-type cargo ships. By the end of the war Short's was employing about 900 people.

In 1946 John H Short was company chairman and H.S. Short, great-grandson of the founder, joined the board of directors.

In the early 1960s the Short family did not want to invest in lengthening the yard's berths to build bigger ships. Therefore, after Short's launched the universal bulk carrier MV Carlton on 17 October 1963 and completed her in January 1964, they closed the business with the loss of 300 jobs.

- 1889 – SS Magnus Mail – hull 184
- 1892 – SS Hindustan
- 1910 – SS Cacique
- 1918 – SS Clan Macvicar
- 1927 – SS Laristan – hull 425
- 1940 – SS Empire Summer
- 1941 – SS Empire Sun
- 1941 – SS Empire Burton – hull 466
- 1941 – SS Empire Lightning
- 1941 – SS Empire Wycliff
- 1941 – SS Empire Story
- 1942 – SS Empire Bardolph – hull 474
- 1942 – SS Empire Southey
- 1942 – SS Empire Keats
- 1942 – SS Empire Webster
- 1942 – SS Empire Envoy
- 1943 – SS Empire Friendship
- 1943 – SS Empire Camp
- 1943 – SS Empire Stuart
- 1943 – SS Empire Duchess
- 1943 – SS Empire Cromer – hull 480
- 1944 – SS Empire Lagos
- 1945 – SS Empire Nairobi
- 1945 – SS Empire Honduras
- 1945 – SS Empire Dominica
- 1946 – MV Empire Tedburgh
- 1952 – MV Burutu Palm
