= List of Liberty ships (T) =

This is a list of Liberty ships with names beginning with T.

== Description ==
The standard Liberty ship (EC-2-S-C1 type) was a cargo ship 441 feet 6 inches (134.57 m) long overall, with a beam of 56 feet 10 3/4 inches (17.34 m). It had a depth of 37 feet 4 inches (11.38 m) and a draft of 26 feet 10 inches (8.18 m). It was powered by a triple expansion steam engine, which had cylinders of 24 1/2 inches (62 cm), 37 inches (94 cm) and 70 inches (180 cm) diameter by 48 inches (120 cm) stroke. The engine produced 2,500ihp at 76rpm. Driving a four-blade propeller 18 feet 6 inches (5.64 m) in diameter, could propel the ship at 11 knots (20 km/h).

Cargo was carried in five holds, numbered 1–5 from bow to stern. Grain capacity was 84,183 cubic feet (2,383.8 m^{3}), 145,604 cubic feet (4,123.0 m^{3}), 96,429 cubic feet (2,730.6 m^{3}), 93,190 cubic feet (2,639 m^{3}) and 93,190 cubic feet (2,639 m^{3}), with a further 49,086 cubic feet (1,390.0 m^{3}) in the deep tanks. Bale capacity was 75,405 cubic feet (2,135.2 m^{3}), 134,638 cubic feet (3,812.5 m^{3}), 83,697 cubic feet (2,370.0 m^{3}), 82,263 cubic feet (2,329.4 m^{3}) and 82,435 cubic feet (2,334.3 m^{3}), with a further 41,135 cubic feet (1,164.8 m^{3}) in the deep tanks.

It carried a crew of 45, plus 36 United States Navy Armed Guard gunners. Later in the war, this was altered to a crew of 52, plus 29 gunners. Accommodation was in a three deck superstructure placed midships. The galley was equipped with a range, a 25 US gallons (95 L) stock kettle and other appliances. Messrooms were equipped with an electric hot plate and an electric toaster.

== Tabitha Brown ==
Tabitha Brown was built by Oregon Shipbuilding Corporation, Portland, Oregon. Her keel was laid on 15 September 1942. She was launched on 16 October and delivered on 24 October. Laid up in Suisun Bay post-war, she was scrapped at Portland, Oregon in July 1969.

== T. A. Johnston ==
T. A. Johnston was built by J. A. Jones Construction Co., Panama City, Florida. Her keel was laid on 14 November 1944. She was launched on 13 December and delivered on 27 December. She ran aground off Egmont Point, United Kingdom on 10 December 1945. She was refloated on 13 December. Laid up in the Hudson River post-war, she was scrapped at Kearny, New Jersey in December 1970.

== Tarleton Brown ==
Tarleton Brown was built by Delta Shipbuilding Company, New Orleans, Louisiana. Her keel was laid on 3 March 1943. She was launched on 10 April and delivered on 24 April. She was converted to a crane barge at Tacoma, Washington in May 1967.

== Tecumseh ==
Tecumseh was built by Permanente Metals Corporation, Richmond, California. Her keel was laid on 30 April 1943. She was launched on 25 May and delivered on 5 June. Built for the War Shipping Administration (WSA), she was operated under the management of Moore-McCormack Lines. To the French Government in 1946, operated under the management of Compagnie Générale Transatlantique. Renamed Avranches in 1947. Sold in 1966 to Transatlantica de Navigation S.A., Panama and renamed Avranchoise. Operated under the management of Industria Armamento. She was scrapped at Split, Yugoslavia in October 1970.

== Telfair Stockton ==
Telfair Stockton was built by St. Johns River Shipbuilding Company, Jacksonville, Florida. Her keel was laid on 24 October 1944. She was launched on 23 November and delivered on 30 November. Built for the WSA, she was operated under the management of R. A. Nicol & Co. Management transferred to J. H. Winchester & Co. in 1946, then to Union Sulphur Company, New York later that year. Sold to Oro Navigation Co. in 1947. Operated under the management of General Steamship Corp. Renamed Eugenie in 1949. Sold in 1956 to Sea Freighter Corp. and renamed Transporter. Reflagged to Liberia and operated under the management of Polarus Steamship Co. Management transferred to Cargo Ships & Tankers Inc. in 1957. Sold in 1959 to Jackson Steamship Co. Operated under the management of Suwannee Steamship Co. Lengthened at Tokyo, Japan in 1961. Now 511 feet 6 inches (155.91 m) long and 8,636 GRT. Sold in 1967 to Arger Navigation Ltd. and renamed Zaneta II. Operated under the management of Atlantic Shipping Co. Sold in 1968 to Ivory Coast Transport Co. and renamed Sfakia. Operated under the management of Commodity Chartering Corp. She was scrapped at Kaohsiung, Taiwan in May 1973.

== T. E. Mitchell ==
T. E. Mitchell was built by Todd Houston Shipbuilding Corporation, Houston, Texas. Her keel was laid on 13 June 1944. She was launched on 21 July and delivered on 31 July. She was scrapped at Portland, Oregon in January 1970.

== Tench Tilghman ==
Tench Tilghman was built by Bethlehem Fairfield Shipyard, Baltimore, Maryland. Her keel was laid on 25 July 1943. She was launched as Tench Tilghman on 21 August and delivered as Samos on 30 August. To the Ministry of War Transport (MoWT) under Lend-Lease. Operated under the management of Elder Dempster Lines. Sold to her managers in 1947 and renamed Zini. Sold in 1959 to Dorset Shipping Co. and renamed San Salvador. Reflagged to Liberia and operated under the management of Purvis Shipping Co. She was scrapped at La Spezia, Italy in December 1968.

== Terry E. Stephenson ==
Terry E. Stephenson was built by Permanente Metals Corporation. Her keel was laid on 23 May 1944. She was launched on 13 June and delivered on 21 June. Laid up in the Hudson River post-war, she was scrapped at Alicante, Spain in March 1971.

== Thaddeus Kosciuszko ==
Thaddeus Kosciuszko a limited troop carrier was built by Bethlehem Fairfield Shipyard. Her keel was laid on 2 November 1942. She was launched on 28 November and delivered on 15 December. Built for the WSA, she was operated under the management of Grace Line Inc. Sold in 1947 to Baltimore Insular Line and renamed Marina. Sold in 1954 to Isla Colon Compania Navigation, Panama and renamed Acritas. Reflagged to Liberia and operated under the management of Orion Shipping & Trading Co. She ran aground south of Maio Island, Cape Verde Islands on 10 May 1956 whilst on a voyage from Kassa Island, Guinea to Port Alfred, Union of South Africa. She was refloated on 26 June. Although declared a constructive total loss, she was repaired at Lübeck, West Germany. Sold later that year to Elias Compania Maritime, Panama and renamed Elias. Remaining under the Liberian flag and operated under the management of Lemos Bros. Renamed Georges in 1961. She ran aground in the Kara Sea (69°52′N 61°10′E on 20 September 1962 whilst on a voyage from Igarka, Soviet Union to London, United Kingdom.

== Thaddeus S. C. Lowe ==
Thaddeus S. C. Lowe was built by California Shipbuilding Corporation, Terminal Island, Los Angeles, California. Her keel was laid on 17 March 1943. She was launched on 13 April and delivered on 26 April. She was damaged in the Pacific Ocean in 1943 whilst discharging cargo into Landing Craft. Declared a constructive total loss, she was towed to the United States and laid up in Suisun Bay. She was scrapped at Oakland, California in June 1959.

== Theodore Dwight Weld ==
Theodore Dwight Weld was built by California Shipbuilding Corporation. Her keel was laid on 26 January 1943. She was launched on 23 February and delivered on 11 March. Built for the WSA, she was operated under the management of Seas Shipping Co. She was torpedoed and damaged in the Atlantic Ocean 500 nautical miles (930 km) south west of Ireland (57°03′N 28°08′W) by U-238 on 20 September 1943 whilst on a voyage from Manchester, United Kingdom to New York. She consequently broke in two and sank.

== Theodore Foster ==
Theodore Foster was built by Bethlehem Fairfield Shipyard. Her keel was laid on 31 March 1942. She was launched on 14 June and delivered on 29 June. She was scrapped at Gandia, Spain in July 1970.

== Theodore Parker ==
Theodore Parker was built by California Shipbuilding Corporation. Her keel was laid on 28 January 1943. She was launched on 24 February and delivered on 13 March. Built for the WSA, she was operated under the management of Agwilines Inc. Laid up in the James River post-war, she was scuttled 3 nautical miles (5.6 km) off Atlantic Beach, North Carolina on 4 June 1974.

== Theodore Roosevelt ==
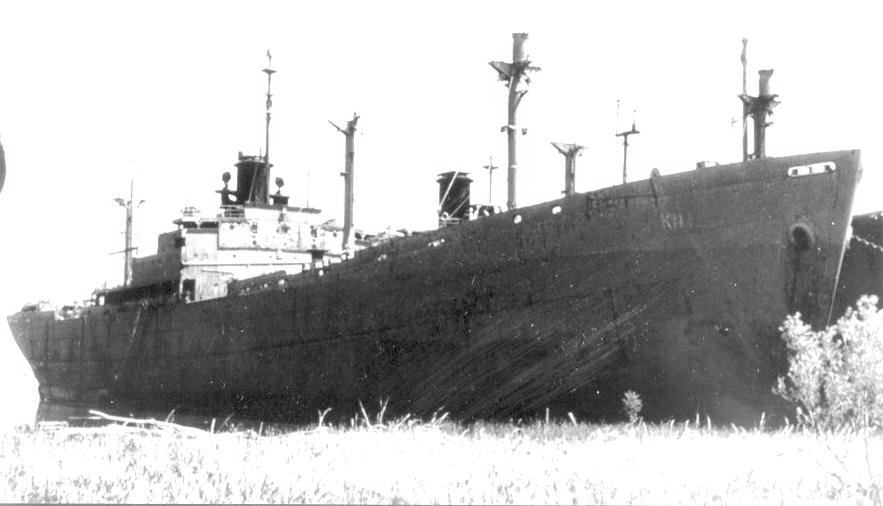
USS Indus

Theodore Roosevelt was built by Bethlehem Fairfield Shipyard. Her keel was laid on 4 October 1943. She was launched on 29 October and delivered on 5 November. To the United States Navy and renamed Indus. Converted for naval use by Maryland Drydock Company, Baltimore. Returned to the WSA in May 1946 and renamed Theodore Roosevelt. Laid up at Wilmington, North Carolina. She was scrapped there in May 1967.

== Theodore Sedgwick ==
Theodore Sedgwick was built by Todd Houston Shipbuilding. Her keel was laid on 2 June 1942. She was launched on 19 August and delivered on 9 September. She was scrapped at Hirao, Japan in March 1961.

== Theodoric Bland ==
Theodoric Bland was built by Delta Shipbuilding Company. Her keel was laid on 19 January 1942. She was launched on 30 May and delivered on 29 July. She was scrapped at New Orleans in June 1963.

== Thomas A. Edison ==
Thomas A. Edison was built by Oregon Shipbuilding Corporation. Her keel was laid on 20 September 1942. She was launched on 20 October and delivered on 29 October. Built for the WSA, she was operated under the management of Grace Line Inc. She was wrecked on Vauta Vatoe, Fiji Islands (19°55′S 178°16′E) on 4 December 1942 whilst on a voyage from San Francisco, California to Suva, Fiji.

== Thomas A. Hendricks ==
Thomas A. Hendricks was built by Oregon Shipbuilding Corporation. Her keel was laid on 22 April 1943. She was launched on 10 May and delivered on 18 May. Built for the WSA, she was operated under the management of American Mail Line. To the Dutch Government in 1947 and renamed Robert Fruin. Renamed Amsteldiep later that year and placed under the management of Amsterdam N.V. Reederij, Amsterdam. Sold to her managers in 1950. Sold in 1961 to Demetrios P. Margaronis & Sons, Piraeus, Greece and renamed Efdemon. Operated under the management of Angelos Ltd. Management transferred to Victoria Steamship Co. in 1965. She was scrapped at Kaohsiung in September 1968.

== Thomas A. McGinley ==
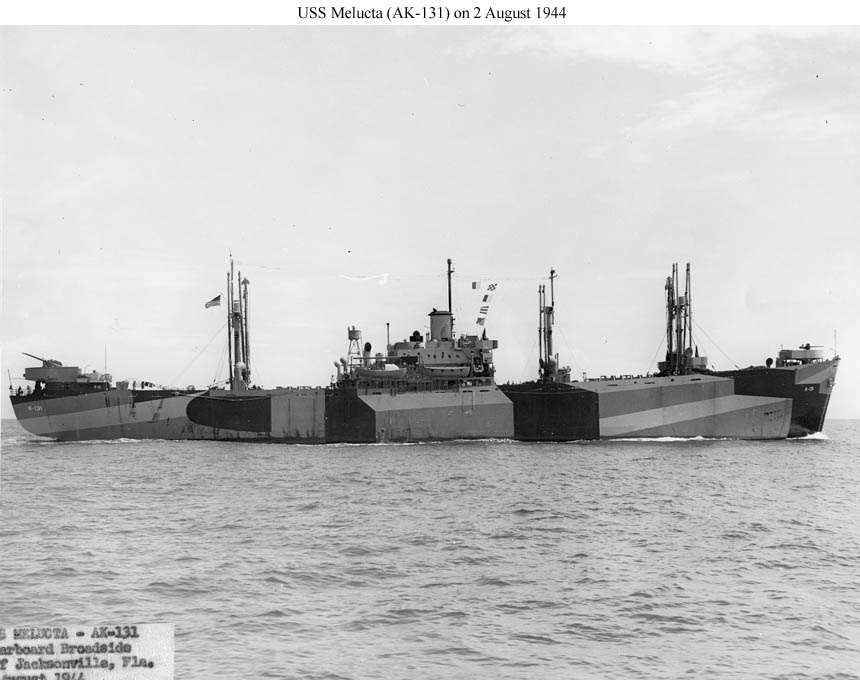
USS Melucta

Thomas A. McGinley was built by St. Johns River Shipbuilding Company, Jacksonville, Florida. Her keel was laid on 21 January 1944. She was launched as Thomas A. McGinley on 20 March and delivered to the United States Navy as Melucta on 31 March. Converted for naval use by Gibbs Engine Co., Jacksonville. Returned to WSA in December 1945 and renamed Thomas A. McGinley. Laid up in the James River post-war, she was scrapped at Bilbao in August 1970.

== Thomas Bailey Aldrich ==
Thomas Bailey Aldrich was built by Oregon Shipbuilding Corporation. Her keel was laid on 16 April 1942. She was launched on 22 May and delivered on 1 June. Laid up at Mobile, Alabama post-war, she was scrapped at Panama City, Florida in October 1968.

== Thomas B. King ==
Thomas B. King was built by J. A. Jones Construction Co., Brunswick, Georgia. Her keel was laid on 23 June 1944. She was launched on 7 August and delivered on 19 August. Built for the WSA, she was operated under the management of Wessel Duval Co. Laid up in the Hudson River post-war, she was scrapped at Panama City, Florida in September 1970.

== Thomas B. Reed ==
Thomas B. Reed was built by New England Shipbuilding Corporation, South Portland, Maine. Her keel was laid on 19 April 1943. She was launched on 9 June and delivered on 19 June. She was scrapped at Kearny in 1966.

== Thomas B. Robertson ==
Thomas B. Robertson was built by Delta Shipbuilding Company. Her keel was laid on 6 November 1941. She was launched on 9 May 1942 and delivered on 7 July. She was scrapped in New Orleans in June 1963.

== Thomas Bradlee ==
Thomas Bradlee was built by New England Shipbuilding Corporation. Her keel was laid on 26 June 1944. She was launched on 16 August and delivered on 25 August. She was scrapped at New Orleans in 1965.

== Thomas Bulfinch ==
Thomas Bulfinch was built by Todd Houston Shipbuilding. Her keel was laid on 8 July 1944. She was launched on 16 August and delivered on 26 August. Laid up in Puget Sound post-war, she was converted to a non-seagoing fish processing plant in 1971 for use at Dutch Harbor, Alaska.

== Thomas Clyde ==
Thomas Clyde was built by New England Shipbuilding Corporation. Her keel was laid on 16 August 1943. She was launched on 5 October and delivered on 15 October. Built for the War Shipping Administration, she was operated under the management of Moore-McCormack Lines. To the French Government in 1947 and renamed Gien. Operated under the management of Compagnie Marseille de Navigation Coloniale. Management transferred to Louis Dreyfus et Compagnie later that year. Sold in 1960 to Compania San Giovanni S.A., Panama and renamed Marnipo. Reflagged to Lebanonand operated under the management of Wigham, Richardson & Co. She ran aground in the Dardanelles on 12 January 1963 whilst on a voyage from Constanța, Romania to Alexandria, Egypt. She broke in two and was a total loss.

== Thomas Condon ==
Thomas Condon was built by Oregon Shipbuilding Corporation. Her keel was laid on 28 May 1943. She was launched on 17 June and delivered on 25 June. Built for the WSA, she was operated under the management of Norton Lilly Management Co. Sold in 1947 to Theodoros L. Teryazos, Piraeus and renamed Leontios. Placed under the management of Wigham, Richardson & Co. in 1963. She was scrapped at Hirao in October 1967.

== Thomas Corwin ==
Thomas Corwin was built by Permanente Metals Corporation. Her keel was laid on 19 February 1943. She was launched on 21 March and delivered on 5 April. She was scrapped at Portland, Oregon in November 1964.

== Thomas C. Power ==
Thomas C. Power was built by Permanente Metals Corporation. Her keel was laid on 10 Julu 1043. She was launched on 31 July and delivered on 11 August. She was scrapped at Wilmington, North Carolina in December 1965.

== Thomas Crawford ==
Thomas Crawford was built by Oregon Shipbuilding Corporation. Her keel was laid on 23 October 1943. She was launched on 12 November and delivered on 22 November. She was scrapped at Seattle, Washington in September 1959.

== Thomas Cresap ==
Thomas Cresap was a limited troop carrier built by Bethlehem Fairfield Shipyard. Her keel was laid on 17 January 1943. She was launched on 1 March and delivered on 16 March. Built for the WSA, she was operated under the management of Isthmian Steamship Company. Sold in 1951 to Key Steamship Corp. and renamed Sunion. Operated under the management of Adamanthos Ship Operating Co. Sold in 1957 to Kifissia Shipping Corp. Reflagged to Liberia, remaining under the same management. Lengthened at Tokyo in 1959. Now 511 feet 6 inches (155.91 m) long and 8,578 GRT. Renamed Zermatt in 1960. Sold in 1962 to Auroraship Co. Ltd and renamed Epiros. Reflagged to Greece and operated under the management of Auror Shipping Agency. Sold in 1966 to Tassia Compania Navigation, Panama and renamed Tassia J. Reflagged to Liberia and operated under the management of P. Johnson Shipping Ltd. Sold in 1967 to Pacific Coast Shipping Co. and renamed Pactrader. Operated under the management of Lasco Shipping Co. She was scrapped at Sakaide, Japan in December 1968.

== Thomas Donaldson ==
Thomas Donaldson was built by Bethlehem Fairfield Shipyard. Her keel was laid on 17 January 1944. She was launched on 11 February and delivered on 22 February. Built for the WSA, she was operated under the management of American Export Lines. She was torpedoed and damaged by U-968 20 nautical miles (37 km) off the Kola Inlet (69°26′N 33°44′E) on 20 March 1945 whilst on a voyage from New York to Murmansk, Soviet Union. She was taken in tow, but consequently sank.

== Thomas Eakins ==
Thomas Eakins was built by Todd Houston Shipbuilding. Her keel was laid on 22 July 1944. She was launched on 29 August and delivered on 9 September. She was scrapped at Baltimore in August 1960.

== Thomas Ewing ==
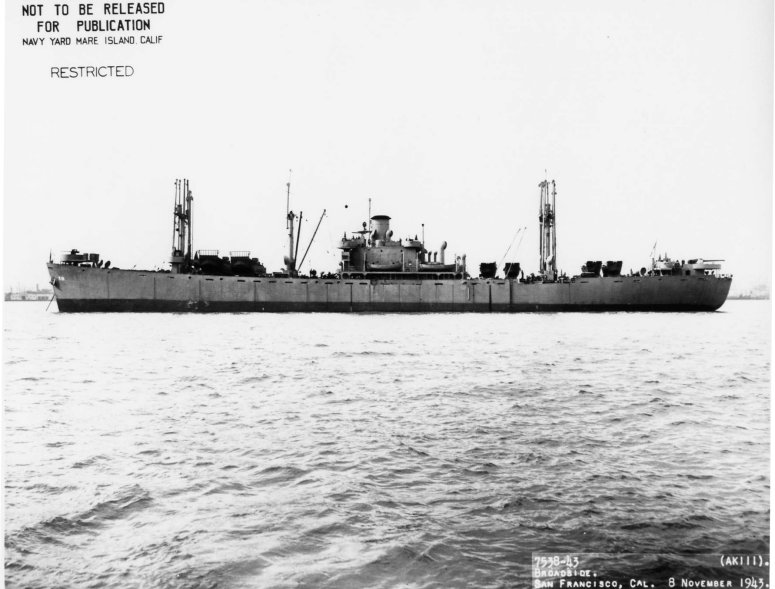
USS Giansar

Thomas Ewing was built by Oregon Shipbuilding Corporation. Her keel was laid on 27 December 1942. She was launched on 19 January 1943 and delivered on 31 January. To the United States Navy in October 1943, renamed Giansar. Returned to WSA in November 1945 and renamed Thomas Ewing. Laid up in the James River. She was scrapped at Baltimore in April 1963.

== Thomas F. Bayard ==
Edvard Grieg

Thomas F. Bayard was built by Bethlehem Fairfield Shipyard. Her keel was laid on 24 April 1943. She was launched as Thomas F. Bayard on 24 May and delivered as Edvard Grieg on 31 May. To the Norwegian Government under charter, she was operated under the management of Andreas Stray, Farsund. Sold in July 1946 to Ing. Bjørneboe, Kristiansand. Sold in December 1946 to Andreas Stray. Sold in 1949 to A/S Sobral, Oslo. Operated under the management of Oivind Lorentzen. Sold in 1951 to Socony Vacuum Oil Co. Also stated as sold to Brillian Transport Co., Panama that year. Sold to L.P.G. Carriers Inc., New York in 1952. Converted at Kiel, West Germany to a Liquified Natural Gas tanker. Now 441 feet 6 inches (134.57 m) long and assessed at 7,468 GRT. Renamed Ultragas Sao Paulo. Sold in 1961 to A/S Gasskib, Oslo and renamed Mundogas Sao Paulo. Re-registered to Norway and operated under the management of Oivind Lorentzen. Converted to a floating store in February 1969. Subsequently grounded at Santos, Brazil as a storage tank. Transferred to Mundogas Inc., Monrovia, Liberia in November 1969.

== Thomas F. Cunningham ==
Thomas F. Cunningham was a tanker built by Delta Shipbuilding Co. Her keel was laid on 2 September 1943. She was launched on 15 October and delivered on 22 November. Built for the WSA, she was operated under the management of Spencer Kellogg & Sons. Management transferred to Keystone Shipping Co. in 1946. Sold in 1948 to Amtron Tanker Co. and renamed Paul Revere. Operated under the management of American Trans-Ocean Navigation Corp. She was convertedto a cargo ship at Hoboken, New Jersey in 1949. Sold in 1954 to Trans-World Steamship Co. and renamed Chris. Reflagged to Liberia and operated under the management of Grauds Shipping Co. She was scrapped at Hirao in November 1965.

== Thomas F. Flaherty ==
Thomas F. Flaherty was built by Permanente Metals Corporation. Her keel was laid on 22 March 1944. She was launched as Thomas F. Flaherty on 11 April and delivered as Stalingrad on 18 April. To the Soviet Union under Lend-Lease. Renamed Volgograd in 1962. To Far East Shipping Co. in 1978 and converted to non-seagoing use at Vostochny. Deleted from shipping registers in 1982.

== Thomas F. Hunt ==
Thomas F. Hunt was built by Permanente Metals Corporation. Her keel was laid on 25 May 1944. She was launched on 16 June and delivered on 28 June. She was converted to a barge at Portland, Oregon in May 1964 and renamed Zidell's Delight 2.

== Thomas F. Meagher ==
Thomas F. Meagher was built by New England Shipbuilding Corporation. Her keel was laid on 18 October 1944. She was launched on 3 December and delivered on 11 December. She was sold to shipbreakers in Philadelphia in August 1969.

== Thomas Fitzsimons ==
Thomas Fitzsimons was built by Delta Shipbuilding Co. Her keel was laid on 26 February 1943. She was launched on 6 April and delivered on 24 April. She was scrapped at Portland, Oregon in August 1964.

== Thomas G. Masaryk ==
Thomas G. Masaryk was built by California Shipbuilding Corporation. Her keel was laid on 19 July 1943. She was launched on 12 August and delivered on 26 August. Built for the WSA, she was operated under the management of Seas Shipping Co. She was torpedoed by aircraft off the coast of Libya (32°51′N 23°00′E) on 14 April 1944 and set afire whilst on a voyage from New York to Abadan, Iran. She was scuttled in shallow water. Her cargo was discharged into the Liberty ship William M. Meredith. She was later refloated and towed to Alexandria, Egypt, where she was declared a constructive total loss. Sold for scrapping in February 1948. She was towed to Málaga, Spain on 18 August 1951 and was scrapped there in September.

== Thomas Hart Benton ==
Thomas Hart Benton was built by Marinship Corporation, Sausalito, California. Her keel was laid on 11 September 1942. She was launched on 20 December and delivered on 2 February 1943. She was scrapped at Kearny in June 1969.

== Thomas Hartley ==
Thomas Hartley was built by Todd Houston Shipbuilding. Her keel was laid on 26 May 1942. She was launched on 12 August and delivered on 31 August. She was converted to a crane barge at Seattle in 1966.

== Thomas Heyward ==
Thomas Heyward was built by Alabama Drydock and Shipbuilding Company, Mobile. She was delivered on 31 July 1942. Laid up in the James River post-war, she was scuttled off Destin, Florida on 14 April 1977.

== Thomas H. Gallaudet ==
Thomas H. Gallaudet was a tanker built by California Shipbuilding Corporation. She was completed in November 1943. Built for the WSA, she was operated under the management of Boland & Cornelius. To the Soviet Union in 1944 under Lend-Lease and renamed Maikop. Returned to United States Maritime Commission (USMC) in 1948 and laid up in the Hudson River. Sold in 1951 to Traders Steamship Corp and renamed Amberstar. Sold in 1954 to Morelos Compania Navigation, Panama and renamed Elmira. Reflagged to Liberia and operated under the management of Triton Shipping Inc. She was converted to a cargo ship at Greenock, United Kingdom in 1955. Now 7,199 GRT. Renamed Pontos in 1960 and reflagged to Greece. Sold in 1965 to South Pacific Coast Shipping Co. and renamed Samuel S. Reflagged to Liberia and operated under the management of Lasco Shipping Co. She ran aground on Kuchinoerabu-jima, Japan (30°25′N 130°14′E) on 25 March 1969 whilst on a voyage from Guam, Marshall Islands to Pusan, South Korea. She subsequently broke in two and sank.

== Thomas Hill ==
Thomas Hill was built by California Shipbuilding Corporation. Her keel was laid on 5 April 1943. She was launched on 27 April and delivered on 10 May. Built for the WSA, she was operated under the management of Agwilines Inc. to the French Government in 1947 and renamed L'Orient. Operatefd under the management of Compagnie Nantaise des Chargeurs de l'Ouest. Management transferred to Société Navigation Caennaise Anet. G. Lamy in 1953. Sold in 1961 to A. Halcoussis, Piraeus and renamed Yanix. She sprang a leak and sank 50 nautical miles (93 km) north of Luzon, Philippines (19°00′N 120°00′E) on 5 February 1962 whilst on a voyage from Madras, India to Kobe, Japan.

== Thomas Hooker ==
Thomas Hooker was built by New England Shipbuilding Corporation. Her keel was laid on 14 October 1941. She was launched on 13 July 1942 and delivered on 11 August. Built for the WSA, she was operated under the management of American West African Line. She broke in two and sank in the Atlantic Ocean (55°20′N 47°00′W) on 5 March 1943 whilst on a voyage from Bône, Algeria to New York.

== Thomas Howell ==
Thomas Howell was built by Oregon Shipbuilding Corporation. Her keel was laid on 8 September 1943. She was launched on 22 September and delivered on 29 September. She was scrapped at Oakland in May 1964.

== Thomas H. Sumner ==
Thomas H. Sumner was built by New England Shipbuilding Corporation. Her keel was laid on 8 May 1944. She was launched on 24 June and delivered on 30 June. Built for the WSA, she was operated under the management of A. J. Burbank & Co. Management transferred to States Marine Corp. in 1946. Sold in February 1947 to Global Transport Co., Panama and renamed Global Merchant, remaining under the same management. Sold on 4 July 1947 to Skips A/S, Akershus, Norway and renamed Sjoa Operated under the management of Gørrisen & Co., A/S. Sold in 1949 to Gørrisen & Klaveness A/S, Oslo. Operated under the management of Skips A/S Akersviken and Gørrisen & Klaveness A/S. Sold in September 1950 to Navigator Steamship Co. S.A., Panama and renamed Astrid Naess. Reflagged to Liberia. Renamed Flisvos II in 1953. Sold in 1954 to Seacrest Shipping Co., New York. Sold in 1963 to Feliz Compania Navigation S.A., Panama and renamed Mariely. Reflagged to Liberia and operated under the management of Dynamic Shipping Inc. Sold in 1965 to Conquista Navegacion S.A., Panama and renamed Omega. Remaining under the Liberian flag and operated under the management of Gotham Steamship Agency. She sprang a leak in the Pacific Ocean 2,000 nautical miles (3,700 km) south east of Honolulu, Hawaii (6°57′N 125°53′E) on 13 November 1966 whilst on a voyage from a port in Venezuela to a port in the Philippines. She was abandoed and was presumed to have foundered.

== Thomas Jefferson ==
Thomas Jefferson was built by Oregon Shipbuilding Corporation. Her keel was laid on 18 July 1941. She was launched on 7 December and delivered on 24 February 1942. She was scrapped at Terminal Island in April 1961.

== Thomas J. Jarvis ==
Thomas J. Jarvis was built by North Carolina Shipbuilding Company, Wilmington, North Carolina. Her keel was laid on 19 May 1943. She was launched on 14 June and delivered on 20 June. She was scrapped at Wilmington, North Carolina in August 1961.

== Thomas J. Lyons ==
Thomas J. Lyons was built by St. Johns River Shipbuilding Company. Her keel was laid on 7 April 1944. She was launched on 18 May and delivered on 2 June. She was scrapped at Portland, Oregon in November 1963.

== Thomas Johnson ==
Thomas Johnson was a limited troop carrier built by California Shipbuilding Corporation. Her keel was laid on 21 September 1942. She was launched on 24 October and delivered on 10 November. Built for the WSA, she was operated under the management of Union Sulphur Company. Sold to her managers in 1947 and renamed Union Sulphur. Sold in 1955 to Terminal Steamship Co. and renamed Cilco Logger. Operated under the management of A. L. Burbank & Co. Sold in 1961 to Speed Steamship Co., New York and renamed Speed. Sold later that year to Vetmar Compania de Vapores, Panama and renamed Alfa. Reflagged to Greece and operated under the management of Transocean Steamship Agency. Management transferred to Gotham Steamship Agency in 1964. She was scrapped at Kaohsiung in 1968.

== Thomas J. Rusk ==
Thomas J. Rusk was built by Todd Houston Shipbuilding. Her keel was laid on 3 September 1942. She was launched on 11 November and delivered on 26 November. Laid up at Mobile post-war, she was scrapped at Panama City, Florida in October 1972.

== Thomas J. Walsh ==
Thomas J. Walsh was built by Oregon Shipbuilding Corporation. Her keel was laid on 3 August 1943. She was launched on 22 August and delivered on 30 August. Built for the WSA, she was operated under the management of United States Lines. Sold in 1947 to Michael G. Livanos, Athens and renamed Atalanti. Sold in 1958 to Atalanti M. Livanos. Operated under the management of Ocean Shipbrokerage Co. Sold in 1962 to Tramp Tankers Corp. and renamed Tramprover. Reflagged to Liberia, remaining under the same management. Sold in 1966 to Quinto Navigation Corp. and renamed Boreal. Operated under the management of Scio Shipping Inc. She was scrapped at Kaohsiung in April 1969.

== Thomas Kearns ==
Thomas Kearns was built by Permanente Metals Corporation. Her keel was laid on 11 January 1943. She was launched on 12 February and delivered on 23 February. She was scrapped at jacksonville in December 1961.

== Thomas L. Clingman ==
Thomas L. Clingman was built by North Carolina Shipbuilding Company. Her keel was laid on 18 March 1943. She was launched on 17 April and delivered on 24 April. She was scrapped at Baltimore in June 1960.

== Thomas Le Valley ==
Thomas Le Valley was built by J. A. Jones Construction Co., Panama City. Her keel was laid on 11 February 1944. She was launched on 28 March and delivered on 29 April. To the United States Army in 1944 and renamed General Walter R. Weaver. Used as an aircraft repair ship. Returned to the WSA in 1946 and renamed Thomas Le Valley. She was scrapped at La Spezia in October 1970.

== Thomas L. Haley ==
Thomas L. Haley was built by St. Johns River Shipbuilding Company. Her keel was laid on 8 January 1945. She was launched as Thomas L. Haley on 12 February and delivered as Spetsae on 25 February. To the Greek Government under Lend-Lease. Sold in 1947 to Stavros S. Niarchos, Piraeus and renamed Captain K. Papazoglou. Sold later that year to N. Coumantaros, Athens. Placed under the management of Union Maritime & Shipping Co. in 1948. Sold in 1949 to Stavros S. Niarchos and placed under the management of Simpson, Spence & Co. Management transferred to North American Shipping & Trading Co. in 1952. Sold in 1954 to Efploia Shipping Corp. and renamed Pantanassa. Operated under the management of G. Lemos Bros. Sold in 1961 to Eftychia Compania Navigation, Panama and renamed Giorgios Tsakiroglou. Reflagged to Lebanon and operated under the management of Franco Shipping Co. Sold in 1964 to Efthia Compania Navigation. Operated under the management of Carapanayoti & Co. Management transferred to Shipping & Trading Co. in 1968. She was scrapped at Whampoa in May 1969.

== Thomas Lynch ==
Thomas Lynch was built by Alabama Drydock and Shipbuilding Company. She was delivered on 31 August 1942. She was scrapped at Portland, Oregon in October 1965.

== Thomas MacDonough ==
Thomas MacDonough was built by Oregon Shipbuilding Corporation. Her keel was laid on 21 October 1941. She was launched on 28 January 1942 and delivered on 24 March. She was scrapped at New Orleans in April 1967.

== Thomas McKean ==
Thomas McKean was built by Bethlehem Fairfield Shipyard. Her keel was laid on 5 November 1941. She was launched on 30 April 1942 and delivered on 29 May. Built for the WSA, she was operated under the management of Calmar Steamship Company. She was torpedoed, shelled and set afire in the Caribbean Sea 350 nautical miles (650 km) north east of Puerto Rico (22°00′N 60°00′W) whilst on a voyage from New York to Bandur Shapur, Iran. She consequently sank.

== Thomas M. Cooley ==
Thomas M. Cooley was built by Permanente Metals Corporation. Her keel was laid on 26 June 1943. She was launched on 17 July and delivered on 29 July. Built for the WSA, she was operated under the management of Olympic Steamship Company. Sold in 1951 to State Cargo Carriers Corp., New York and renamed Sealegend. Sold later that year to Insular Steamship Corp. Operated under the management of Orion Shipping & Trading Co. Sold in 1953 to Ocean Transportation Co. and renamed Ocean Betty. Operated under the management of Maritime Overseas Corp. Renamed Ocean Rose in 1955. Sold to Ocean Tramping Corp. in 1956 and reflagged to Liberia. Sold in 1959 to Sea Liberties Inc. and renamed Pacific Ranger. Reflagged to the United States and operated under the management of Maritime Overseas Corp. Sold in 1960 to José Poblete Videl, Callao, Peru and renamed Dominga. Sold in 1961 to Compania Maritime Santa Maria, Panama and renamed Santa Maria I. Operated under the management of Ferraro Hermanos. Sold in 1965 to Crest Steamship Corp. and renamed Ionic Crest. Operated under the management of Ionic Shipping Agency. She suffered a hull fracture on 4 February 1967 whilst on a voyage from Mormugao, India to a Japanese port. She arrived at Nagoya, Japan for scrapping on 28 February 1967. Resold and renamed Julie II, she was scrapped at Hirao in December 1967.

== Thomas Nast ==
Thomas Nast was built by California Shipbuilding Corporation. Her keel was laid on 27 December 1942. She was launched on 21 January and delivered on 7 February. To the Soviet Union in 1943 and renamed Jean Jaures. Reported scrapped in 1974.

== Thomas Nelson ==
Thomas Nelson was built by Bethlehem Fairfield Shipyard. Her keel was laid on 10 December 1941. she was launched on 4 April 1942 and delivered on 12 May. Built for the WSA, she was operated under the management of Grace Line Inc. She was severely damaged in a Japanese kamikaze attack at Leyte, Philippines on 12 November 1944. She was repaired at San Francisco. Lengthened by 25 feet (7.6 m) and fitted with two diesel engines at Baltimore in 1955, giving her a speed of 15 knots (28 km/h). Operated under the management of United States Lines. Laid up in the James River in 1960. Converted to a dredger and pipelaying ship in 1972 and renamed Beverley M. Laid up at Hoboken in 1976. Moved to Kearny in 1980. Scrapping commenced on 13 August 1981.

== Thomas Nelson Page ==
Thomas Nelson Page was a limited troop carrier built by Bethlehem Fairfield Shipyard. Her keel was laid on 5 May 1943. She was launched on 1 June and delivered on 12 June. Built for the WSA, she was operated under the management of Grace Line Inc. Sold in 1946 to N. Konialidis, Buenos Aires, Argentina and renamed Aristogition. Reflagged to Honduras. Sold in 1947 to Society Armamente Aristomenis, Panama, remaining under the Honduran flag. Sold in 1951 to Compagnie Maritime Belge, Antwerp, Belgium and renamed Capitaine Potie. Sold in 1970 to Sovtorgflot, Odessa, Soviet Union and renamed Sikhote Alin. She was scrapped at Split in August 1970.

== Thomas Nuttall ==
Thomas Nuttall was built by Oregon Shipbuilding Corporation. Her keel was laid on 18 May 1943. She was launched on 7 June and delivered on 15 June. Laid up in the James River post-war, she was scrapped at Kearny in August 1972.

== Thomas Oliver Larkin ==
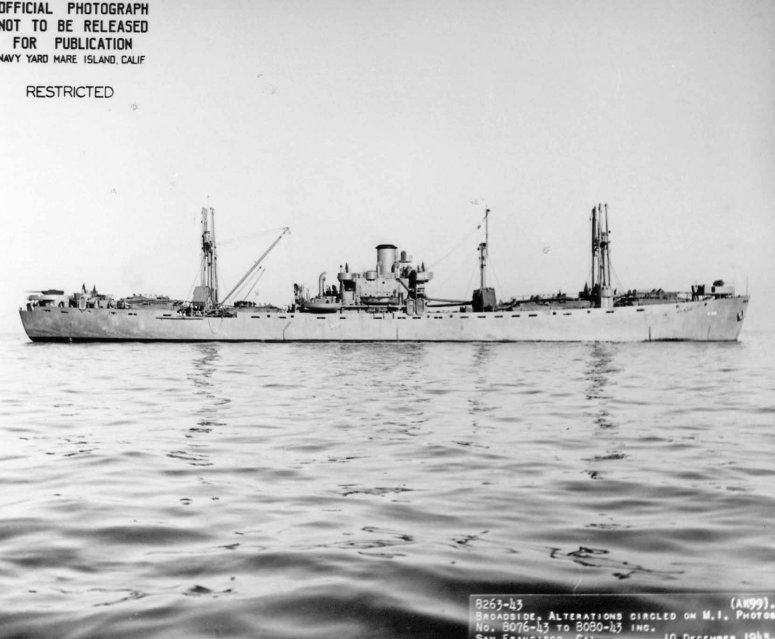
USS Bootes

Thomas Oliver Larkin was built by California Shipbuilding Corporation. Her keel was laid on 24 April 1943. She was launched on 16 May and delivered on 29 May. To the United States Navy and renamed Bootes. Returned to USMC in 1947 and laid up. She was sold for scrapping at Kaohsiung in March 1973.

== Thomas Paine ==
Thomas Paine was built by California Shipbuilding Corporation. Her keel was laid on 24 May 1941. She was launched on 26 October and delivered on 7 March 1942. She was scrapped at Baltimore in March 1960.

== Thomas Pinckney ==
Thomas Pinckney was built by North Carolina Shipbuilding Company. Her keel was laid on 22 June 1942. She was launched on 23 August and delivered on 7 September. She was scrapped at Baltimore in June 1960.

== Thomas P. Leathers ==
Thomas P. Leathers was built by Delta Shipbuilding Co. Her keel was laid on 4 August 1944. She was launched on 13 September and delivered on 19 October. She was scrapped at Kearny in October 1968.

== Thomas Pollock ==
Thomas Pollock was built by North Carolina Shipbuilding Company. Her keel was laid on 22 July 1943. She was launched on 18 August and delivered on 26 August. Built for the WSA, she was operated under the management of Grace Line Inc. Sold in March 1947 to D/S af 1912, Copenhagen, Denmark and renamed Else Mærsk. Operated under the management of A. P. Møller. Sold on 29 January 1949 to Skibs A/S Geirulv and renamed Geirulv. Operated under the management of Gjeruldsen & Tambs. Sold in 1954 to Skibs A/S Olymp, Oslo and renamed Sunlong. Operated under the management of Einar Lange. She was abandoned in a sinking condition in the North Sea (57°55′N 4°40′E on 26 December 1956 whilst on a voyage from Narvik to Rotterdam, Netherlands and was presumed to have sunk.

== Thomas R. Marshall ==
Thomas R. Marshall was built by Bethlehem Fairfield Shipyard. Her keel was laid on 7 December 1942. She was launched on 15 January 1943 and delivered on 28 January. Laid up at Mobile post-war, she was scrapped at Panama City, Florida in October 1971.

== Thomas Ruffin ==
Thomas Ruffin was built by Bethlehem Fairfield Shipyard. Her keel was laid on 9 March 1942. She was launched on 18 May and delivered on 10 June. Built for the WSA, she was operated under the management of A. H. Bull & Co. She was torpedoed and damaged in the Gulf of Mexico 175 nautical miles (324 km) off the coast of French Guinea by U-510 on 9 March 1943 whilst on a voyage from Suez, Egypt to a port in British Guinea. She was towed in to Trinidad, then to Mobile, where she was declared a constructive total loss. Laid up, she was scrapped there in 1946.

== Thomas Say ==
Thomas Say was built by Todd Houston Shipbuilding. Her keel was laid on 4 February 1944. She was launched on 14 March and delivered on 25 March. Built for the WSA, she was operated under the management of United States Navigation Co. Management transferred to Dichmann, Wright & Pugh in 1946. Sold later that year to South Atlantic Maritime Co. and renamed Atlantic Trader. Reflagged to Panama and operated under the management of Boyd, Weir & Sewell Inc. Management transferred to S. Livanos & Co. in 1948, then Maritime Brokers Inc. in 1952. Sold in 1953 to Atlantic Freighters Ltd. Operated under the management of S. Livanos Ltd. Sold in 1967 to Jadranska Slobodna Plovidba, Split and renamed Split. She was scrapped at Split in July 1967.

== Thomas Scott ==
Thomas Scott was built by Delta Shipbuilding Co. Her keel was laid on 1 August 1942. She was launched on 10 October and delivered on 31 October. Built for the WSA, she was operated under the management of Waterman Steamship Corporation. She was torpedoed and damaged in the Kola Inlet (69°30′N 34°42′E) by U-968 on 17 February 1945 whilst on a voyage from Murmansk to a British port. She was taken in tow by a Soviet Navy destroyer, but broke in two and sank.

== Thomas Sim Lee ==
Thomas Sim Lee was built by Bethlehem Fairfield Shipyard. Her keel was laid on 23 September 1943. She was launched on 24 October and delivered on 31 October. Laid up at Beaumont post-war, she was scrapped at Brownsville, Texas in July 1972.

== Thomas Sinnickson ==
Thomas Sinnickson was built by Delta Shipbuilding Co. Her keel was laid on 10 August 1942. She was launched on 14 October and delivered on 5 November. Built for the WSA, she was operated under the management of Waterman Steamship Corporation. She was torpedoed and damaged in the Atlantic Ocean 75 nautical miles (139 km) east of Fortaleza, Brazil (3°51′S 36°22′W) by U-185 on 7 July 1943 whilst on a voyage from Bandar Shapur to Paramaribo, Brazil. She was shelled and sunk by a convoy escort the next day.

== Thomas Stone ==
Thomas Stone was built by Bethlehem Fairfield Shipyard. Her keel was laid on 20 October 1941. She was launched on 12 April 1942 and delivered on 16 May. Laid up in the James River post-war, she was scrapped at Philadelphia in February 1972.

== Thomas Sully ==
Thomas Sully was built by St. Johns River Shipbuilding Company. Her keel was laid on 16 June 1943. She was launched on 11 September and delivered on 27 September. Built for the WSA, she was operated under the management of Calmar Steamship Co. Sold in 1947 to Neptune Shipping Ltda. and renamed Actor. Reflagged to Panama and operated under the management of Torry Mosvold. Sold in 1949 to Sicilia Società di Navigazione per Servizi Liberi, Italy and renamed Città di Palermo. Operated under the management of Count Salvatore Tagliavia. Sold in 1952 to Siciliana Società di Navigazione per Azioni, Palermo, Sicily, Italy. She was scrapped at Vado Ligure, Italy in April 1963.

== Thomas Sumter ==
Thomas Sumter was built by North Carolina Shipbuilding Company. Her keel was laid on 25 February 1942. She was launched on 31 May and delivered on 17 June. Laid up at Mobile post-war, she was scrapped at Panama City, Florida in August 1971.

== Thomas Todd ==
Thomas Todd was built by J. A. Jones Construction Co., Brunswick. Her keel was laid on 14 August 1942. She was launched on 19 May 1943 and delivered on 30 June. Built for the WSA, she was operated under the management of Standard Fruit Co. Laid up in the Hudson River post-war, she was scrapped at Valencia, Spain in March 1971.

== Thomas T. Tucker ==
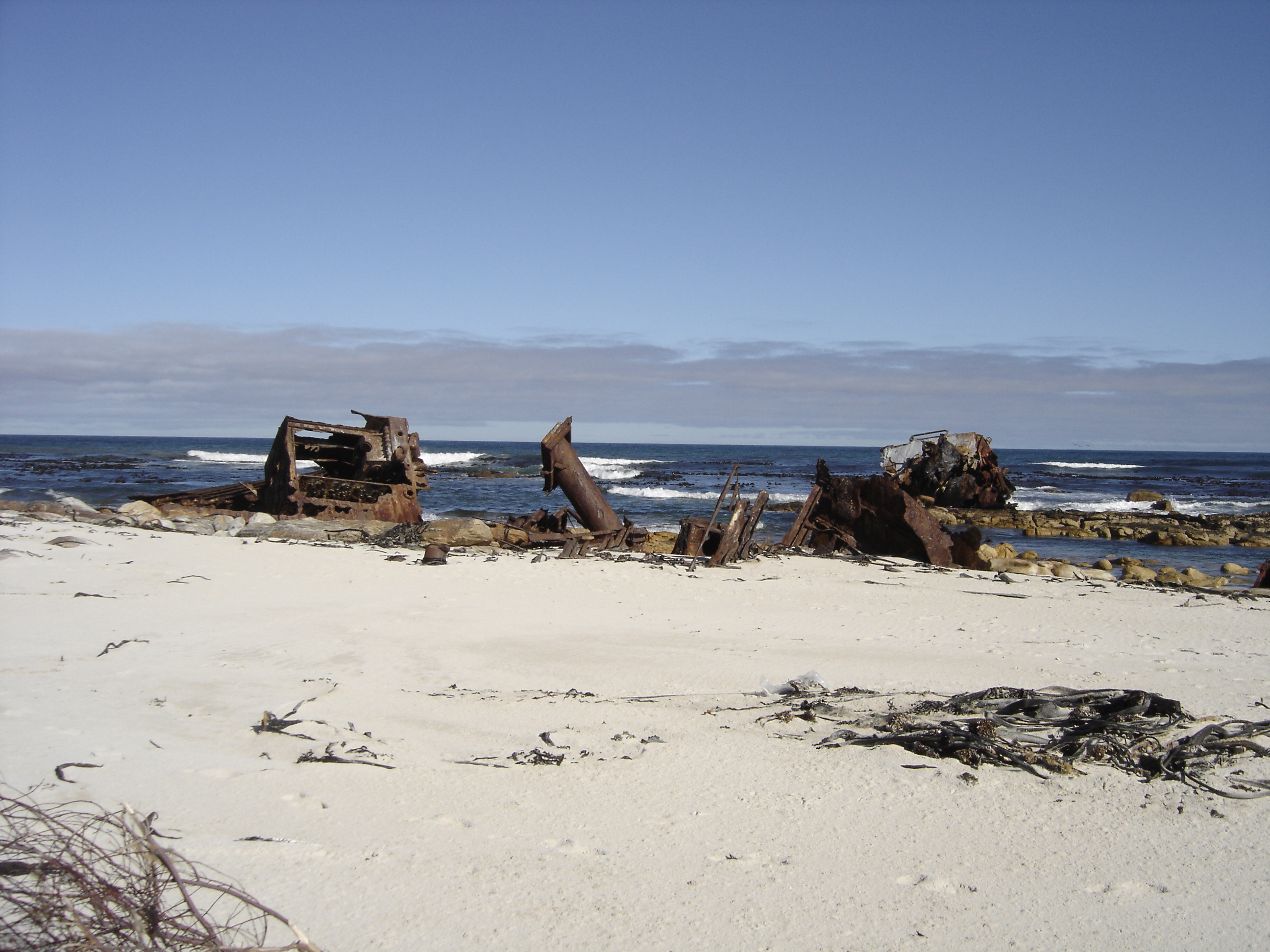
The wreck of Thomas T. Tucker in 2006.

Thomas T. Tucker was built by Todd Houston Shipbuilding. Her keel was laid on 16 June 1942. She was launched on 31 August and delivered on 21 September. Built for the WSA, she was operated under the management of Merchants & Miners Transportation Co. She came ashore at Olifants Bosch Point, Union of South Africa (34°16′S 18°23′E) on 28 November 1942 whilst on a voyage from New Orleans to Table Bay and Suez. She broke in three and was a total loss.

== Thomas U. Walter ==
Thomas U. Walter was built by Bethlehem Fairfield Shipyard. Her keel was laid on 28 June 1943. She was launched on 25 July and delivered on 31 July. She was scrapped at Philadelphia in August 1966.

== Thomas W. Bickett ==
Thomas W. Bickett was built by North Carolina Shipbuilding Company. Her keel was laid on 9 March 1943. She was launched on 9 April and delivered on 15 April. She was scrapped at Kearny in 1966.

== Thomas W. Gregory ==
Thomas W. Gregory was built by Todd Houston Shipbuilding. Her keel was laid on 20 August 1943. She was launched on 6 October and delivered on 19 October. Built for the WSA, she was operated under the management of American Liberty Steamship Co. Sold in 1948 to Lorentzens Rederi Co., Oslo. Sold in 1949 to Belships Company Ltd. Skibs A/S, Oslo and renamed Belfri. Operated under the management of Smith & Co. New diesel engine fitted at La Spezia by Ansaldo in 1954.

== Thomas W. Hyde ==
Thomas W. Hyde was built by New England Shipbuilding Corporation. Her keel was laid on 6 March 1943. She was launched on 5 May and delivered on 14 May. She was scrapped at New Orleans in October 1964.

== Thomas W. Murray ==
Thomas W. Murray was built by Southeastern Shipbuilding Corporation, Savannah, Georgia. Her keel was laid on 23 December 1944. She was launched on 31 January 1945 and delivered on 24 February. Built for the WSA, she was operated under the management of Cosmopolitan Shipping Co. Laid up at Mobile in 1948. Sold in 1951 to Phoenix Steamship Co. and renamed Seaglamour. Sold later that year to Southatlantic Navigation Corp. Operated under the management of Orion Shipping & Trading Co. Renamed Barbara Michel in 1954. Sold later that year to Ocean Carriers Inc. and renamed Ocean Alice. Reflagged to Liberia and operated under the management of Maritime Overseas Corp. Management transferred to Seatraders Inc. in 1956, then back to Maritime Overseas Corp. in 1957. Sold in 1959 to Sea Liberties Inc. and renamed Barbara Michel. Reflagged to the United States, remaining under the same management. Renamed Pacific Isle, then Ocean Alice later that year. Sold in 1961 to Ventures Shipping & Trading Corp. and renamed Lisa B. Operated under the management of Sealanes Management Corp. Sold in 1964 to Grace Navigation Corp. and renamed Grand Grace. Reflagged to Liberia and operated under the management of Sea King Corp. She was scrapped at Kaohsiung in December 1968.

== Thomas W. Owen ==
Thomas W. Owen was built by North Carolina Shipbuilding Company. Her keel was laid on 21 June 1943. She was launched on 24 July and delivered on 31 July. She was scrapped at Kearny in 1964.

== Thomas W. Symons ==
Thomas W. Symons was built by Oregon Shipbuilding Corporation. Her keel was laid on 1 July 1943. She was launched on 22 July and delivered on 29 July. She was scrapped at Tacoma in October 1961.

== Thomas Wolfe ==
Thomas Wolfe was built by Southeastern Shipbuilding Corporation. Her keel was laid on 6 November 1943. She was launched on 15 December and delivered on 28 December. She was scrapped at New Orleans in June 1965.

== Thorstein Veblen ==
Thorstein Veblen was built by Bethlehem Fairfield Shipyard. Her keel was laid on 29 June 1943. She was launched on 28 July and delivered on 9 August. She was scrapped at Philadelphia in March 1965.

== Timothy Bloodworth ==
Timothy Bloodworth was built by Delta Shipbuilding Co. Her keel was laid on 4 February 1943. She was launched on 17 March and delivered on 22 April. She was scrapped at Portland, Oregon in November 1963.

== Timothy Dwight ==
Timothy Dwight was built by New England Shipbuilding Corporation. Her keel was laid on 4 January 1943. She was launched on 7 March and delivered on 20 March. She was scrapped at Kearny in October 1963.

== Timothy Pickering ==
Timothy Pickering was built by Permanente Metals Corporation. Her keel was laid on 8 October 1941. She was launched on 28 March 1942 and delivered on 30 April. Built for the WSA, she was operated under the management of American President Lines. She was torpedoed and set afire by aircraft in the Mediterranean Sea off Avola, Sicily (37°00′N 15°21′E) on 13 July 1943 whilst on a voyage from Alexandria to Avola. She was scuttled by Allied warships. The wreck was sold in 1948 to shipbreakers in Genoa.

== T. J. Jackson ==
T. J. Jackson was built by Delta Shipbuilding Co. Her keel was laid on 16 October 1941. She was launched on 23 April 1942 and delivered on 25 June. She was scrapped at Boston, Massachusetts in 1960.

== Tobias E. Stansbury ==
Tobias E. Stansbury was a tanker built by Delta Shipbuilding Co. Her keel was laid on 25 May 1943. She was launched on 14 July and delivered on 16 September. Built for the WSA, she was operated under the management of Marine Transport Lines. Sold in 1948 to Epiphany Tankers Corp. and renamed Wanda. Operated under the management of Fanmaur Shipping & Trading Co. Sold in 1954 to Wanda Compania Navigaition, Panama and renamed Kyra. Reflagged to Liberia and operated under the management of her previous owners. Converted to a cargo ship at Baltimore in 1957 and renamed Taxiarch. Now 7,280 GRT. Sold in 1958 to Epiphany Tankers Corp. and renamed Pandora. Reflagged to the United States. Sold in 1963 to Transasia Steamship Co., New York and renamed Ponderosa. Sold in 1965 to Astrogrande Compania Navigation, Panama. Reflagged to Liberia and operated under the management of Rethymnis Steamship Agency. She ran aground off Topar Island, Chile on 17 February 1967 whilst on a voyage from Necochea, Argentina to Callao, Peru. She was refloated and beached in Molyneux Bay on 7 March.. Refloated on 16 March and declared a constructive total loss. She was sold for use as a fish factory ship.

== Tobias Lear ==
Tobias Lear was built by New England Shipbuilding Corporation. Her keel was laid on 24 July 1943. She was launched on 11 September and delivered on 22 September. To the Dutch Government in 1944 under Lend-Lease and renamed Fort Orange. Operated under the management of Holland America Line, Rotterdam. Reported to have been renamed Erasmus in 1946, but change apparently reverted. Sold to her managers in 1947 and renamed Blijendijk. Sold in 1957 to Ditta Luigi Pittaluigi Vapori, Genoa and renamed Transilvania. Sold in 1965 to Mount Athos Shipping Co. and renamed Mount Atho. Reflagged to Liberia and operated under the management of Dynamic Shipping Inc. She ran aground off the Rio Grande do Sul, Brazil (30°31′S 50°20′W) on 11 March 1967 whilst on a voyage from Tampa, Florida to Porto Alegre, Brazil. She was declared a compromised total loss.

== Tomas Guardia ==
Tomas Guardia was built by Todd Houston Shipbuilding. Her keel was laid on 27 May 1944. She was launched on 30 June and delivered on 12 July. She was scrapped at New Orleans in 1964.

== Tom Treanor ==
Tom Treanor was a boxed aircraft transport built by New England Shipbuilding Corporation. Her keel was laid on 11 June 1945. She was launched on 31 August and delivered on 11 October. She was scrapped at Terminal Island in April 1968.

== Toussaint L'Ouverture ==
Toussaint L'Ouverture was built by Permanente Metals Corporation. Her keel was laid on 12 March 1944. She was launched on 4 April and delivered on 12 April. She was scrapped at Baltimore in May 1959.

== Townsend Harris ==
Townsend Harris was built by Bethlehem Fairfield Shipyard. Her keel was laid on 18 June 1943. She was launched on 24 July and delivered on 31 July. She was scrapped at Philadelphia in September 1967.

== Tristram Dalton ==
Tristram Dalton

Tristram Dalton was a limited troop carrier built by Bethlehem Fairfield Shipyard. Her keel was laid on 6 July 1942. She was launched on 27 August and delivered on 9 September. Built for the WSA, she was operated under the management of A. H. Bull & Co. Sold to her managers in 1947 and renamed Rosario. Sold in 1954 to Isla Colon Compania Navigation, Panama and renamed Achileus. Reflagged to Liberia and operated under the management of Orion Shipping & Trading Co. Renamed Andros Laurel in 1957. Sold later that year to Jackson Steamship Co. Operated under the management of Suwannee Steamship Co. Sold in 1963 to Faith Navigation Co. and renamed Grand Faith. Operated under the management of Sea King Corp. She was scrapped at Kaohsiung in December 1968.

== T. S. Gold ==
T. S. Gold was built by New England Shipbuilding Corporation. Her keel was laid on 5 December 1944. She was launched on 23 January 1945 and delivered on 6 February. Built for the WSA, she was operated under the management of Wessel, Duval & Co. Sold in 1951 to Steelcraft Steamship Co., New York and renamed Chian Breeze. Sold in 1954 to Chian Steamship Co. and renamed Delphin. Reflagged to Liberia and operated under the management of Martran Steamship Co. Reflagged to Greece in 1960. Sold in 1964 to Reliance Maritime Corp., Panama and renamed Ever Blessing. Reflagged to Liberia and operated under the management of First Steamship Co. She ran aground off Jeju Island, South Korea (33°21′N 126°11′E) on 19 April 1967 whilst on a voyage from Inchon to Keelung. She was refloated on 29 April and found to be severely damaged. She was scrapped at Hirao in August 1967.

== Tutuila ==
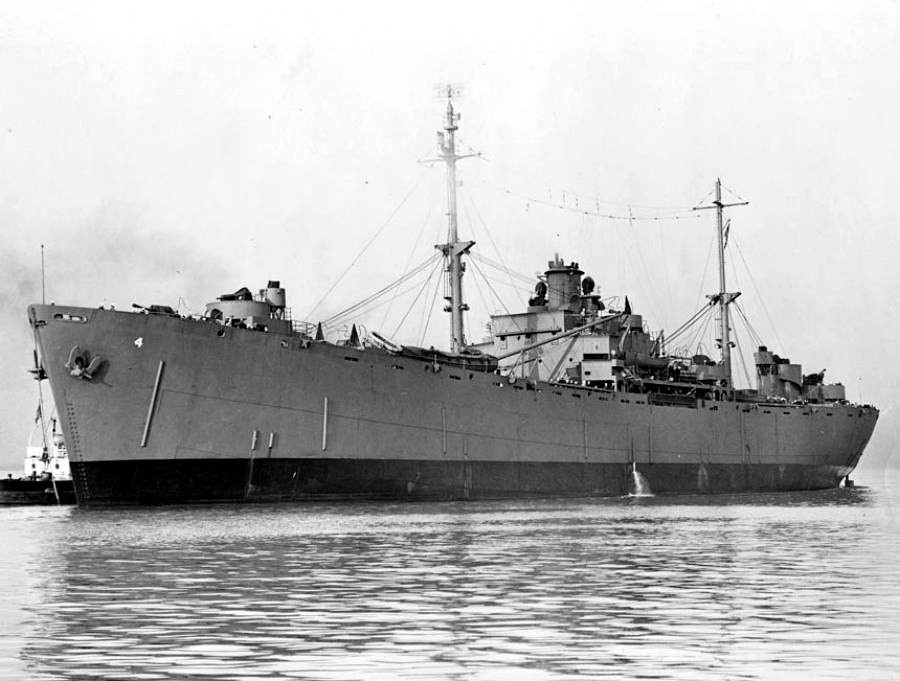
USS Tutuila

Tutuila was built by Bethlehem Fairfield Shipyard. Her keel was laid on 11 August 1943. She was renamed Tutuila before being launched on 12 September and Delivered to the United States Navy on 18 September. She served as a floating advanced base. Laid up in reserve at Galveston, Texas in December 1946. Recommissioned in May 1951. Participated in the naval quarantine of Cuba during the Cuban Missile Crisis in October–November 1962. Assisted in supplying petrol to the Dominion Republic in 1963-64 after rebels had prevented normal tanker deliveries. Transferred to Taiwanese Navy on 21 February 1972 and renamed Pien Tai. Stricken in 1979.
