= Shepard Steamship Company =

Shipping Company

- Industry: Shipping, transportation
- Founded: 1930 in 31 Milk Street, Boston, Massachusetts, United States
- Area served: Intercoastal Service
- Key people: Otis N Shepard, H B, Shepard, Francis Parker Shepard, Charles L Stanton, David Dysart and E J Martin.

Shepard Steamship Company of Boston, Massachusetts was founded in 1930 by Otis N Shepard, and H B, Shepard with service from Pacific Coast to Philadelphia, New York City, Albany and Boston. Service was called the Shepard Line Shepard Steamship Company moved to 21 West Street, New York City in 1947. The Shepard Steamship Company's main cargo was lumber products. Otis N Shepard company, Otis Shepard & Co. partnered with George H. Morse in 1868 to form Shepard & Morse Lumber Company of Burlington, Vermont. During World War II the Shepard Steamship Company was active in charter shipping with the Maritime Commission and War Shipping Administration. During wartime, the Shepard Steamship Company operated Victory ships and Liberty ships. The ship was run by its crew and the US Navy supplied United States Navy Armed Guards to man the deck guns and radio. The most common armament mounted on these merchant ships were the MK II 20mm Oerlikon autocannon and the 3"/50, 4"/50, and 5"/38 deck guns.

== Ships ==
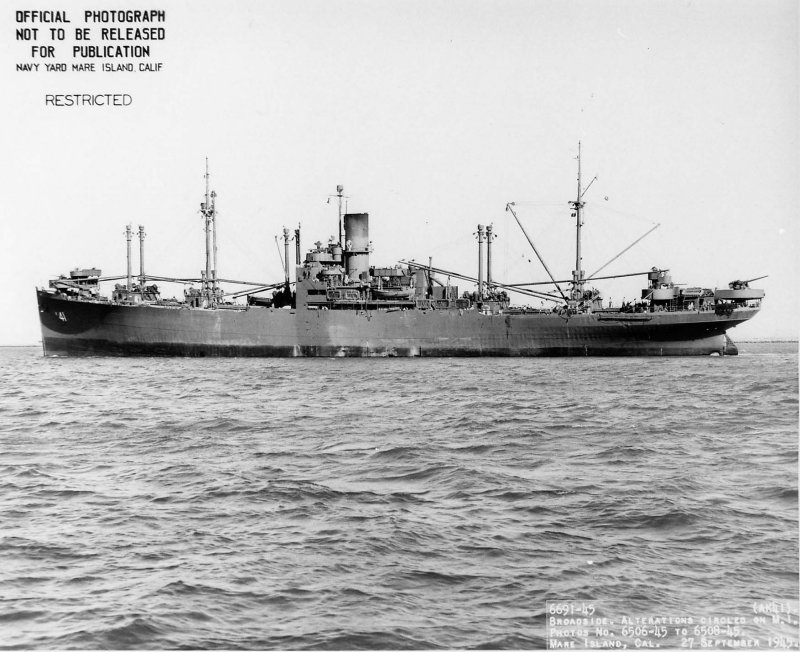
SS Exporter in 1945

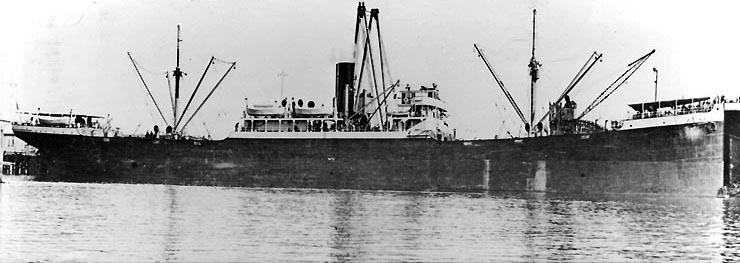
SS Exford in 1919

- SS Harpoon, was SS Hopatcong built in 1920, became Empire Tarpon 1940
- SS Sea Thrush, built in 1920, sank by U-505 June 28, 1942 off Bahamas
- SS Timber Rush, was City of Eureka from 1925 to 1928, built in 1919, sank in 1940 off Acapulco
- SS Sage Brush, sank as SS Keystone in 1943, a 1919 5,565 tons, cargo ship
- SS Exporter, was USS Hercules, a 1939 cargo ship
- SS Wind Rush, was SS Westbrook built in 1918 by Columbia River SB, ablaze in the Caribbean Dec. 21 1939, repaired, became Kavkaz in 1945, and scrapped 1977
- SS Wind Rush (2), was SS Lloyd S. Carlson Liberty ship, built in 1945
- SS Exford built in 1919

== World War II Ships ==
Ships operated under charter during and just after World War II:

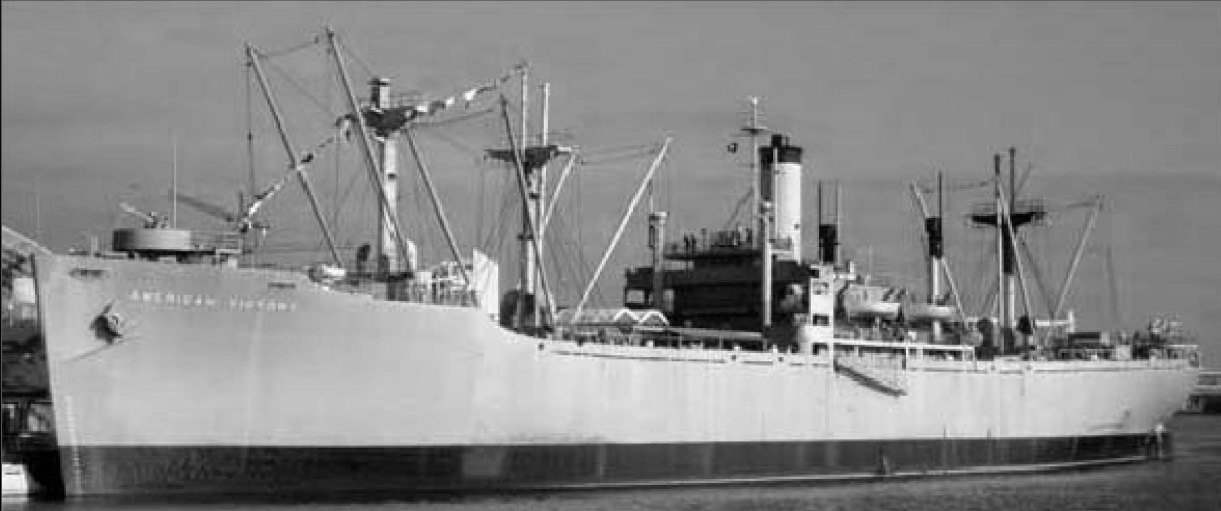
A VC2-S-AP2 type Victory ship

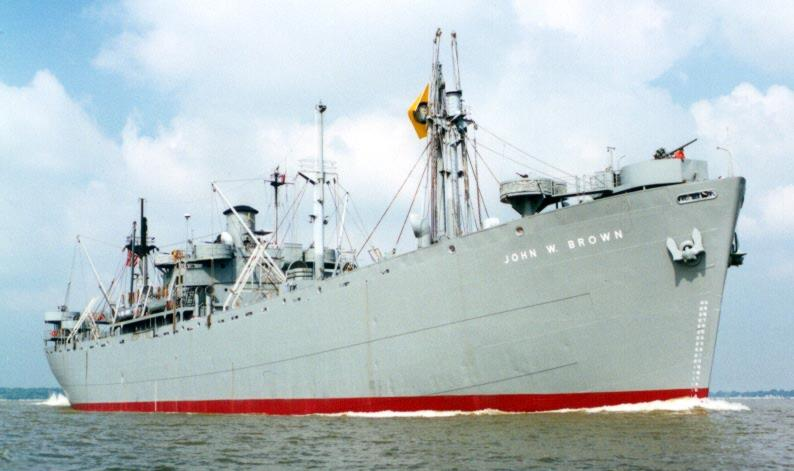
SS John W. Brown, one of four surviving Liberty ships in 2000

  - Victory ships:
- La Grande Victory (troopship)
- Binghampton Victory
- N. Y. U. Victory
  - Liberty ships:
- Theodore Foster
- Warren P. Marks
- Edwin Abbey
- Segundo Ruiz-Belvis
- John A. Dix
- John P. Harris
- George E. Waldo
- George H. Himes
- George M. Cohan
- Lot Whitcomb
- Charles H. Lanham (Mashal plan ship)
- Clarence F. Peck
- Robert D. Carey
  - For Korean War:
- Harpoon (1950 to 1954) (was Ward Hunt)
