= USS Protector (AGR-11) =

US Navy ship

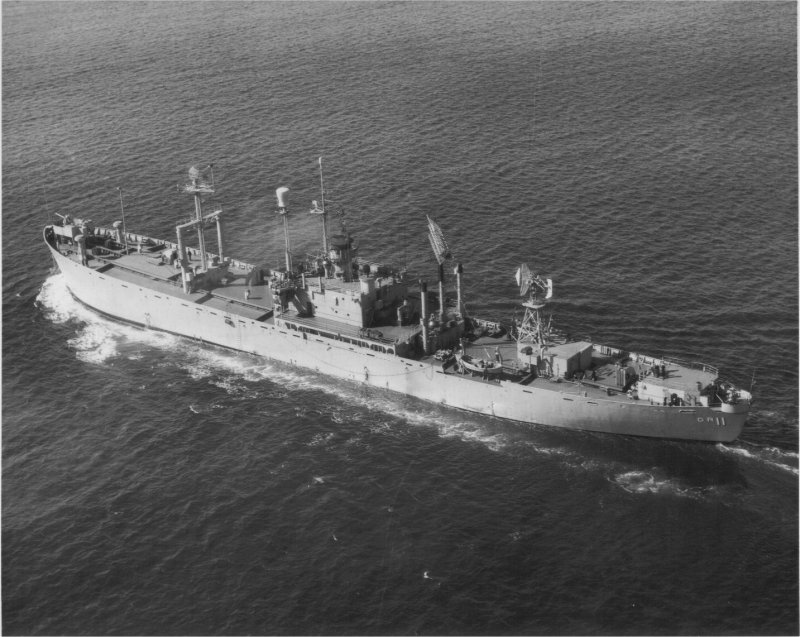
- USS Protector (AGR-11), underway, 12 October 1960, place unknown.

History

United States
- Name: Warren P. Marks
- Namesake: Warren P. Marks
- Owner: War Shipping Administration (WSA)
- Operator: Shepard Steamship Company
- Ordered: as type (EC2-S-C5) hull, MC hull 2346
- Builder: J.A. Jones Construction, Panama City, Florida
- Cost: $1,006,824
- Yard number: 87
- Way number: 5
- Laid down: 31 January 1945
- Launched: 15 March 1945
- Sponsored by: Mrs. E. M. Hinson
- Completed: 29 March 1945
- Identification: Call sign: ANQH
- Fate: Acquired by US Navy, 1957

United States
- Name: Protector
- Namesake: A guard or guardian
- Commissioned: 20 February 1957
- Decommissioned: 28 July 1965
- Reclassified: Guardian-class radar picket ship
- Refit: Charleston Naval Shipyard, Charleston, South Carolina
- Identification: Hull symbol: YAGR-11 (1957–1958); Hull symbol: AGR-11 (1958–1965); IMO number: 8628341
- Fate: Placed in National Defense Reserve Fleet, Hudson River Reserve Fleet, Jones Point, New York, 1 April 1965; Sold for scrapping, 30 November 2005

General characteristics
- Class & type: Liberty ship; type EC2-S-C5, boxed aircraft transport
- Tonnage: 10,600 LT DWT; 7,200 GRT
- Displacement: 3,380 long tons (3,434 t) (light); 14,245 long tons (14,474 t) (max)
- Length: 441 feet 6 inches (135 m) oa; 416 feet (127 m) pp; 427 feet (130 m) lwl
- Beam: 57 feet (17 m)
- Draft: 27 ft 9.25 in (8.4646 m)
- Installed power: 2 × Oil fired 450 °F (232 °C) boilers, operating at 220 psi (1,500 kPa); 2,500 hp (1,900 kW)
- Propulsion: 1 × triple-expansion steam engine, (manufactured by General Machinery Corp., Hamilton, Ohio); 1 × screw propeller
- Speed: 11.5 knots (21.3 km/h; 13.2 mph)
- Capacity: 490,000 cubic feet (13,875 m^{3}) (bale)
- Complement: 38–62 USMM; 21–40 USNAG
- Armament: Varied by ship; Bow-mounted 3-inch (76 mm)/50-caliber gun; Stern-mounted 4-inch (102 mm)/50-caliber gun; 2–8 × single 20-millimeter (0.79 in) Oerlikon anti-aircraft (AA) cannons and/or, 2–8 × 37-millimeter (1.46 in) M1 AA guns

General characteristics (US Navy refit)
- Class & type: Guardian-class radar picket ship
- Capacity: 443,646 US gallons (1,679,383 L; 369,413 imp gal) (fuel oil); 68,267 US gallons (258,419 L; 56,844 imp gal) (diesel); 15,082 US gallons (57,092 L; 12,558 imp gal) (fresh water); 1,326,657 US gallons (5,021,943 L; 1,104,673 imp gal) (fresh water ballast)
- Complement: 13 officers; 138 enlisted
- Armament: 2 × 3 inches (76 mm)/50 caliber guns

USS Protector (AGR/YAGR-11) was a Guardian-class radar picket ship of the United States Navy. A Liberty Ship acquired in 1957, she was reconfigured as a radar picket ship and assigned to radar picket duty in the North Atlantic Ocean as part of the Distant Early Warning Line.

== Construction ==
The third ship to be so named by the Navy, Protector (YAGR–11) was laid down on 31 January 1945, under a Maritime Commission (MARCOM) contract, MC hull 2346, as the Liberty Ship Warren P. Marks, by J.A. Jones Construction, Panama City, Florida. She was launched 15 March 1945; sponsored by Mrs. E. M. Hinson; and delivered 29 March 1945, to the Shepard Steamship Company.

== Service history ==
Operated by the Shepard Steamship Co., from 1945 to 1957, Warren P. Marks was converted Charleston Navy Yard, Charleston, South Carolina, and commissioned Protector (YAGR–11), 20 February 1957.

After shakedown off Guantanamo Bay, Cuba, Protector, homeported at Davisville, Rhode Island, reported to Commandant, 1st Naval District for administrative control and to Commander YAGR Division 21 for duty and was assigned as an Ocean Station Radar Picket Ship in the seaward extension of the Eastern Continental Air Defense Command (CONAD)'s Contiguous Radar Coverage System.

Continuing her duties off the US East Coast, Protector was redesignated AGR-11 on 28 October 1958. She continued her radar picket duty until 1965. During the Cuban invasion in the spring of 1962, and the Cuban Missile Crisis in the fall, Protector operated in the Florida Straits and established a new radar picket station.

On 10 February 1965, Protector terminated picket duty as the last picket ship to man Radar Picket Station No. 15 of NORAD Contiguous Radar Coverage System.

== Decommissioning ==
On 28 July 1965, she decommissioned at Bayonne, New Jersey, and was placed in the US Maritime Administration (MARAD) National Defense Reserve Fleet, Hudson River Reserve Fleet, Jones Point, New York, as an Emergency Relocation Center Ship, where she remained until she was towed to the Norfolk Naval Shipyard where her engine was removed. She was then placed for sale as scrap, with scrapping completed 30 November 2005.

== Military awards and honors ==
Protector's crew was eligible for the following medals:

- Navy Expeditionary Medal (2-Cuba)
- National Defense Service Medal

== See also ==
- United States Navy
- Radar picket

== Bibliography ==
- "Protector II (YAGR-11)". Dictionary of American Naval Fighting Ships. Navy Department, Naval History and Heritage Command. 25 August 2015. This article incorporates text from this source, which is in the public domain.
- "Jones Construction, Panama City FL". www.ShipbuildingHistory.com. 13 October 2010.
- Davies, James (May 2004). "Specifications (As-Built)" (PDF). p. 23.
- "SS Warren P. Marks".
- "USS Protector (AGR-11)". NavSource. 11 April 2019.
