= SS Exporter =

SS Exporter may refer to one of these ships built for or owned by American Export Lines:

- SS Exporter (1939) (MC hull number 34, Type C3-E), built by Bethlehem Shipbuilding (Quincy, Massachusetts); acquired by the United States Navy as cargo ship USS Hercules (AK-41); sold for commercial service in 1946; scrapped in 1971
- SS Exporter (1945) (MC hull number 2253, Type C3-S-A3), built by Bethlehem Sparrows Point; delivered December 1945; scrapped in 1972
