= USS West Carnifax =

Cargo ship in United States navy

USS West Carnifax (ID-3812)
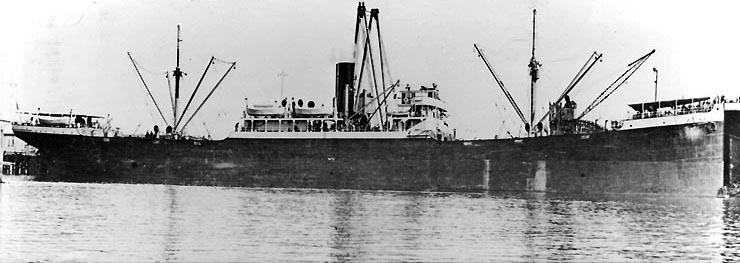
- West Carnifax in port after World War I

History

United States
- Name: 1919–1929: West Carnifax; 1928–1933: Exford; 1933–1943: Pan Royal
- Owner: 1919–c. 1928: US Shipping Board; 1928–1933: Export Steamship Corp.; 1933–1943: Pan Atlantic Steamship Co.
- Operator: 1925–1927: American Republics Line; 1928–1933: American Export Lines; 1933: Shepard Line; 1934–1943: Pan Atlantic Steamship Co.
- Builder: Southwestern Shipbuilding; San Pedro, California
- Yard number: 1
- Launched: 19 October 1918
- Sponsored by: Miss Marcoreta Hellman
- Completed: January 1919
- Acquired: January 1919
- Commissioned: 31 December 1918
- Identification: Official Number: 217373
- Fate: Sunk in collision, 9 February 1943

General characteristics
- Type: Cargo ship
- Tonnage: 5,799 GRT; 8,594 LT DWT
- Displacement: 12,200 t
- Length: 410 ft 5 in (125.10 m) (LPP); 427 ft (130 m) (LOA)
- Beam: 54 ft 6 in (17 m)
- Draft: 24 ft 1 in (7.34 m) (mean)
- Propulsion: 1 × triple-expansion steam engine
- Speed: 10.5 knots (19.4 km/h; 12.1 mph)
- Complement: 83 (as USS West Carnifax)
- Armament: None

USS West Carnifax (ID-3812) was a cargo ship in the United States Navy shortly after World War I. After she was decommissioned from the Navy, the ship was known as SS West Carnifax, SS Exford, and SS Pan Royal (or sometimes Pan-Royal) in civilian service under American registry.

West Carnifax was one of the West boats, a series of steel-hulled cargo ships built for the United States Shipping Board (USSB) on the West Coast of the United States. The ship was the first ship built at Southwestern Shipbuilding in San Pedro, California, and was launched in October 1918 and delivered to the US Navy upon completion in late December. After commissioning, West Carnifax sailed from California with a load of wheat flour for the East Coast of the United States and, from there, to Europe. When she docked at Hamburg, Germany, in March 1919, she became the first American ship to dock at Hamburg since before the start of World War I. At the conclusion of her trip to Germany she was decommissioned and returned to the USSB.

West Carnifax sailed to European ports for a time and in South American service for the American Republics Line while under USSB ownership. After her sale for operation by the American Export Lines in 1928, she began sailing in Mediterranean service. After a rename to SS Exford later in 1928, she was used on a cargo service to Soviet Black Sea ports, and became the first American ship to dock in the Soviet Union since World War I. After a brief stint in intercoastal service, the ship was renamed Pan Royal in 1933 for service with a subsidiary of the Waterman Steamship Company. In convoy sailing during World War II, Pan Royal made two roundtrips between the United States and the United Kingdom, and one roundtrip to North Africa. At the beginning of her second voyage to Africa in February 1943, Pan Royal was accidentally rammed by two other convoy ships and sunk. Eight crewmen died in the accident.

== Design and construction ==
The West ships were cargo ships of similar size and design built by several shipyards on the West Coast of the United States for the USSB for emergency use during World War I. All were given names that began with the word West, like West Carnifax, the first of some 18 West ships built by Southwestern Shipbuilding.

West Carnifax (Southwestern Shipbuilding No. 1) was laid down on 17 July as the first ship of the new Southwestern Shipbuilding shipyard. She was launched at 09:30 on 19 October 1918 by sponsor Marcoreta Hellman, the six-year-old daughter of yard superintendent Marco Hellman. (Note: West Carnifax's launching ceremony had been delayed by seven days by the Emergency Fleet Corporation for public health considerations: public gatherings had been banned in order to combat the spread of Spanish flu. When the ceremony did take place, it was before a private crowd; the invitations of guests had all been withdrawn.) When West Carnifax was delivered to the United States Navy upon completion in late December, the Los Angeles Times heralded the 134-workday completion time as a "world record" for the completion of a new ship in a new shipyard.

West Carnifax was 5,799 gross register tons (GRT), and was 410 feet 5 inches (125.10 m) long (between perpendiculars) and 54 feet 6 inches (16.61 m) abeam. West Carnifax had a steel hull, a mean draft of 24 feet 1 inch (7.34 m), and a displacement of 12,211 t. The ship had a single triple-expansion steam engine that drove a single screw propeller, and moved the ship at up to 10.5 knots (19.4 km/h; 12.1 mph).

== Military career ==
USS West Carnifax (ID-3812) was commissioned into the Naval Overseas Transportation Service (NOTS) at San Pedro, California, on 31 December 1918. West Carnifax sailed from San Pedro on 4 January 1919 for San Francisco, where she took on an initial load of flour. (Note: Many West ships, to avoid sailing empty to the East Coast, loaded grain products intended for the United Kingdom, France, and Italy and sailed to Europe without unloading or transferring their cargo. This avoided extra handling of the cargo and the United States Shipping Board, by prior arrangement, then received an equivalent amount of cargo space in foreign ships for other American cargos.) She sailed for Norfolk, Virginia, on 31 January, and arrived at Hampton Roads on 15 March.

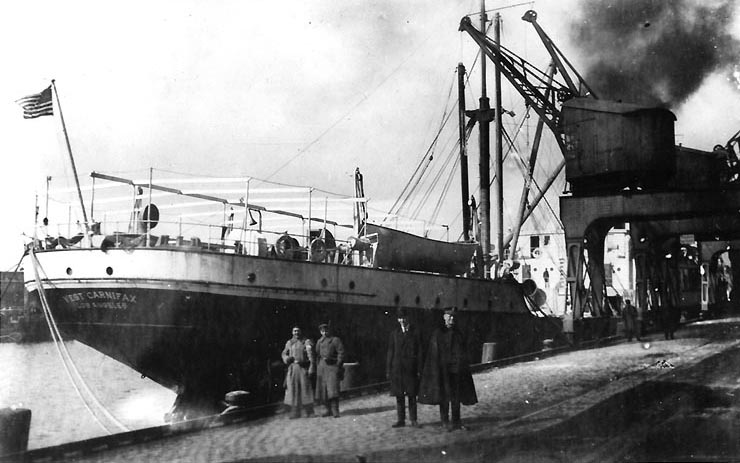
West Carnifax docked at a European port, c. 1919

Setting out four days later, West Carnifax was slated to sail to Danzig via Falmouth and the Hook of Holland, but was diverted en route. When she arrived at her new destination of Hamburg on 25 March, she became the first American ship to dock in that city since before World War I had begun over 4 1/2 years before. When she had completed unloading her cargo of flour, noted as the "choicest California flour" by onlookers, she sailed for New Orleans by way of Plymouth on 2 April. On 9 May, four days after her arrival at New Orleans, West Carnifax was decommissioned and returned to the USSB.

== Interwar years ==
Incomplete information is available regarding West Carnifax's activities after her return to the USSB in 1919. One incident of note was reported in The New York Times in February 1922. The news item reported that West Carnifax, while heading from Rotterdam to Galveston, Texas, ran short of provisions and fuel and had to be towed into New York by United States Coast Guard cutter USCGC Tampa (WPG-48). By late 1923, West Carnifax had been laid up at Norfolk, Virginia, but was reactivated and reconditioned in February 1924. In early 1925, West Carnifax had begun sailing for American Republics Lines, a USSB-owned line that sailed in South American service. (Note: American Republics Lines later became a subsidiary of Moore-McCormack Lines, Inc.) West Carnifax sailed in this service into 1927 and called at ports like Buenos Aires and Santos.

In early 1928, West Carnifax was sold to the Export Steamship Corporation for operation under their American Export Lines brand. In the first half of that year, West Carnifax was sailing in New York – Mediterranean service. While near the Azores sailing from Alexandria, Egypt, to Boston in October, West Carnifax responded to an SOS from the American tanker David C. Reid which reported being in trouble during a storm. According to a report in the Los Angeles Times, when the cargo ship arrived at the specified location after steaming overnight, no trace of the crew was found; only oil slicks and a floating vegetable box were found on the surface. In October the following year, under her new name of SS Exford, the ship docked at the Soviet Black Sea port of Novorossiysk to deliver a cargo of machinery and became the first American ship to dock at a Soviet port since the end of World War I. Exford remained in Black Sea service into 1931.

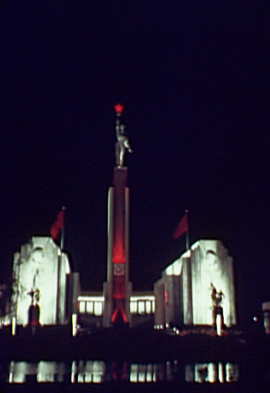
"Big Joe", the figure with the red star (center) in front of the Soviet Pavilion at the New York World's Fair, was returned to the Soviet Union by Pan Royal.

In August 1933, the Los Angeles Times reported that the Shepard Line had secured a year-long charter of Exford for their expanded intercoastal service between North Atlantic ports and the Pacific ports of Los Angeles; San Francisco; Portland, Oregon; and Seattle. Later in 1933, the ship was renamed Pan Royal to reflect the naming style of her new owners, the Pan-Atlantic Steamship Company, a subsidiary of Waterman Steamship Company. The Pan-Atlantic Line sailed in coastal service along the Atlantic and Gulf coasts, and it is likely that Pan Royal called at typical Pan-Atlantic ports such as Baltimore, Miami, Tampa, New Orleans, Philadelphia, New York, and Boston from this time.

At 03:50 on 24 September 1934, Cunard-White Star ocean liner RMS Laconia collided with Pan Royal in a thick fog off the tip of Cape Cod. (Note: US Navy submarine S-4 had sunk in almost the exact spot in 1927.) Pan Royal developed a leak and had to return to Boston, from which she had left for Galveston, Texas, the previous day. Laconia, leaving Boston after debarking 225 passengers, also had damage but proceeded to her destination of New York under her own power. No one was injured on either ship. Elvar R. Callaway, master of Pan Royal, claimed that Laconia could have avoided the collision by proper steering; Laconia's master, B. B. Orum, contended that the collision was unavoidable because of the "impenetrable haze".

In November 1939, Pan Royal was one of 21 ships that had been idled because of a strike by 5,000 longshoremen in New York. In June the following year, The Christian Science Monitor reported that Pan Royal had been engaged to return "Big Joe" to the Soviet Union. "Big Joe" was a nickname given to the 79-foot-tall (24 m) Soviet worker holding a red star in his up-stretched hand. The statue had graced the column in front of the Soviet Socialist Republics Building at the New York World's Fair during the 1939 fair season. The Soviet pavilion was dismantled prior to the 1940 fair season after popular American opinion turned against the Soviet Union because of its November 1939 invasion of Finland. As part of the dismantling, "Big Joe" had been warehoused in Hoboken, New Jersey, but prevented from export by a United States Maritime Commission ruling enforcing a "moral embargo" that prohibited the charter of American ships on behalf of the Soviet Union.

== World War II ==
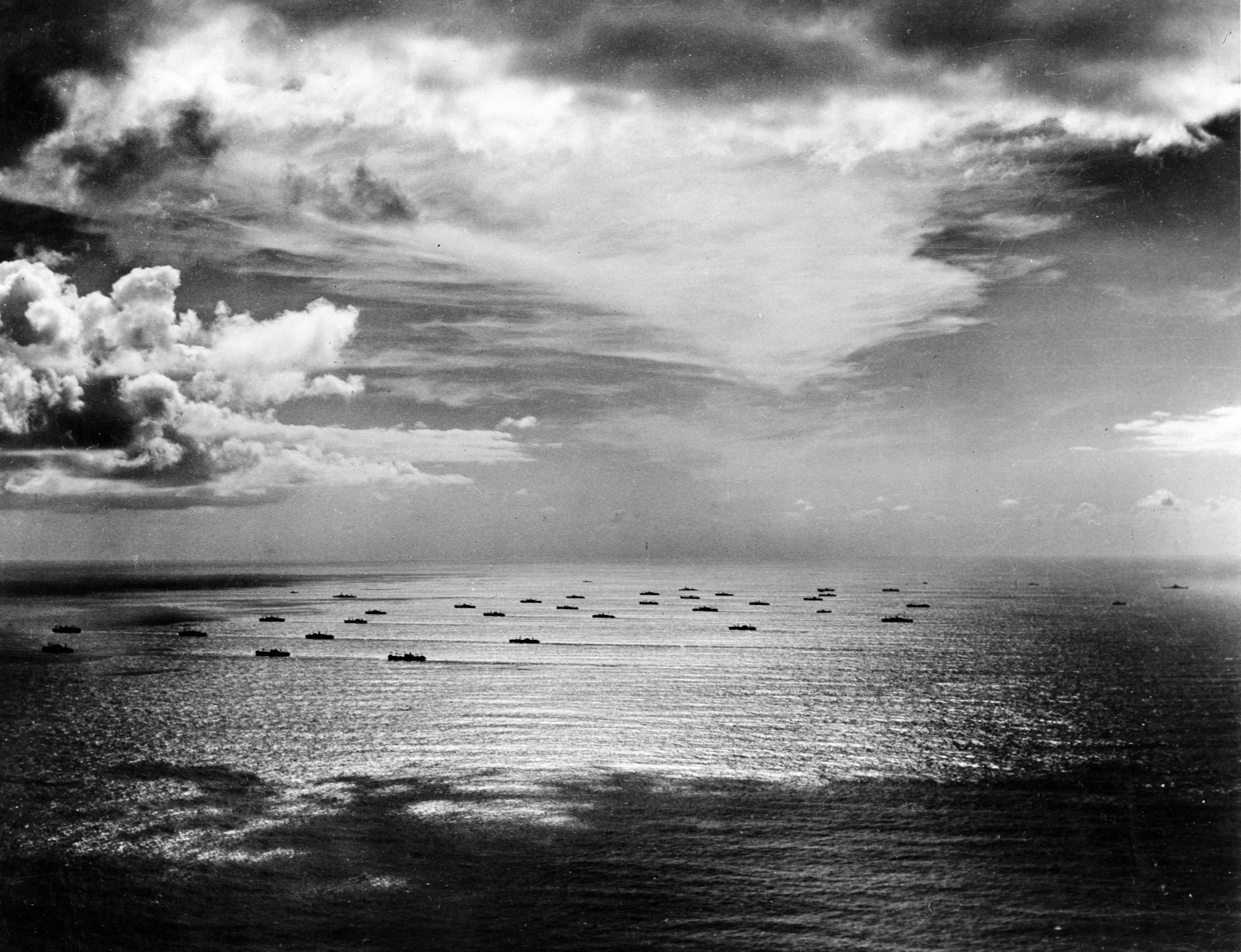
SS Pan Royal sailed in 4 transatlantic convoys like this typical one, seen in 1942.

In June 1942, seven months after the United States had entered World War II, Pan Royal made two roundtrips in transatlantic convoys between Boston and the United Kingdom via Halifax. While in the UK during her second visit, the ship had called at Belfast Lough, Barry, and Milford Haven before returning to New York in October. In mid November, Pan Royal sailed from Hampton Roads, Virginia, to Casablanca, and returned in mid-January 1943.

On 7 February 1943, Pan Royal departed Hampton Roads in Convoy UGS-5 for North Africa. Two days out, Pan Royal was accidentally rammed by both the Norwegian cargo ship Evita and the American Liberty ship George Davis. Pan Royal sank at position 36°40′N 67°20′W with the loss of eight men. Her 54 survivors were rescued by US Navy destroyer USS Boyle (DD-600).

== Bibliography ==
- Cressman, Robert (2000). "Chapter V: 1943". The Official Chronology of the U.S. Navy in World War II. Annapolis, Maryland: Naval Institute Press. ISBN 978-1-55750-149-3. OCLC 41977179.
- Crowell, Benedict; Robert Forrest Wilson (1921). The Road to France: The Transportation of Troops and Military Supplies, 1917–1918. How America Went to War: An Account From Official Sources of the Nation's War Activities, 1917–1920. New Haven: Yale University Press. OCLC 18696066.
- de la Pedraja Tomán, René (1994). "Waterman Steamship Corporation". A Historical Dictionary of the U.S. Merchant Marine and Shipping Industry: Since the Introduction of Steam. Westport, Connecticut: Greenwood Press. ISBN 978-0-313-27225-7. OCLC 29311518.
- Naval Historical Center. "West Carnifax". Dictionary of American Naval Fighting Ships. Navy Department, Naval History and Heritage Command.
- Stringer, Harry R. (1921). The Navy Book of Distinguished Service. Washington, D.C.: Fassett Pub. Co. OCLC 2654351.
- Swift, Anthony (July 1998). "The Soviet World of Tomorrow at the New York World's Fair, 1939". The Russian Review. 57 (3). Blackwell Publishing: 364–379. doi:10.1111/1467-9434.00029. OCLC 207428826.
