= SS Tristram Dalton =

Liberty ship of WWII

- Tristram Dalton, probably in Belgium

History

United States
- Name: Tristram Dalton
- Namesake: Tristram Dalton
- Owner: War Shipping Administration (WSA)
- Operator: A.H. Bull & Co., Inc.
- Port of registry: Baltimore
- Ordered: as type (EC2-S-C1) hull, MCE hull 307
- Awarded: 1 May 1941
- Builder: Bethlehem-Fairfield Shipyard, Baltimore, Maryland
- Cost: $1,071,570
- Yard number: 2057
- Way number: 14
- Laid down: 6 July 1942
- Launched: 27 August 1942
- Sponsored by: Mrs. Gerard A. McCabe
- Completed: 28 September 1942
- Identification: US official number 242166; Call sign: KHAU
- Fate: Sold for commercial use, 15 April 1947

United States
- Name: Rosario
- Owner: A.H. Bull & Co., Inc.
- Fate: Sold, December 1954

Liberia
- Name: Achileus; Andros Laurel
- Owner: Isla Colon Cia. Nav
- Operator: Orion Shipping & Trading Co.
- Fate: Sold, 1957

Liberia
- Name: Andros Laurel
- Owner: Jackson Steamship Co.
- Operator: Suwannee Steamship Co.
- Fate: Sold, 1963

Liberia
- Name: Grand Faith
- Owner: Faith Navigation Corp.
- Operator: Sea King Corp
- Fate: Scrapped, 1968

General characteristics
- Class & type: Liberty ship; type EC2-S-C1, standard
- Tonnage: 10,865 LT DWT; 7,176 GRT
- Displacement: 3,380 long tons (3,434 t) (light); 14,245 long tons (14,474 t) (max)
- Length: 441 feet 6 inches (135 m) oa; 416 feet (127 m) pp; 427 feet (130 m) lwl
- Beam: 57 feet (17 m)
- Draft: 27 ft 9.25 in (8.4646 m)
- Installed power: 2 × Oil fired 450 °F (232 °C) boilers, operating at 220 psi (1,500 kPa); 2,500 hp (1,900 kW)
- Propulsion: 1 × triple-expansion steam engine, (manufactured by Worthington Pump & Machinery Corp, Harrison, New Jersey); 1 × screw propeller
- Speed: 11.5 knots (21.3 km/h; 13.2 mph)
- Capacity: 562,608 cubic feet (15,931 m^{3}) (grain); 499,573 cubic feet (14,146 m^{3}) (bale)
- Complement: 38–62 USMM; 21–40 USNAG
- Armament: Varied by ship; Bow-mounted 3-inch (76 mm)/50-caliber gun; Stern-mounted 4-inch (102 mm)/50-caliber gun; 2–8 × single 20-millimeter (0.79 in) Oerlikon anti-aircraft (AA) cannons and/or, 2–8 × 37-millimeter (1.46 in) M1 AA guns

SS Tristram Dalton was a Liberty ship built in the United States during World War II. She was named after Tristram Dalton, an American politician and merchant from Massachusetts. He served a single term as one of the first United States senators, from 1789 to 1791.

== Construction ==
Tristram Dalton was laid down on 6 July 1942, under a Maritime Commission (MARCOM) contract, MCE hull 307, by the Bethlehem-Fairfield Shipyard, Baltimore, Maryland; she was sponsored by Mrs. Gerard A. McCabe, the wife of a yard employee, and was launched on 27 August 1942.

== History ==
She was allocated to A.H. Bull & Co., Inc., on 28 September 1942. On 15 April 1947, she was sold for commercial use to A.H. Bull & Co., Inc. She was scrapped in Taiwan, in 1968.

== Bibliography ==
- "Bethlehem-Fairfield, Baltimore MD". www.ShipbuildingHistory.com. 14 August 2008.
- Maritime Administration. "Tristram Dalton". Ship History Database Vessel Status Card. U.S. Department of Transportation, Maritime Administration.
- Davies, James (May 2004). "Specifications (As-Built)" (PDF). p. 23.
- "SS Tristram Dalton".
