= SS Thaddeus Kosciuszko =

Liberty ship of WWII

History

United States
- Name: Thaddeus Kosciuszko
- Namesake: Tadeusz Kościuszko
- Owner: War Shipping Administration (WSA)
- Operator: Grace Line Inc.
- Ordered: as type (EC2-S-C1) hull, MCE hull 926
- Awarded: 30 January 1942
- Builder: Bethlehem-Fairfield Shipyard, Baltimore, Maryland
- Cost: $1,065,258
- Yard number: 2076
- Way number: 16
- Laid down: 2 November 1942
- Launched: 28 November 1942
- Sponsored by: Mrs. George P. Welzant
- Completed: 12 December 1942
- Identification: Call sign: KJJF
- Fate: Sold, 1947, wrecked 1962

General characteristics
- Class & type: Liberty ship; type EC2-S-C1, standard
- Tonnage: 10,865 LT DWT; 7,176 GRT
- Displacement: 3,380 long tons (3,434 t) (light); 14,245 long tons (14,474 t) (max)
- Length: 441 feet 6 inches (135 m) oa; 416 feet (127 m) pp; 427 feet (130 m) lwl
- Beam: 57 feet (17 m)
- Draft: 27 ft 9.25 in (8.4646 m)
- Installed power: 2 × Oil fired 450 °F (232 °C) boilers, operating at 220 psi (1,500 kPa); 2,500 hp (1,900 kW)
- Propulsion: 1 × triple-expansion steam engine, (manufactured by Ellicott Machine Corp., Baltimore, Maryland); 1 × screw propeller
- Speed: 11.5 knots (21.3 km/h; 13.2 mph)
- Capacity: 562,608 cubic feet (15,931 m^{3}) (grain); 499,573 cubic feet (14,146 m^{3}) (bale)
- Complement: 38–62 USMM; 21–40 USNAG
- Armament: Varied by ship; Bow-mounted 3-inch (76 mm)/50-caliber gun; Stern-mounted 4-inch (102 mm)/50-caliber gun; 2–8 × single 20-millimeter (0.79 in) Oerlikon anti-aircraft (AA) cannons and/or, 2–8 × 37-millimeter (1.46 in) M1 AA guns

SS Thaddeus Kosciuszko was a Liberty ship built in the United States during World War II. She was named after Tadeusz Kościuszko, a Polish military engineer, statesman, and military leader who fought on the US side in the American Revolutionary War.

== Construction ==
Thaddeus Kosciuszko was laid down on 2 November 1942, under a Maritime Commission (MARCOM) contract, MCE hull 926, by the Bethlehem-Fairfield Shipyard, Baltimore, Maryland; she was sponsored by Mrs. George P. Welzant, and was launched on 28 November 1942.

== History ==
She was allocated to Grace Line Inc., on 15 December 1942.

On 9 April 1947, she was purchased by Baltimor Insular Line, and renamed Marina. In December 1954, she was sold and reflagged in Liberia. She was wrecked and repaired in 1956, then wrecked and abandoned in 1962.

== Bibliography ==
- "Bethlehem-Fairfield, Baltimore MD". www.ShipbuildingHistory.com. 7 August 2021.
- Maritime Administration. "Thaddeus Kosciuszko". Ship History Database Vessel Status Card. U.S. Department of Transportation, Maritime Administration.
- Davies, James (May 2004). "Specifications (As-Built)" (PDF). p. 23.
- "SS Thaddeus Kosciuszko".
