= SS Thomas Heyward =

World War II Liberty ship of the United States

- A Liberty ship at sea

History

United States
- Name: Thomas Heyward
- Namesake: Thomas Heyward, Jr.
- Builder: Alabama Drydock and Shipbuilding Company, Mobile, Alabama
- Yard number: MCE #6, Bldrs. #236
- Laid down: 21 February 1942
- Launched: 31 May 1942
- Sponsored by: Mrs. W. D. Tryon, Wife of ADDSCO Hull Foreman; Co-sponsor - Mrs. J. F. Harrell, Wife of Welding Foreman
- Completed: 31 July 1942
- Fate: Scuttled as an artificial reef, 1977

General characteristics
- Class & type: Type EC2-S-C1 Liberty ship
- Displacement: 14,245 long tons (14,474 t)
- Length: 441 ft 6 in (134.57 m) o/a; 417 ft 9 in (127.33 m) p/p; 427 ft (130 m) w/l
- Beam: 57 ft (17 m)
- Draft: 27 ft 9 in (8.46 m)
- Propulsion: Two oil-fired boilers; Triple-expansion steam engine; 2,500 hp (1,900 kW); Single screw
- Speed: 11 knots (20 km/h; 13 mph)
- Range: 20,000 nmi (37,000 km; 23,000 mi)
- Capacity: 10,856 t (10,685 long tons) deadweight (DWT)
- Crew: 81
- Armament: Stern-mounted 4 in (100 mm) deck gun; Variety of anti-aircraft guns

SS Thomas Heyward was a Liberty ship, Maritime Commission hull number 236, built by Alabama Drydock and Shipbuilding Company at Mobile, Alabama, laid down 21 February 1942, and launched 31 May 1942. It was named for Thomas Heyward, Jr. (28 July 1746 – 6 March 1809), a signer of the United States Declaration of Independence and of the Articles of Confederation as a representative of South Carolina.

She was leased to Waterman Steamship Company and delivered on 31 July 1942. On 5 May 1946, the Thomas Heyward hit an unswept floating mine off Europe. Although damaged, the vessel made it safely back to port for repairs. The vessel was placed in the Mobile Reserve Fleet in 1949, but was reactivated in 1951 for duty during the Korean War.

After final retirement, the vessel was laid up in the James River in Virginia for a time, then was purchased by the Florida Department of Natural Resources and prepared for final disposal as an artificial reef in a Pascagoula, Mississippi salvage yard with the superstructure cut down to the first deck to meet U.S. Army Corps of Engineers specifications for artificial reef structures. It was sunk on 14 April 1977 off of Destin, Florida at 30°18′22.56″N 86°36′13.32″W, four miles south of the Okaloosa Island pier just north of the Pensacola–Panama City shipping lane, in about 79 ft (24 m) of water.
