= USS Hercules (AK-41) =

Cargo ship of the United States Navy

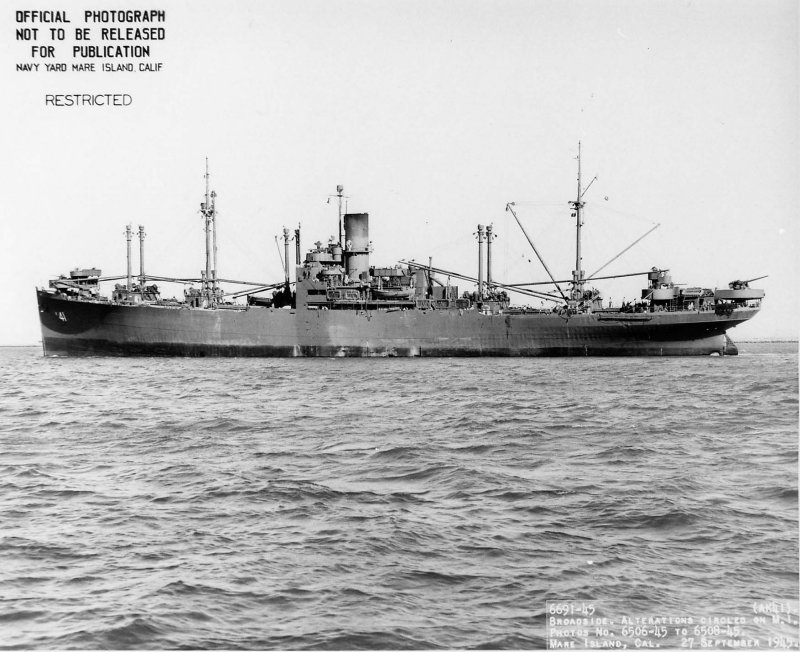

History

United States
- Ordered: as SS Exporter, (C3-E) hull
- Laid down: date unknown
- Launched: 18 July 1939
- Acquired: 15 July 1941
- Commissioned: 30 November 1942
- Decommissioned: 28 June 1946
- Stricken: date unknown
- Fate: Scrapped in 1971

General characteristics
- Displacement: 5,150 t.(lt)
- Length: 473 ft 1 in (144.20 m)
- Beam: 66 ft (20 m)
- Draught: 27 ft 2 in (8.28 m)
- Propulsion: (system type unknown), single screw
- Speed: 16 knots (30 km/h)
- Complement: 129
- Armament: one single 5 in (130 mm) dual-purpose gun mount; four single 3 in (76 mm) dual-purpose gun mounts

USS Hercules (AK-41) was a Hercules-class transport commissioned by the U.S. Navy for service in World War II. She was responsible for delivering necessary goods and equipment to ships and stations in the war zone.

Hercules (AK-41), ex-SS Exporter, was launched 18 July 1939 by the Fore River Shipbuilding Co., Quincy, Massachusetts, for American Export Lines Inc. Acquired by the Navy 15 July 1941, she continued to be operated by civilian crews until 30 November 1942, when she commissioned at San Francisco, California.

== World War II Pacific Theatre operations ==
Departing San Francisco 18 December, Hercules reached Noumea, New Caledonia, 6 January 1943 to discharge her cargo. She returned to San Francisco 20 February and repeated the voyage from 11 March to 5 July. Hercules sailed for Pearl Harbor 6 August and reached Hawaii 6 days later. As flagship for Admiral Willis A. Lee, CTF 11, she sailed for action 25 August and on 1 September was off Baker Island as the Army began occupation. Remaining off Baker Island until 16 September discharging cargo, Hercules returned to Pearl Harbor and from there sailed for San Francisco.

== Supporting Allied invasion forces ==
Taking on passengers and cargo, she sailed again for the Pacific war areas 13 October, reaching Funafuti, Ellice Islands, 14 November after discharging cargo at Pearl Harbor. After miscellaneous cargo trips in the southern Pacific, Hercules returned to Pearl 28 January 1944 for repairs. Two round-trips with cargo and passengers to San Francisco brought her into the summer and on 30 May she sailed with the initial invasion force for Saipan. Hercules reached Saipan 15 June, D-Day, and remained there discharging cargo until 24 June. Although Japanese planes filled the air and attacked her several times, Hercules emerged unscathed as American forces continued to sweep across the island to Japan. Departing Saipan 24 June, she returned to Pearl Harbor and from there sailed to Guadalcanal.

== Supporting the Philippine invasion forces ==
Hercules sailed from Guadalcanal 8 September to participate in the invasion of Peleliu, Palau Islands, 15 September. After this hard fought operation she continued on to Hollandia, New Guinea, discharged her cargo, and 13 October sailed for the Philippines. Hercules remained in the Philippines, with several trips back for supplies, for both the initial invasion of San Pedro Bay 20 October and the landings on Lingayen Gulf 9 January 1945, as American forces returned victorious to the Philippines.

== Supporting Iwo Jima operations ==
Reaching Ulithi 24 January 1945, Hercules embarked troops with cargo and 17 February sailed for Iwo Jima. The invasion of that rugged island began 2 days later, and Hercules steamed in the retirement area until 27 February when she disembarked reserve troops on the beach and received wounded. After discharging her cargo, she remained in the Iwo Jima area until 20 March when, loaded with U.S. Marines and their equipment, she sailed for Pearl Harbor. Reaching Pearl 4 April, Hercules carried cargo to Guam and Eniwetok before reaching San Francisco 22 June for a much-needed overhaul.

== End-of-war operations ==
The war in the Pacific ended while Hercules was still undergoing repairs, but she sailed west again 24 October 1945. Loading ammunition in the Philippines and the Admiralty Islands, she transited the Panama Canal 16 March 1946 and docked at Norfolk, Virginia, 26 March. After a brief trip up the coast to New York and New Jersey, Hercules sailed to Norfolk 18 May and hauled down her commissioning pennant 28 June 1946. Hercules was transferred to the Maritime Commission 18 July. Returning to merchant service, she was renamed SS Exermont, and later SS Bostonian.

== Military awards and honors ==
Hercules received five battle stars for World War II service:

- Marianas operation
- Western Caroline Islands operation
- Leyte operation
- Luzon operations
- Iwo Jima operation

Hercules’ crew members were eligible for the following medals:

- American Campaign Medal
- Asiatic-Pacific Campaign Medal (5)
- World War II Victory Medal
- Philippines Liberation Medal (2)
