= SS Theodore Foster =

Liberty ship of WWII

History

United States
- Name: Theodore Foster
- Namesake: Theodore Foster
- Owner: War Shipping Administration (WSA)
- Operator: Shepard Steamship Company
- Ordered: as type (EC2-S-C1) hull, MCE hull 43
- Awarded: 14 March 1941
- Builder: Bethlehem-Fairfield Shipyard, Baltimore, Maryland
- Cost: $1,049,905
- Yard number: 2030
- Way number: 11
- Laid down: 31 March 1942
- Launched: 14 June 1942
- Sponsored by: Miss Barbara W. Vickery
- Completed: 29 June 1942
- Identification: Call sign: KFPV
- Fate: Laid up in the Hudson River Reserve Fleet, Jones Point, New York, 9 August 1949; Sold for scrapping, 24 March 1970, withdrawn from fleet, 26 June 1970

General characteristics
- Class & type: Liberty ship; type EC2-S-C1, standard
- Tonnage: 10,865 LT DWT; 7,176 GRT
- Displacement: 3,380 long tons (3,434 t) (light); 14,245 long tons (14,474 t) (max)
- Length: 441 feet 6 inches (135 m) oa; 416 feet (127 m) pp; 427 feet (130 m) lwl
- Beam: 57 feet (17 m)
- Draft: 27 ft 9.25 in (8.4646 m)
- Installed power: 2 × Oil fired 450 °F (232 °C) boilers, operating at 220 psi (1,500 kPa); 2,500 hp (1,900 kW)
- Propulsion: 1 × triple-expansion steam engine, (manufactured by Worthington Pump & Machinery Corp, Harrison, New Jersey); 1 × screw propeller
- Speed: 11.5 knots (21.3 km/h; 13.2 mph)
- Capacity: 562,608 cubic feet (15,931 m^{3}) (grain); 499,573 cubic feet (14,146 m^{3}) (bale)
- Complement: 38–62 USMM; 21–40 USNAG
- Armament: Varied by ship; Bow-mounted 3-inch (76 mm)/50-caliber gun; Stern-mounted 4-inch (102 mm)/50-caliber gun; 2–8 × single 20-millimeter (0.79 in) Oerlikon anti-aircraft (AA) cannons and/or, 2–8 × 37-millimeter (1.46 in) M1 AA guns

SS Theodore Foster was a Liberty ship built in the United States during World War II. She was named after Theodore Foster, an American lawyer and politician from Rhode Island. He was a member of the Federalist Party and later the National Republican Party. He served as one of the first two United States senators from Rhode Island and served as Dean of the United States Senate.

== Construction ==
Theodore Foster was laid down on 31 March 1942, under a Maritime Commission (MARCOM) contract, MCE hull 43, by the Bethlehem-Fairfield Shipyard, Baltimore, Maryland; she was sponsored by Miss Barbara W. Vickery, the daughter of Vice Admiral Howard L. Vickery, and was launched on 14 June 1942.

== History ==
Theodore Foster was allocated to Shepard Steamship Company, on 29 June 1942. On 9 August 1949, she was laid up in the Hudson River Reserve Fleet, Jones Point, New York. On 12 August 1953, she was withdrawn from the fleet to be loaded with grain under the "Grain Program 1953", she returned loaded on 24 August 1953. On 5 March 1956, Theodore Foster was withdrawn to be unload, she then returned empty 22 March 1956. On 24 July 1956, she was withdrawn from the fleet to be loaded with grain under the "Grain Program 1956", after which she returned loaded on 8 August 1956. On 17 June 1963, Theodore Foster was withdrawn to be unload, she returned empty 20 June 1963. She was sold for scrapping on 24 March 1970, to Hierros Ardes, SA., for $105,700. She was removed from the fleet, 26 June 1970.

== Bibliography ==
- "Bethlehem-Fairfield, Baltimore MD". www.ShipbuildingHistory.com. 14 August 2008.
- Maritime Administration. "Theodore Foster". Ship History Database Vessel Status Card. U.S. Department of Transportation, Maritime Administration.
- Davies, James (May 2004). "Specifications (As-Built)" (PDF). p. 23.
- "SS Theodore Foster".
