= SS Thomas J. Lyons =

Liberty ship of WWII

History

United States
- Name: Thomas J. Lyons
- Namesake: Thomas J. Lyons
- Owner: War Shipping Administration (WSA)
- Operator: Smith & Johnson Co.
- Ordered: as type (EC2-S-C1) hull, MC hull 2478
- Awarded: 23 April 1943
- Builder: St. Johns River Shipbuilding Company, Jacksonville, Florida
- Cost: $1,048,609
- Yard number: 42
- Way number: 6
- Laid down: 7 April 1944
- Launched: 18 May 1944
- Sponsored by: Mrs. Thomas J. Lyons
- Completed: 2 June 1944
- Identification: Call sign: WMYI
- Fate: Laid up in the, National Defense Reserve Fleet, Astoria, Oregon, 24 December 1948; Sold for scrapping, 10 October 1963, removed from fleet, 15 November 1963

General characteristics
- Class & type: Liberty ship; type EC2-S-C1, standard
- Tonnage: 10,865 LT DWT; 7,176 GRT
- Displacement: 3,380 long tons (3,434 t) (light); 14,245 long tons (14,474 t) (max)
- Length: 441 feet 6 inches (135 m) oa; 416 feet (127 m) pp; 427 feet (130 m) lwl
- Beam: 57 feet (17 m)
- Draft: 27 ft 9.25 in (8.4646 m)
- Installed power: 2 × Oil fired 450 °F (232 °C) boilers, operating at 220 psi (1,500 kPa); 2,500 hp (1,900 kW)
- Propulsion: 1 × triple-expansion steam engine, (manufactured by General Machinery Corp., Hamilton, Ohio); 1 × screw propeller
- Speed: 11.5 knots (21.3 km/h; 13.2 mph)
- Capacity: 562,608 cubic feet (15,931 m^{3}) (grain); 499,573 cubic feet (14,146 m^{3}) (bale)
- Complement: 38–62 USMM; 21–40 USNAG
- Armament: Varied by ship; Bow-mounted 3-inch (76 mm)/50-caliber gun; Stern-mounted 4-inch (102 mm)/50-caliber gun; 2–8 × single 20-millimeter (0.79 in) Oerlikon anti-aircraft (AA) cannons and/or, 2–8 × 37-millimeter (1.46 in) M1 AA guns

SS Thomas J. Lyons was a Liberty ship built in the United States during World War II. She was named after Thomas J. Lyons.

== Construction ==
Thomas J. Lyons was laid down on 7 April 1944, under a Maritime Commission (MARCOM) contract, MC hull 2478, by the St. Johns River Shipbuilding Company, Jacksonville, Florida; she was sponsored by Mrs. Thomas J. Lyons, the widow of the namesake, and was launched on 18 May 1944.

== History ==
She was allocated to the Smith & Johnson Co., on 2 June 1944. On 24 December 1948, she was laid up in the National Defense Reserve Fleet, Astoria, Oregon. On 2 August 1954, she was withdrawn from the fleet to be loaded with grain under the "Grain Program 1954", she returned loaded on 12 August 1954. On 21 November 1957, she was withdrawn to be unload, she returned on empty 26 November 1957. She was sold for scrapping, 10 October 1963, to Zidell Explorations, Inc., for $45,000. She was removed from the fleet on 15 November 1963.

== Bibliography ==
- "St. John's River Shipbuilding, Jacksonville FL". www.ShipbuildingHistory.com. 16 October 2010.
- Maritime Administration. "Thomas J. Lyons". Ship History Database Vessel Status Card. U.S. Department of Transportation, Maritime Administration.
- Davies, James (May 2004). "Specifications (As-Built)" (PDF). p. 23.
- "SS Thomas J. Lyons".
