= SS Thomas L. Haley =

Liberty ship of WWII

History

United States
- Name: Thomas L. Haley
- Namesake: Thomas L. Haley
- Owner: War Shipping Administration (WSA)
- Ordered: as type (EC2-S-C1) hull, MC hull 2518
- Awarded: 23 April 1943
- Builder: St. Johns River Shipbuilding Company, Jacksonville, Florida
- Cost: $1,507,429
- Yard number: 82
- Way number: 6
- Laid down: 8 January 1945
- Launched: 12 February 1945
- Sponsored by: Mrs. Stanley Erwin
- Completed: 24 February 1945
- Fate: Transferred to Greece, 24 February 1945

Greece
- Name: Spetsae
- Owner: Greece
- Fate: Sold for commercial use, 17 January 1947

Greece
- Name: Captain K. Papazoglou
- Owner: Stavros S. Niarchos (1947); N. Coumantaros (1947-1949); Stavros S. Niarchos (1949-1954)
- Operator: Union Maritime & Shipping Co. (1948-1949); Simpson, Spence & Young (1949-1952); North American Shipping & Trading Co. (1952-1954)
- Fate: Sold, 1954

Greece
- Name: Pantanassa
- Owner: Efploia Shipping Corp.
- Operator: G. Lemos Bros.
- Fate: Sold, 1961

Lebanon
- Name: Giorgos Tsakiroglou
- Owner: Eftychia Cia. Nav. (1961-1964); Efthia Cia. Nav. (1964-1969)
- Operator: Franco Shipping Co. (1961-1964); Carapanayoti & Co. (1964-1968); Shipping & Produce Co. (1968-1969)
- Fate: Scrapped, 1969

General characteristics
- Class & type: Liberty ship; type EC2-S-C1, standard
- Tonnage: 10,865 LT DWT; 7,176 GRT
- Displacement: 3,380 long tons (3,434 t) (light); 14,245 long tons (14,474 t) (max)
- Length: 441 feet 6 inches (135 m) oa; 416 feet (127 m) pp; 427 feet (130 m) lwl
- Beam: 57 feet (17 m)
- Draft: 27 ft 9.25 in (8.4646 m)
- Installed power: 2 × Oil fired 450 °F (232 °C) boilers, operating at 220 psi (1,500 kPa); 2,500 hp (1,900 kW)
- Propulsion: 1 × triple-expansion steam engine, (manufactured by General Machinery Corp., Hamilton, Ohio); 1 × screw propeller
- Speed: 11.5 knots (21.3 km/h; 13.2 mph)
- Capacity: 562,608 cubic feet (15,931 m^{3}) (grain); 499,573 cubic feet (14,146 m^{3}) (bale)
- Complement: 38–62 USMM; 21–40 USNAG
- Armament: Varied by ship; Bow-mounted 3-inch (76 mm)/50-caliber gun; Stern-mounted 4-inch (102 mm)/50-caliber gun; 2–8 × single 20-millimeter (0.79 in) Oerlikon anti-aircraft (AA) cannons and/or, 2–8 × 37-millimeter (1.46 in) M1 AA guns

SS Thomas L. Haley was a Liberty ship built in the United States during World War II. She was named after Thomas L. Haley, a Merchant seaman killed on the Liberty ship SS Julia Ward Howe, 27 January 1943, when she was struck by a torpedo from German submarine U-442.

== Construction ==
Thomas L. Haley was laid down on 8 January 1945, under a Maritime Commission (MARCOM) contract, MC hull 2518, by the St. Johns River Shipbuilding Company, Jacksonville, Florida; she was sponsored by Mrs. Stanley Erwin, the wife of a prominent Jacksonville physician, and she was launched on 12 February 1945.

== History ==
She was transferred to Greece, under the Lend-Lease program, on 24 February 1945. She was sold for commercial use, 17 January 1947, to Stavros S. Niarchos, for $576,758.66.

== Bibliography ==
- "St. John's River Shipbuilding, Jacksonville FL". www.ShipbuildingHistory.com. 16 October 2010.
- Maritime Administration. "Thomas L. Haley". Ship History Database Vessel Status Card. U.S. Department of Transportation, Maritime Administration.
- Davies, James (May 2004). "Specifications (As-Built)" (PDF). p. 23.
- "SS Thomas L. Haley".
- "SS Julia Ward Howe". www.Uboat.net.
