= Salem First United Methodist Church =

Historic church in Oregon, United States

- First Methodist Episcopal Church of Salem
- U.S. National Register of Historic Places
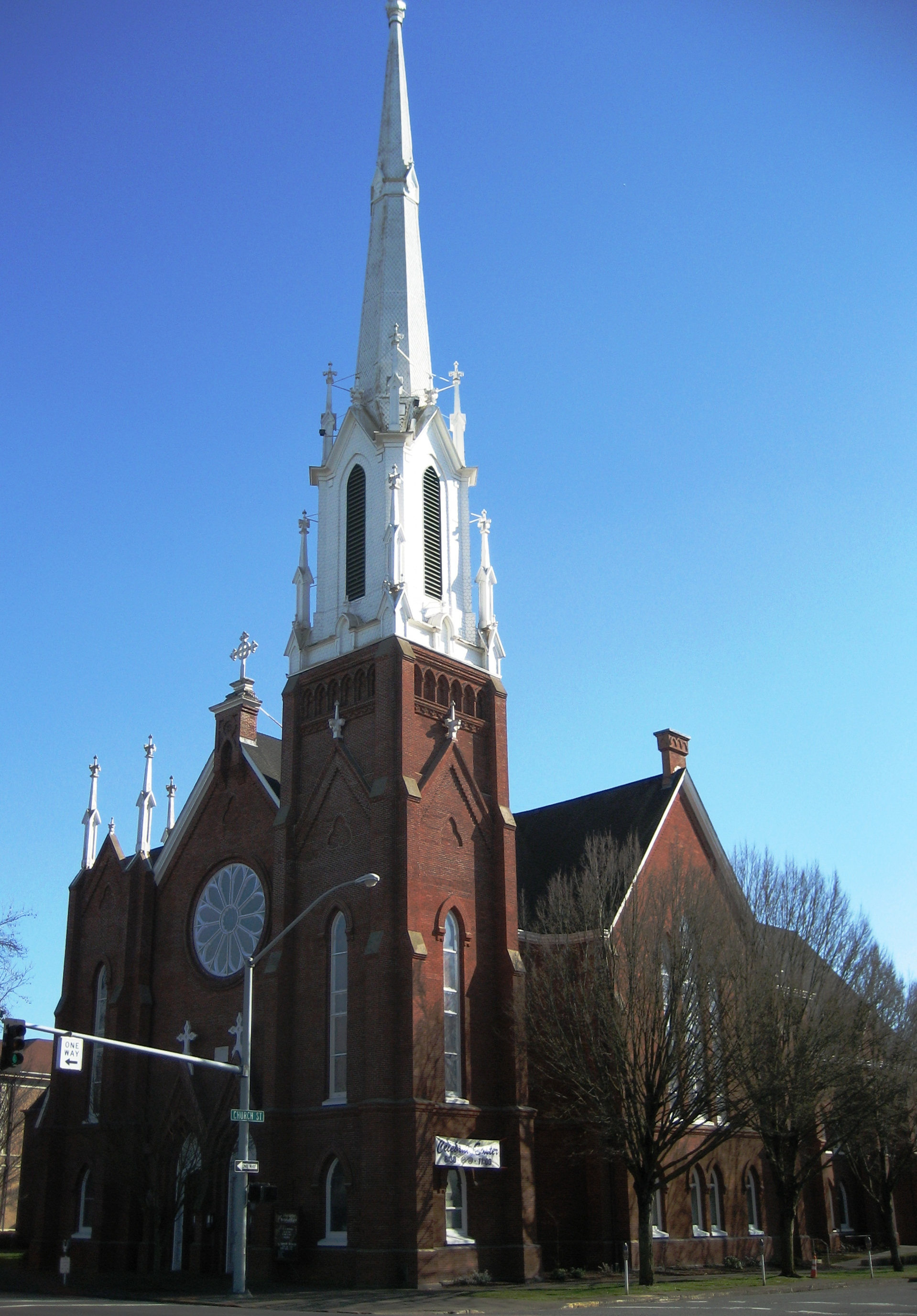
- Location: 600 State Street; Salem, Oregon
- Coordinates: 44°56′20″N 123°02′08″W
- Built: 1871–1878
- Architect: Cass Chapman; Wilbur F. Boothby
- Architectural style: Late Gothic Revival
- NRHP reference No.: 83002162
- Added to NRHP: May 9, 1983

Salem First United Methodist Church is a Methodist congregation and historic church in Salem, Oregon, United States. The church was listed on the National Register of Historic Places under its original name, First Methodist Episcopal Church of Salem, in 1983. First United is the oldest Methodist church west of the Rocky Mountains, and is a designated United Methodist Heritage Landmark. It is one of Oregon's few high-style Gothic Revival churches outside of Portland, and has one of the rare tall spires left standing in the state.

== History ==
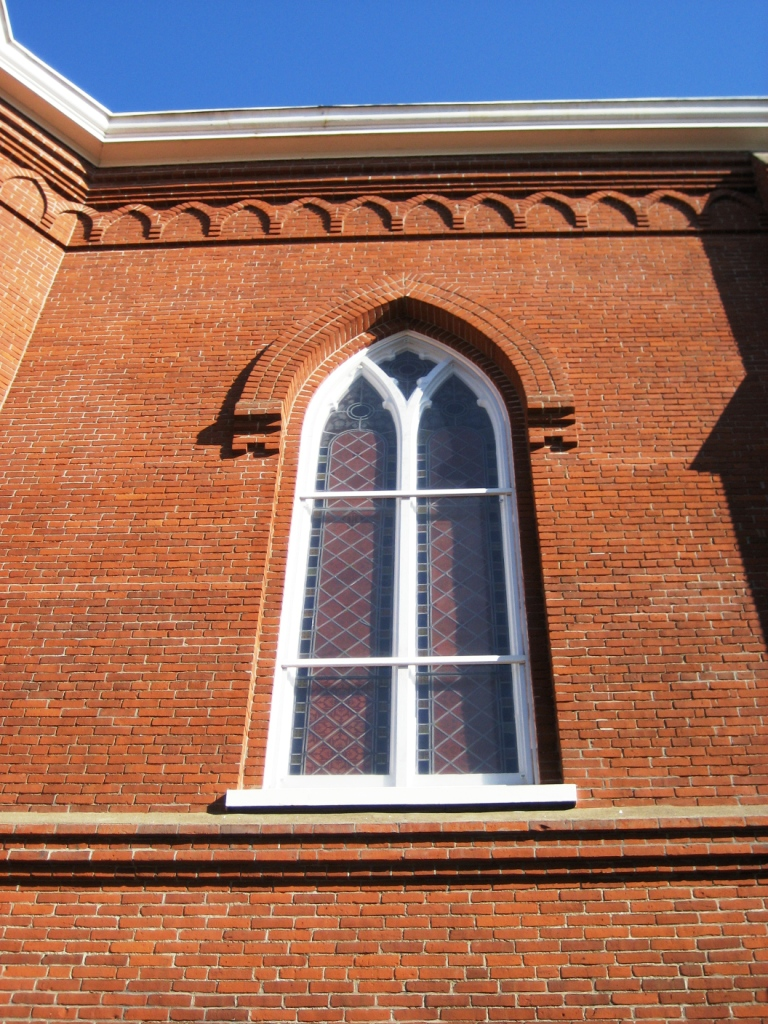
Gothic window detail showing brick hood molding

The Methodist Episcopal Church of Salem was established in 1841 when the Methodist Mission moved its headquarters to Salem. Jason Lee was one of the 13 charter members of the church, and David Leslie was the first pastor. Initially the church met in a room at the Oregon Institute. After about 10 years, the congregation grew, and in 1853 they were able to build a small wooden frame building at the southeast corner of Church and State streets. By 1870, the congregation had outgrown this building and they began construction of the current sanctuary building at the same location. The brick Gothic Revival-style church was completed in 1878, despite a national depression and other difficulties. Cass Chapman, a Chicago architect who designed a number of buildings at Cornell College, supplied the plans, which were reduced in scale by one-eighth in order to lower building costs. Local architect Wilbur F. Boothby supervised the construction.

Additions to the building in 1935 and 1967 were designed to harmonize with the original building's Gothic style. The original 185-foot wooden spire, which makes the church the tallest building in Salem, was replaced in 1984. The sanctuary was remodeled in 1953 to add an Aeolian-Skinner pipe organ, a chancel rose window, new altar, pulpit, and pews. Additional renovations to the interior occurred in 1981 and 1988. In 2000, the organ acquired its full rank of pipes.

First United purchased the historic Salem Elks building adjacent to the church in 1992 and renamed it MICAH (Methodist Inner-city Community Activities House). The building houses a youth center, the United Methodist Archives for the Oregon-Idaho Conference, an area for informal worship services, and several community outreach organizations.

== See also ==
- Methodist Episcopal Church
