= William H. Willson =

American politician

Treasurer for the Provisional Government of Oregon
- In office July 5, 1843 – May 14, 1844
- Succeeded by: Philip Foster
- Constituency: Oregon Country

Personal details
- Born: April 14, 1805 New Hampshire
- Died: April 17, 1856 (aged 51) Salem, Oregon
- Spouse: Chloe Aurelia Clark
- Relations: Joseph K. Gill
- Children: 3
- Occupation: Carpenter

William Holden Willson (April 14, 1805 – April 17, 1856) was a pioneer of the U.S. state of Oregon and the founder of its capital city, Salem. A native of New Hampshire, he immigrated to the Oregon Country in 1837 to work at the Methodist Mission, and there would participate in the Champoeg Meetings. Willson served as the first treasurer of the Provisional Government of Oregon.

== Early life ==
William Willson was born on April 14, 1805, in the state of New Hampshire. On the East Coast of the United States he worked as a whaler, a cooper, and as a carpenter on a ship. Willson was recruited to work at the Methodist Mission founded by the Reverend Jason Lee in the Willamette Valley as a layperson. He traveled by ship on the brig Diana, where he was instructed informally in medical training by Dr. Elijah White during the voyage.

== Oregon ==
On May 18, 1837, Willson and other recruits for the Methodist Mission arrived in what was known as the Oregon Country, a region whose control was under dispute primarily between Great Britain and the United States. At the mission, he worked as a lay worker as a doctor and carpenter, and was also sent with David Leslie to establish the Nisqually Mission by Fort Nisqually near the Puget Sound. Willson returned to the Willamette Valley in 1839 and claimed land at the site of present-day Salem. Willson married fellow missionary Chloe Clark, who became the first teacher at the Oregon Institute in 1844. They had three children. Willson gave land to the Oregon Institute in 1846. He platted and named Salem that year, choosing the name because it means "City of Peace", and donated some land to serve as a park.

== Political career ==
While Willson was in the region, settlers began to look at establishing a government in the unorganized area. These led to the holding of several meetings in 1841 and again in 1843. During the May 2, 1843, Champoeg Meeting, Willson served as secretary, and voted in favor of creating a provisional government, which passed with a 52-50 vote. He was also elected as the first treasurer of the new Provisional Government of Oregon at the election that adopted the Organic Laws of Oregon and served from July 5, 1843 to May 14, 1844. In 1844, he was wounded in the Cockstock Incident. In 1845, he was elected as the president of the bench in the Champoeg District. During the Cayuse War of 1847 to 1850 he was appointed to the commission that worked to raise the money to fight the war that was born out of the Whitman Massacre. Willson participated in the Oregon Exchange Company in 1849 that minted the Beaver Coins prior to the arrival of U.S. authority in the region. He ran for territorial delegate to Congress in 1851, but lost to Joseph Lane.

== Later years ==
In 1853, Willson served as a member of the board of trustees at Willamette University, which was the new name of the Oregon Institute. The following year he served as a commissioner for the proposed and later built Oregon and California Railroad. William Holden Willson died in Salem on April 17, 1856, at the age of 51 and was interred in Salem Pioneer Cemetery. Willson owned a bookstore in Salem at one time, and when his daughter Frances married Joseph K. Gill in 1866, Gill took over the store. The land he donated for a park in Salem is located next to the Oregon State Capitol and was named Willson Park in his honor.

== See also ==
- Margaret Jewett Smith Bailey
