= Chloe Clark Willson =

American Methodist missionary and pioneer

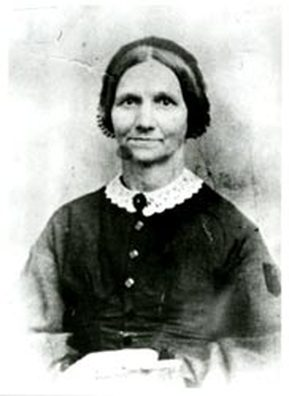
Chloe Clark Willson

Chloe Aurelia Clark Willson (April 16, 1818 – June 2, 1874) was an early pioneer of what became the U.S. state of Oregon, and one of the first teachers of the Methodist mission in the Willamette Valley. In 1850, she owned half of the land in Oregon's state capital Salem.

== Life ==
Chloe Aurelia Clark (sometimes spelled Clarke) was born on April 16, 1818, in East Windsor, Connecticut. She was educated at the Wilbraham Academy. At the age of 21, she sailed from New York on the ship Lausanne in what was known as Jason Lee's "Great Reinforcement" of recruits for the Methodist Mission in Salem, Oregon.

She married William H. Willson, credited as the founder of Salem, Oregon, on August 16, 1840, at the Nisqually Mission. It was the first wedding of American citizens in western Washington. The two had three daughters: Frances, Laurabelle, and Kate Augusta Lee.

Chloe Willson was the first teacher of the Oregon Institute, which was founded after the failure of the Indian Manual Training School. When the Institute opened, Willson was the only teacher, as well as housemother for five white students, the children of settlers. She remained the sole teacher for two years.

The board of the Institute decided to lay out a town on the school's land, with the intent to sell lots to fund the school, and attract settlers to the area. The 1846 decision named Dr. William H. Willson as the business agent and landholder for the town he named Salem. When the Donation Land Claim Law of 1850 passed, it meant the 640 acres (260 ha) held by Willson belonged jointly to him and Chloe. He was bound to the Oregon Institute's board to administer the land, but Chloe was not, leading to controversy which was settled in 1854 with a compromise: the property was split in half along State Street, with the 320 acres (130 ha) South of the street belonging to the institute (later Willamette University), and the 320 acres (130 ha) North belonging to Chloe. This northern land would eventually be home to the Oregon State Capitol.

William H. Willson died in 1856, prompting Chloe to move back east for her daughters' schooling. She returned to Salem in 1863 to serve as the Governess of the Ladies Department at Willamette University.

Willson may be best known for her diary, which chronicled her journey to Oregon on the ship Lausanne and her life as a missionary teacher, as well as her later life, and is a valuable resource for historians. In 1935, the diary was donated to Willamette University (the successor to the Oregon Institute) by her son-in-law Joseph K. Gill.

== Legacy ==
Chloe Clark Elementary School in DuPont, Washington, is named for her, and a statue of her is on its campus.

== See also ==
- Margaret Jewett Smith Bailey
- Lausanne Hall
