= Joseph K. Gill =

American businessman (1841–1931)

Joseph Kaye Gill
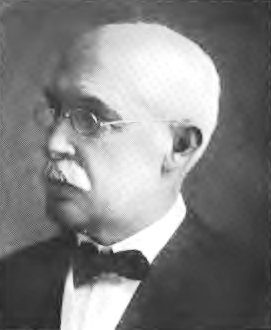
- Gill circa 1911
- Born: August 13, 1841; Huddersfield, Yorkshire, England
- Died: October 1, 1931 (aged 90); Portland, Oregon, U.S.
- Education: Wilbraham Wesleyan Academy
- Occupation: Retailer
- Spouse: Frances A. Willson

Joseph Kaye "J.K." Gill (August 13, 1841 – October 1, 1931) was an English-born American retailer and publisher in the state of Oregon. A native of England, he came to the United States with his parents and settled in Oregon where he managed a bookstore in Salem. Later he entered the business and became the owner of the now-defunct J. K. Gill Company that operated in the Pacific Northwest as a book and office supply store.

== Early years ==
Joseph Kaye Gill was born in Yorkshire, England, in 1841 to Mark and Amelia Gill. He was the oldest of their eleven children. In 1854, he emigrated to the United States with his parents. The family first settled in Massachusetts where he received his education in the schools of Worcester before enrolling at Wilbraham Wesleyan Academy in Wilbraham at the age of eighteen.

In 1864, he sailed to Oregon where he enrolled at Willamette University in Salem in an effort to improve his eyesight by moving west. He had boarded with the wife of Salem founder William H. Willson while attending Wesleyan. Gill also taught at Willamette's preparatory department while he attended the college. In 1865, he returned to Wesleyan Academy where he graduated in June 1866.

== Oregon ==
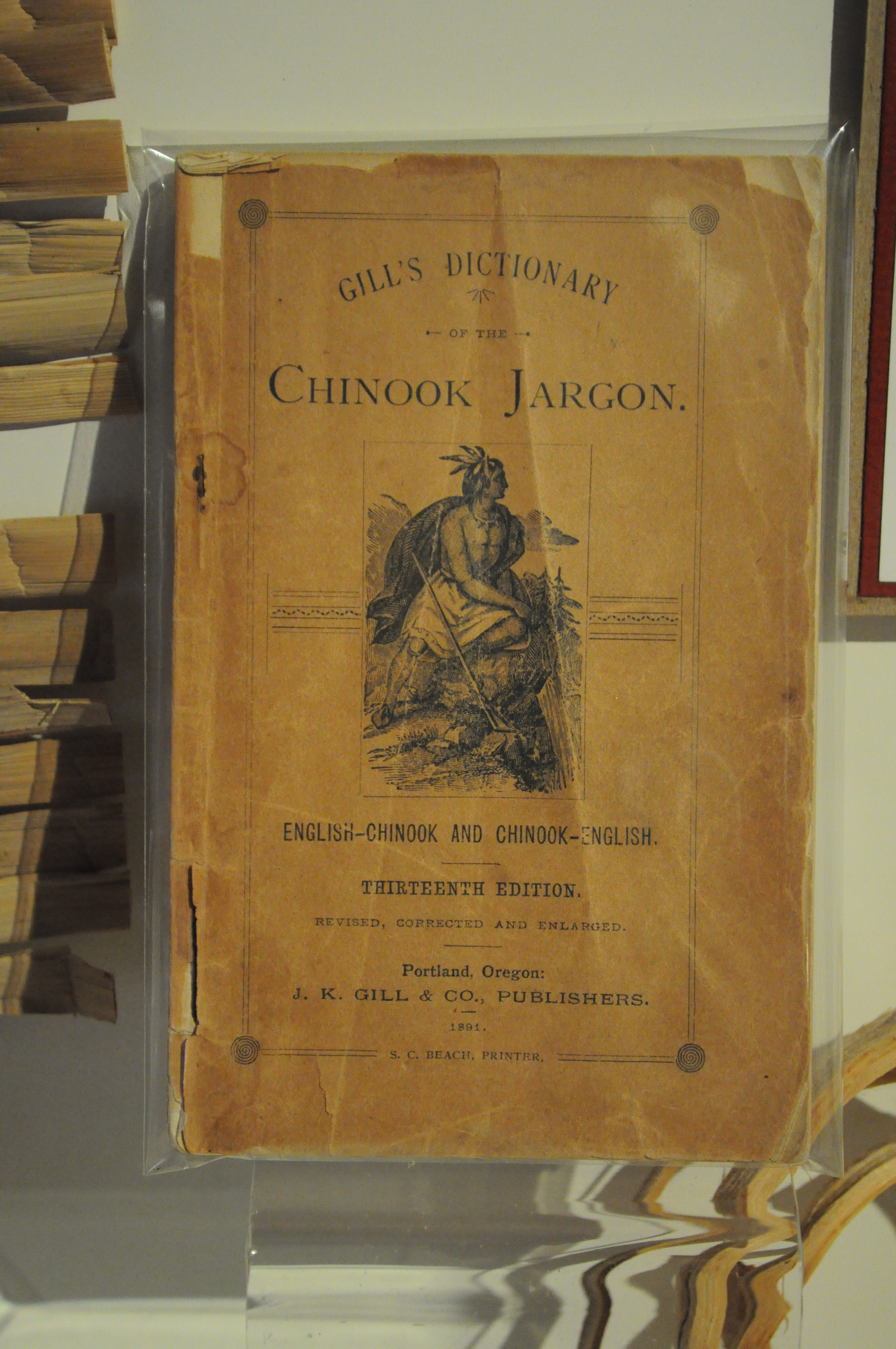
Cover, J. K. Gill Company's Dictionary of the Chinook Jargon, 13th Edition, 1891. Photographed at Log House Museum, Seattle, Washington.

Gill returned to Oregon in 1866 where he was married in August to Frances A. Willson. She was the daughter of William H. and Chloe Willson, and Gill took over operating the bookstore formerly owned by Willson at 356 State Street. The couple would have six children, five daughters and one son, Mark. After a short time he purchased the business, but sold it in 1870. Gill then moved to Portland where he opened a new bookstore with George A. Steel that same year. He gained sole control of the business in 1878 when Steel retired, and then named it J. K. Gill Company, later taking in his brother John as a partner. In 1884, he founded the Columbia River Paper company with William Lewthwaite and Henry Pittock, with Gill serving as president. He also helped found Merchants National Bank and served on the boards of several local insurance companies.

== Later years ==
In Portland, Gill lived in a mansion on the affluent northwest Nineteenth Street. A Methodist, he was the president of his church's trustee board. In the 1890s he climbed Mount Hood. The flagship Portland store of Gill's book business moved into a new ten-story building in 1921. In civic affairs he was Republican and member of the Club Commercial Society. Joseph Kaye Gill died on October 1, 1931, at the age of 90. The company would grow to almost 40 stores in the mid-1980s, located in Oregon, Washington, California and Arizona before a long decline due to increased competition from stores such as Office Depot. In January 1999, the final seven stores of the office supply, book, stationery, and art supply retailer were closed.
