= Margaret Jewett Bailey =

American poet

- Born: Margaret Jewett Smith c. 1812; Saugus, Massachusetts, U.S.
- Died: May 17, 1882 (aged 69–70); Seattle, Washington, U.S.
- Other names: Ruth Rover
- Occupations: Pioneer; missionary; author
- Notable work: The Grains
- Spouse(s): William J. Bailey (m. 1839-1854; divorced); Francis Waddle (1855-1858; divorced); Mr. Crane (18??)

Margaret Jewett Bailey (née Smith; later Waddle and Crane; c. 1812 – 1882) was an American pioneer, missionary, and author from Oregon.

Bailey, using the pen name Ruth Rover, wrote one of the earliest literary works published in Oregon, The Grains, or, Passages in the Life of Ruth Rover, with Occasional Pictures of Oregon, Natural and Moral. According to historian Edwin Bingham in the foreword to the 1986 edition, Grains is "part autobiography, part religious testimonial, part history and travelogue", but "by stretching the definition, The Grains may be called a novel, the first novel written and published on the Pacific coast."

== Early life ==
Margaret Jewett Smith was born in Saugus, Massachusetts in or around 1812. She converted to Methodism when she was 17 at a camp meeting. She attended the Methodist Episcopal Wesleyan Academy in Wilbraham over the objections of her family, especially her father, who wished for her to care for him in his old age and who threatened to disown her. She hoped she could become a missionary teacher among the Native Americans.

== Move to Oregon Country ==
Smith came to the Oregon Country to join the Methodist Mission in September 1837 with the Reverend David Leslie, his wife Mary, their children, and the Reverend H. K. W. Perkins. Smith, who worked as a teacher, was the only unmarried white woman at the mission, thus the mission authorities pressured her to marry.

She was courted by William H. Willson and was engaged to him for a time, but she refused to marry him after learning he had also written to another woman, Chloe Clark, asking her to come to Oregon to become his wife. Smith insisted on waiting to marry Willson until it was known if the other woman was coming to Oregon. Willson became impatient and asked Smith to falsely confess that they had fornicated so that they would be allowed to marry immediately. Smith refused, but Willson told the other members of the mission that they had sinned together. Smith, unable to prove her innocence, left the mission.

In 1839, Smith married William J. Bailey, an early pioneer and later politician who did not belong to the mission. Willson married Chloe Aurelia Clark the following year. Smith lived with Bailey on their farm in French Prairie and became a regular contributor of prose and poetry to the Oregon Spectator beginning in 1846. On April 12, 1854, Margaret divorced Bailey due to his drinking and abuse.

== The Grains ==
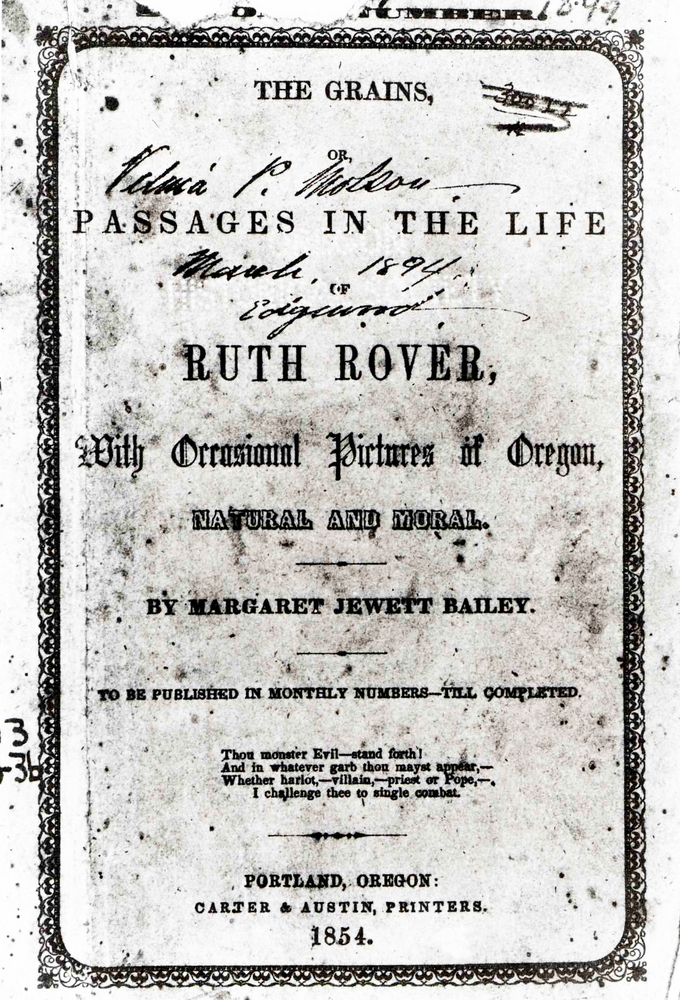
The title page of The Grains

In order to tell her side of the story about her association with the Methodist mission and her divorce from William Bailey, Margaret Bailey wrote The Grains in an attempt to clear her name. According to Bailey, as she writes in the first chapter of Grains, "I am avoided and shunned, and slighted, and regarded with suspicions in every place till my life is more burdensome than death would be."

The Grains was intended to be published in monthly installments, but only two volumes were issued, in August and September 1854 by Carter & Austin in Portland, Oregon. Bailey was already known to some Oregon readers by the time The Grains was published because of her work in the Spectator (signed "MJB"), and her letters home that were printed in Boston- and New York-based Christian newspapers as early as 1838. Bailey became the first local poet to be published west of the Rocky Mountains when her poem "Love" appeared in the first issue of the Spectator on February 5, 1846. After her divorce, Bailey edited six columns of the "Ladies Department" for the Spectator from May to June 1854. In her first column, Bailey expressed her desire to publish a paper exclusively for women. She did not publish any writing after Grains, however.

The Grains, published two years before Harriet Beecher Stowe's Uncle Tom's Cabin, is like that work a social protest, which criticizes Jason Lee and the mission community, as well as the mission's failure to convert the local Native Americans, and discrimination against women. According to the editors of the 1986 edition, Bailey's account of the facts of her life with the mission is accurate, although her interpretation of the events was sometimes biased. For example, she attributed the many misfortunes that befell David Leslie and his family (fires, the death of his wife and several children, illnesses) to divine retribution for his ill treatment of her. Per the editors of the 1986 reprint of the novel, although the heroine of the book is named "Ruth Rover", "there seems to have been no doubt in anyone's mind at the time of its publication that this book was a thinly disguised autobiography of Margaret Jewett (Smith) Bailey". The book drew on letters and her diary and journal entries, but she disguised the names of many of the principal characters (Willson becomes "Wiley", Leslie becomes "Leland", and Bailey becomes "Binney").

At the time of its release, Bailey's book received poor reviews and according to some scholars, most of the copies were destroyed. Most of the criticism of Bailey's work was due to her being a woman and a divorcee.

The Grains, which was considered a "lost" work, was republished in a single volume by the Oregon State University Press in 1986 and was produced by combining the last three known copies in existence with a separately published story.

A review of the 1986 edition notes that as a primary source, the book is a "fascinating (if seamy) insight into the workings of both daily life and internecine warfare at the 'Oregon Mission'". The reviewer thinks the book is less successful as a domestic novel such as those written by contemporaries Susan Warner and Mary Jane Holmes.

== Later life ==
Bailey married Francis Waddle in Polk County in 1855 and they divorced in 1858. Bailey later moved to the Washington Territory and married a man named Crane. She died in poverty in Seattle on May 17, 1882, as Margaret J. Crane.

== Other early Northwest works ==
Although Bailey's Grains is considered by many scholars to be the first novel published in Oregon, and she is the first Oregon woman writer to appear in print, several other early works are often mentioned as part of the literary foundation of what became the Northwestern United States.

In March 1838, Anna Maria Pittman Lee wrote the first poem in Oregon, a farewell to her husband Jason Lee. In 1843, the novel Prairie Flower was written by Sidney Walter Moss, and was probably the first novel written in Oregon. Moss, who was from Oregon City, sent the manuscript with a friend to the east coast where it was published by Stratton & Barnard in Cincinnati, Ohio under the name Emerson Bennett, a well-known author of the time. In 1852, the satiric political play Treason, Strategems, and Spoils, A Melodrame in Five Acts by Breakspear (William Lysander Adams) was published in five installments in The Oregonian and appeared later as a pamphlet. James G. Swan's The Northwest Coast, or, Three Years' Residence in Washington Territory was published in 1856.

== See also ==
- 1854 in literature
- Abigail Scott Duniway, feminist Oregon writer
- Oregon missionaries
- Frances Fuller Victor, another early Oregon writer
