= Senator Richmond =

Senator Richmond may refer to:

- George N. Richmond (1821–1896), Wisconsin State Senate
- John P. Richmond (1811–1895), Illinois State Senate
- Tom Richmond (Montana politician), Montana State Senate
- Volney Richmond (1802–1864), New York State Senate
