= Willamette Collegian =

Newspaper in Salem, Oregon

Collegian
- Type: Student newspaper
- Format: Tabloid
- Owner: Willamette University
- Founded: 1875
- Headquarters: Salem, Oregon
- Website: willamettecollegian.com

The Collegian or Willamette Collegian is the student-run newspaper of Willamette University in Salem, Oregon, United States. Founded in 1875, the weekly paper has been in continuous publication since 1889. It is a member of the College Publisher Network.

== History ==
In 1842, the Oregon Institute opened, later becoming Willamette University. The Collegian newspaper began printing in 1875. The paper was re-established in 1889, and by 1908 the monthly paper was selling for $1. In 1948, the newspaper for a record a sixteenth year in a row was named an all-star publication by the National Pacemaker Awards, a national record. Also that year the paper made statewide news with the publication of an interview with Oregon governor John Hubert Hall regarding race relations. In November 2000, the paper selected presidential candidate Ralph Nader as its athlete of the week, pining that he was responsible for the outcome of the election.

In 2001, the paper earned several distinctions from the Oregon Newspaper Publishers Association in its division, including best cartooning, best writing, and best editorial. The following year it won for best news story, best review, and was honorable mention for overall excellence. In the 2004 contest The Collegian won for best design. In 2005, the paper received an honorable mention for best graphic. In 2008, the Collegian won several awards including a general excellence honorable mention, best writing, best news story, best editorial, best review, best columnist, best sports photo, and best cartooning.

Old copies of the newspaper are archived at the Mark O. Hatfield Library on campus.
