= John Christian Keener =

American bishop

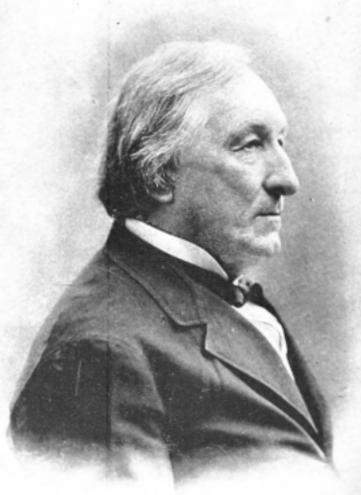
- Born: February 7, 1819; Baltimore, Maryland
- Died: January 19, 1906 (aged 86); New Orleans, Louisiana
- Education: Wesleyan University
- Occupation: Clergyman

John Christian Keener (February 7, 1819 – January 19, 1906) was an American bishop of the Methodist Episcopal Church, South, an author and an editor, and the superintendent of C.S.A. chaplains west of the Mississippi River during the American Civil War. He wrote several books on theology and edited the New Orleans Christian Advocate, a weekly Methodist newspaper sponsored by Methodist conferences in Louisiana and various nearby states in the late-19th and early-20th century. A collection of Keener's papers (1864 to 1865), available at the Stuart A. Rose Manuscript, Archives, and Rare Book Library at Emory University, include correspondence and military orders related to the return of property to the Methodist Church, South, after the war.

== Early life ==
Keener was born February 7, 1819, in Baltimore, Maryland; his father, Christian Keener, was one of the best-known Methodists of Baltimore. John was a pupil at Wilbraham Wesleyan Academy, from which he graduated. At the age of 9 he was taken into the home of Doctor Wilbur Fisk, who was principal, and kept under his care for three years. He then became a member of the first graduating class of Wesleyan University (1835), when Dr. Fisk became its first president.

== Conversion and business career ==
Keener became a committed Christian in Baltimore at the age of 19 (1838). He was superintendent of a Sunday school in Wesley chapel charge for two years, and in this work he felt the divine call to preach. After graduating from college, he entered the mercantile business as a wholesale druggist, becoming prosperous and successful. He continued in business until 1841, when he resolved to close up his business and abandon secular pursuits.

== Ordained ministry ==
He then went south and was licensed to preach. Rev. Keener joined the Alabama Annual Conference of the Methodist Episcopal Church in 1843. When the church was divided in 1844 remained with the Church, South. He was transferred to the Louisiana Conference in 1848. He was appointed to various churches in Alabama until 1853, when he went to New Orleans where he was Pastor successively of the Poydras Street, Carondelet Street, and Felicity Street churches. He was Presiding Elder of that District in 1858 and 1860. He lived in New Orleans for twenty years total, all but two years during the American Civil War.

Rev. Keener was highly esteemed by Jefferson Davis, and served as superintendent of C.S.A. Chaplains west of the Mississippi River during the Civil War. He was Presiding Elder again, 1865–70. From 1866 to 1870 he also edited the New Orleans Christian Advocate an important periodical of his denomination.

All three of his sons followed him into the Methodist ministry.

== Keener the preacher ==
Keener "feared any movement that looked toward organic union with anything or anybody" and was "firmly fixed by the agonies and horrors of reconstruction" after the American Civil War. In 1890, while other Methodists were starting to reach out to African Americans, he told the General Conference of the Methodist Episcopal Church, South that "we now have a solidly white church, for which we thank God."

He had a delicate perception of literary beauty. Bishop Charles B. Galloway said he was "An ecclesiastical leader of rare gifts and vast influence, a preacher of apostolic spirit and power, and an eminent citizen of passionate patriotism and undaunted heroism ..." Another commentator wrote of him:

while the careful discriminations in his sermons satisfy the hearer of thoughtful preparation, the neat turns of expression, well-chosen words and chaste adornments prove him to be at once the enemy of slovenliness of style and a friend to the unaffected graces of speech. He is a preacher of profit; but while true in any case that full benefit can be gained from a sermon by the attentive hearer only, it is specially true when compactness of thought and a terse rhetoric distinguish it.

== Episcopal ministry ==
Bishop Keener was elected to the episcopacy in 1870. In 1873 he founded a M.E. Church, South Mission in Mexico. He resided in a suburb of New Orleans, though he traveled through every part of the Church. He continued to pay special attention to the Mexico mission, its development and promising condition thought to have been largely due to this attention and his personal labor bestowed upon it.

Bishop Keener was honored with the D.D. degree in 1854, and that of LL.D. in 1880. He retired from the active Episcopacy in 1898, and died on January 19, 1906, in New Orleans, Louisiana, where he was also buried.

== Selected writings ==
- The Post Oak Circuit, Nashville, 1857.
- Poem: "Bishop Marvin's Missionary Tour," Ladies' Repository, 1861.
- Editor of Munsey, W.E., Sermons and Lectures, Vol. I, 1883; Vol. II, 1886.
- Studies of Bible Truths, 1899.
- The Garden of Eden and the Flood, 1900.

== Biographies ==
- Sermon, Galloway, C.B., Wesleyan Pulpit, Atlanta, 1905.
- Cyclopaedia of Methodism, Matthew Simpson, D.D., LL.D., Ed., (Revised Edition.) Philadelphia, Louis H. Everts, 1880.

== See also ==
- List of bishops of the United Methodist Church
