= Wilbraham Wesleyan Academy =

School in Massachusetts, US

Wesleyan Academy was the first name of one of the oldest educational institutions of the Methodist Episcopal Church. It was established by Methodist clergy of New England in 1818. Originally located in New Market, New Hampshire, (Note: Where the academy was originally located is now part of Newfields, New Hampshire.) before moving to Wilbraham, Massachusetts, it was intended both for general educational purposes and for young men and women intending to enter the ordained ministry. It opened with ten students, 5 women and 5 men.

== Move to Massachusetts ==
In 1824 an act of incorporation was obtained from the legislature of Massachusetts, and the academy was moved to Wilbraham, where it opened in September 1825.

Eight students were present on opening day in Massachusetts, and thirty-five attended during that first term. It had a history of coeducation and had classes of 200-300 students. Its first principal after it moved to Massachusetts was Dr. Wilbur Fisk, who served until 1831. That year he became president of Wesleyan University in Connecticut.

In 1971 the academy merged with Monson Academy, established in 1804. It became known as Wilbraham & Monson Academy. It continues to operate as a college preparatory school for grades 9-12 on the Wilbraham campus.

== Principals ==
- Wilbur Fisk (1825-1831)
- William McKendree Bangs, A.M. (1831–32)
- John Foster, A.M.(1832–34)
- David Patton, D.D. (1834–41)
- Charles Adams, D.D. (1841–45)
- Robert Allyn, D.D. (1845–48)
- Minor Raymond, D.D. (1848–64)
- Edward Cooke, D.D. (1864–74)
- Nathaniel Fellows, A.M. (1874-?)
- Gaylord William Douglass, M.A. (?-?)

== Academic facilities ==
In the 1870s, Wilbraham Wesleyan Academy was in a "healthful and beautiful" location, with extensive grounds, including farmland of 196 acres (0.79 km^{2}). There were six buildings devoted to academic purposes, the chief of which were "large and most conveniently arranged". Its library at the time contained 5,300 volumes, with "good philosophical, chemical and mathematical apparatus, a cabinet, museum, and apparatus valued at $14,000" (at that time).

== Faculty and student body ==
The academy employed "a corps of able professors" in the various departments. Its students, which included both young men and young women (indeed, one-third of the total students were women, somewhat unusual at that time), averaged between 200 and 300 per year. Many engaged in teaching and professional studies. Some prepared for college.

== Notable alumni ==
- Margaret Jewett Smith Bailey (1812?–1882), member of the Oregon Mission
- Osman Cleander Baker (1812–1871), a bishop of the Methodist Episcopal Church
- Lettie S. Bigelow (1849–1906), poet and author
- John R. Francis (1856–1913), African American obstetrician and educator
- Isaac Goodnow (1814–1894), a founder of Kansas State University and Manhattan, Kansas
- John Christian Keener (1819–1906), a bishop of the Methodist Episcopal Church, South
- Jason Lee (1803–1845), member of the Oregon Mission
- David Leslie (c. 1797–1869), member of the Oregon Mission
- Elizabeth Eunice Marcy (1821–1911), author, activist, and social reformer
- Oronhyatekha (Peter Martin) (1841–1907), (Mohawk), second accredited Native medical doctor in Canada, first aboriginal student at Oxford University, businessman and statesman
- William Rice (1821–1897), Methodist minister and librarian
- Richard S. Rust (1815–1906), Methodist preacher, abolitionist, educator, and founder of multiple colleges and institutions
- Susan J. Swift Steele (1822–1895), social reformer
- Robert H. W. Strang (1881–1982), first orthodontist in the state of Connecticut
- John W. Wescott (1849–1927), Attorney General of New Jersey
- Chloe Clark Willson (1818–1874), member of the Oregon Mission
