= William L. Adams (pioneer) =

American journalist

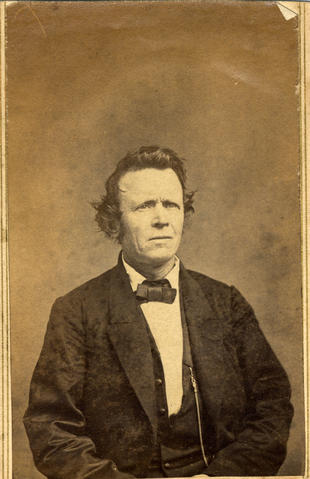

William Lysander Adams (1821–1906) was an American writer, newspaper editor, and medical doctor from Oregon.

== Early life and career ==
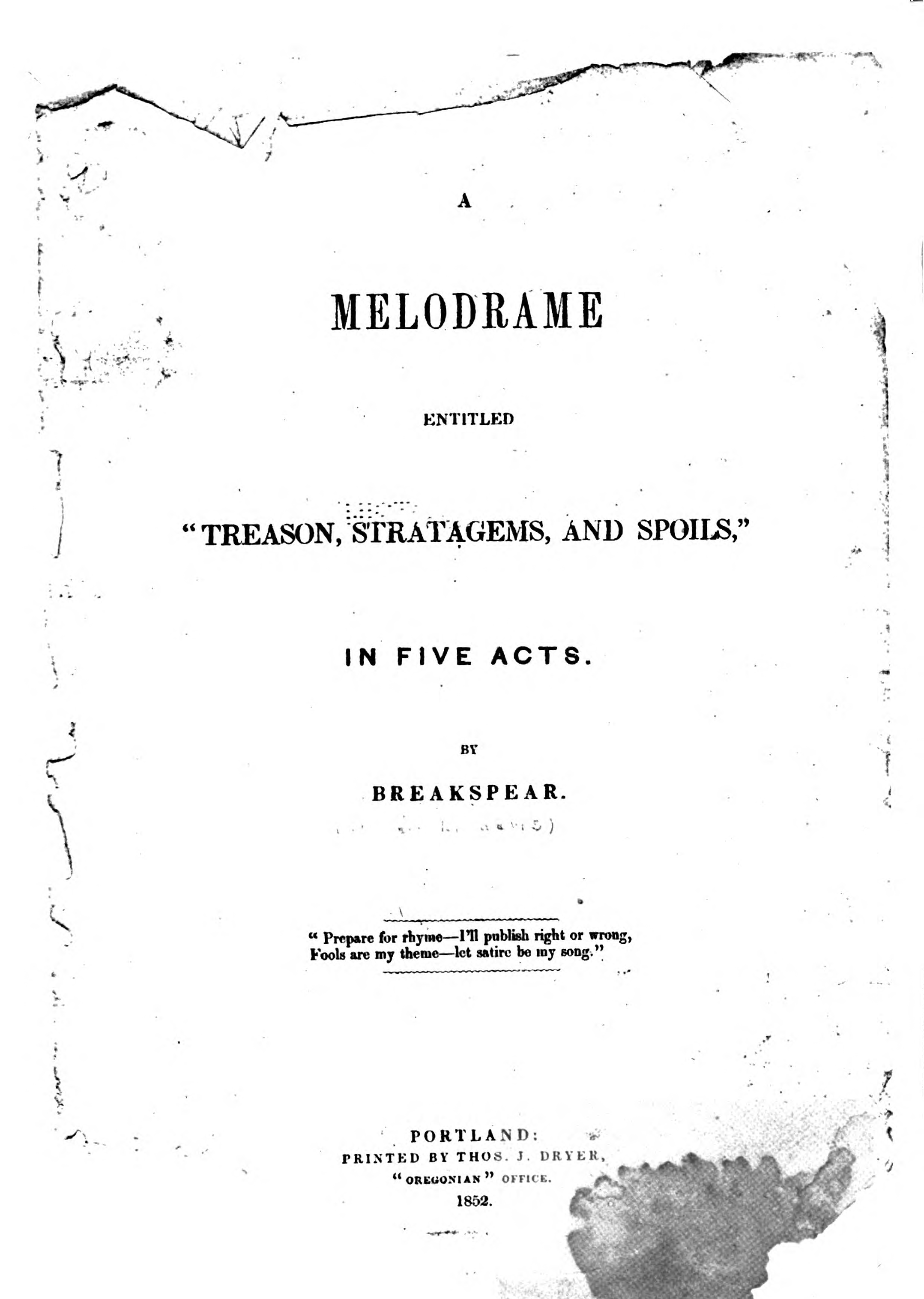
Title page of Adams' best known work

Adams was born in Oberlin, Ohio on February 5, 1821. He came to Yamhill County, Oregon in 1848. He worked as a teacher and made two trips to the California gold fields before publishing the play Treason, Strategems, and Spoils, A Melodrame in Five Acts under the pen name Breakspear in 1852. The play, a political satire that skewered the Democratic party, including Asahel Bush and his Salem Statesman, was first printed in The Oregonian, and is often cited along with Margaret Jewett Bailey's The Grains as one of the earliest works of literature written in Oregon.

In 1855, Adams bought the Oregon Spectator and renamed it the Oregon Argus. The Whig newspaper, published in Oregon City, became politically influential in the late territorial period. Adams left the newspaper business and studied medicine in Philadelphia, later practicing medicine in Portland and Hood River.

== Family and legacy ==
William L. Adams is one of the 158 names of people important to Oregon's history that are painted in the House and Senate chambers of the Oregon State Capitol. Adams' name is in the House chamber.

Adams' younger brother, Sebastian C. Adams (1825–1898), was an Oregon State Senator and writer, best known for publishing a popular illustrated history chart.
