= David Leslie (Oregon politician) =

American missionary (1797–1869)

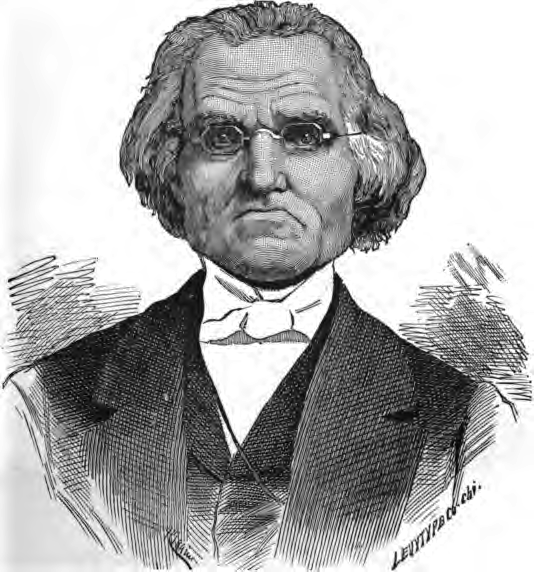
- Born: 1797; Washington, New Hampshire
- Died: March 1, 1869 (aged 71–72); Salem, Oregon
- Occupation: reverend
- Spouse: Mary A. Kinney d. 1842, Adelia Judson Olley

David Leslie (1797 – March 1, 1869) was an American missionary and pioneer in what became the state of Oregon. A native of New Hampshire, he joined Jason Lee as a missionary at the Methodist Mission in the Oregon Country in 1836. In that region he participated in the early movement to start a government and his home was used for some of these meetings. With the closing of the mission he became a founder of the city of Salem, Oregon, and board member of the Oregon Institute, which later became Willamette University.

== Early life ==
Born in New Hampshire in the town of Washington, Leslie lost his parents while he was young. Born in 1797, Leslie was the son of a minister (George Leslie) and received an education first in Salem, Massachusetts, and later at the Wilbraham Academy where fellow missionary Jason Lee would later attend. There David Leslie studied languages, especially French. He then received a license to preach at the age of 23 in 1820.

== Oregon ==
While still in New England, Leslie began work with the Methodist Episcopal Church. There he began a working relationship with Jason Lee. Lee then recruited Leslie to join the Methodist Mission in Oregon Country that Lee started in 1834. So in 1836, Leslie agreed to go to the Willamette Valley as the first set of reinforcements to the mission. Leslie, his wife Mary A. Kinney, and three daughters sailed around Cape Horn and arrived in Oregon on the Sumatra on September 7, 1837.

Once in Oregon Lee assigned Leslie to be a magistrate for the area south of the Columbia River. Then in March 1838 Leslie was left in charge of the mission while Lee traveled back east again to secure more people for the mission in what would become the Great Reinforcement of 1839. After Lee returned Leslie helped to start a branch mission with William H. Willson at Nisqually on the Puget Sound in modern Washington state. Then in 1840 from August through September David Leslie was in charge of a small group that explored further north, nearly reaching Russian-America to look for other locations for future branches of the mission.

At this time the Methodist Mission began moving from Mission Bottom to Mission Mill due to flooding at the former. Here Leslie helped construct the new sawmill and dam. He also helped organize the Methodist Episcopal Church of Salem, and then serving as its first pastor in 1841. Also in 1841 the Leslie home burned with all their possessions.

== Politics ==
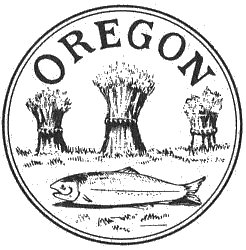
Provisional Government Seal

On February 18, 1841, a meeting was held to discuss the idea of creating a government in Oregon Country. This meeting was held at Leslie’s home, and was in part a response to the death of pioneer Ewing Young. Young had died without a will or known heir, so the settlers needed a way to settle his estate as his business dealings were entangled with many of the other settlers. Not only did David Leslie host this meeting, but he also participated in the discussions about forming a government. Although only a few decisions were ultimately made (election of Dr. Ira L. Babcock as a supreme judge to deal with the Young estate), this was the first of the Champoeg Meetings that two years later would lead to the creation of the Provisional Government of Oregon.

These subsequent meetings began in the spring of 1843. Then on May 2, 1843, a vote was held and the settlers voted in favor of creating a government in the region by a vote of 52 to 50. David Leslie participated in these meetings and he voted in favor of creating the government at the May vote at Champoeg.

== Family ==
During this time in Oregon, Leslie and his wife had two more daughters, but Mary died in February 1842. Mary was buried at the Pioneer Cemetery, which was part of the Leslie land claim as the first person buried there. Without his wife to assist in raising the children, Leslie decided to take them to a mission in Hawaii where there was a school for them. As they waited to leave Astoria on the mouth of the Columbia River, one of the daughters (Satira age 15) left the ship and married Cornelius Rogers. Leslie accepted the marriage and then left two other daughters, Helen and Aurelia, in the new couples’ care. Leslie then continued on to Hawaii where he left the two remaining daughters Mary and Sarah at a boarding school. Sarah died a year later in Hawaii, while Cornelius, Satira and Aurelia also died that year in Oregon when their canoe went over Willamette Falls. Additionally two natives and Nathaniel Crocker died in that accident of February 1843.

By spring of 1843 David Leslie had returned from Hawaii to the mission. However, by this time the mission was beginning to be closed in Salem for a lack of natives to convert due to disease that had decimated the original inhabitants of the region. The missionary board had sent the Reverend George Gary from New York to reorganize the mission. He was housed in Leslie’s home. Still Leslie remained and married Adelia Judson Olley on January 7, 1844. Adelia brought two-year-old Robert Thomas to the marriage from her prior marriage to the deceased James Olley. She was the sister of Reverend Lewis H. Judson. The new couple had two children, Emma and Sarah, both of whom died before the age of seven. The only child to outlive Leslie was Helen.

== Later life ==
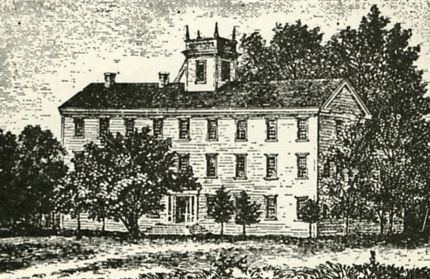
The Oregon Institute circa 1844 in present-day Salem.

After the closing of the Methodist Mission in Salem, David Leslie received the land in what is now between Bush's Pasture Park and the Willamette River, and McGilchrist and Mission streets in Salem. On that land he grew apples and pears, and built the fourth house in the city. In 1845, he was elected as the president of the board of trustees at the Oregon Institute, and he held that role until his death. During this time Oregon Institute would become Willamette University, and Leslie laid the cornerstone for Waller Hall that still stands today as the oldest building on Willamette’s campus.

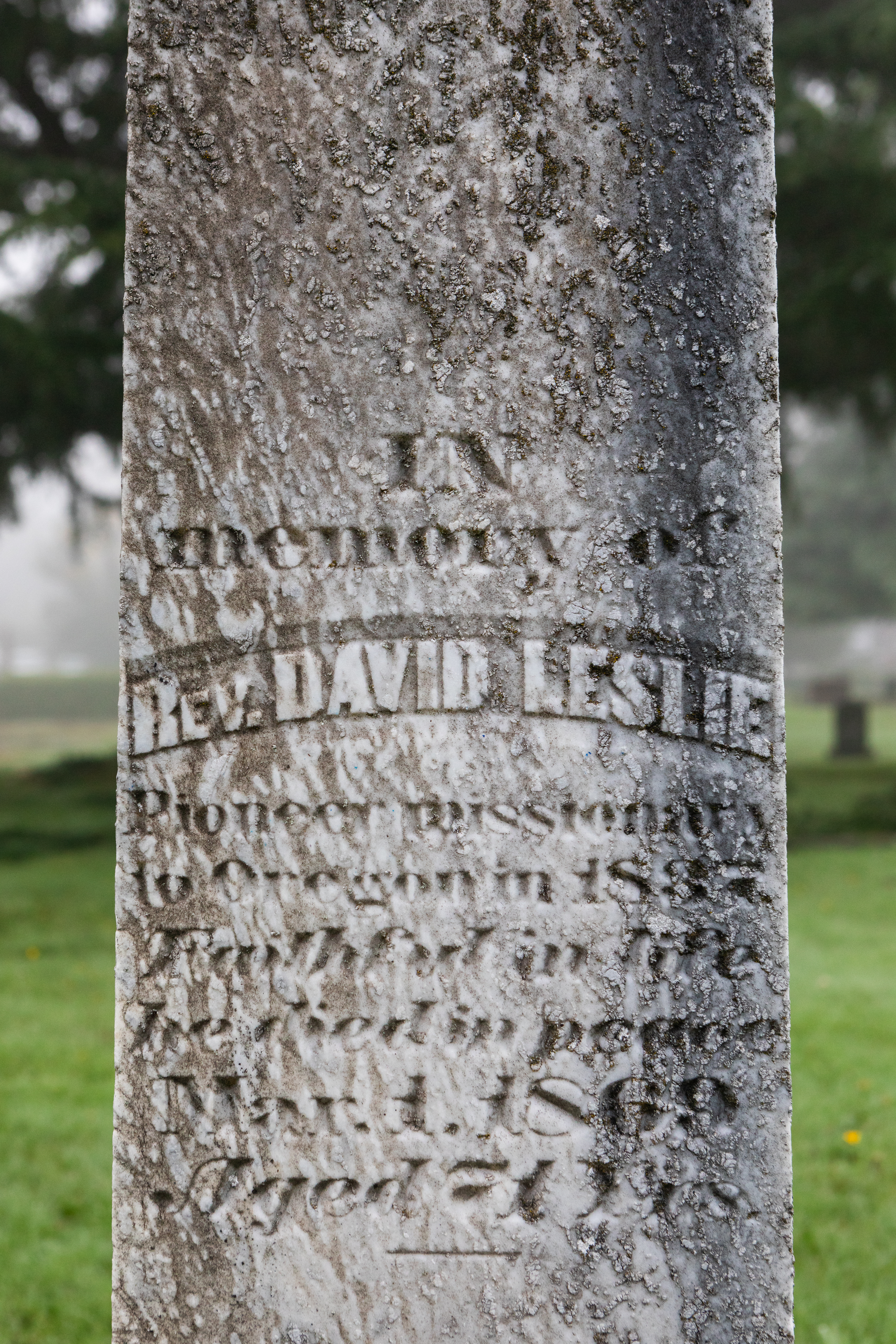
Gravestone of Rev. David Leslie in Salem Pioneer Cemetery, Salem, Oregon.

Meanwhile, in 1860 he sold 100 acres (0.40 km^{2}) of his farm to Asahel Bush II. In the civic arena, he helped found the local Masonic Order chapter, the local Grand Lodge of A. F. and A. M., and served as the territory’s first chaplain of the legislature. Leslie died on May 1, 1869, in Salem, Oregon, and was buried at the I.O.O.F. cemetery. This is the same cemetery in which his first wife is buried.

== Legacy ==
Leslie Middle School in Salem, Oregon is named in his honor.
