= Nisqually Mission =

Methodist Mission in Washington from 1840 until 1842

The Nisqually Mission was a branch of the Methodist Mission, the only one established north of the Columbia River. The station was opened in 1840 and used until 1842, when John P. Richmond returned to the United States of America. The location of the mission is in modern DuPont, Washington.

== Operations ==
In 1838 Jason Lee instructed Leslie Wilson to establish a house near Fort Nisqually. An arrival aboard the Lausanne, John P. Richmond, was appointed as the missionary of the area. The staff of the mission included Wilson and a teacher, Chloe Clark, who married while there. The diet of the families included oysters and clams which were given to them from the Nisqually people. Support for the station also came from John McLoughlin, who ordered donations of peas and flour along with the loaning of milk cows.

Richmond attended the celebration of the Fourth of July at American Lake held by the visiting United States Exploring Expedition in 1841. In an oration heard by the commanding officer Charles Wilkes and Duwamish chief Slugamus, Richmond stated that "The time will come... when these hills and valleys will have become peopled by our free and enterprising countrymen..."

== Closure ==
Richmond began to lose interest in proselytizing by 1841, as he considered the Indigenous populations "fast sinking into the grave. Extinction seems to be their inevitable doom..." After a year and a half of residency on the Puget Sound he departed with his family back to the United States. After the Nisqually station was abandoned François Blanchet reported that "His house was a little palace. I am told that a short time after his departure the natives set it on fire."

== Bibliography ==
- Blanchet, François Norbert; Demers, Modeste; Bolduc, Jean-Baptiste-Zacharie; Langlois, Antoine (1956). Landerholm, Carl (ed.). Notices & Voyages of the Famed Quebec Mission to the Pacific Northwest. Portland, OR: Champoeg Press. hdl:2027/mdp.39015009137731.
- Brosnan, Cornelius J. (Cornelius James) (1932). Jason Lee, prophet of the new Oregon. New York, New York: The Macmillan Company – via Internet Archive.
- Gatke, Robert Moulton (1935). "A Document of Mission History, 1833–43". Oregon Historical Quarterly. 36 (1). Portland, OR: Oregon Historical Society: 71–94. ISSN 0030-4727. JSTOR 20610913.
- Hunt, Herbert; Kaylor, Floyd C. (1917). Washington, West of the Cascades. Tacoma: S.J. Clarke Publishing Company – via Google Books.
- Meeker, Ezra (1905). Pioneer Reminiscences of Puget Sound. Seattle: Lowman & Hanford Stationery Printing Co. – via Google Books.
