= Methodist Mission in Oregon =

19th-century Christian conversion effort

The Methodist Mission was the Methodist Episcopal Church's 19th-century conversion efforts in the Pacific Northwest. Local Indigenous cultures were introduced to western culture and Christianity. Superintendent Jason Lee was the principal leader for almost a decade. Two years after the mission began, the church's Board of Foreign Missions described its intent to reclaim "these wandering savages, who are in a very degraded state, to the blessings of Christianity and civilized life." Alongside the missions founded in the region, several secular operations were opened. These were maintained to allow for material independence from the Hudson's Bay Company (HBC), then the preeminent economic entity in the region among European descendants.

The Methodists were active participants in the Oregon boundary dispute. Members of the mission were part of sending three petitions to United States Congress requesting that the United States extend its jurisdiction over the Pacific Northwest south of the Columbia River. The Methodist stations became important centers for local European-American politics as well. Staff took part in establishing the Provisional Government of Oregon, a settler organization based in the Willamette Valley.

Jason Lee's leadership was criticized by members attached to various posts; his failure to provide adequate financial accounting led to his dismissal in 1843 as superintendent. To reduce the financial burdens on the church, many mission stations were abandoned and the commercial activities were sold off in 1844. While the main station in the Willamette Valley remained active in missionary efforts, it no longer held as much prominence in the changing political scene of Oregon. Despite failure in converting the natives west of the Rocky Mountains, the Methodist Mission played a significant role in the westward expansion of the United States of America.

== Background ==
In 1832, four Nez Perce Indians and Salish (also known as Flatheads) traveled to St. Louis, Missouri. They sought out a meeting with General William Clark of the Lewis and Clark Expedition per the instructions of their tribe. General Clark was trusted, having met with their fathers and hearing the stories of his greatness from them. They viewed him as "the first great chief of the white man to visit their nation" and wanted to inquire about the "book of which they were informed by the hunters, which the Great Spirit had given the white man to teach them his will." General Clark was asked about the event two years later and recounted that two of the four had fallen ill and died while still in St. Louis. The other two embarked on the return journey home with word eventually returning that one had died during the voyage and the other had made it to his destination. There was speculation as to how truthful this ending of the story was and that both had likely perished along the way.

The visit of St. Louis by the delegation was announced by William Walker, a Wydandot Methodist, who published an article in the Christian Advocate and Journal. The editorial inspired the Methodist Episcopal Church and other churches to begin the first transcontinental missions in Oregon Country. President Willbur Fisk of Wesleyan University in Middletown, Connecticut was the first church leader to respond, by advising the establishment of a mission among the "Flathead" people. A former student of his, Jason Lee, and his nephew Rev. Daniel Lee volunteered to serve as ministers in Oregon. Jason Lee was a young teacher from Ontario, Canada and was involved in missionary work to Indians in that region. Bishop Elijah Hedding ordained Lee into the New England Conference of the Methodist Episcopal Church, now the United Methodist Church. He was appointed superintendent of the newly created "Aboriginal Mission west of the Rocky Mountains" to preach to the Salish. The entrepreneur Nathaniel Jarvis Wyeth was contacted by the Methodists to travel overland with his party and to ship supplies around Cape Horn on Wyeth's ship May Dacre, a proposition he agreed to.

== Early years ==
The now Rev. Lee left Boston for St. Louis in March 1834 with Daniel Lee, to rendezvous with Wyeth and his group. Along the way two laypersons, Cyrus Shepard from Boston, Massachusetts, and Philip Leget Edwards, from Missouri were hired by Daniel to accompany them. After crossing the continent the Methodists met Thomas McKay of the British Hudson's Bay Company (HBC) at Wyeth's recently created Fort Hall. McKay guided the group all the way to Fort Vancouver, headquarters of the HBC Columbia District, in what is now Vancouver, Washington. Lee and his companions were greeted by Chief Factor John McLoughlin, district director of the HBC. McLoughlin recommended the Willamette Valley as a better spot for settlement than the area to the north where the Flathead lived.

Upon entering the valley, the Methodists came in contact with the Kalapuya, residents of the Willamette Valley. Epidemics of malaria had begun to afflict the Kalapuya and neighboring Chinookan peoples of the Lower Columbia region starting in 1830, and continued throughout the decade. While accurate reports of population numbers of local indigenous peoples are few, the diseases certainly decimated their populations. Upon visiting the various indigenous tribes of the Lower Columbia region, Daniel Lee reported that they were the "most degraded human beings that we have met", and concluded that "the time is not far distant when the last deathwail will proclaim their universal extermination." It is often said that on September 28, 1834, Rev. Jason Lee preached the first Protestant sermon on the Pacific coast, yet, to be precise, he was perhaps fifty miles from the Pacific coast.

=== Mission Bottom ===
Lee ignored the missionary board's instructions and set up a mission located 60 miles up the Willamette River from its junction with the Columbia. The original mission became known as either the Willamette Mission or Mission Bottom. Missionaries untrained in manual labor slowly built log cabins and a school before the first winter set in. Lee remarked, "Men never worked harder or performed less." At the request of the superintendent, the Board changed the Mission's designation to "Oregon Mission" on October 21, 1835. In March 1836, Rev. Lee wrote to Dr. Fisk telling of the need for tradesmen and farmers to relieve the staff of temporal duties. This resulted in additional members being sent in 1836 and 1837. In the same year the Methodists received a small donation from McLoughlin and other employees of the HBC, hoping that God would "bless and prosper your pious endeavours."

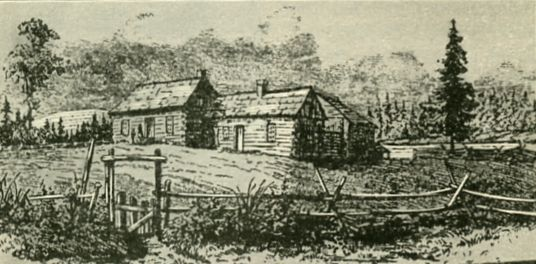
The Mission Bottom in 1834.

Arriving in May 1837 at Fort Vancouver on the ship Diana was a party of seven adults and four children under the leadership of Dr. Elijah White. Included in the party was White's wife, William H. Willson, Anna Maria Pittman, Alanson Beers, Susan Downing, and Elvira Johnson. Several marriages were soon contracted, with a double marriage ceremony of Jason Lee to Anna Pittman and Cyrus Shepard to Susan Downing occurring on June 16, 1837. A second group consisting of a teacher, Margaret Jewett Bailey, and two more ministers, David Leslie and H. K. W. Perkins, arrived at the Mission on September 7, 1837.

As the number of members increased, missionaries added a large granary and hospital to Mission Bottom and eventually a small retail store was opened. Surplus manufactured goods were traded for items such as lumber or food stuffs with the French Canadian settlers and the Native Americans. The mission also began to provide for the protection of American immigrants in the area by appointing a magistrate and constable in 1838. John Sutter, while traveling to Alta California, visited the Mission Bottom over several weeks in 1838. Lee also preached and performed marriages and baptisms for the Catholic French-Canadian settlers of the French Prairie. There were no Catholic priests yet in the Willamette Valley, thus the Methodists were the first priests to engage the French-Canadians. François Norbert Blanchet and Modeste Demers reached the region in 1838 and held the first mass at the St. Paul church in January 1839.

== Expansion ==
By the end of 1837 Lee was leading a community divided about his leadership. The community advised him to return to the east as it "would result advantageously to himself and the mission." Additionally a petition was sent to him from fellow missionaries advising he resign as superintendent. In March 1838, Jason Lee and Phillip Edwards began the planned visit to the United States to recruit more laborers for the mission. With them were two Chinookan teenagers christened William Brooks and Thomas Adams along with three of Thomas Mckay's mixed race sons. Before departing Lee appointed David Leslie as acting superintendent. The group first visited the newly opened Wascopam Mission as they traveled up the Columbia. While waiting on an escort of the HBC headed to the annual rendezvous the party spent several weeks at the ABCFM missionary posts ran by Henry H. Spalding and Marcus Whitman. On this journey they carried a petition signed by 36 pioneer farmers from both the American and French-Canadian communities along with members of the Methodist mission asking the United States Congress to create a territory out of Oregon lying south of the Columbia River. Without the protection of the American government, a "good community" would not form and only "the reckless and unprincipled adventurer..." would move to the region the address warned.

Upon entering the United States in Missouri a messenger dispatched from John McLoughlin informed Lee that his wife Anna Maria Pittman Lee and infant child died in June. While the Methodists and Chinooks were holding a speech in Peoria, Illinois, Thomas Adams fell ill and stayed there to recover. His stories of the lands west of the Rocky Mountains helped inspire the Peoria Party. Lee also lectured along the way and on the East Coast, leading to the raising of $42,000 for the missionary efforts. The lectures included speeches from William Brooks, and both speakers tended focused more on public donations than amassing pioneers to head West. The Board continued this theme in an advertisement recruiting farmers for the mission, wanting only "pious" men. While in a conference with the Board Lee requested for a replacement, though the Board retained him as superintendent. Other members of the Oregon Mission had often mentioned in letters to the Board of the need to "civilize" the various native peoples before they could be converted. Lee took the opposite position in the meetings, stressing the need for conversion before "civilization" could occur.

Jason Lee sailed back to Oregon in 1840 aboard the ship Lausanne with the "Great Reinforcement". Besides the superintendent, the Lausanne brought 50 people, including needed tradesmen, teachers, and physicians along with 12 children. With this arrival the population of Mission Bottom was forty adults and fifty children. The additional missionaries and laymen, as with previous "reinforcements", allowed for more extensive operations across the Oregon Country. In a meeting on 10 May 1840 the missionaries were given their appointments. After returning Lee ordered the abandonment of Mission Bottom to the Mission Mill or Willamette station in what is now Salem. Two new stations were ordered to begin missionary operations, the Clatsop Mission and Nisqually Mission. George Abernethy was appointed steward of the secular services of the Mission, allowing for Lee to focus on proselytization. Methodist commercial activities reached their zenith, with two timber mills and a grist mill opened on Mill Creek, with operational costs being upwards of $10 daily to run. The main mercantile store of the Mission was transferred to Oregon City in August 1842.

=== Planned Umpqua Mission ===
As early as February 1838 Jason Lee had considered establishing a mission among the Umpquas and explored the area but was unable to come in contact with any. The considered station was to be located in the vicinity of the HBC Fort Umpqua. After the Lausanne and its passengers arrived in Oregon, Gustavus Hines and Rev. William W. Kone were appointed to work in the region. A party was organized in August 1840 composed of Jason Lee, a native guide, Hines and White to find a suitable location for the mission. The group was greeted at Fort Umpqua by Jean Baptiste Gagnier and his wife Angelique, a daughter of an Umpqua chief, acted as an interpreter for them. While meeting with the Umpquas, one chief stressed that their reputation of being "a bad people" was undeserved and they desired for a priest. The negative impression of the Umpquas was gained after the murder of the majority of a fur trapping party under Jedediah Smith in 1828. The Methodists however never opened a station among the Umpquas, with Hines concluding:

The Umpqua tribe, but a few years ago numbering several hundred, by disease and their family wars has been reduced to less than seventy-five souls. Under the impression that the doom of extinction is suspended over this wretched race, and that the hand of Providence is removing them to give place to a people more worthy of this beautiful and fertile country,...

== Educational efforts ==
When the housing at the Mission Bottom was complete, the Indian Mission School was built to be used to teach the Native American children the ways of Western society. Cyrus Shepard became the first teacher of the school in March 1835. The students came from a variety of Native tribes, which over the years included Kalapuyas, Cayuses, Chehalis (the Sts'ailes, and the Upper and Lower Chehalis peoples), Walla Wallas, Iroquois, Shastas, Tillamooks, Klickitats, Umpquas, Chinooks, and even Hawaiians. Additionally there was participation from the children of the French-Canadian settlers and Native wives. Besides being the main source of labor for maintaining the growing farms, the students also hunted game for the mission. The initial class had 14 Native students though during the summer upwards of 40 were in attendance. Over the years illness from exposure to new diseases killed many students, and some ran away. Relatives of deceased students sometimes blamed the Methodists and occasionally attempted to get revenge, though no acts of violence have been recorded. Shepard died on January 1, 1840, and the school went into a decline without his teaching abilities. The school was relocated to the Mission Mill in 1842 in a building under construction with a budget of $40,000 planned to accommodate upwards of 300 students.

A song taught to the girls of the school illustrates the limitations of using Chinook Jargon to preach religious concepts.

Chinook Jargon lyrics	English translation
Mican tum-tum Cloosh?	Your heart good?
Mican tum-tum wake cloosh.	Your heart no good.
Alaka mican ma-ma lose.	Bye-and-bye you die.
Mican tum-tum cloosh mican clatamy Sakalatie.	Your heart good you go to God.
Sakalatie mamoke hiyas cloosh mican tum-tum.	God make very good your heart.
Hiyack wah-wah Sakalatie.	Quick speak to God.

After almost a decade of operation the viability of the school was in doubt. An assessment by mission members was not promising with the most positive feature being "quite a number had experienced religion here and died when in school and hopefully gone to heaven." The students at that time were cultivating 34 acres fields of peas, potatoes, wheat and oats outside the school. Runaway students were treated as "criminals", and when caught "[they were] put in chains, severely whipped, &c., &c., guarded and kept in a high enclosure, like prisoners."

=== Oregon Institute ===
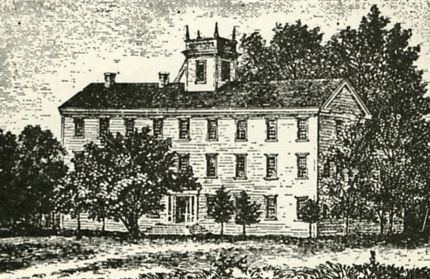
The Oregon Institute founded in 1842.

In Salem on January 17, 1842, at Jason Lee's home, a group of settlers met and formed the Oregon Institute as a school for the Euro-American children in the area, eventually evolving into present-day Willamette University. A ten-person board of trustees was created; they selected the Wallace House three miles north of Salem to serve as the school. Later in 1844, the school opened in the new building intended for the indigenous with Chloe A. Clark Willson as the first teacher of the school, considered the first for European-American children west of the state of Missouri. (Note: Early Oregon histories bragged that this was the first school for European Americans west of the Mississippi River, but St. Louis Academy was founded by Jesuits in St Louis, Missouri in 1818.)

== Reduction of mission activities ==
There was considerable concern that the account of the mission had been "injudiciously managed" by the board in 1841. Additionally criticisms of Jason Lee from Elijah White, John P. Richmond, Gustavus Hines and other mission members were sent over the years to the board. While David Leslie had remained supportive of Lee, it wasn't enough to counter the negative appraisals. After receiving instructions to detail the financial history of the mission, Lee admitted he "was not accountant enough to understand ..." No action by the Methodist Church was taken until July 1843, when Rev. George Gary was appointed as the new superintendent. The board wanted a "more full and satisfactory account of this Mission, than our present information will permit" and instructed Gary "to curtail the secular departments of the mission..." In early 1844 Lee determined to meet with the Missionary Board once more. While in the Kingdom of Hawaii he learned from Ira Babcock of his dismissal and replacement. Shortly after reading the letter, the former superintendent crossed Mexico and reached New York City in May 1844. During a conference with his superiors in June, it was determined that Lee would not be given his position back until after a financial report from Gary arrived. Lee began to collect donations for the school he helped form, the Oregon Institute, and while in his hometown Stanstead on March 12, 1845, he died.

After holding a meeting on June 7, 1844, with the other members of the mission Gary determined to discontinue most of the operations. The Dalles and the Mission Hill stations were to remain open with the others closed. After the sales the focus of the mission turned to the settlers and away from attempting to converting the indigenous peoples of the region. The grain and timber mills were sold for $6,000 to a pioneer who resided in Oregon for the previous two years. The extensive herds of horse and cattle brought another $4,200 for the treasury. The majority of the plots claimed by the Methodists in Oregon City were sold to John McLoughlin for $6,000. The Clatsop mission was purchased by its missionary Rev. Parrish, who settled there. The Indian Labor School building was sold to the Oregon Institute board of trustees for $4,000. The Wascopam Mission was sold for $600 to Marcus Whitman in 1847, though his death in the Whitman Massacre left the post unused and was returned to the Methodist Mission in 1849.

After the reduction of the mission operations Gary requested in August 1845 a new superintendent be sent to replace him. His successor, Rev. William Roberts, appeared in June 1847 after establishing a church in San Francisco. In 1848 the Methodists organised the "Oregon and California Mission Conference" which had six clergy, four being in Oregon. In an endeavor with large sums of money were spent, the Methodist Mission of Oregon ultimately had results left in a "painful mystery". After 14 years of operation the Methodists had 348 members in Oregon, the vast majority being settlers. Before the division of the Oregon and California Conference in 1852, California already surpassed Oregon for number of Methodist converts.

== Legacy ==
With the flood in 1861, all buildings at the Mission Bottom site were washed away except the granary and hospital. Today the site is preserved as Willamette Mission State Park. Some of the original structures of the Willamette station may be seen at Mission Mill Museum located in Salem.

A city street and a cemetery in Salem bear the name of Jason Lee. A statue of Jason Lee stands in the U. S. Capitol Building's Statuary Hall in Washington, D.C. as one of the two statues allotted to the state of Oregon.

== See also ==
- Champoeg Meetings

== Bibliography ==
- Boyd, Robert (1996), People of the Dalles: The Indians of Wascopam Mission, University of Nebraska Press
- Brosnan, Cornelius J. (1932), Jason Lee, Prophet of New Oregon, Macmillan Company
- Carey, Charles (1922), "Methodist Annual Reports", The Quarterly of the Oregon Historical Society, 23 (4), Oregon Historical Society: 303–364
- Clarke, S. A. (1905), Pioneer Days of Oregon History, vol. 2, J. K. Gill Company
- Lee, Daniel; Frost, Joseph H. (1844), Ten Years in Oregon, New York: J. Collard. ISBN 978-0-598-28584-3
- Loewenberg, Robert (1973), ""Not... by Feeble Means": Daniel Lee's Plan to Save Oregon", The Quarterly of the Oregon Historical Society, 74 (1), Oregon Historical Society: 71–78
- Loewenberg, Robert J. (1976), Equality on the Oregon Frontier: Jason Lee and the Methodist Mission, 1834-1843, University of Washington Press
- Loewenberg, Robert J. (1978), "New Evidence, Old Categories: Jason Lee as Zealot", Pacific Historical Review, 47 (3): 343–368, doi:10.2307/3637471, JSTOR 3637471
- Luccock, Halford; Hutchinson, Paul (1926), The Story of Methodism, The Methodist Book Concern
- Ludwig, Charles (1993), Jason Lee, Winner of the Northwest, Fromm International
- Smith, Sarah Gilbert White; et al. (1999), The Mountains We Have Crossed: Diaries and Letters of the Oregon Mission, 1838, University of Nebraska
- Whaley, Gray (2010), Oregon and the collapse of Illahee: U.S. empire and the transformation of an indigenous world, 1792-1859, University of North Carolina Press
- Hines, Gustavus (1851), Life on the Plains of the Pacific. Oregon: Its History, Condition and Prospects, Buffalo, New York: Geo. H. Derby and Co., OL 23364697M
