= John P. Richmond =

American politician

John Plastis Richmond (August 7, 1811 – August 28, 1895) was an American Methodist Episcopalian priest and politician who served in New York, Illinois, Mississippi, the Pacific Northwest, and South Dakota during the 19th century.

== Early life ==
Richmond was born in Middletown, Maryland, on August 7, 1811. His father's name was Francis. At 15, Richmond was converted and became a member of the Methodist Episcopal Church. He attended the University of Pennsylvania in Philadelphia and graduated with a medical degree in 1833. He started to practice medicine in Middletown in 1834 and was licensed to exhort by his church. In 1835 he moved to Mississippi to practice medicine and on October 14, 1835, in Madison County, Mississippi, he married America Walker Talley, the widow of Alexander Talley. Alexander was a prominent member of the church and was superintendent of the Choctaw Indian Mission. In April 1836, the pair moved to Rushville, Illinois, where Richmond preached. Over the following three years, Richmond was assigned to various preaching circuits and at various churches in Illinois, including the Pulaski Circuit, at McComb Station, and at Jacksonville. In 1839, Richmond met Jason Lee who was looking for missionaries who would go to Oregon. By that point, Richmond had one daughter with America and two step-daughters from her previous marriage.

== Career ==
=== Northwest Territory ===
In 1839, Richmond and his family began their move to Oregon. They travelled up the Illinois River and then by land to Chicago, and then by steam through the Great Lakes and Erie Canal to Troy, New York and then to New York City. On October 9, 1839, the family departed as a part of a company of 52 consisting of missionaries, teachers, and laymen on the ship, Lausanne. The ship sailed around Cape Horn, making dock at Rio de Janeiro, Valparaiso, Chile, and the Sandwich Islands before arriving at Fort Vancouver on June 1, 1840. The missionaries met with Lee on June 13 and were assigned posts, Richmond appointed superintendent of the Nisqually Mission where he was sent with his family as well as a carpenter named Holden Willson and a teacher named Chloe Carke. Nisqually Mission was located near Fort Nisqually, and Richmond spent some time at the fort before arriving at the mission on July 10, 1842. In August, Richmond performed the marriage of Willson and Clarke, the first marriage of Europeans on Puget Sound. At the mission, Richmond was on territory contested between America and Great Britain, and Richmond worked to accommodate the multi-faceted politics of the two nations and the Indians. In 1841, he became acquainted with US Naval Officer and explorer, Charles Wilkes, and Richmond's speech on July 5, 1841, commemorating the first fourth of July celebration in the region, to a gathering which included Wilkes was noted for its patriotism in Oregon newspapers of the time. On September 1, 1842, Richmond and his family left Nisqually on The Chamamus, arriving in Newburyport, Massachusetts, in 1843 by way of the Sandwich Islands and Tahiti. There is some uncertainty why Richmond left, there may have been illness in his family, but he had also developed antagonism with Lee. This antagonism was serious, as in the future he may not have been a member of a Methodist Conference, although he continued to preach at Methodist Churches and Missions. The antagonism ended before Richmond's death and Richmond would later write fondly of Lee and the role he played in obtaining the Northwest for the United States.

=== Return to Illinois and political career ===
Lee then returned to Illinois, where he served in Petersburg, Springfield, Rushville Circuit, Quincey, and Mt. Sterling. He also became involved with politics, being a strong democrat. He was opposed to politicization of slavery, and succeeded in a number of state and local elections. In 1848 he was elected to the State Senate where he served until 1852. He spent the next year preaching in Mississippi and then returned to Illinois where in 1854 he was elected to the State House of Representatives. In 1856 he was elected a member of the electoral college where he was a part of the delegation which brought the returns of Illinois voters to the capital. In 1858 he was again elected to the state Senate, having received support from the Douglas wing of the state party. He was a member of the Illinois State Constitutional Convention in 1862 which did not succeed at ratifying a new constitution and is known as the copperhead convention due to the politics of many of the delegates. In 1865 he was elected Brown County superintendent of schools where he served for 8 years while living in Mt. Sterling, Illinois. In 1874 he moved to the Dakota Territory where he became superintendent of the Bon Homme Mission, serving one year. He continued to preach in the coming years and in 1884 was postmaster at Tyndall in what would become South Dakota. He also owned a farm near Tyndall.

== Family and death ==
Richmond had two step-daughters, Martha A. and Harriette Talley. His first daughter was Felicia, born near Pulaski, Illinois on October 3, 1837. His second child and first son was named Oregon and was born in late summer or fall of 1839 in New York while the family was on their way to the Pacific Northwest. Their third child and second son, Francis, was born February 28, 1842, and was the first white American born in the Pacific Northwest north of the Columbia River. He had a fourth child with America, John P, and possibly a fifth, Alice. America died sometime before 1859. Richmond remarried a woman named Kitty Grisby on October 18, 1859, and had three more daughters, America, Cora, and Corona.

His son, Oregon, became politically active in Bon Homme County, South Dakota, being the counties first judge and the last probate judge of the territory in the county before South Dakota became a state in 1889. He also owned a newspaper, the Scotland Citizen with A. J. Kogen. Francis was a teacher and in 1883 became superintendent of schools at Bon Homme County.

Richmond died on August 28, 1895, possibly in Oakdale, Nebraska.

== Bibliography ==
- Howell, Erle. John P. Richmond, MD. Methodist History October 1970
