= Willamette University =

Private university in Salem, Oregon, US

- Former names: Oregon Institute (1842–1852); Wallamet University (1852–1870)
- Motto: Non nobis solum nati sumus (Latin)
- Motto in English: Not unto ourselves alone are we born
- Type: Private liberal arts college
- Established: February 1, 1842; 184 years ago
- Accreditation: NWCCU
- Religious affiliation: Methodist Mission
- Academic affiliations: Annapolis Group; IAMSCU
- Endowment: $328.7 million (2025)
- President: Stephen E. Thorsett
- Faculty: 247 (2020)
- Administrative staff: 438 (2020)
- Students: 2,402 (2022–23)
- Undergraduates: 1,367 (2022–23)
- Location: Salem, Oregon, United States; 44°56′09″N 123°01′53″W
- Campus: Urban, 60 acres (0.24 km^{2})
- Newspaper: Willamette Collegian
- Colors: Cardinal and Gold
- Nickname: Bearcats
- Sporting affiliations: NCAA Division III – Northwest
- Mascot: Blitz
- Website: willamette.edu

Willamette University is a private liberal arts college in Salem, Oregon, United States. Founded in 1842 prior to Oregon becoming a US territory, it is the oldest college in the Western United States. Originally named the Oregon Institute, the school was an unaffiliated outgrowth of the Methodist Mission in the Willamette Valley. The name of the school was changed to Wallamet University in 1852, followed by the current spelling in 1870. The urban campus sits across the street from the Oregon State Capitol. Waller Hall is the oldest building on campus, and is listed on the National Register of Historic Places.

Willamette founded the first medical school and law school in the Pacific Northwest in the second half of the 19th century. The medical school later became part of Oregon Health & Science University, while the law school remains the oldest in the Northwest. Approximately 2,400 students are enrolled at Willamette between its undergraduate and graduate programs. Graduateschools are the college of law and the MBA program. After it merged with the Pacific Northwest College of Art in 2021, Willamette has an additional campus in Portland, Oregon which also contains a graduate education center. The college is a Division III member of the National Collegiate Athletic Association (NCAA), competing as the Bearcats in the Northwest Conference.

== History ==
The college was founded as the Oregon Institute by the missionary Jason Lee, who had arrived in what was then known as the Oregon Country in 1834 and had founded the Indian Manual Labor Institute for the education of the local Native Americans. Lee requested additional support for his mission, and received 53 additional volunteers in 1839, who arrived on the ship Lausanne. After a series of meetings in Lee's home, the by-laws were adopted and board of trustees elected and the institute was officially established on February 1, 1842. The Oregon Institute officially opened on August 13, 1844, with a total of five students and one teacher, Mrs. Chloe Clarke Willson. Lee served as the first President of the Board of Trustees, followed by David Leslie after Lee's death in 1845. Leslie would serve until his death in 1869. The original purpose of the institute was the education of the missionaries' children.

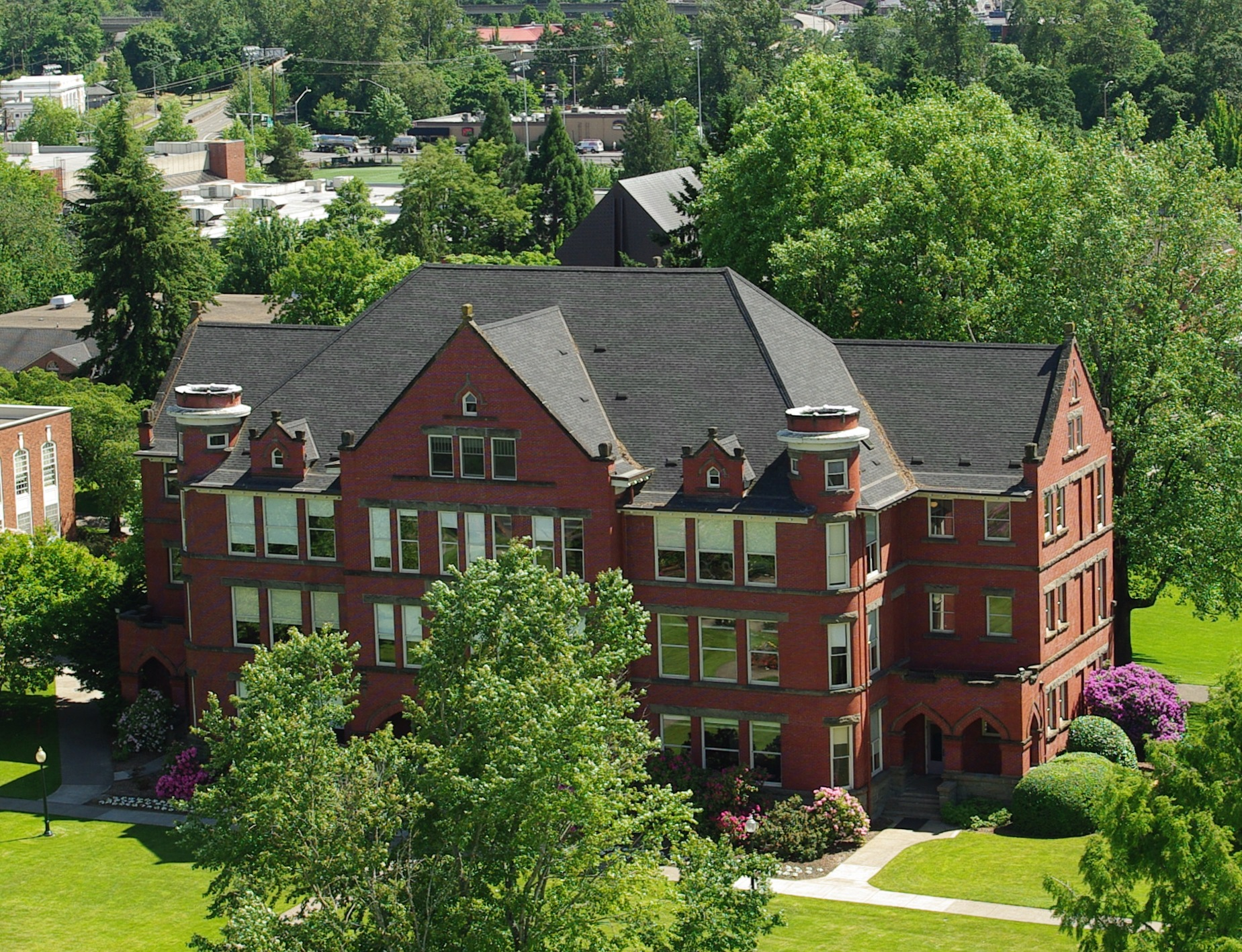
Eaton Hall built in 1909

The original building of the institute was a three-story frame structure first occupied in 1844. At the time, it was one of the largest structures in the Pacific Northwest. It housed the first session of the state legislature to meet in Salem after the capital was moved there in 1851. The building burned down in 1872. In 1867, a new brick building was finished to house the school and named University Hall. The building was renamed as Waller Hall in 1912 to honor the Reverend Alvin F. Waller, and is now the oldest university building west of the Mississippi River still in use. The first president was Francis S. Hoyt, who served in that position from 1853 until 1860 and was replaced by Thomas Milton Gatch who is the only president of the school to serve as president two different times.

The name of the institution was changed to "Wallamet University" in 1852. The following year, the Oregon Territorial Legislature granted a charter to the university. The first graduate was Emily J. York, who received a degree as Mistress of English Literature in 1859. In 1866, the university established the first school of medicine in the Pacific Northwest. The current spelling of the university was adopted in 1870. In 1883, the university established the first law school in the Pacific Northwest during the presidency of Thomas Van Scoy. The school of medicine then merged with the University of Oregon in 1913 and is now Oregon Health and Science University.

In December 1941, the institution's football team traveled to Hawaii to play the University of Hawaiʻi. Many students accompanied the team by passenger ship to Oahu. The game was played on December 6. The following day, many of the Willamette students witnessed the attack on Pearl Harbor from their hotels on Waikiki Beach. Their return trip was delayed by many weeks, and some of the students returned to Oregon by helping on ships transporting the wounded to the mainland. Many of the team members stayed with football players from Punahou School.

During World War II, Willamette was one of 131 colleges and universities nationally that took part in the V-12 Navy College Training Program which offered students a path to a Navy commission. Lausanne Hall, previously a women's residence, served as a "ship" for trainees between 1943 and 1945.

In 1965, Willamette and the Tokyo International University entered a sister-college relationship. The Tokyo International University in America, on Willamette University's campus, was completed in 1989.

Elizabeth Heaston, of the class of 1999, became the first female to play in a collegiate football game in 1997. In 2013, the Willamette community broke the world record for largest game of Red Light/Green Light with 1,060 players, and reclaimed the record in August 2015, with 1,203 players.

In September 2020, Willamette announced that it would merge with the Pacific Northwest College of Art. It finalized the merger on June 30, 2021. Willamette also attempted to merge with the Claremont School of Theology starting from 2017, but was blocked by a California court ruling in 2021. In December 2025, Willamette signed a letter of intent to merge with Pacific University. If completed, the combined institution would be the largest independent private university in Oregon.

== Campus ==
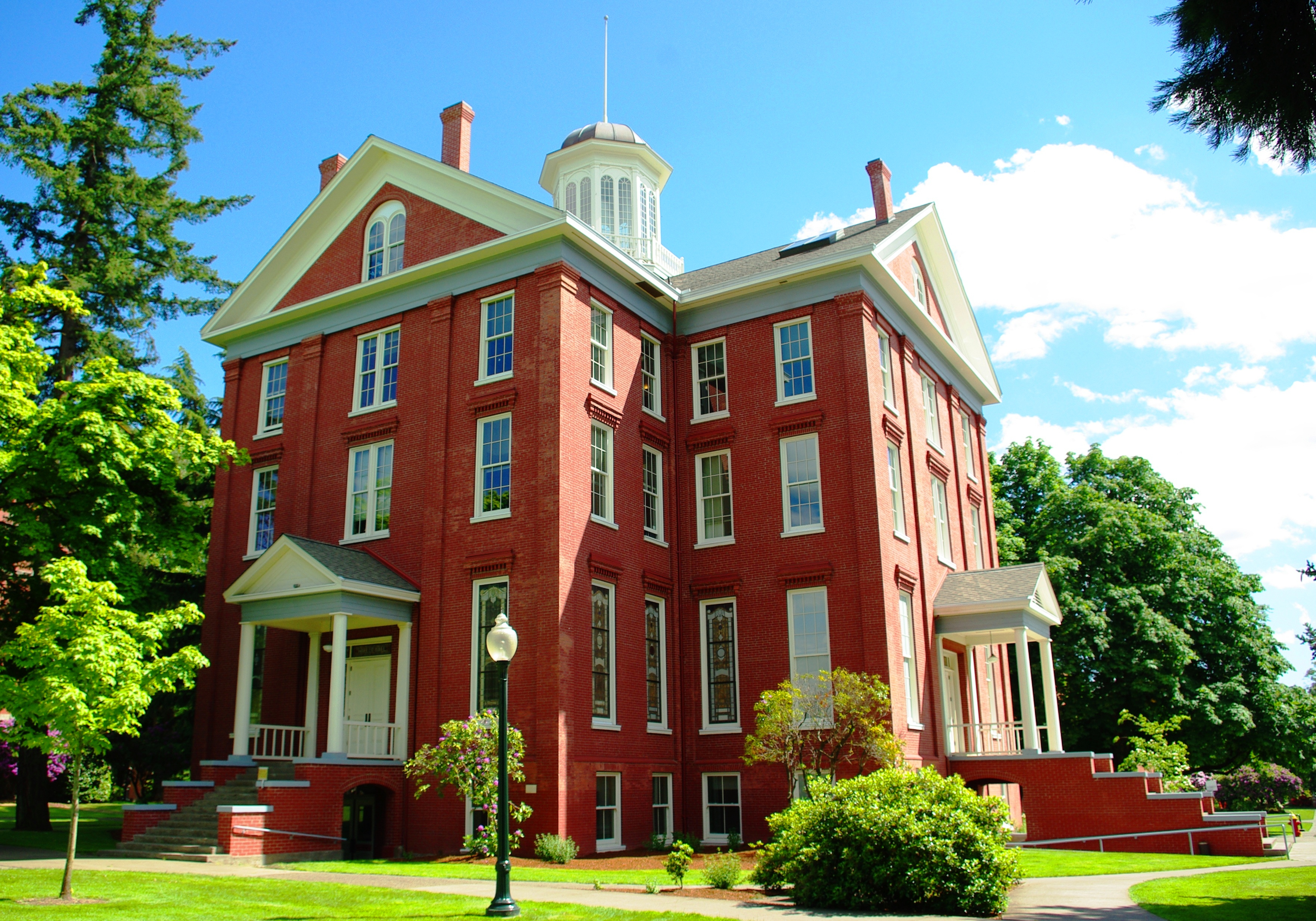
Waller Hall, completed in 1867 is the oldest building on campus.

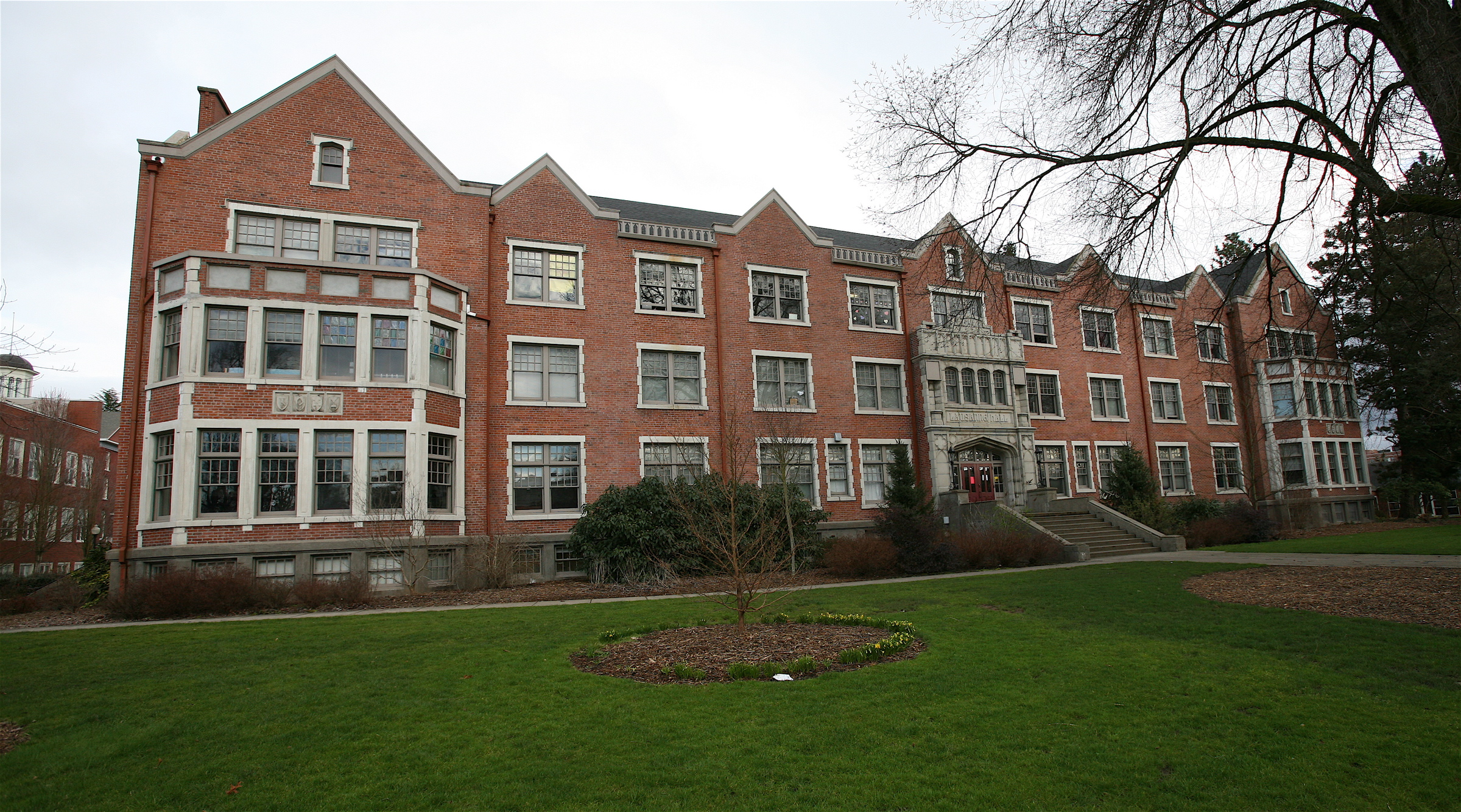
Lausanne Hall

The 69-acre (28 ha) Salem campus is directly south of the Oregon State Capitol, affording students access to internships in the institutions of Oregon government. Much of downtown Salem, including the Capitol, is on land once owned by the college. Railroad tracks are located directly east of the institution, with the Salem Amtrak Station near the southeastern edge of campus. South of the school is Salem Hospital, with Bush's Pasture Park and the school's McCulloch Stadium opposite the hospital.

Willamette's core area in Salem lies between State Street on the north, Bellevue Street on the south, Winter Street to the west, and 12th Street on the east. On the west side of Winter Street lie the university's graduate programs in business and law. Additional properties outside of the core area are the Hallie Ford Museum of Art, the Oregon Civic Justice Center, the Tokyo International University of America campus, and several residential buildings. Willamette owns several other properties along State Street west of the main campus. The institution plans to redevelop portions of the west end of campus to better tie the campus to downtown Salem.

Academic buildings on campus include Eaton Hall and Smullin/Walton Hall, which are primarily used by humanities departments. Science classes are generally held in the Collins and Olin buildings. Willamette's music program is housed by the G. Herbert Smith Auditorium and Fine Arts building, as well as the Mary Stuart Rogers Music Center. Administrative offices are found in the Putnam University Center and Waller Hall, Willamette's oldest building. Waller Hall was built using bricks made of clay from the campus quad. Willamette's newest buildings, including the Goudy Commons, Kaneko Commons (a residential college opened in the Fall of 2006), and Rogers Music Center have all been designed by the Zimmer Gunsul Frasca Architects. Ford Hall, near Gatke Hall on State Street, is a new academic building completed in the Fall of 2009.

In addition to Greek housing, eleven residence halls exist on the Willamette campus. Undergraduate students are under contract to live on campus for two years, after which they may move into private residences or one of the university's apartment complexes. Lausanne Hall, originally home of the university's Women's College, is now one of the university's undergraduate dormitories. The building commemorates the ship that brought the reinforcements to Lee in 1839. York Hall commemorates the university's first graduate.

The portion of Mill Creek's artificial millrace that runs through the middle of the campus is known as the Mill Stream. The millrace is diverted from Mill Creek at Waller Dam near 19th and Ferry streets. On the Willamette campus, it passes by the Martha Springer Botanical Garden, the Hatfield Library, Hudson Hall, the University Center, Smith Auditorium, and Goudy Commons. It forms a "W" shape when viewed from the University Center. Biology and environmental science classes use the Mill Stream as an authentic research venue. As part of the freshman matriculation ceremony, new students place a lit candle into the Mill Stream and watch it float downstream. The millrace connects with Pringle Creek near Salem City Hall.

On-campus athletics facilities are located in the southeast portion of the campus. These include a soccer field, tennis courts, and the Sparks Center. Softball, football, and baseball stadiums are located outside of the main campus.

== Academics ==
Academic rankings

Liberal arts
- U.S. News & World Report: 72
- Washington Monthly: 45

National
- Forbes: 213
- WSJ/College Pulse: 141

=== Undergraduate admissions ===
For the Class of 2026 (enrolling fall 2022), Willamette received 3,993 applications, admitted 3,218, and enrolled 537 students. For the freshmen who enrolled, the average high school weighted grade point average was 3.96.

For the 2022–2023 academic year, tuition, housing, and fee charges were $65,047. Willamette awarded about $30.2 million in need-based aid to its students in 2015, with the average financial aid package equal to $35,204. In terms of merit-based aid, the majority of Willamette scholarships and grants are awarded to students with demonstrated financial need.

Willamette University is a Common Application-exclusive school and is test-optional. All students who apply for admission are automatically considered for merit-based scholarships, which start at $22,000 per year. The university accepts the FAFSA to determine financial aid packages.

=== Curriculum ===
Willamette College (previously known as the College of Arts and Sciences) offers 33 majors, 38 minors and eight special programs The most popular undergraduate majors, by number out of 393 graduates in 2022, were:

- Economics (40)
- Psychology (33)
- Biology/Biological Sciences (30)
- Environmental Science (28)
- Political Science and Government (24)
- Exercise Science and Kinesiology (23)

Learning takes place both in and outside of the classroom. For example, students earn credit as political interns at the Oregon State Capitol, across the street from campus; study the effects of climate change at the nearby research forest; or conduct epidemiology surveys for the local health department.

Students in service-learning courses base papers and projects on their community service experience, and more than half of Willamette's undergraduate students study abroad, choosing from programs in 40 countries. Co-located with Tokyo International University of America, Willamette offers opportunities for students interested in Japanese language and culture, and connections to Asia and the Pacific Rim.

Carson Grants offer undergraduates the opportunity to undertake a scholarly, creative, or professional research project during the summer, and the Lilly Project provides grants, internships and programs to help students discern their "calling in life" and create meaningful professional paths. Sustainability mini-grants also provide students with opportunities to initiate contributions to campus sustainability efforts. Five academic Centers of Excellence provide opportunities for student-faculty collaboration and research. Eleven faculty members have been named Oregon Professor of the Year by the Council for Advancement and Support of Education (CASE) since 1990.

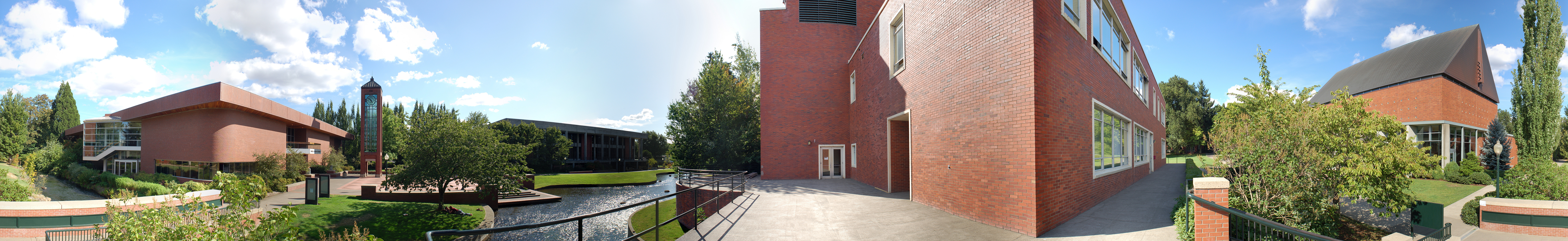
The grounds of Willamette University. Visible are the Mark O. Hatfield Library, the clock tower, and the Mill Stream that runs through the campus.

=== Pacific Northwest College of Art ===
The Pacific Northwest College of Art is the university's art school in Portland, Oregon. It was established in 1909 and merged with Willamette in 2021. The college has 10 Bachelor of Fine Arts majors and five graduate programs, a dual-degree MA/MFA option, and a Post-Baccalaureate program within its Hallie Ford School of Graduate Studies.

=== Graduate programs ===
The university has three graduate-level schools. The School of Law is the oldest and largest of the programs and is located exclusively in Salem, with the Atkinson Graduate School of Management and School of Computing and Information Sciences located in both Salem and Portland, Oregon. The College of Education at Willamette closed in 2014. Atkinson and the School of Law offer a joint-degree program that allows students to earn both a Master of Business Administration and Juris Doctor. Students can also earn an Master of Business Administration and Master's in Data Science at the same time. Pacific Northwest College of Art is also home to the Hallie Ford School of Graduate Studies, focused on delivering MFA and MA degrees in art and design.

=== Continuing education programs ===
The Executive Development Center at Willamette University offers continuing education in management. It is housed within the Atkinson Graduate School of Management and offers certificates.

== Campus life ==
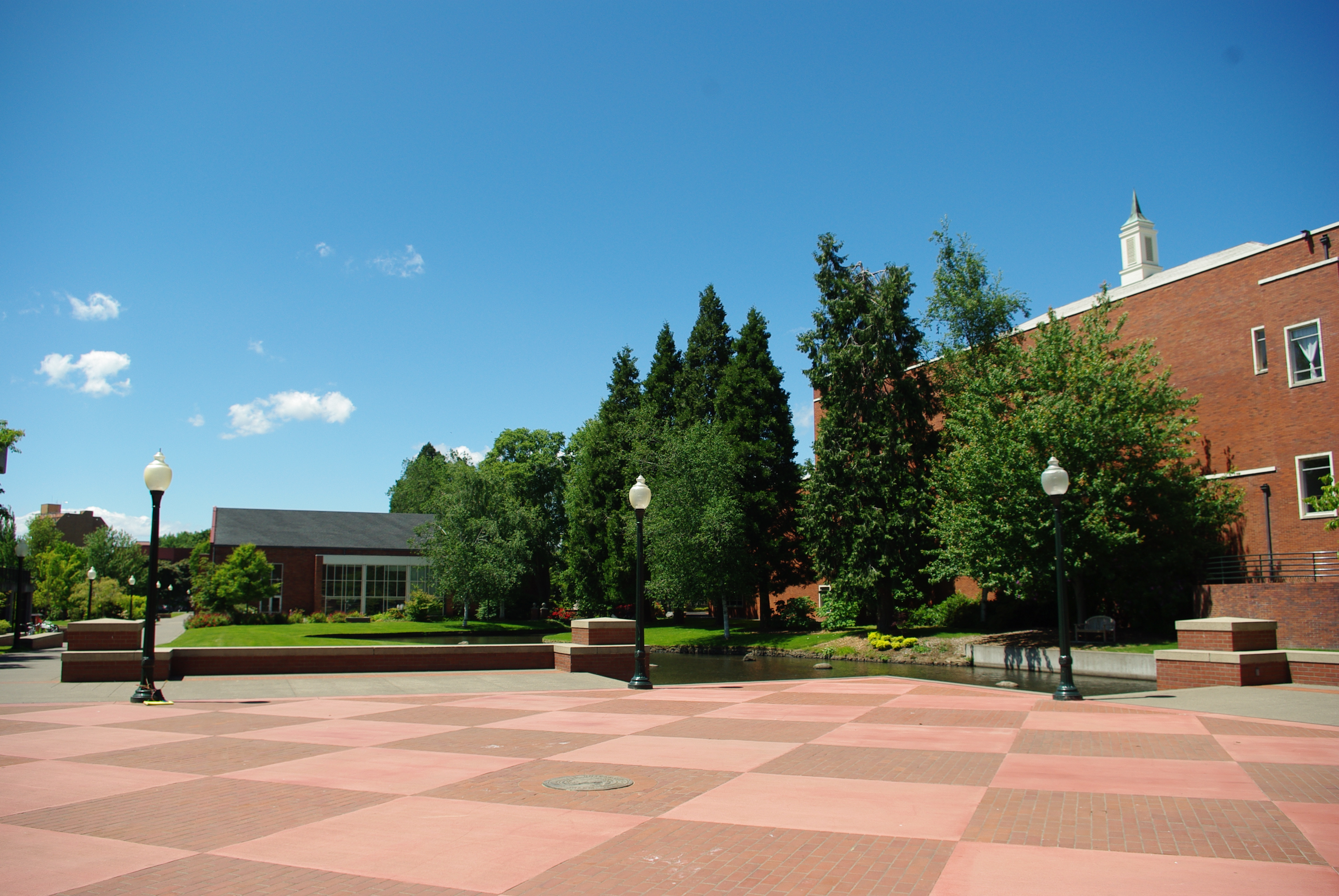
Jackson Plaza outside the library

The institution's weekly newspaper, the Willamette Collegian, began publishing in 1875. It also has over 100 student organizations ranging from sport clubs, political groups, and social clubs to religious groups and honor societies. Willamette University has many active club and intramural sports on its campus, including rugby, poi spinning, ultimate frisbee, basketball, and others. The Outdoor Program organizes around 120 trips each year, and more than half of students participate in trips like kayaking, camping, skiing, hiking, whale-watching, and more.

=== Greek life ===
There are two fraternities and two sororities at Willamette. The sororities are Alpha Chi Omega and Alpha Phi. The fraternities are Kappa Sigma and Sigma Chi.

Greek life at Willamette began in the 1920s. In 1942, G. Herbert Smith, a member of Beta Theta Pi, became President of Willamette, and invited more fraternities and sororities onto campus. Pi Beta Phi became the first national sorority at Willamette in 1944, and Beta Theta Pi, Sigma Chi, and Phi Delta Theta were installed in 1947.

Chi Omega was transformed into a multicultural oriented residence known as WISH (Willamette International Studies House). Pi Beta Phi closed in 2021. In the spring of 2014, Alpha Phi accepted an invitation from the university's Panhellenic Council to reorganize their chapter on Willamette's campus. In the fall of 2014, Beta Theta Pi began recolonization of its chapter on Willamette's campus with the consent of the university's Inter-Fraternity council.

Greek life at Willamette came under national scrutiny in 2013 when Facebook messages from one fraternity, Sigma Chi, were leaked. The messages were sexist in nature and included demands for Sigma Chi brothers to "invite any girl who has a pulse" to an upcoming party and that "women's [sic] rights are the biggest joke in the US." The messages included sexually threatening language about a Willamette administrator. The fraternity lost its house and was forced to move off campus. Sigma Chi's National Executive Director Mike Dunn said that the fraternity "completely support[s] what the school has done." Twelve members of the fraternity were punished by being forced to leave the group. In the aftermath, Rolling Stone Magazine ranked Sigma Chi at Willamette fifth on its list of "The Most Out of Control Fraternities in America".

== Athletics ==
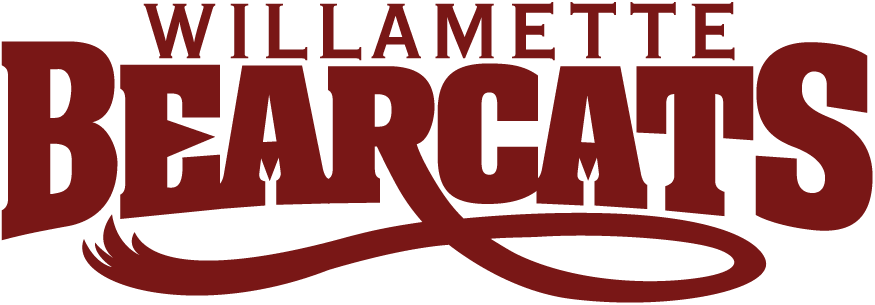
Willamette athletics wordmark

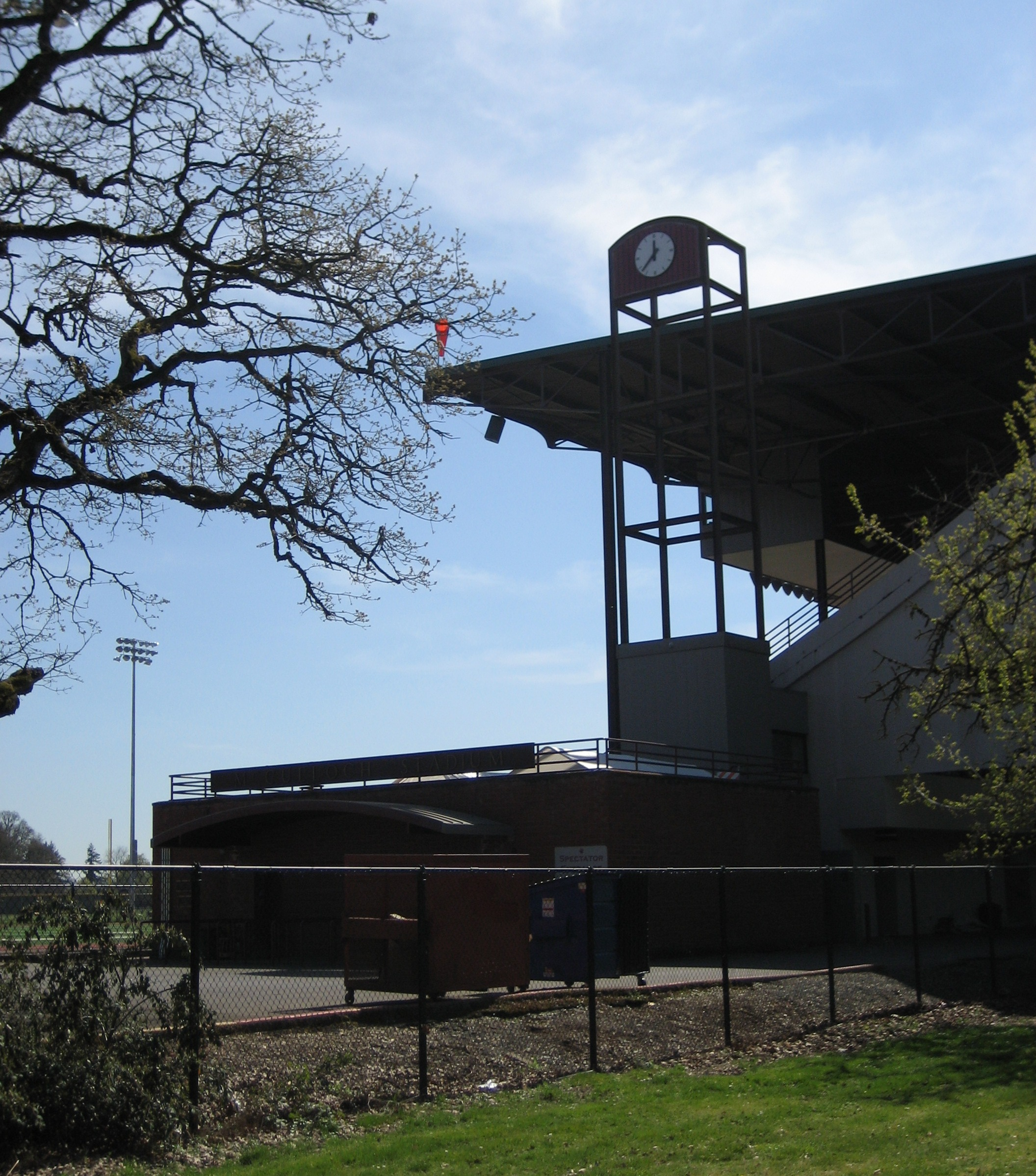
McCulloch Stadium, football venue

The Willamette athletics teams, nicknamed the Bearcats, compete at the NCAA Division III level in the Northwest Conference. Their main rival is Linfield University, with both schools being in the same conference since 1926. The school moved from the National Association of Intercollegiate Athletics (NAIA) to the NCAA Division III level in 1996. Willamette fields teams in baseball, basketball, cross-country, golf, football, soccer, softball, swimming, tennis, track & field, lacrosse, women's triathlon program, and volleyball.

Willamette is a founding member of the Northwest Conference league. The football team plays home games at McCulloch Stadium south of the main campus, while basketball, swimming, and volleyball teams use the Lestle J. Sparks Center for home events. At or adjacent to McCulloch are the Charles Bowles Track used for track meets and Roy S. "Spec" Keene Stadium where baseball plays its home games. Notable football coaches include Dan Hawkins, Mark Speckman, and Jerry Frei.

In 1991, the institution started the Willamette University Athletic Hall of Fame. In 1993, the school earned its first team sport national championship when the men's basketball team earned the NAIA Division 2 title. In 2017, the Willamette Men's Soccer team won their first NCAA division III title.

=== Notable athletic accomplishments and event ===
On December 7, 1941, Willamette's football team was in Honolulu, Hawaii, for the Shrine Bowl when Japanese forces attacked Pearl Harbor. Team members and fans who had made the trip volunteered for 10 days following the attack as guards at Punahou School and nurses at a U.S. Navy hospital. The 1941 team, known today on Willamette's campus as "the Pearl Harbor Football Team", was inducted into the Willamette University Athletic Hall of Fame in 1997.

In 1997, Liz Heaston became the first woman to play in a college football game when the Bearcats beat rival Linfield College. She kicked two extra points in the game. Also that year, the football team finished its best season losing in the NAIA National Championship game to the University of Findlay 14–7. In 2007, Sarah Zerzan won the NCAA Division III title in cross country.

As an undergraduate, Olympian Nick Symmonds won the 800 NCAA championship race all four years and the 1,500 NCAA championship race as a freshman, junior, and senior. Symmonds later went on to place fifth in the 800-meter run at the 2012 Olympic Games. In 2014, Conner Mertens became the first active college football player to come out about his bisexuality. Mertens generated international headlines when he publicly addressed being bisexual.

== Notable alumni ==
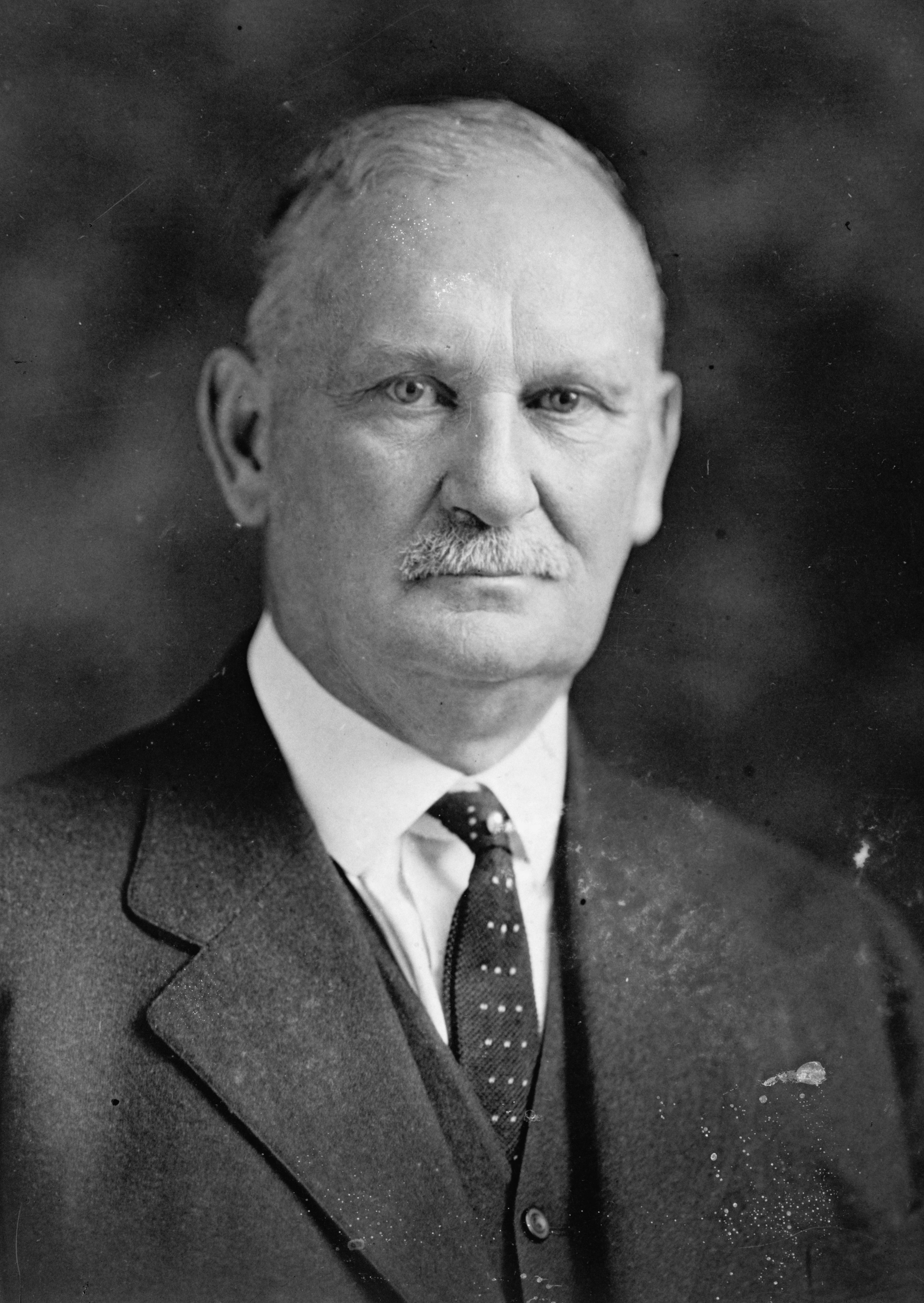
Willis C. Hawley

Notable alumni from Willamette include a range of people involved in business, government, education, science, sports, art and entertainment.

Perhaps the most notable Willamette graduate is Dale T. Mortensen, the 2010 winner of the Nobel Prize in Economics.

Business leaders include James Albaugh, president and CEO of Boeing Integrated Defense Systems, and Alex J. Mandl, the executive chairman of digital security company Gemalto. Those in the arts include Marie Watt, a contemporary artist whose work centers on Native American themes.

Thomas A. Bartlett, president of American University in Cairo attended Willamette for two years before completing his bachelor of arts at Stanford University. In his career, he has served as president of the Association of American Universities, president of Colgate University and chairman of the board of trustees of the United States–Japan Foundation. Another alum involved in the education arena is Norma Paulus. Paulus served as Oregon's superintendent of public instruction. Prior to this, she was the first woman to hold statewide elected office in Oregon as secretary of state.

Government officials who have graduated from Willamette include members from both the judicial and legislative branches of government. Oregon Supreme Court's first Hispanic American chief justice, Paul De Muniz, graduated from the College of Law, as did his predecessor, Wallace P. Carson, Jr. Recent Oregon State Supreme Court justice Virginia Linder also received her Juris Doctor from Willamette. California Democratic congressman Sam Farr who served from 1993 through 2017, successfully introduced the 2007 "Oceans Conservation, Education and National Strategy for the 21st Century Act." He attended Willamette for his undergraduate studies. Mark O. Hatfield, Oregon's former governor and the longest serving Oregon senator, graduated from Willamette and later returned as a professor at his alma mater. Bob Packwood, former Republican senator graduated from Willamette University in 1954. Robert Freeman Smith, a Republican, was a state House member from 1960–1972, then served as a United States Congressman from Oregon's 2nd congressional district from 1983 to 1995. After a brief retirement, he returned to Congress in 1997, for a single term. Washington Governor Jay Inslee earned his J.D. degree from Willamette University. Lisa Murkowski, a Republican senator from Alaska, also received her J.D. from Willamette University College of Law.

Notable alumni in science include Gerald L. Pearson (Physics 1926) and Daryl Chapin (Physics 1927), who were co-inventors of the silicon solar cell at AT&T Bell Laboratories in 1954.

Notable alumni involved in athletics include Cal Lee, linebackers coach for the University of Hawaiʻi football team, who graduated from Willamette in 1970. A graduate of the class of 1999, Liz Heaston, made history at Willamette as the first woman to play and score in a men's NAIA college football game in 1997. Tony Barron was a Major League Baseball player who played for the Montreal Expos from 1995–1996 and the Philadelphia Phillies in 1997. Nick Symmonds won seven NCAA Division III 800-meter championships during his undergraduate years at Willamette before going on to win the 2008 Olympic Track and Field Trials.
