= Jason Lee (missionary) =

Canadian missionary (1803–1845)

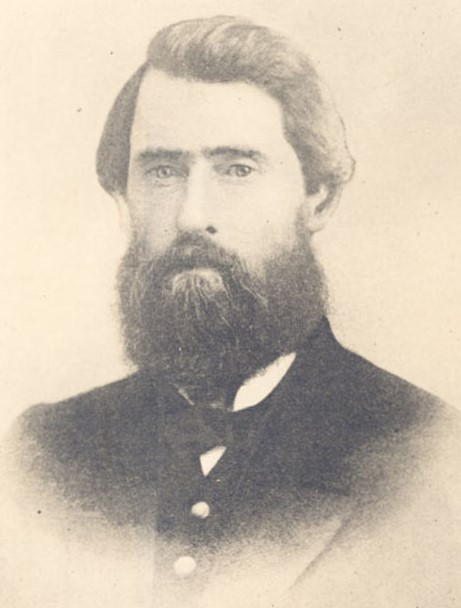
- Born: June 28, 1803; Stanstead, Quebec
- Died: March 12, 1845 (aged 41); Stanstead, Quebec
- Spouse(s): Anna Maria Pittman (d. 1838); Lucy Thompson

Ecclesiastical career
- Church: Methodist Episcopal Church
- Title: Superintendent of the Oregon Mission

Jason Lee (June 28, 1803 – March 12, 1845) was a Canadian Methodist Episcopalian missionary and pioneer in the Pacific Northwest. He was born on a farm near Stanstead, Quebec.

After a group of Nez Perce and Bitterroot Salish men journeyed to St. Louis requesting the Book of Heaven in 1831 (their people had heard of it years before), Lee and his nephew Daniel Lee volunteered to serve as missionaries for them. Both were appointed as missionaries by the church, given orders to open and maintain a mission among the Salish. At the time, the Pacific Northwest was "jointly occupied" by the United Kingdom and the United States as agreed to in the Treaty of 1818. The missionaries went overland in 1834 with Nathaniel Jarvis Wyeth, an American merchant who previously visited the Columbia River basin to enter the regional fur trade market. The party of priests and fur trappers arrived at Fort Vancouver later that year and were greeted by Chief Factor John McLoughlin. While there, McLoughlin influenced Jason Lee to open the station among the Kalapuya in the Willamette Valley rather than the Salish.

Jason Lee was the first of the Oregon missionaries and instrumental in the American settlement in the Oregon Country.

== Early life ==
Jason Lee was the youngest of fourteen siblings. At the age of 13 Lee was self-supporting, converted to Methodism at 23 and later attended the Wilbraham Wesleyan Academy. While studying there, he became friends with Osman Baker and graduated in 1830. Between 1830 and 1832 he was minister in the Stanstead area and taught school. Lee had applied to the London-based Wesleyan Missionary Society to proselytize to the First Nations of Canada but his application wasn't processed as Richard Watson, the secretary, had died.

== Missionary ==
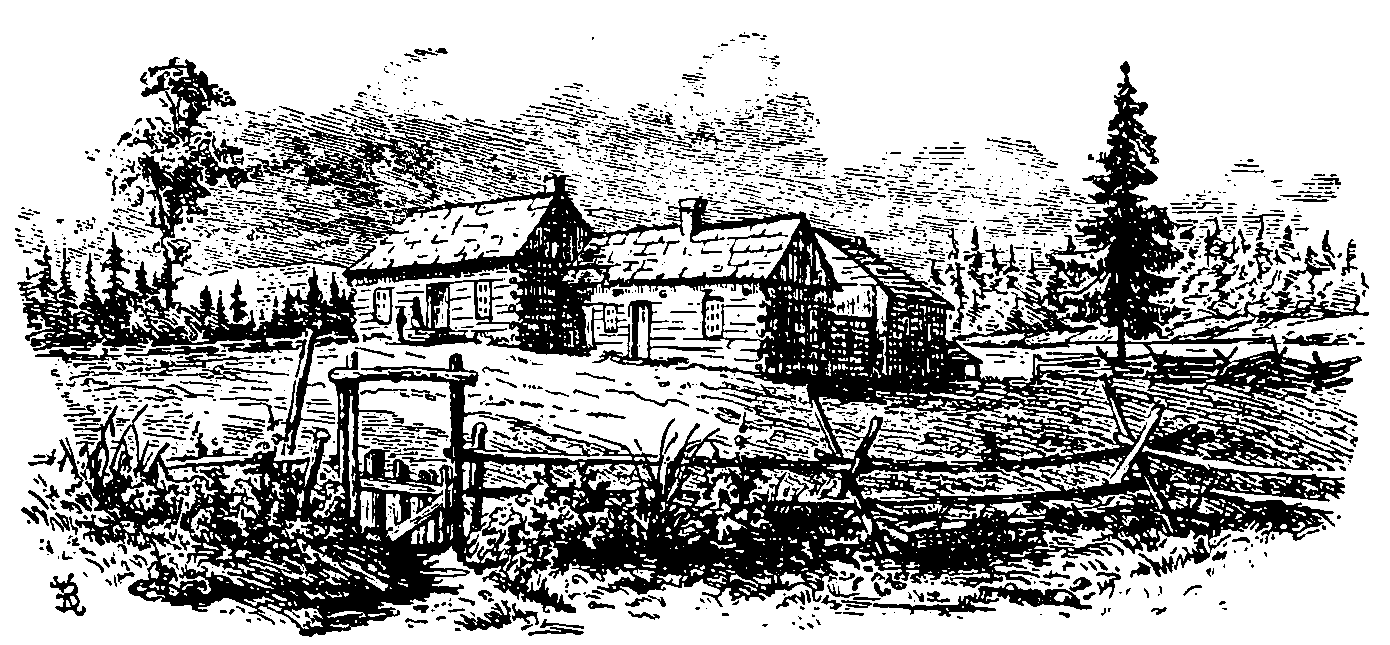
Jason Lee's mission in 1834

In 1832, four men of the Nez Perce and Bitterroot Salish or Flathead tribe journeyed to St. Louis and requested from resident William Clark for someone to bring the "Book of Heaven", prophesied in a vision, to the Salish people. An account was editorialized by the Christian Advocate and Journal the subsequent year, calling upon its readers to send preachers to the Rocky Mountains and beyond. The article quickly was given the attention of Willbur Fisk, President of the Wesleyan University, who tabled a proposal for the Methodist Church to establish a presence among the Salish. Jason Lee, a former student of Fisk, and his nephew Daniel volunteered for service in the planned mission among the Flathead Indians.

Arrangements were made with Nathaniel Wyeth for the small missionary group to travel with his party. In early 1834 the combined group departed from Independence, Missouri. Lee didn't refrain from judging and comparing the various native cultures along the Columbia River basin while en route west. He found the Walla Walla in particular "far more filthy and indolent than the Kioos Cayuse." The close to two thousand mile trek ended at the Hudson's Bay Company's (HBC) fur trading station of Fort Vancouver, where the missionaries wintered. During their stay there Chief Factor John McLoughlin advised against creating a mission in interior Flathead land and instead recommended the nearby Willamette Valley. Lee eventually settled on a location northwest of the present site of Salem, Oregon. There he found about a dozen French-Canadian settlers who previously had been employed by the HBC, in addition to their native wives and children.

=== Conversion efforts ===
Over time the superintendent began to request additional missionaries and laymen be sent to relieve him of temporal duties. This view was shared by Daniel Lee and later missionaries, all of whom complained of having to spend too much time away from conversion efforts. Additionally Lee downplayed the accounts from fellow priests by proclaiming that hundreds of natives had become Methodists. It wasn't until the arrival of George Abernethy in 1840 that Lee was finally allowed to focus solely on proselyting to indigenous peoples.

Lee also highlighted that the indigenous populations were on the decline from disease in 1836: "unless the God of heaven undertake their cause, they must perish from off the face of the Earth, and their name blotted out from under heaven." This became a typical view of Lee despite his continued conversion efforts. According to his biographer Cornelius J. Brosnan, Lee saw "Oregon as the home of a future white civilization" as early as 1837 while back in New York. In a letter addressed to the Methodist Missionary Board he beseeched for agriculturalists. Lee felt that because "this country will settle ere long," if the board were to send "a few good, pious settlers" then "an incalculable benefit" would benefit "generations yet unborn."

=== Marriage to Anna Maria Pittman ===
In the summer of 1837, missionary Anna Maria Pittman arrived at Lee's mission to assist him. It had been suggested to Lee that he might marry Pittman, but at first he was not interested, finding her unattractive. After getting to know Pittman better, Lee changed his mind, writing, "I at length became convinced that she was eminently qualified to do all the duties and kind offices of an affectionate companion, and was worthy of my highest regards, esteem, and love". Lee and Pittman were married on July 16, 1837.

== Political activities ==
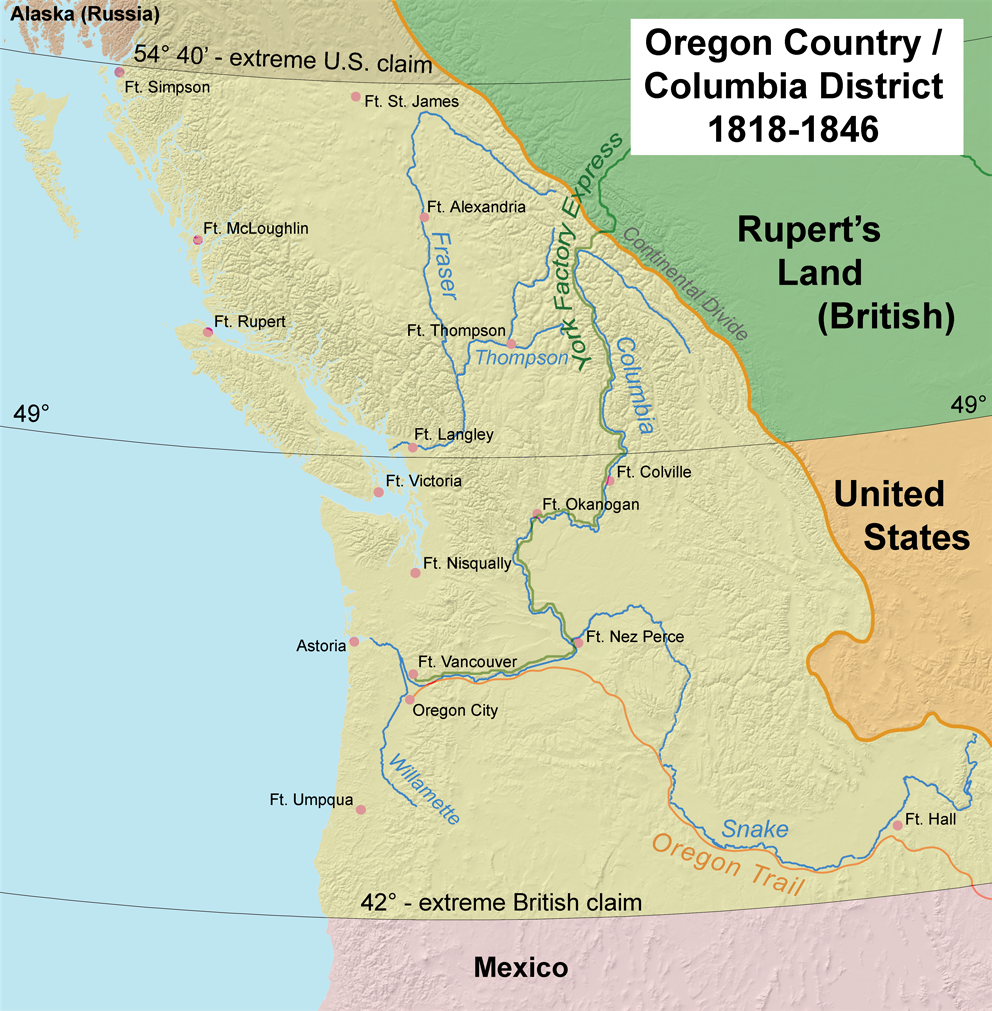
Oregon Country

=== Temperance efforts ===
Lee formed the Oregon Temperance Society in 1836, composed of lay members of the Mission and former HBC employees. Blocked out of the local fur trade by the HBC, pioneer Ewing Young began plans to create an alcohol distillery for sale to natives. Once this became known to the Society its members were mobilized into action. In a letter signed by residents of the valley, Young was requested to refrain from opening the distillery and offered to cover the costs of forfeiting the venture. Young blamed the HBC for "tyranizing oppression" and the situation he was in but nonetheless agreed to forfeit production of alcohol without compensation.

=== Willamette Cattle Company ===
The first representative from the United States to visit the Methodist station was Navy Lieutenant William A. Slacum on board the Loriot. John McLoughlin welcomed the naval official and informed Jason Lee of his arrival, who met Slacum at Champoeg in January. A common topic Slacum had with French-Canadian and American settlers residing in the Willamette Valley was about livestock. All the cattle residing in Oregon at the time was then owned by the HBC. Despite this, McLoughlin authorized the loaning out of livestock as needed to missionaries and settlers. To resolve this pressing issue, Slacum suggested that cattle from Alta California be purchased. The Willamette Cattle Company was formed and the Loriot gave passage to Young and other men to California. Returning overland with a herd of 600 livestock, the portion for Lee and the Mission bestowed a sound means of nutritional self-sufficiency.

=== Promoting a settler authority ===
Ewing Young became the center of attention of the Willamette Valley farmsteads once again with his death and his extensive estate, which had no heirs to claim it in 1841. Several meetings were held and Lee chaired the first one where he put forth a proposal for a singular jurisdiction for all inhabitants south of the Columbia river. This was the culmination of feuds with Vicar General Blanchet who had till then dispensed justice on the Catholic population of the Willamette Valley. Blanchet was accused by Lee of splitting the settler community by refusing to submit to the attempted civic authority. This attempt was aimed at cutting the financially supportive relationship and patronage the HBC gave the Catholic Missionaries. By removing the political control over Catholics, the Company would lose influence among the settlers. An additional motive was that the Oregon Mission was in debt to the Company. These were the roots of Lee's support for a government in 1841, rather than finding a local regime necessary in and of itself.

At the time of the Champoeg Meetings Lee was no longer an active participant of the political activities in the valley. By this point, according to Brosnan, "Jason Lee's political acumen made him realize that a local provisional government was not the direction where lay Oregon's true interest." Abernethy joined Lee in criticizing the Champoeg Meetings and their developments as unnecessary.

== 1838 trip east ==
The delays in communication with the Board of Managers back in the United States eventually necessitated Lee to return there to give a more thorough description of the activities of the Mission. Prior to leaving he was influential in the propagation of a memorial by many residents of the Willamette Valley addressing the United States Congress. The document requested that the American government establish rule over the regions of the Oregon Country south of the Columbia River and highlighted the potentials of trade with Asia and the Pacific. Besides gathering funds for missionary work, Lee apparently left for the east as he had a "desire to promote" Oregon as a worthwhile place for colonization. Lee spent three weeks at the interior ABCFM missions run by Marcus Whitman and Henry H. Spalding while waiting for an escort from the HBC. Viewing the growing farms maintained by the Cayuse and Nez Perce, Jason considered them both "superior to those upon the Willamette [River] ..." despite the occasional whipping by the two missionaries.

After giving birth to their child, Lee's wife, Anna Maria Pittman Lee, died in June. The child, a boy, died a few days after birth. News of his wife and son's deaths reached Lee more than two months later as he entered Missouri. Lee soon remarried to Lucy Thompson Grubbs.

While traveling through Illinois, Lee convinced John P. Richmond to join him in Oregon. Richmond was later appointed as the head of the Nisqually Mission in modern Washington. While in Peoria he held a speech on Oregon that enthralled some locals who formed the Peoria Party to attempt to colonize Oregon. At a meeting with the Missionary Board in November the Board approved his plan for the creation of recruiting laymen such as blacksmiths and mechanics, the creation of grist mill, and expansion of agricultural production. After the memorial arrived in Washington, D.C. it was presented to Congress by Senator Lewis F. Linn in January 1839. In correspondence with Representative Caleb Cushing Lee noted that if America were to control the area many of the laymen of the Mission would in time become permanent settlers, which did eventually occur as predicted. During his time in the United States Lee went on several speaking tours throughout the nation along with a visit to his hometown in Canada to raise funds for the mission. Despite his position that only two additional preachers were needed, the Board recruited five. Lee and the "great reinforcement" sailed aboard the Lausanne and arrived in Oregon on 1 June 1840.

== Dismissal ==
Letters were sent to the Board of Managers from Elijah White, John P. Richmond, and Gustavus Hines attacking the leadership of Lee for several years. Conflict with White, who previously managed the mission financial records, had been a source of discontent for years. White was accused by Lee of having spent money at Fort Vancouver on the account of the mission. Rather than show his records, White left for the United States in 1841. While David Leslie gave the superintendent a positive appraisal, it wasn't enough to counter the years of criticisms. Reports held Lee accountable for a general neglect and disinterest in converting Indigenous peoples. Additionally, Lee's inability to provide a complete financial history of the Willamette Mission and its subsidiary stations proved to be too much for the Board. They appointed Rev. George Gray as the new superintendent and instructed him to dispose of the temporal properties of the Mission, including the grist mill and missions not actively used.

After hearing the news that he was ejected as the superintendent from Marcus Whitman, who had recently returned from the United States, Lee went to meet the Board in person to defend himself. Crossing Mexico and sailing up the Mississippi River, Lee reached New York City on 27 May 1844. He found the leadership debating over slavery, which soon led to a schism and the formation of the Methodist Episcopal Church, South. In the meantime, Lee went to Washington, D.C., and had conferences with both President John Tyler and Senator Thomas H. Benton to present the land claims of the Oregon Mission. When finally meeting with the Board leadership Lee was able to rectify his position, but he wasn't reappointed as superintendent. He opted to raise money for the Oregon Institute, (now Willamette University), a school he helped organize. However, while visiting his sister in Stanstead, his health failed, and he died on 12 March 1845. His remains were reinterred at the Lee Mission Cemetery in Salem, Oregon in 1906 alongside the remains of his two wives and infant daughter.

== Legacy ==
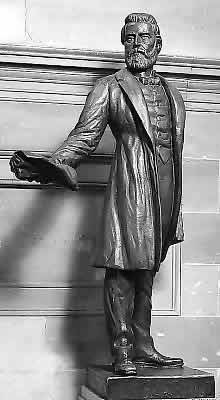
Jason Lee NSHC statue

The house Lee occupied in 1841 is preserved as part of the Willamette Heritage Center, formerly known as the Mission Mill Museum.

In 1953, the State of Oregon donated a bronze statue of Lee to the U.S. Capitol's National Statuary Hall Collection. Another copy was installed on the grounds of the Oregon State Capitol in 1953, having been finished by Gifford MacGregor Proctor after the death of his father, sculptor Alexander Phimister Proctor.

Elementary schools in Richland, Washington, and a middle school in Vancouver, Washington are named after him. Portland, Oregon formerly had an elementary named after him.

== See also ==
- John McLoughlin
- Methodist Mission in Oregon
- William Taylor (bishop) -- Pioneer Methodist missionary in California

== Bibliography ==
- Atwood, A. (1907), The Conquerors, Cincinnati: Jennings and Graham
- Barclay, Wade Crawford (1950), Early American Methodism, New York City: Board of Missions and Church Extension of the Methodist Church
- Bashford, James W. (1918), The Oregon Missions, New York City: Abingdon Press
- Brosnan, Cornelius J. (1932), Jason Lee:Prophet of New Oregon, New York City: The MacMillan Co.
- Brosnan, Cornelius J. (1933), "The Oregon Memorial of 1838", Oregon Historical Quarterly, 34 (1): 68–77, JSTOR 20610776
- Carey, Charles H. (1922a), History of Oregon. Vol 1., Chicago: The Pioneer Historical Publishing Co.
- Carey, Charles H. (1922b), "The Mission Record Book of the Methodist Episcopal Church, Willamette Station, Oregon Territory, North America, Commenced 1834", The Quarterly of the Oregon Historical Society, 23 (3): 230–266, JSTOR 20610215
- Crawford, Medorum, ed. (1881), Transactions of the Eighth Annual Re-Union of the Oregon Pioneer Association, Salem, OR: E. M. Waite
- Crosby, Thomas (1907), Among the An-Ko-me-nums, Toronto: William Briggs
- Grubbs, F.H. (1906), Memorial services at re-interment of remains of Rev. Jason Lee, Memorial souvenir, Jason Lee, Salem, OR: s.n.
- Hines, Harvey K. (1899), Missionary History of the Pacific Northwest, Portland, OR: Marsh Printing Co.
- Himes, George H. (1919), "Beginnings of Christianity in Oregon", The Quarterly of the Oregon Historical Society, 20 (2): 159–172, JSTOR 20610131
- Holman, Frederick (1907), John McLoughlin: The Father of Oregon, Cleveland: A.H. Clark
- Holman, Frederick (1912), "A Brief History of the Oregon Provisional Government and What Caused Its Formation", The Quarterly of the Oregon Historical Society, 13 (2): 89–139, JSTOR 20609900
- Horner, John B. (1919), Oregon: Her History, Her Great Men, Her Literature, Portland: Press of the Gazette-Times, hdl:2027/mdp.39015027940942
- Lee, Daniel; Frost, Joseph H. (1844), Ten Years in Oregon, New York City: The MacMillan Co., ISBN 9780598285843
- Lee, Jason (1912), "Diary of Reverend Jason Lee – II (Continued)", The Quarterly of the Oregon Historical Society, 17 (3): 240–266
- Loewenberg, Robert J. (1976), Equality on the Oregon Frontier: Jason Lee and the Methodist Mission, 1834–1843, Seattle: University of Washington Press
- Slacum, William A.; Forsyth, John (1912), "Slacum's Report on Oregon, 1836–7", The Quarterly of the Oregon Historical Society, 13 (2): 175–224, JSTOR 20609903
- Sprague, William B. (1856), Annals of the American pulpit. Vol. VII, New York City: Robert Carter & Bros.
- Victor, Frances Fuller; Bancroft, Hubert Howe (1890), History of Oregon, Vol. 1 , San Francisco: History Co.
