= Oregon Institute =

19th-century school in United States

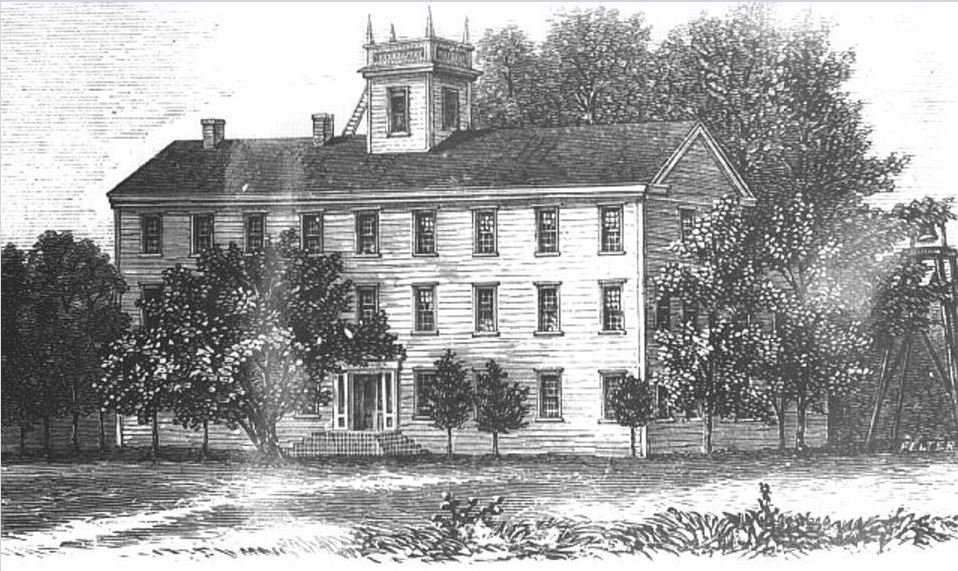
The original building of the Oregon Institute. Completed in 1844, the building was destroyed by fire in 1872.

The Oregon Institute was an American school located in the Willamette Valley of the Oregon Country during the 19th century. Begun in 1842, it was the first school built for European Americans west of Missouri. Founded by members of the Methodist Mission, it was located in what is now Salem, Oregon. The school began as a pre-college institution, but by 1853 was developed as Willamette University. The school's three-story building was a prominent feature in the early days of Oregon; it served as a meeting place for the Oregon Territorial Legislature when it first moved to Salem.

== Background ==
Missionary Jason Lee came to Oregon Country in 1834 with Nathaniel Jarvis Wyeth to begin missionary work amongst the natives. First Lee and his men built Mission Bottom north of present Salem, Oregon, but that was flooded in 1841. The Methodist Mission was relocated to Chemeketa Plain in what would later become Salem. After moving the mission, they began constructing a new building for the Indian Manual Labor School. Before the building was completed, the Methodist Mission was dissolved in 1844 and its assets sold.

On February 1, 1842, several missionaries, including Jason Lee, met at his house to discuss forming a school for the White settlers' children. The group decided to create a school, naming it the Oregon Institute. A building was begun on Wallace Prairie (in the area of the abandoned Wallace House) to the east of the Methodist Mission, but abandoned and sold before completion. For $4,000, the Oregon Institute bought the three-story building originally under construction for the Indian Manual Labor School, together with its land, in June 1844.

It was built under the supervision of Hamilton Campbell at a cost of $8,000 for the mission. Construction began in 1841 and finished in 1844. This building was 71 feet (22 m) long, 24 feet (7.3 m) wide, and three stories high. It was built of fir milled on site, except for the windows that came from New York. The building dominated the landscape in early Oregon.

== Functions ==
The first building of the school, a three-story wood building, was occupied in 1844. This building was used by the school and community, including the state legislature and court. Oregon Institute began with one teacher, who taught the white children of the area.

On February 1, 1843, the first "Wolf Meeting" was held at the Oregon Institute with Supreme Judge Ira L. Babcock, who at the time also governed the country, presiding, to discuss the issue of predatory animals in the Willamette Valley. This meeting was one of the precursors to the formation of the Provisional Government of Oregon at Champoeg in May.

In 1846 tuition was $24 annually and use of its dormitories cost $2 weekly. An American naval agent visited the institute during the same year found the school in a "languishing condition", its dormitories still incomplete. At the time there was only five enrolled male students.

In 1853 the school changed names to Wallamet University, later changed to the current Willamette.
