= Alvin F. Waller =

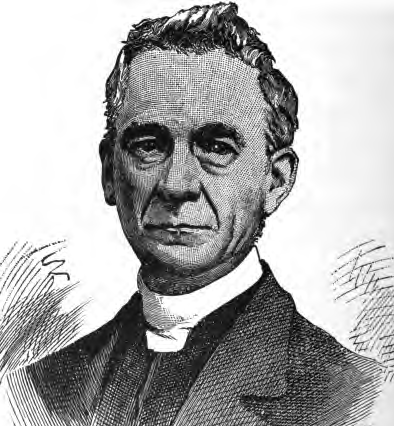
- Born: May 8, 1808; Abington, Pennsylvania
- Died: December 26, 1872 (aged 64); Salem, Oregon
- Occupation: preacher
- Employer: Methodist Mission
- Known for: Willamette University
- Spouse: Elpha White

Alvin F. Waller (1808–1872) was an American missionary in Oregon Country and an early leader at Willamette University in Salem, Oregon. He was a native of Pennsylvania and helped found the first Protestant church west of the Rocky Mountains in 1843 in Oregon City.

== Early life ==
Alvin Waller was born in Abington, Pennsylvania, on May 8, 1808. He was ordained as a Methodist minister and preached on the East Seaboard of the United States. There he married Elpha White in 1833, and they would have five children. In 1839, Waller was recruited by Oregon missionary Jason Lee to join his mission in the Willamette Valley. Waller sailed for Oregon in October 1839 aboard the Lausanne and arrived in Oregon in May 1840 as part of the Methodist Mission's "Great Reinforcement" that included other such as Ira L. Babcock, George Abernethy, Josiah Lamberson Parrish, and Gustavus Hines.

== Oregon ==
Once in Oregon Waller was assigned to start a new branch of the main mission at the falls on the Willamette River. There with the assistance of Lee the Willamette Falls Methodist Mission was established in 1840. The land claim came into conflict with that of the Hudson's Bay Company at that site, so Doctor John McLoughlin of the HBC took a personal land claim at the site. In 1844, McLoughlin and Waller settled the disputed land claims with Waller and the Methodists receiving townlots, $500, and 5 acres (20,000 m^{2}) from McLoughlin.

In 1842, he helped to build the Methodist church at the falls in what became Oregon City, Oregon. Finished in 1844, the church was the first Protestant church west of the Rocky Mountains. In 1844, after the main mission at Salem was closed, Waller was reassigned to the Wascopam Mission to replace Daniel Lee and H. K. W. Perkins.

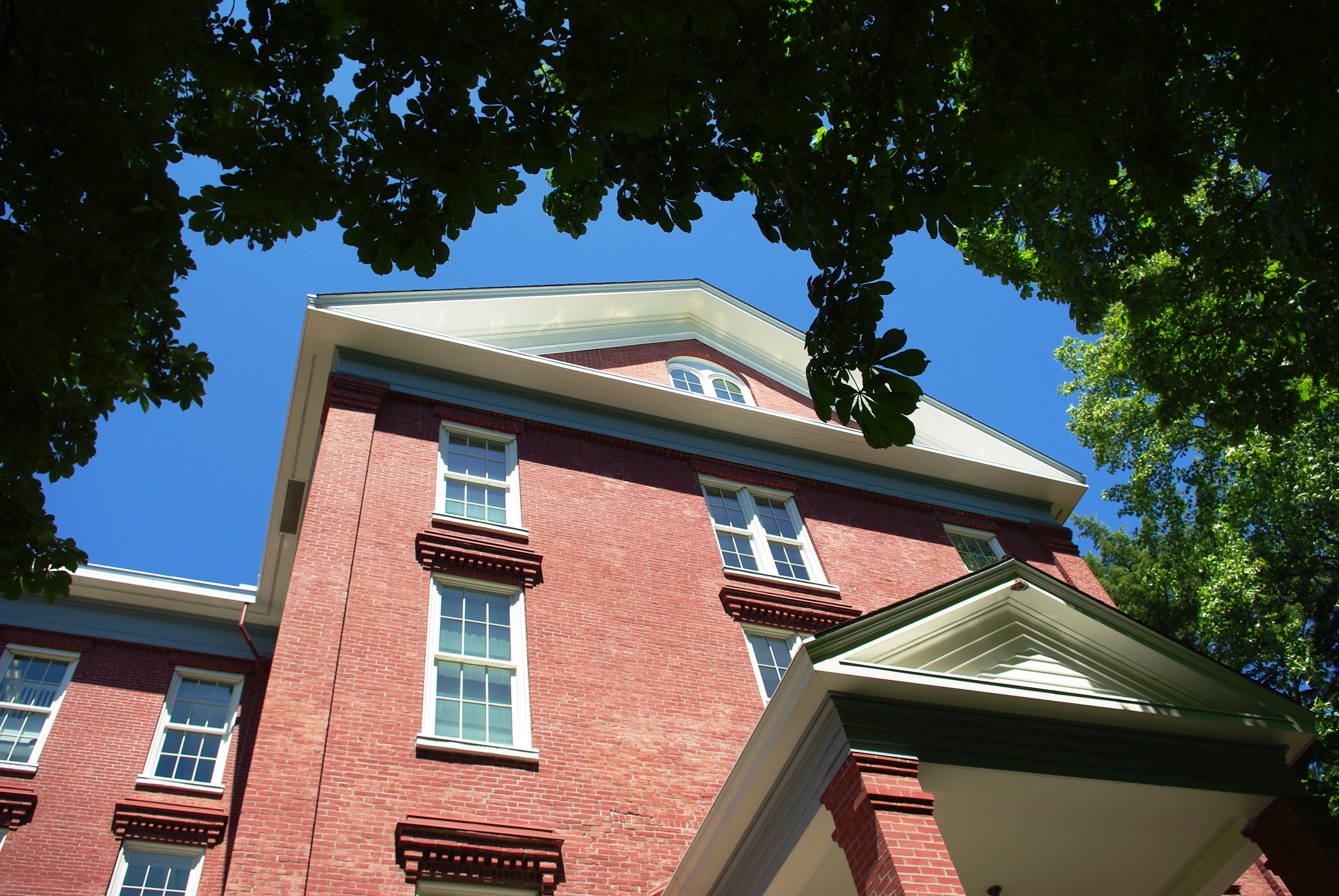
Waller Hall at Willamette

In 1847, Alvin Waller moved to Salem, Oregon, and served as pastor to the old mission's congregation until 1857. The following year he settled a Donation Land Claim in the city. Waller began working with the Oregon Institute and helped in its transition to Willamette University in 1853. During this time he helped to raise funds for the construction of a new brick structure for the school that was completed in 1867 and named University Hall. The building was renamed as Waller Hall in 1912 to honor him. He remained active in religious and education activities and helped found several churches in Oregon in his later years. Alvin F. Waller died on December 26, 1872, at the age of 64 in Salem. He was buried at the Lee Mission Cemetery in that city.
