= Peter G. Stewart =

American jeweler, pioneer, and politician (1809–1900)

Peter Grant Stewart

Second Executive Committee of the Provisional Government of Oregon
- In office 1844–1845
- Constituency: Oregon Country

Personal details
- Born: September 6, 1809 New York
- Died: August 27, 1900 (aged 90) Tacoma, Washington
- Spouse(s): Rebecca Rawlings Cason d. 1863; Eliza Rosecrans
- Occupation: politician, jeweler

Peter Grant Stewart (September 6, 1809 – August 27, 1900) was a jeweler and pioneer of the Oregon Country in what later became the U.S. states of Oregon and Washington. A native of New York state, he traveled the Oregon Trail to the Willamette Valley and settled first in Oregon City and later in what became Washington. He was served on the Second Executive Committee of the Provisional Government of Oregon, and his homesite became part of Fort Canby at the mouth of the Columbia River.

== Early life ==
Peter G. Stewart was born in Stamford, New York, on September 6, 1809. Then in 1817, he moved to Jefferson, New York, then to Middleburgh, New York, and then in 1840 to Springfield, Missouri. During this time Stewart worked as jeweler and watchmaker, and married Rebecca Rawlings Cason on September 1, 1842, in Missouri. Cason was born in 1826 in Virginia.

== Oregon Trail ==
On May 22, 1843, the Stewart party left Independence, Missouri with two wagons in the "Great Migration" of that year. The Stewart party included his new wife and his in-laws traveled as they traveled over the Oregon Trail. On the journey Stewart is credited with helping fellow immigrant James W. Nesmith with rescuing William Vaughn from drowning while crossing the Kaw River. Also in this wagon train were other prominent people of the era. This includes Doctor Marcus Whitman from the mission near Walla Walla, Washington and Jesse Applegate who would soon open the Applegate Trail with his brothers. Additionally, along the journey the party encountered Lieutenant John C. Frémont of the United States Army, who was on a surveying mission.

== Oregon Country ==
Stewart arrived in the Oregon Country in 1843. After a short time in Oregon, Stewart volunteered to help rescue the Joel Palmer wagon train in 1845. In 1850 while living in Oregon City, Stewart purchased part of the townsite of Pacific City in what was then Lewis County from Elijah White. There he built an "iron house" and saw mill at this site near the entrance of the Columbia River to the Pacific Ocean and Cape Disappointment, near the present-day Ilwaco, Washington. By 1853 he was part owner of the Pacific Steam Saw Mill Company at that site. Later in 1853 the United States government took the property to use as a light house, and to use as military installation, Fort Canby. At that time the government did not pay Stewart as he only had squatter's rights to the land, but later at the age of 82 he petitioned the state of Washington who then sent a memorial to Congress to ask the Federal Government to appropriate funds for Stewart's benefit. Oregon then did the same, and Oregon Senator John H. Mitchell introduced a bill to pay Stewart for the property in 1891. In 1899 Peter Stewart was then paid $7,500 for the loss of his property by the United States government.

After Pacific City, he returned to the jewelry and watch making business. Stewart plied this trade in Oregon City from 1854 to 1860. Then in 1861 he moved to Portland, Oregon where he and his business were burned out in 1862 and again in 1873. In between fires, Peter Stewart's wife died in 1863, and he then remarried in 1872 to Eliza Rosecrans. Years later Peter Stewart moved to Tacoma, Washington where he died August 27, 1900, at the age of 90.

== Government ==
In May 1844, Stewart was elected by the pioneer settlers to the Second Executive Committee of the Provisional Government of Oregon. He received 140 votes to finish second in the voting and receive one of the three positions along with Osborne Russell and William J. Bailey. Peter Stewart served on the executive committee from May 25, 1844, to July 14, 1845. This committee was then replaced with a single executive and George Abernethy was elected as governor. He was then chosen to be the first judge for the District Court of Clackamas County, Oregon. Then in 1853 he served as surveyor for the community of Pacific City. Lastly, from 1870 to 1879 Stewart served as city recorder for the town of Gervais in the Willamette Valley on French Prairie.

== Family ==
Stewart's first wife Rebecca's parents were Fendal Carr Cason, a member of the Oregon Territorial Legislature, and Rebecca Holladay Cason. Oregon's first territorial recorder, John Long, was Stewart's brother-in-law. Peter fathered nine children, all by his first wife: Nellie, Margaret, Frederick, James, Katherine, Charles, Catherine, Mary, and George. Catherine died on the journey over the Oregon Trail and Nellie, born in 1863, was the youngest.

Preceded by First Executive Committee with Alanson Beers; David Hill; Joseph Gale	Second Executive Committee; Provisional Government of Oregon; 1844-1845 with William J. Bailey; Osborne Russell	Succeeded by Governor of Provisional Government; George Abernethy
