= Ira Babcock =

American judge

Ira L. Babcock

1st and 3rd Supreme Judge of the Provisional Government of Oregon
- In office February 18, 1841 – May 2, 1843
- Preceded by: Office established
- Succeeded by: Osborne Russell
- In office June 27, 1844 – November 11, 1844
- Preceded by: Osborne Russell
- Succeeded by: James Nesmith

Chairman/President of the Committee at Champoeg Meetings
- In office September 23, 1842 – May 2, 1843
- Preceded by: David Leslie
- Succeeded by: First Executive Committee

Personal details
- Born: c. 1808 New York, U.S.
- Died: March 21, 1888
- Occupation: Physician, judge

Ira Leonard Babcock (c. 1808 – March 21, 1888) was an American pioneer and medical doctor in the Oregon Country. A native of New York, he was selected as the first Supreme Judge with probate powers in February 1841 in what would become the state of Oregon.

Although the meeting where he was selected did not produce an acting government, he also took over the executive and legislative powers as the first person in Oregon's history. The meeting was the first of several meetings, presided by him since 1842, that led to a Provisional Government in the Willamette Valley in May 1843.

== Early life ==
Babcock was born in the state of New York around 1808 where he received medical training. He came to what was then the unorganized Oregon Country from New York while working for the Methodist Mission run by Jason Lee. Babcock arrived in Oregon in 1840 aboard the ship Lausanne with his wife and one son. They traveled with Jason Lee’s reinforcements for the mission that was re-located to present day Salem, Oregon. The Lausanne had sailed around Cape Horn and included future governor George Abernethy and the Reverend Gustavus Hines.

== Judgeship ==
Babcock was selected at the Champoeg Meeting in David Leslie's home on February 18, 1841, to be the first Supreme Judge for the settlers of the region. There was a need for a probate court in order to deal with the estate of Ewing Young. Young had become a wealthy rancher due to his economic activities that included participation in the Willamette Cattle Company in 1837. At the same time Babcock's election had also been a compromise after French Canadians had failed to elect William J. Bailey for Governor as well as English Americans had failed to elect Babcock. As the settlers were not able to agree on the form of the discussed government, Babcock also received executive and in fact legislative duties because there had been no copy of the New York laws in the country that had been proposed for usage.

In 1842, Babcock helped to organize the Oregon Institute as a school for the children of the American settlers. After holding the Supreme Judge title for two years, in which he had presided over a constitutional committee of six people at several Champoeg or so called Wolf Meetings, Babcock also was President at the discussions on May 2, 1843, when he called for a vote and the settlers thereby gave themselves a Provisional Government by narrowly accepting the committee's report with 52–50 votes. Shortly after that he took his family to the Sandwich Islands for one year. After returning he was elected as Supreme Judge again, but left Oregon permanently in November 1844. After leaving Oregon he joined the United States Army and served as a surgeon. In 1870, he returned to Oregon on a visit.
