= William J. Bailey =

British-born physician, pioneer and politician

Second Executive Committee
- In office 1844–1845
- Preceded by: First Executive Committee
- Succeeded by: George Abernethy
- Constituency: Oregon Country

Provisional Legislature of Oregon
- In office 1848–1849
- Constituency: Champoeg County

Personal details
- Born: January 13, 1807 England
- Died: February 5, 1876 (aged 69) Champoeg, Oregon
- Spouse(s): 1) Margaret Jewett Smith; 2) Julia M. Sheil

William J. Bailey (January 13, 1807 – February 5, 1876) was a British-born medical doctor who migrated to the United States, where he became a pioneer and politician in the Oregon Country, particularly the Willamette Valley. Bailey participated in the Champoeg Meetings that led to the creation of a provisional government in Oregon. He was selected as a member of that government, first on the executive committee and later in the Provisional Legislature of Oregon.

== Early life ==
William Bailey was born in Great Britain on January 13, 1807. In England he was said to have studied medicine, before emigrating with his mother to the United States sometime before 1834. In the US he enlisted in the Navy and traveled to the West Coast as a seaman, but deserted his ship in San Francisco. There is no evidence that he practiced medicine in the United States.

== Oregon ==
William Bailey moved to Oregon from California in 1835, settling in the Willamette Valley. Bailey's group included John Woodward, George K. Gay, and John Turner. On this journey north, the group fought with the Rogue River Indians, losing four of their eight members of the party. Woodward, Gay, Bailey, and Turner were the survivors. Years later, Bailey and Gay murdered a Native American youth in the same area in retaliation during a cattle drive north from California. Bailey was working in the Willamette Cattle Company cattle drive from Mexican-owned California to Oregon. Leading the cattle drive was Ewing Young. In 1834 his party had killed several Rogue River natives on their journey to Oregon. This prompted their retaliation against Bailey's party the following year.

== Politics ==
When the wealthy Ewing Young died without a will or known heir in February 1841, discussions about forming a settler government based in the Willamette Valley began. During these settler meetings, Bailey was selected as chairman of the committee to draft a constitution and laws for the region. The plans fell through due to the opposition by French-Canadians and instead only a probate court was established. Many participants in the talks were active in the later Champoeg Meetings, which led to the creation of the Provisional Government of Oregon.

During the provisional government, William Bailey served as a member of the Second Executive Committee, along with Peter G. Stewart and Osborne Russell. This body acted in place of a single executive, though it was replaced with a governor in 1845 to streamline the executive branch of the government. The first and only governor was George Abernethy. In 1848, Bailey was elected to the provisional legislature from the Champoeg district.

== Marriage and Later life ==
In Oregon Bailey married Margaret Jewett Smith from the Methodist Mission on 4 March 1839. In 1842 he sold his farm for $300 and left the Oregon Country for the United States of America. The couple returned two years later in May 1844, having to spend $700 to purchase his old farm. Selling his farm for $1,275 in 1850, the Baileys by September 1853 had established a homestead in Champoeg. Bailey at this point was openly having sex with any willing native woman. The couple's marriage continued to deteriorate, with Margaret fearing William's violent behaviors. The two did not have any children and divorced in 1854.

On 2 November 1855 Bailey remarried to Julia M. Sheil. Bailey developed his property in Champoeg. He died there on February 5, 1876. He was buried at St. Paul Cemetery in St. Paul, Oregon.

Preceded by First Executive Committee with Alanson Beers; David Hill; Joseph Gale	Second Executive Committee; Provisional Government of Oregon; 1844-1845 with Osborne Russell; Peter G. Stewart	Succeeded by Governor of Provisional Government; George Abernethy
