= Harvey K. Hines =

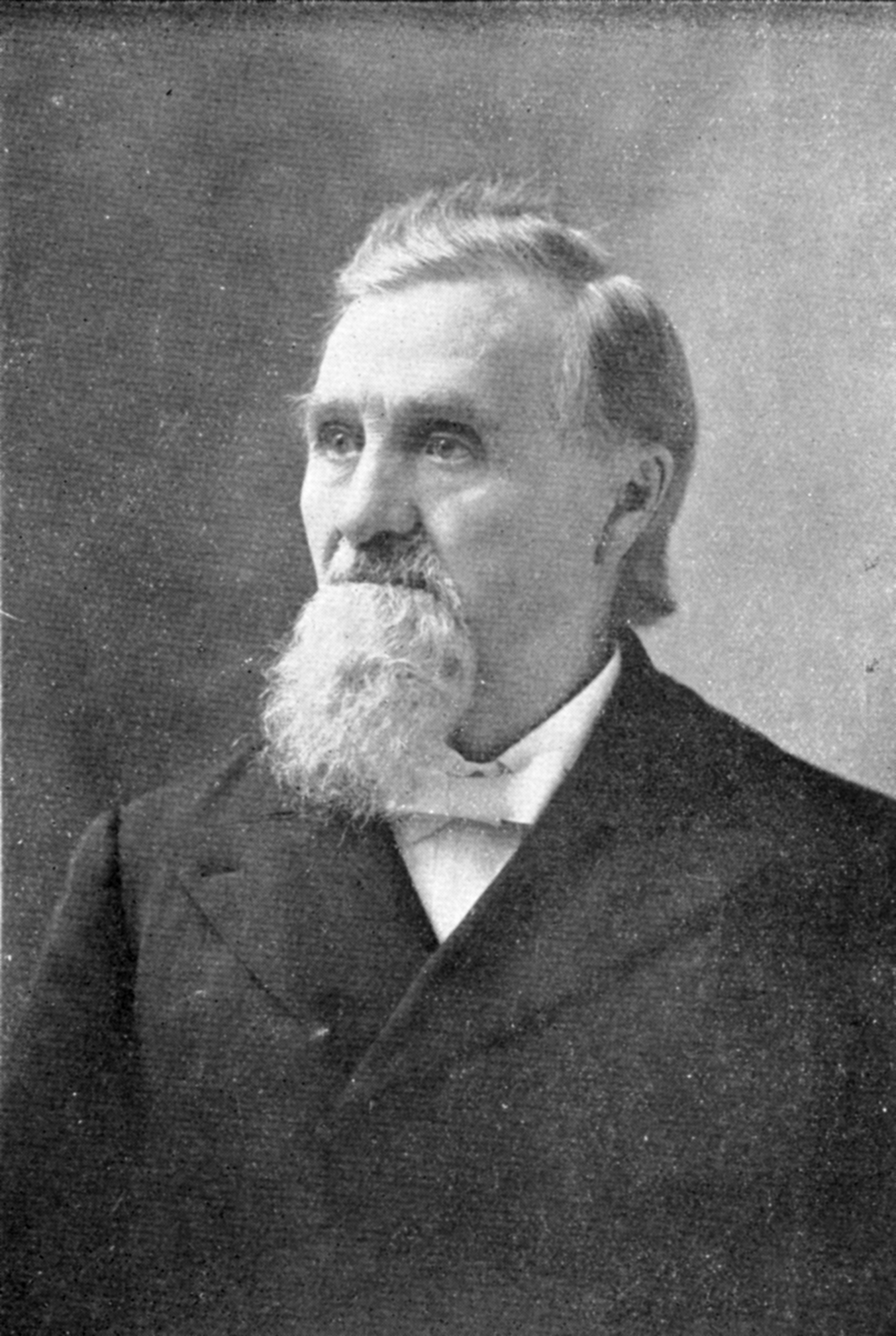

Harvey Kimball Hines (1828–1902) was a Methodist minister and an early historian of the U.S. state of Oregon. In 1878 he ran for Congress, and drew criticism for neglecting his religious vows in so doing. He was known, along with Frances Fuller Victor, as a historian who delved through early original documents. Gustavus Hines was his older brother.

In 1901 he joined Harvey Whitefield Scott and governor Geer in dedicating a monument to the framers of the Provisional Government of Oregon. He died at his home in Portland on January 18, 1902. He was initially buried at Lone Fir Cemetery. In autumn that year his remains and those of his wife were removed to the Methodist Lee Mission Cemetery in Salem.

== Works ==
- (1893). An illustrated history of the state of Oregon [microform] : containing a history of Oregon from the earliest period of its discovery to the present time, together with glimpses of its auspicious future; illustrations and full-page portraits of some of its eminent men and biographical mention of many of its pioneers and prominent citizens of to-day. Canadiana.org. Chicago : Lewis Pub. Co. ISBN 978-0-665-15234-4
- (1893). An illustrated history of the state of Washington, containing biographical mention of its pioneers and prominent citizens. Allen County Public Library Genealogy Center. Chicago, The Lewis publishing company
- (1898) At sea and in port; or, Life and experience of William S. Fletcher. The Library of Congress. Portland, Or., The J. K. Gill company
- 1899). Missionary history of the Pacific Northwest : containing the wonderful story of Jason Lee : with sketches of many of his co-laborers, all illustrating life on the plains and in the mountains in pioneer days. Emmanuel - University of Toronto. Portland : H.K Hines
