= Alanson Beers =

American pioneer and politician (1808–1853)

Executive Committee of the Provisional Government of Oregon
- In office 1843–1844
- Preceded by: position created
- Succeeded by: Second Executive Committee
- Constituency: Oregon Country

Personal details
- Born: August 19, 1804 Connecticut
- Died: February 20, 1853 (aged 44) Salem, Oregon
- Spouse: Rachel Beers

Alanson Beers (August 19, 1808 – February 20, 1853) was an American pioneer and politician in the early days of the settlement of the Oregon Country. A blacksmith by trade, he was a reinforcement for the Methodist Mission in what would become the state of Oregon. The Connecticut native helped found the Oregon Institute and participated in the Champoeg Meetings where he was elected to serve on the Executive Committee in 1843.

== Early life ==
Beers was born August 19, 1804, in Weston, Fairfield County, Connecticut, the son of Isaac Beers, an American Revolutionary War soldier and wife Jemima Rowell. There he was trained as a blacksmith. Prior to immigrating to Oregon, Alanson married Rachel, with whom he had six children; Elenor, Benjamian, William, Oliver, Abigail, and Jonathan.

== Oregon ==
Alanson Beers moved to Oregon in 1837, arriving on the ship Diana in May. He was part of the reinforcements for the Methodist Mission that Jason Lee had traveled back east to gather. After arriving with his wife, he brought the supplies for the mission from the ship by small boat on the Willamette River. Beers then built a home and blacksmith's shop at the Mission. Later, he worked for the Mission Manual Labor School for Indians and at the Oregon Institute, now Willamette University as a blacksmith making building products for the construction of homes and mills.

In 1843 at the Champoeg Meetings he was chosen for the legislative committee to draft the original laws of the provisional government, and then chosen by the members to be the chairperson of the judiciary committee. Then on July 5, he was elected as one of the three members of the First Executive Committee along with David Hill and Joseph Gale. He was chosen to represent the interests of the Methodist Mission in the government.

During his service on the executive committee Beers lead the organization of a militia. This occurred in 1844 in response to an incident with the native populations in the Willamette Valley.

== Later life ==
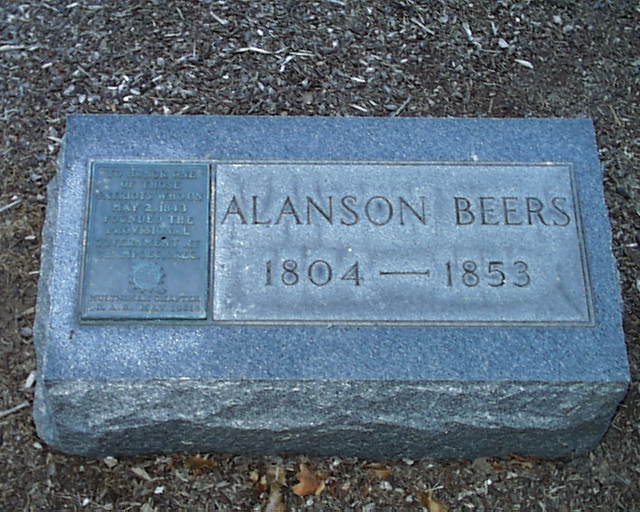
Beers' grave at Lee Mission Cemetery (note the birth date is incorrect on gravestone)

In July 1844 Beers opted to receive a farm, equipment, a blacksmith shop, and $1,000 from the Methodist Mission in lieu of passage back to Connecticut. At this time the mission was re-organizing under the Reverend George Gary. In 1846 Alanson formed a partnership with George Abernethy to buy grist mills at the island mills near Oregon City, Oregon, calling the enterprise the Oregon Milling Company. The company milled lumber and ground flour. Then prior to his death in 1853 he built a house to be used as a dormitory by the Oregon Institute, which the school then bought for $300 after his death and named Beers House. The school also offered each of his children a scholarship. Alanson Beers is buried at the Lee Mission Cemetery in Salem, Oregon.

Preceded by None (Government established)	Executive Committee of the Provisional Government of Oregon; 1843-1844 with David Hill; Joseph Gale	Replaced by Second Executive Committee with Osborne Russell; Peter G. Stewart; William J. Bailey
