= Joseph Gale =

American pioneer

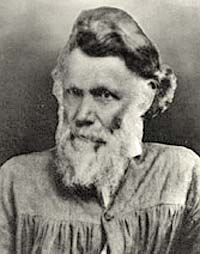

Executive Committee of the Provisional Government of Oregon
- In office 1843–1844
- Preceded by: position created
- Succeeded by: Second Executive Committee
- Constituency: Oregon Country

Personal details
- Born: April 29, 1807 Washington, D.C., U.S.
- Died: December 13, 1881 (aged 74) Eagle Valley, Oregon, U.S.
- Spouse: Eliza Gale
- Relations: Old Chief Joseph
- Occupation: trapper, sailor, miner

Joseph Goff Gale (April 29, 1807 – December 13, 1881) was an American pioneer, trapper, entrepreneur, and politician who contributed to the early settlement of the Oregon Country. There he assisted in the construction of the first sailing vessel built in what would become the state of Oregon, sailed the ship to California to trade for cattle, and later served as one of three co-executives ("governors") in the Provisional Government of Oregon. Originally a sailor, he also spent time in the fur trade, as a farmer, and a gold miner in the California Gold Rush.

== Early life ==
Joseph Gale was born in Washington, D.C., on April 29, 1807, the son of Mary Gale (née Goff) and Joseph Gale, a sea captain from Pennsylvania. Both of his parents died when Joseph was young, but he did receive an education and some training as a sailor. Gale arrived on the Pacific Coast as early as 1828 with the Bean-Sinclair party that had been shipwrecked off the coast of California. From 1830 until 1839, the heyday of the Rocky Mountain fur trade, he was a well regarded trapper and an associate of western legends such as Ewing Young, Nathaniel Wyeth, Joe Meek, Jim Bridger, and Chief Joseph of the Nez Perce Indians.

== Fur trapper and trader ==
As early as 1830, Joseph Gale had traveled to Taos and was fur trapping and trading in the southern Rocky Mountains. In October 1831, he departed Santa Fe as a member of Ewing Young's second trip to California. The goal of this expedition was to export horses and mules from California for sale in the Missouri Valley, and do some trapping of beaver and perhaps hunting sea otter on the side. Whether Gale went all the way to California, or remained at the Colorado River to wait for the returning party is unclear. However, Gale likely accompanied David Jackson and the California livestock back to New Mexico, arriving in July 1832.

A year later, in July 1833, Gale was at the fur trapper's Rendezvous at Green River in present-day Wyoming, where he joined Joseph Walker's expedition to California. The expedition traveled from the Great Salt Lake to California by way of the Humboldt River, crossing the Sierra Nevada near the Yosemite Valley. Traversing the rough mountain terrain in October took a month. In November, Walker and company finally reached the Pacific Ocean. In February 1834, the Joseph Walker party began its return trip to the Rocky Mountains, but Gale stayed behind in California. He instead joined his friend Ewing Young on his historic cattle drive from California to Oregon, along with of Oregon promoter Hall Jackson Kelley. The Ewing Young party, and the first cattle introduced to Oregon, reached the Willamette Valley in October 1834.

Less than a month later, Gale and a "picked up lot" were hired by Nathaniel Wyeth and traveled to Fort Hall in present-day Idaho. Gale was soon leading a "spring hunt" in the Rockies north of the Great Salt Lake. In the fall of 1835, Gale lead his party of men to the Gallatin River, where they had a bloody encounter with Blackfeet Indians. Gale and his party, Kit Carson, Joe Meek, and several others were fortunate to survive the encounter. Joseph Gale continued to work at Fort Hall for the next few years. After the sale of Fort Hall in August 1837, he began trapping and trading for the Hudson's Bay Company.

== Family life ==
While working for Wyeth out of Fort Hall, Joseph married Eliza (native name Bear Claws), a Walla Walla Indian woman who was a daughter of Old Chief Joseph (Tu-eka-kas) of the Wallowa band of the Nez Perce and a Walla Walla mother. As such, she was the half-sister of Young Chief Joseph (Heinmot Tooyalakekt). Her given name, Eliza, may have been adopted from Eliza Spalding, co-founder of the Protestant mission at Lapwai. Joseph Gale and Eliza's first two children (Francis Ellen and Edward) were born at Fort Hall in 1837 and 1838, three more children were born in the Oregon Territory (Susan, Margaret and Mary), and three more girls (Maria Antonia, Clara and Sabrina) were born in present-day Kern County, California, during the 1850s.

== Oregon Country ==
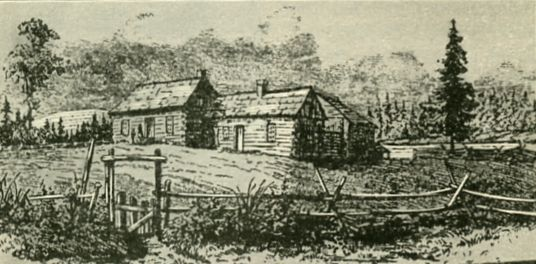
The Mission Bottom in 1834.

In 1839, Joseph Gale and his family left Fort Hall and moved west of the Cascade mountains. Gale soon had a job working at the Methodist Mission sawmill in Mission Bottom. Within a year, the family had settled on the Tualatin Plains, where they were soon joined by the families of other mountain men, including Robert Newell, George W. Ebbert, Caleb Wilkins, William Doughty, and Joe Meek. With the collapse of the international market for beaver furs, the fur trappers had quit the business and were settling down in the Oregon Country.

As Oregon began to attract people, the lack of a sustainable economy became a problem. Moreover, settlers were suffering from an acute livestock shortage. In 1840, a group of settlers began construction of a ship with the goal of sailing the vessel to San Francisco, and trading it for cattle to bring back north. Ship building commenced on the Star of Oregon (as it was later to be named) on Swan Island (Portland, Oregon) with Felix Hathaway hired as the ship builder. A year later, Joseph Gale was offered command of the ship and a share of the ownership. To raise capital and free his labor for its construction, Gale sold his Tualatin Valley farm and moved his family to Champoeg. All summer and fall he worked on construction of the schooner at Oregon City, where it had been relocated, which came after Hathaway quit the project and left the completion up to the remaining partners. During the winter and spring of 1841 to 42, Gale worked for the Methodist Mission, running its sawmill.

In August 1842, the Star of Oregon - the first ocean-going vessel built in Oregon - left Oregon City for two weeks of practice runs on the Columbia River. In September, the ship left for California with a crew of five inexperienced men and an Indian boy with Gale as captain. On reaching San Francisco, the ship was sold for 350 cows. The following spring, Gale and 42 others drove 1,250 cattle, 600 horses and mules, and 3,000 sheep back to the Oregon Country. it was the second known cattle drive to Oregon.

Partly in recognition for his accomplishment, Joseph Gale was named to the first executive committee of the Provisional Government of Oregon. Oregon’s first form of government, as implemented by the citizens’ meeting at Champoeg on July 5, 1843, favored an Executive Committee instead of a single executive. The Executive Committee of 1843 was made up of David Hill, Alanson Beers, and Gale.

By 1844, Joseph Gale and his family had settled on Gales Creek in Washington County, Oregon, where he established a grist mill and sawmill, perhaps using profits gained from the California-to-Oregon cattle drive.

== California and the gold rush ==
With news of the California Gold Rush, Joseph Gale moved from the Oregon Territory to California, where he lived first at Mission San Jose and later near Fort Tejon in Los Angeles County where he ran a sawmill. On January 9, 1857, Joseph Gale and family suffered the effects of the Great Fort Tejon earthquake. "Mr. Gale, whose dwelling is situated..(approximately 1.5 miles from) the Fort experienced a severe injury during his exertions to rescue his children from the ruins of his falling house".

In August 1859, Gale received a permit to run a ferry over the Kern River (at Gordon's Ferry, Tulare County). Located on the main stage route from Los Angeles to San Francisco, this venture was potentially profitable. However, Gale's business activities were badly damaged with the demise of the Butterfield Overland Mail service in March 1861 and the closing of Fort Tejon in June 1861. In January 1862, a record flood washed away the ferry, stage station, and much of the road connecting San Francisco with Los Angeles. Gale abandoned the ferry and moved to Walla Walla.

== Return to Eastern Oregon ==
By late 1862 Gale and his family had moved to Walla Walla, Washington Territory, where his daughter Frances and husband Thomas Page had settled. By 1868, Gale had relocated to Eagle Valley in Eastern Oregon, where he engaged in farming and other business activities related to the gold strikes in the Eagle Cap mountains. Before the Nez Perce War (1877), Young Chief Joseph and the Wallowa Nez Perce would often come and stay with Joseph and Eliza during visits to Eagle Valley, a traditional Nez Perce hunting and fishing territory.

Joseph Gale died on his farm on December 13, 1881. After Gale's death, Eliza moved to the Umatilla Indian Reservation, where she died in 1905.

== Legacy ==
Many landmarks have been named in his honor, including Gales Creek, Gales Peak, the small town of Gales Creek, Joseph Gale Elementary School, and Joseph Gale Park in Forest Grove.

Preceded by None (Government established)	Executive Committee of the Provisional Government of Oregon; 1843-1844 with Alanson Beers; David Hill	Replaced by Second Executive Committee with Osborne Russell; Peter G. Stewart; William J. Bailey
