= Osborne Russell =

American judge

2nd Supreme Judge of the Provisional Government of Oregon
- In office October 2, 1843 – May 14, 1844
- Preceded by: Ira Babcock
- Succeeded by: Ira Babcock

Member of the Second Executive Committee
- In office 1844–1845
- Preceded by: First Executive Committee
- Succeeded by: George Abernethy
- Constituency: Oregon Country

Personal details
- Born: June 12, 1814 Maine
- Died: May 1, 1884 (aged 69)

Osborne Russell (June 12, 1814 – May 1, 1884) was a mountain man and politician who helped form the government of the U.S. state of Oregon. He was born in Maine.

== Early life ==
Osborne Russell was born June 12, 1814, in the village of Bowdoinham, Maine. He was one of nine children in the farming family of George G. and Eleanor (Power) Russell. At age 16, Russell ran away for a life at sea, but quickly gave up that career by deserting his ship at New York. Afterwards he spent three years in the employ of the Northwest Fur Trapping and Trading Company, which operated in Wisconsin and Minnesota. Russell first came to the Oregon Country in 1834 as a member of Nathaniel J. Wyeth's second expedition where Russell joined Nathaniel Wyeth's Columbia River Fishing and Trading Company expedition to the Rocky Mountains. The company was contracted to deliver $3,000 worth of supplies and trade goods to Milton Sublette and Thomas Fitzpatrick of the Rocky Mountain Fur Company for the 1834 Rendezvous. Men for this venture were recruited on the frontier at St Louis and Independence, Missouri. It was in Independence that Osborne Russell joined the company. The term of service was for eighteen months at a wage of $250.

In spite of his previous experience with the Northwest Fur Trapping and Trading Company, Russell was still inexperienced in the ways of the wilderness when he joined Wyeth's company. Through his journal we see Russell develop into a seasoned veteran of the mountains and a Free Trapper. When Wyeth's party arrived at the Rendezvous at Ham's Fork of Green River, he found that the Rocky Mountain Fur Company had been dissolved and a new company formed. The new company defaulted on its contract with Wyeth, who was then left with a surplus of goods and supplies that he had transported to the mountains. By necessity, Wyeth had to alter his own plans to salvage his company from financial ruin. He and his party pushed on to the Snake River plain, (near what would become Pocatello, Idaho) where he established Fort Hall, named after one of the partners in the company, Henry Hall. Here Wyeth would trade his remaining goods with the local Indians. The fort was quickly completed, and trade with the Indians was started by the autumn of 1834. It was not until the spring of 1835 that Wyeth fielded trapping parties operating out of the fort. These trapping parties were poorly managed, and unlike many others, Russell did not desert.

After his release from the Columbia River Fishing and Trading Company in late 1835, Russell joined with Jim Bridger's brigade of former Rocky Mountain Fur Company men. He continued with them even after the merger with the American Fur Company leaving it in complete control of the fur trade in the Rocky Mountains. With low prices, scarcity of beaver and declining demand for furs, rumors at the 1838 rendezvous indicated the American Fur Company was soon to abandon the Rocky Mountains. Russell would not attend the 1839 Rendezvous, as he had left the employ of the company to become a Free Trapper, once again operating out of Fort Hall. Fort Hall was now owned by the Hudson's Bay Company.

He returned to the country in 1842 with the Elijah White party. He participated in the May 2, 1843 Champoeg Meeting, voting in favor of forming a government. In October of that year he was selected by the First Executive Committee to serve as the Supreme Judge for the Provisional Government of Oregon and served until May 14, 1844. In 1844, he was elected to the second Executive Committee of the Provisional Government of Oregon. He was unsuccessful in his run for governor of the Provisional Government in 1845, giving his support to George Abernethy. Russell eventually went to California in 1848, after the discovery of gold there.

Osborne Russell died in Placerville, California on May 1, 1884.

Although not published until well after the establishment of Yellowstone National Park, Osborne's Journal of a Trapper contains an early description of Yellowstone and surrounding areas.

== Works ==
- Russell, Osborne and Aubrey L. Haines. Journal of a Trapper: In the Rocky Mountains Between 1834 and 1843; Comprising a General Description of the Country, Climate, Rivers, Lakes, Mountains, Etc, The Nature and Habits of Animals, Manners and Customs of Indians and a Complete View of the Life Led by a Hunter in those Regions ISBN 978-1542843317 ISBN 1-58976-052-2

Preceded by First Executive Committee with Alanson Beers; David Hill; Joseph Gale	Second Executive Committee; Provisional Government of Oregon; 1844-1845 with William J. Bailey; Peter G. Stewart	Succeeded by Governor of Provisional Government; George Abernethy
