= Gustavus Hines =

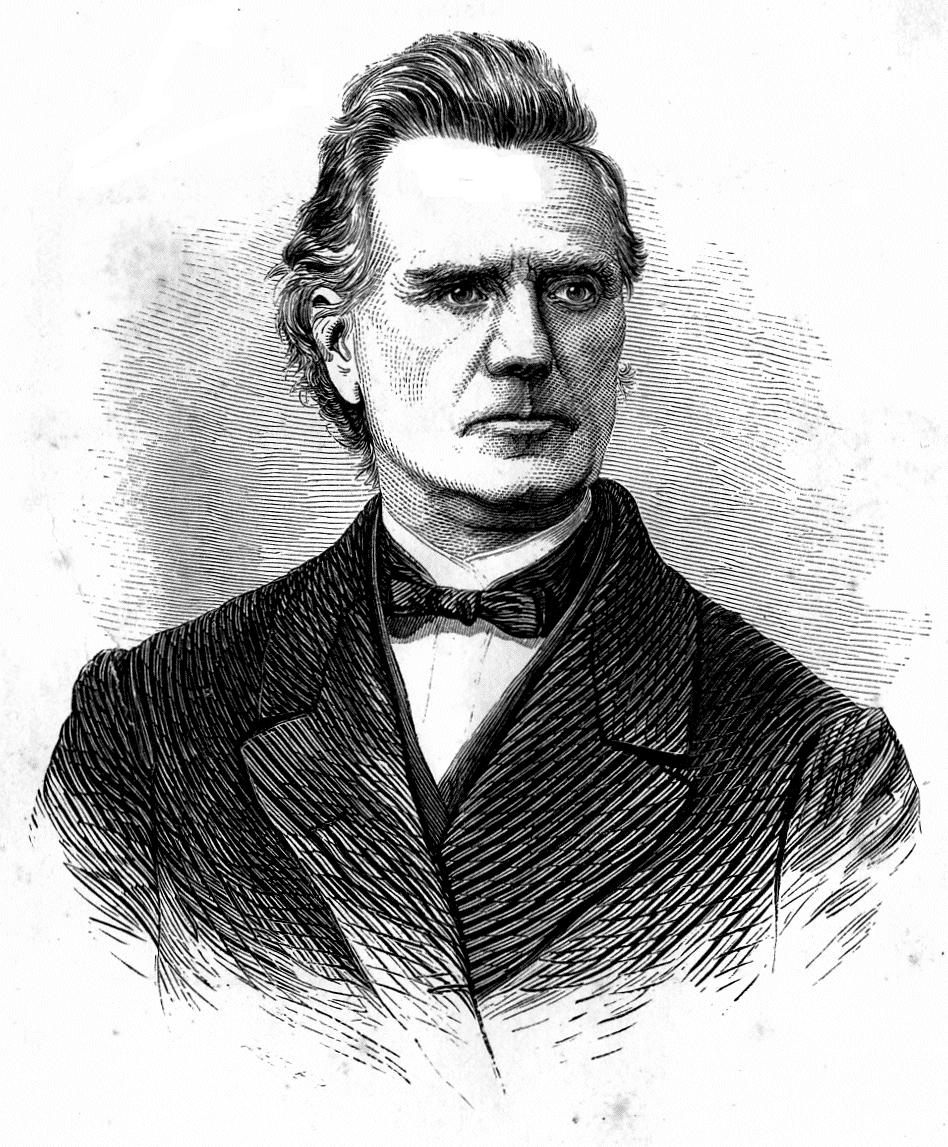
- Sketch from 1868 book.
- Born: September 6, 1809; Herkimer County, New York
- Died: December 9, 1873 (aged 64); Oregon City, Oregon
- Occupations: Missionary, author
- Spouse: Lydia Hines (née Bryant)
- Writing career
- Period: Mid 19th Century
- Genre: History

Reverend Gustavus Hines (September 6, 1809 – December 9, 1873) was an American missionary in Oregon Country. Working for the Methodist Mission in what became the state of Oregon, the New York native became involved in early attempts to form a government at the Champoeg Meetings in 1841. Later he served on the board of trustees for the Oregon Institute, which became Willamette University, and wrote several books on Oregon.

== Early life ==
Gustavus Hines was born on September 6, 1809, in Herkimer County, New York, to Betsy Round and James Hines. He then entered the ministry in 1832 as part of the Genesee Conference. The Reverend then joined missionary Jason Lee in 1839 as part of the Great Reinforcements for the Methodist Mission in the Oregon Country.

== Oregon ==
Reverend Hines arrived in Oregon in 1840 aboard the ship Lausanne. He, his wife Lydia, and his sister-in-law all journeyed to the Pacific Northwest via Cape Horn at the tip of South America. After arrival, he went with Lee to the Umpqua River valley to scout a site for a new mission location.

The following year Gustavus Hines was involved with the Champoeg Meetings as a person selected to a committee designed to draft laws that were an attempt at creating a government in the region that was under no formal government at the time. At the February 1841 meetings at David Leslie’s home, Hines served as secretary for the legislative body gathered on French Prairie. These meetings did not create a government in 1841, but did elect Doctor Ira L. Babcock as a judge to deal with the estate of Ewing Young. Two years later continued meetings led the formation of the Provisional Government of Oregon. Hines' younger brother Harvey would journey to Oregon in 1853.

In 1842, Lucy Anna Lee was born to Jason Lee's second wife who died shortly after child birth. The Reverend Hines and his wife took in the child and raised her after losing their own daughter, their only child. After the closing of the Methodist Mission, Hines returned to New York in 1845.

Hines believed that God killed off the native people of Oregon with disease so that whites could take their land. "The hand of Providence is removing them to give place to a people more worthy of so beautiful and fertile a country," he wrote.

== Later life ==
However, he would return to what became Oregon Territory in 1853. There he was involved as a trustee for Willamette University in Salem, Oregon, including work on the committee that designed Waller Hall. Gustavus Hines also wrote several books before dying in Oregon City, but buried at Lee Mission Cemetery in Salem. He died on December 9, 1873.

== Works authored ==
- Oregon and Its Institutions; Comprising a Full History of the Willamette University. Carlton & Porter, 1868.
- A Voyage Round the World: With a History of the Oregon Mission and Notes of Several Years Residence on the Plains Bordering the... George H. Derby & Co., Buffalo: 1850.
- Wild life in Oregon:... Hurst & Co., New York: 1881.
