= David Hill (Oregon politician) =

American pioneer and Oregon politician (1809–1850)

Executive Committee of the Provisional Government of Oregon
- In office 1843–1844
- Preceded by: position created
- Succeeded by: Second Executive Committee
- Constituency: Oregon Country

Legislator in the Provisional Government of Oregon
- In office 1844–1849
- Preceded by: position created
- Succeeded by: position dissolved
- Constituency: Tuality District

Oregon Territory House of Representatives
- In office 1849–1850
- Preceded by: position created
- Succeeded by: Ralph Wilcox
- Constituency: Washington County

Personal details
- Born: 1809 Connecticut, United States
- Died: May 9, 1850 (aged 40–41) Hillsboro, Oregon
- Resting place: Hillsboro Pioneer Cemetery; 45.52019°N 123.00592°W
- Spouse: Lucinda McWilliams Wilson Hill Simmons
- Occupation: farmer, legislator

David Hill (1809 – May 9, 1850) was an American pioneer and settler of what became Hillsboro, Oregon, United States. He served in the Provisional Government of Oregon in both the executive and legislative branches, and later as a legislator in the first Oregon Territorial Legislature. Hill made a transaction with the county court in 1850 that led to the renaming of Columbus to Hillsborough in honor of Hill.

== Early life ==
David Hill’s birthplace is listed as Connecticut in some sources, but there is no record of his birth. Some accounts have him living in Virginia, others in Ohio. One account describes that Hill abandoned a wife and children in Ohio before traveling west. Another account says he had two children by his first wife.

== Oregon ==
Hill traveled on the Oregon Trail by wagon train to the Oregon Country. He arrived with Isaiah Kesley, Ralph Wilcox, Richard Williams, and Michael Moore. Once in Oregon he settled a land claim for 640 acres (2.6 km^{2}) in Twality (sic) County, what is now Washington County, Oregon. The claim is in what is now Hillsboro with the recorded date of the claim is July 4, 1847. According to the claim record Hill started the claim in June 1842. With Kesley (Kelsey) and Williams recorded as arriving in Oregon in 1841, it is likely Hill arrived then as well. Hill likely arrived in October 1841 and then wintered with Joseph L. Meek, who he would later serve with in the legislature. David Hill married Lucinda Wilson June 4, 1846. On his land claim and built a cabin that was used for a time as the county courthouse. Also in February 1850 Hill was appointed guardian of five children of the Dunlap clan.

== Politics ==
Hill started in politics in Oregon in 1843 when he was selected as a member of the first legislative committee that drafted the proposal for a Provisional Government in the Oregon Country, including time as its chairperson. Then he attended the Champoeg Meeting of May 2, 1843, where he voted for the creation of the Provisional Government. With the creation of this new government Hill then served as one of three members of the First Executive Committee that acted in place of a single governor. Joseph Gale and Alanson Beers were the other two members of this executive committee that served until 1844. After serving in that position David Hill was elected to the provisional legislature, and later in 1849 as a member of the territorial legislature after Oregon became a territory in 1848. David Hill disliked and opposed the Hudson's Bay Company and its representatives in his official capacity. He also was an opponent of the missionaries.

Elected Positions in Oregon:

Year	Government	Position
1843	Pre-Provisional	Legislative Committee
1843	Provisional	First Executive Committee
1844	Provisional	Legislature
1845	Provisional	Legislature
1847	Provisional	Legislature
1849	Territorial	Legislature-House

== Hillsboro ==
In 1850, Hill sold part of his land to the county for the site of the first Washington County Courthouse. This quarter section of his land claim was to be sold off as a townsite. $200 of the proceeds of the sale of the land was to be paid to Hill, with the rest being kept by the county. The townsite was to be named Hillsborough per the court's order on February 2, 1850, several months before Hill died in May. As Hill died before collecting the proceeds, his widow was paid by the probate court.

== Mrs. Hill ==
David Hill's wife in Oregon was his second wife. Lucinda Hill, however had a total of four husbands. Two before Hill and Wheelock Simmons after, with Simmons the only one to outlive Lucinda. Born on July 2, 1810, Mrs. Hill first married John McWilliams in 1828. After him, she married William Wilson who then died on their journey to Oregon in The Dalles. Lucinda was then the step-mother to William Lewis Wilson, the son of her second husband. Then after David Hill’s death, she married Simmons before dying herself on November 4, 1879.

== Death and legacy ==
There are no known pictures or portraits of Hill. He was six feet one inch tall with black hair. Slim, with a sallow complexion. On May 9, 1850, David Hill died of unknown causes. At the time he was still an active member of the legislature that was then in session. After the assembly of the two houses on Friday May 10, 1850 it was announced that Hon. David Hill had died the previous day, and "after adoption of the usual resolutions" all were adjourned until 10am the following Monday morning in observance. Hill died without a will and his wife was appointed as administratrix of his estate with Robert and Michael Moore, and Ralph Wilcox as appraisers.

David Hill Elementary school in Hillsboro, which was originally established in 1888, was named in his honor, but the school closed in 2008. Hill is buried at the Hillsboro Pioneer Cemetery on TV Highway near Dairy Creek. The cemetery is located on his former land claim, and is near the first recording of a bridge built in Oregon, crossing Dairy Creek. David Hill Winery in Forest Grove is located on a hill named David Hill and the winery is named partly in his honor, though the hill is named for William David who owned a vineyard in the area. Hill's name is one of 158 memorialized in the frieze of the two chambers of the Oregon Legislative Assembly at the Oregon State Capitol, with his located in the House of Representatives chamber.

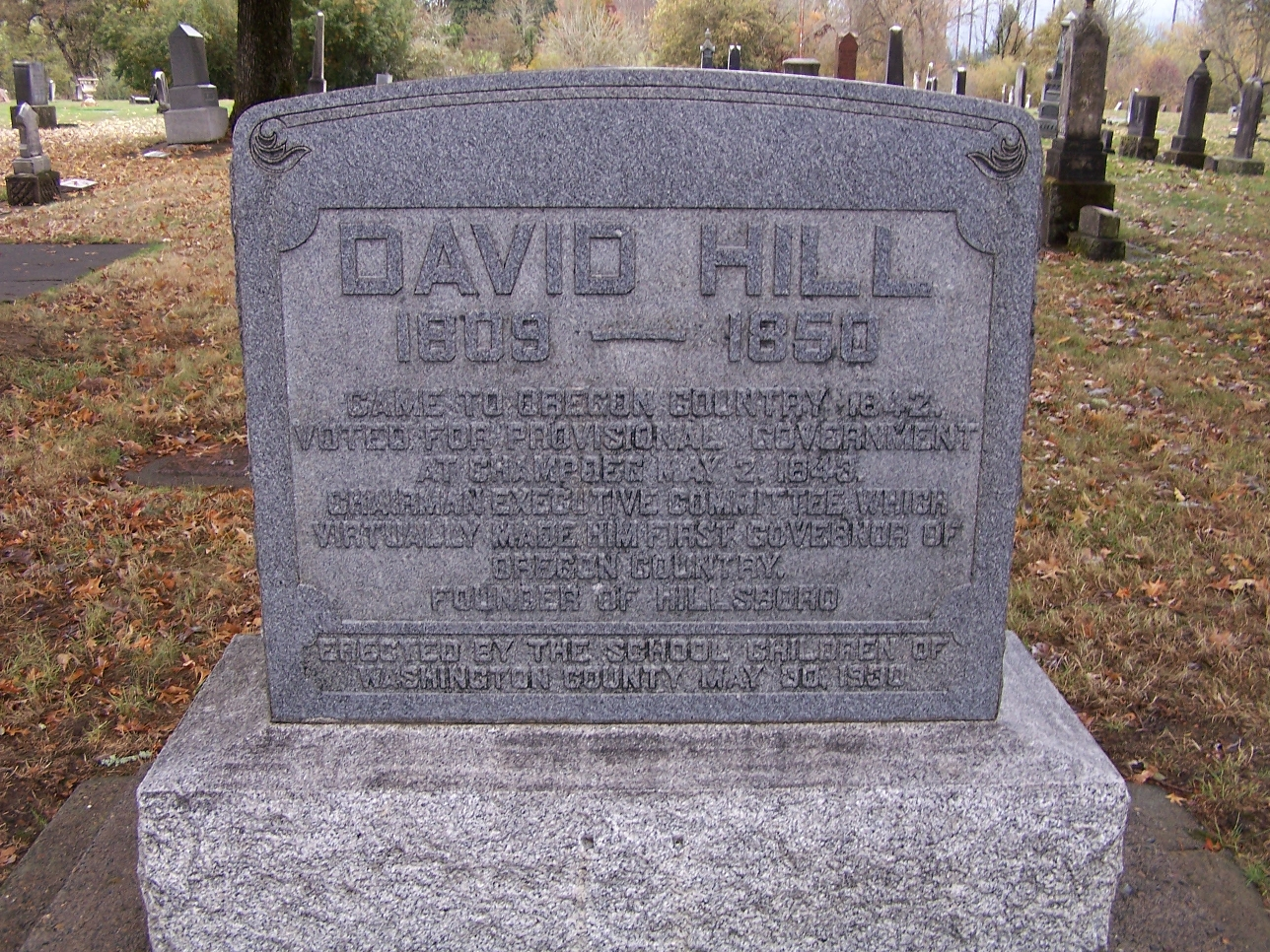
David Hill Gravemarker

=== Gravemarker ===
"David Hill
1809-1850
Came to Oregon Country 1842.
Voted for provisional government
at Champoeg May 2, 1843.
Chairman executive committee which
virtually made him first governor of
Oregon Country.
Founder of Hillsboro"

Preceded by None (Government established)	Executive Committee of the Provisional Government of Oregon; 1843-1844 with Alanson Beers; Joseph Gale	Replaced by Second Executive Committee with Osborne Russell; Peter G. Stewart; William J. Bailey
