= Beaver coins =

Former currency in Oregon, United States

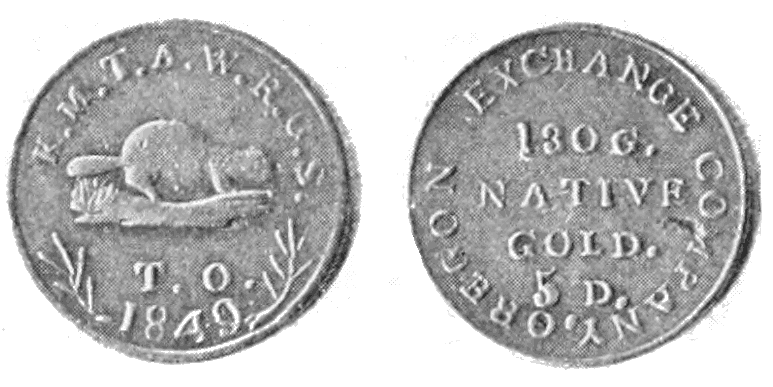
Oregon Territory $5 gold "beaver coin".

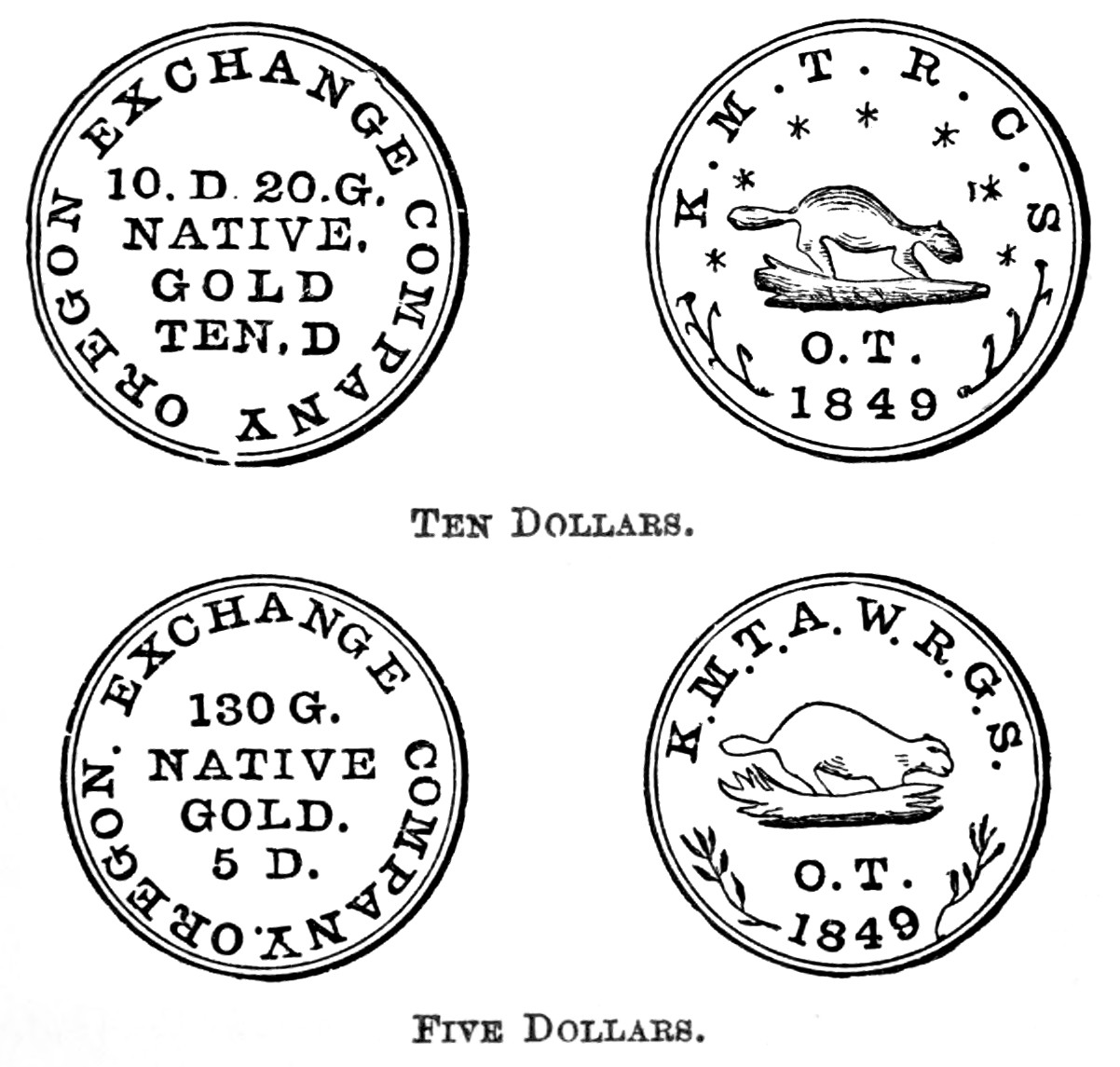
Sketch of Beaver Coins in both denominations

Beaver Coins, also known in pioneer days as Beaver Money, were gold coins minted in Oregon in 1849. Their name comes from the prominent beaver depicted on the obverse of the coins. The currency contained 8% more gold than contemporary coins from the United States of America. Today these coins are quite rare and valuable.

After the establishment of the Territory of Oregon, the mint producing the coins became an entirely private enterprise, continuing its operations until Governor Joseph Lane ruled the operation unconstitutional in September 1849. (Article I, Section 8 of the United States Constitution declares the mintage of coins to be one of the enumerated powers of the Congress.) The opening of the United States Mint branch in San Francisco, California made a large supply of gold and silver U.S. currency available, playing a part in the demise of the "Beaver Coins".

== Background ==
The primarily American settler population of the Oregon Country, based in the Willamette Valley since the late 1830s, lacked a stable currency. A variety of items were held valid by the Provisional Government of Oregon, including specie from Mexico and Peru, beaver skins and wheat. After the beginning of the California Gold Rush an estimated 2,000,000 dollars' worth of gold entered the Oregon settlements within two years. Disputes often arose during transactions over the value of the gold dust, generally rife with impurities.

== Oregon Exchange Company ==
The Provisional Legislature, after being petitioned by William Rector for the establishment of a mint, gave its approval for the plan. Legislators from Clackamas and Yamhill counties objected to the bill, stressing the illegality under the U.S. Constitution of private mints. Although the Oregon Exchange Company was a mostly private organization, the legislature appointed the officers to the Company, which included Governor George Abernethy. The proceeds of the mint were intended to fund the expenses from the ongoing Cayuse War.

The mint was open on 10 March 1849 in Oregon City, Oregon, eight days after the Territorial Governor Joseph Lane arrived in Oregon. Machinery used to create the coins was created by Rector and made of "old wagon tires and such scraps..." Designed after the North West Company trade tokens, the $5 and $10 Beaver Coins weighed 130 and 260 grains respectively. An estimated 8,850 coins of either denomination were produced until the closure of the mint.

== Legality of the coins ==
It was argued by the Provisional Government of the Oregon Territory that "necessity knows no laws". It could also be argued that during the Anglo-American joint occupation of Oregon, the territory was not officially part of either government, and any established government could act as it wished. However, after Oregon was officially organized as a U.S. Territory the coins were clearly unconstitutional. Governor Lane remedied this upon his examination of all the provisional government's laws, striking only the law calling for the minting of coinage.

The formal U.S. Government's reaction to the coins was to buy them up at a premium rate in exchange for U.S. currency. The coins were called up by the San Francisco Mint and taken out of circulation.

== See also ==
- Territorial gold – Gold token coins produced in U.S. territories at the time of the California Gold Rush
