= Mormon gold coinage =

19th-Century coins produced in Utah, United States

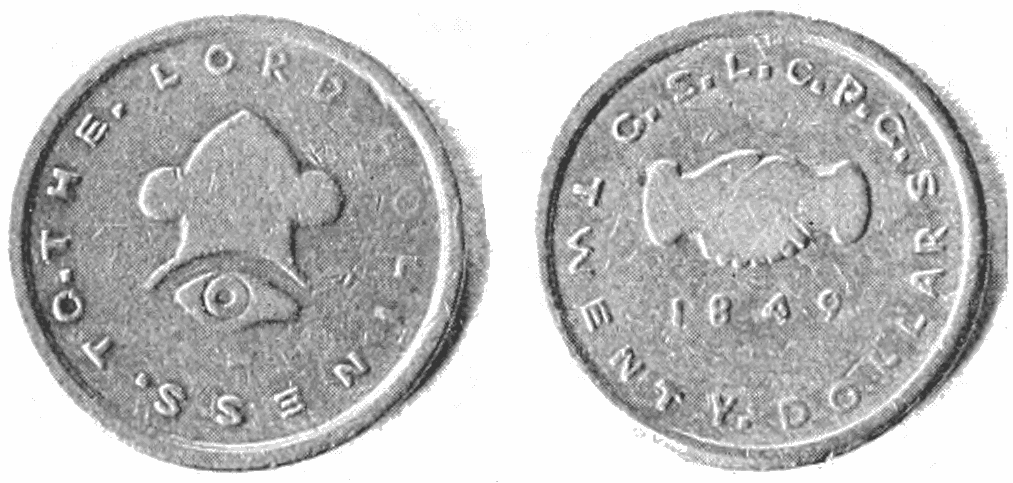
An 1849 $20 gold piece with a Phrygian cap above the "eye of Jehovah" on the obverse. "G. S. L. C. P. G." on the reverse stands for "Great Salt Lake City Pure Gold".

The Mormon gold coinage consisted of privately-issued tokens which the Church of Jesus Christ of Latter-day Saints struck from 1848 to 1860. They were issued in $2.50, $5, $10, and $20 denominations.

The first coins were minted in 1848 in Salt Lake City, with gold found at Mormon Island, California. About 4000 coins were made before Utah Territory governor Alfred Cumming ordered production to cease in 1861.

Some coins had an inscription in the Deseret alphabet: 𐐐𐐄𐐢𐐆𐐤𐐝 𐐓𐐅 𐐜 𐐢𐐃𐐡𐐔 ("Holiness to the Lord").

== See also ==
- Territorial gold
