= California gold coinage =

California gold rush currency

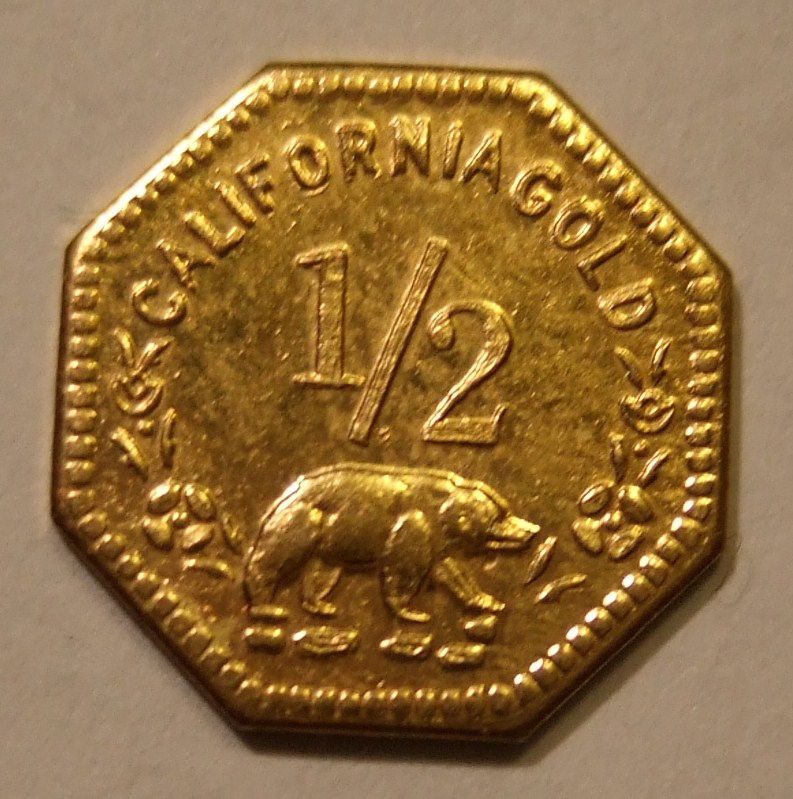
A gold plated California Gold token dated 1852 but struck in the 1960s

California gold coinage is a broad category of privately-issued coin-like items that were used in place of official currency in the United States territory (later state) of California during the gold rush of 1849. Since the federal government reserves the right to issue legal tender coins, California gold coinage is a misnomer and actually references coin-like ingots with a stated tender value, tokens with a stated tender value (denominated), and tokens without a stated tender value (non-denominated). These items are only classified as an ingot if the value of the metal was close to the tender value marked on the piece. In spite of the misnomer, it is common practice among numismatists to label coin-like ingots and denominated tokens as 'coins' while labeling the non-denominated tokens as 'tokens'. Also, the small California Gold coins and tokens have been made in many locations other than California, often with a claim of being from California on the piece and these items are generally labeled as California Gold Coins or Tokens.

Coin-like ingots were produced from 1849 until 1856 in denominations of $1, $5, $10, $20, $25, and $50. Many of these were made by well-known assayers. Some of these achieved circulation on the east coast of the United States. All are highly valued today.

Tokens with a stated tender value were produced from 1852 until 1883 as well as spuriously in later years. These were made in denominations of $1, $0.50, and $0.25 in both round and octagonal shapes. In the early period, from roughly 1852 through 1853, the coins were made for actual use due to a scarcity of silver coins. These coins were quickly rejected as being too small to handle, but simultaneously gained popularity for use as souvenirs that could be economically mailed to families. Although the earliest issues had about 80-90% of the correct weight for the denomination, the weights constantly decreased over the years of issue. Only the extremely rare "defiant eagle" issue has the full weight of gold.

Tokens without a stated tender value have been produced since 1869. The Coinage Act of 1864 made the private creation of items intended to be passed as legal tender to be illegal. This law was first enforced in an obscure case in Boston in 1869 and later enforced in a more public fashion at Ft. Leavenworth in 1871. At that time several manufacturers stopped production of the denominated pieces and new manufacturers stepped with a mix of denominated and non-denominated issues. After an overzealous visit from the United States Secret Service in 1883 (no charges were ever pressed), all of the remaining manufacturers switched to non-denominated issues. Since then issues have been produced, often with gold-rush era dates on them, more or less continuously through the present.

== See also ==
- Territorial gold
