= Territorial gold =

Gold token coins produced in U.S. territories at the time of the California Gold Rush

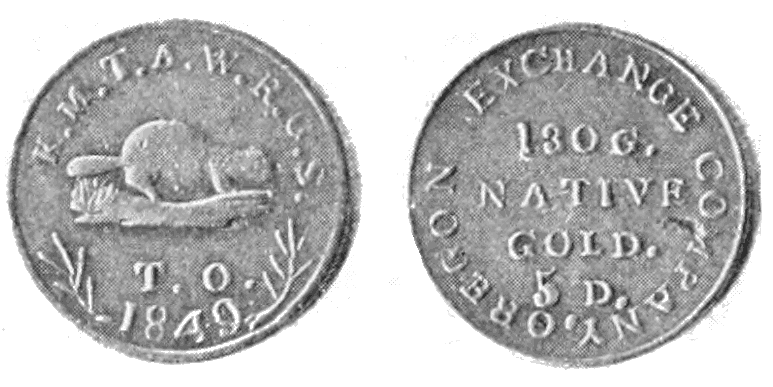
Oregon Territory $5 gold "beaver coin".

Territorial gold was the gold token coinage that began to be produced in U.S. territories at the time of the California Gold Rush. California gold coins were issued from 1849 to 1883; Mormon gold coinage in Utah Territory from 1848 to 1860; "beaver coins" in Oregon Territory in 1849; and gold coins in Colorado Territory from 1860 to 1861.
