= Lee Mission Cemetery =

Pioneer cemetery in Salem, Oregon

- U.S. National Register of Historic Places
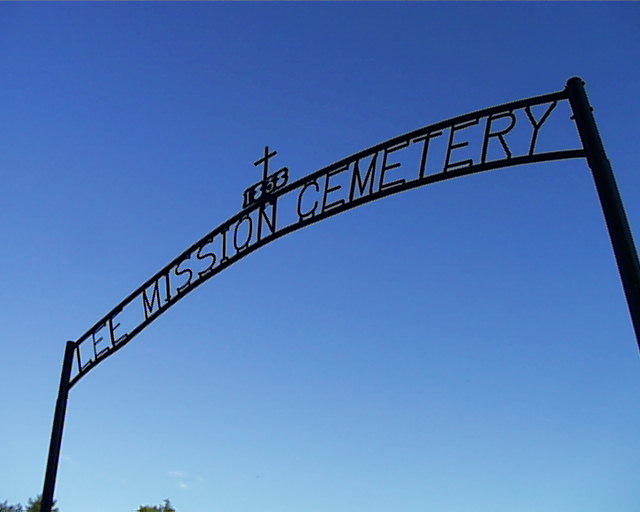
- Entrance gate at Lee Mission Cemetery
- Location: Salem, Oregon, United States
- Coordinates: 44°56′33″N 123°00′34″W
- Built: 1842
- NRHP reference No.: 78002299
- Added to NRHP: December 29, 1978

Lee Mission Cemetery is a pioneer cemetery in Salem, Oregon, United States.

== History ==
Lee Mission Cemetery was established in 1842 with the burial of Lucy Thompson Lee, the second wife of Rev. Jason Lee. The cemetery's gate has the date 1838, which is date of death for Anna Maria Pittman Lee, first wife of Jason Lee, and their infant son, who were moved to the cemetery shortly after Lucy's burial.

== Notable interments ==
- Alanson Beers
- Erastus Otis Haven
- Gustavus Hines
- Hallie Parrish Hinges
- Rev. Jason Lee
- Josiah Lamberson Parrish
- Jesse Quinn Thornton
- Alvin F. Waller
- Edward J. White
