= Executive Committee (Oregon Country) =

Defunct branch of the Provisional Government of Oregon

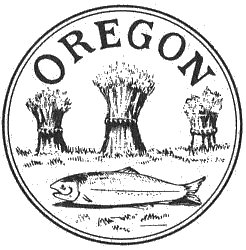
Seal of the Provisional Government

An Executive Committee was the title of a three-person committee which served as the executive Branch of the Provisional Government of Oregon in the disputed Oregon Country. This arrangement was announced on July 5, 1843, after three months of study by the Provisional Legislature at Champoeg.

== Powers ==
The executive committee was empowered to grant reprieves and pardons, recommend legislation, and call out the militia.

== Members of the First Executive Committee (1843–1844) ==
- David Hill – Pioneer from Connecticut, went on to become founder of Hillsboro, Oregon.
- Alanson Beers – Also from Connecticut. Methodist missionary with the Reverend Jason Lee's mission. Later a business partner of George Abernethy.
- Joseph Gale – Ship builder, sea captain and accomplished trader.

== Members of the Second Executive Committee (1844–1845) ==
- Peter G. Stewart – New York pioneer.
- Osborne Russell – Helped build Fort Hall in Idaho, fur trader, later candidate for Provisional Governor.
- William J. Bailey – Trapper and trader, later became a doctor.

Preceded by None (Government established)	Executive Committees of the Oregon Country; 1843–1845	Succeeded by George Abernethy
