= George Abernethy =

American politician

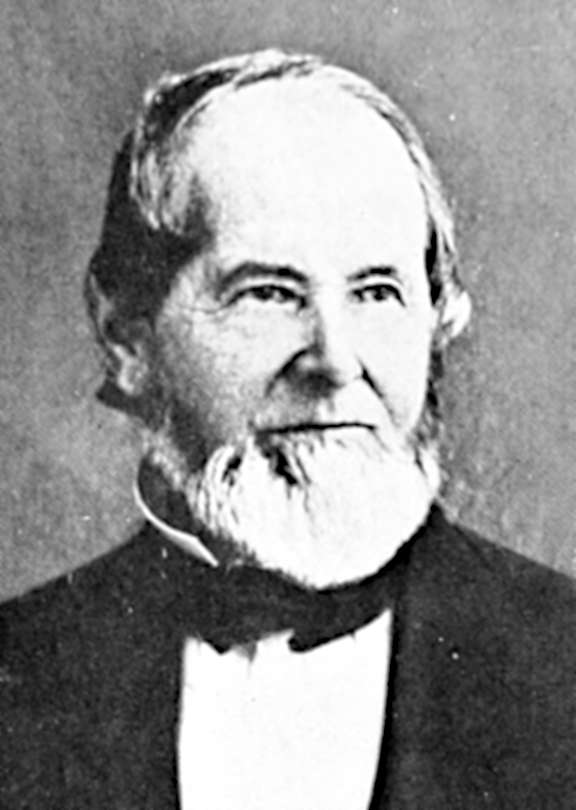

Governor of the Provisional Government of Oregon
- In office June 3, 1845 – March 3, 1849
- Preceded by: Second Executive Committee
- Succeeded by: Position dissolved (Joseph Lane as territorial governor)
- Constituency: Oregon Country

Personal details
- Born: October 7, 1807 New York City, U.S.
- Died: March 2, 1877 (aged 69) Portland, Oregon, U.S.
- Spouse: Anne Pope
- Relations: Henry C. Hodges (son-in-law) Henry Clay Hodges Jr. (grandson)
- Occupation: Merchant, politician

George Abernethy (October 7, 1807 – March 2, 1877) was an American politician, pioneer, entrepreneur, and first governor of Oregon under the provisional government based in the Willamette Valley, an area later a part of the American state of Oregon. He traveled to Oregon Country as a secular member of the Methodist mission, where he became involved in politics and helped found the first American newspaper west of the Rocky Mountains.

== Early life ==
Abernethy was born on October 7, 1807, in New York City to shoemaker William Abernethy and an unidentified mother. He was of Scottish descent. He received his education in New York as well as learning the commercial trade. In 1830, Abernethy married Anne Pope. Missionary Jason Lee recruited Abernethy in 1839 to join him at the Methodist Mission in Oregon Country. He, his wife, and two children joined the Great Reinforcement that sailed on the ship Lausanne around Cape Horn to the Pacific Northwest.

== Oregon ==
Arriving on June 1, 1840, Abernethy was placed in charge as Steward of the Oregon Mission, focusing on the Mission's mercantile business in Oregon City. His specific instructions from the Methodist board requested an annual

account of all the goods, merchandise, clothing, farming and mechanical utensils, the produce of the farms, and the mechanical shops, the stock on the farm at a fair valuation, together with the worth of the houses, barns, mills, and shops, or whatever else may belong to the Mission, and likewise charge to each member of the Mission family the article or articles he or she may take from the store or farms for his or her use ...

Among his early accomplishments were establishing the first newspaper (the Oregon Spectator) in the Oregon Territory and establishing good business relations with the British Hudson's Bay Company. Abernethy was also a member of the Oregon Lyceum in Oregon City. In 1842 he introduced a resolution there to hold off forming an independent country. This was adopted and counter-acted a resolution introduced by Dr. John McLoughlin of the HBC that had earlier been adopted by the Lyceum.

=== Governor ===
On June 3, 1845, Abernethy was elected to serve as Provisional Governor of the Oregon Country, defeating Osborne Russell, a member of the outgoing Executive Committee. Abernethy and his supporters were American loyalists who believed that the Provisional Government was strictly interim until the question of U.S. and British claims on the Oregon Country were finalized. Russell, however, headed up the "Independents" faction which wished to create a Republic of the Pacific.

As provisional governor, Abernethy worked to build roads, levied the first property taxes, and sent representatives of the Provisional Government to Washington, D.C., to lobby for official U.S. territorial status. He was reelected in 1847 with the endorsement of the influential Dr. John McLoughlin over Asa Lovejoy, co-founder of Portland.

Among the more interesting prerogatives of Abernethy was his solution to the shortage of U.S. currency throughout the territory. He and eight other leading citizens established the Oregon Exchange Company, which became the de facto territorial mint for a short time. The organization minted the now-rare five dollar and ten dollar "Beaver Coins", making Oregon one of the few U.S. territories to ever mint its own currency.

The Abernethy administration technically ended when efforts to gain territorial status came to fruition on August 14, 1848. President James K. Polk signed the Oregon Territory Act, and appointed General Joseph Lane as the first official territorial governor. Abernethy continued to carry out his duties until Governor Lane arrived at Oregon City March 3, 1849.

== Later life and legacy ==
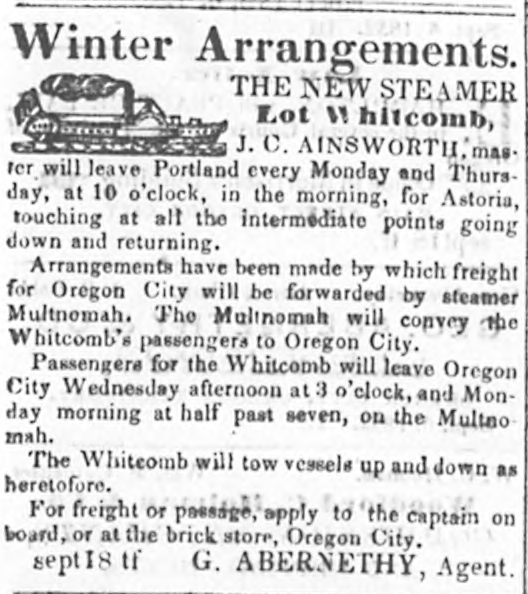
Advertisement for steamer Lot Whitcomb, naming George Abernethy as agent

After leaving office, Abernethy continued doing well in his business. Among other things he served as the Oregon City agent for the pioneer steamer Lot Whitcomb, the first steam-powered vessel built on the Willamette River and the second one built in the entire Oregon Country. Abernethy's assets were destroyed during the flood of 1861. He moved to Portland shortly after. He died in 1877 at 70 years of age. Abernethy was buried at River View Cemetery.

Today, the Abernethy Bridge in Oregon City is named in his honor. The end of the Oregon Trail, also in Oregon City, lies near an area known as Abernethy Green. Several other public works (and natural features such as streams) in Oregon are also named in his honor; though several are given the variant spelling of Abernathy.

== See also ==
- Oregon Rifles

Political offices
Preceded by Second Executive Committee^{1}	Governor of Provisional Government of Oregon; 1845-1848	Succeeded by Joseph Lane
Notes and references
1. Executive committees were three-person boards which served as executives for a one-year term.
