= Oregon Country =

Early-19th-century U.S. fur trade district in North America

- 1818–1846
- American and Hudson's Bay Company flags were used.

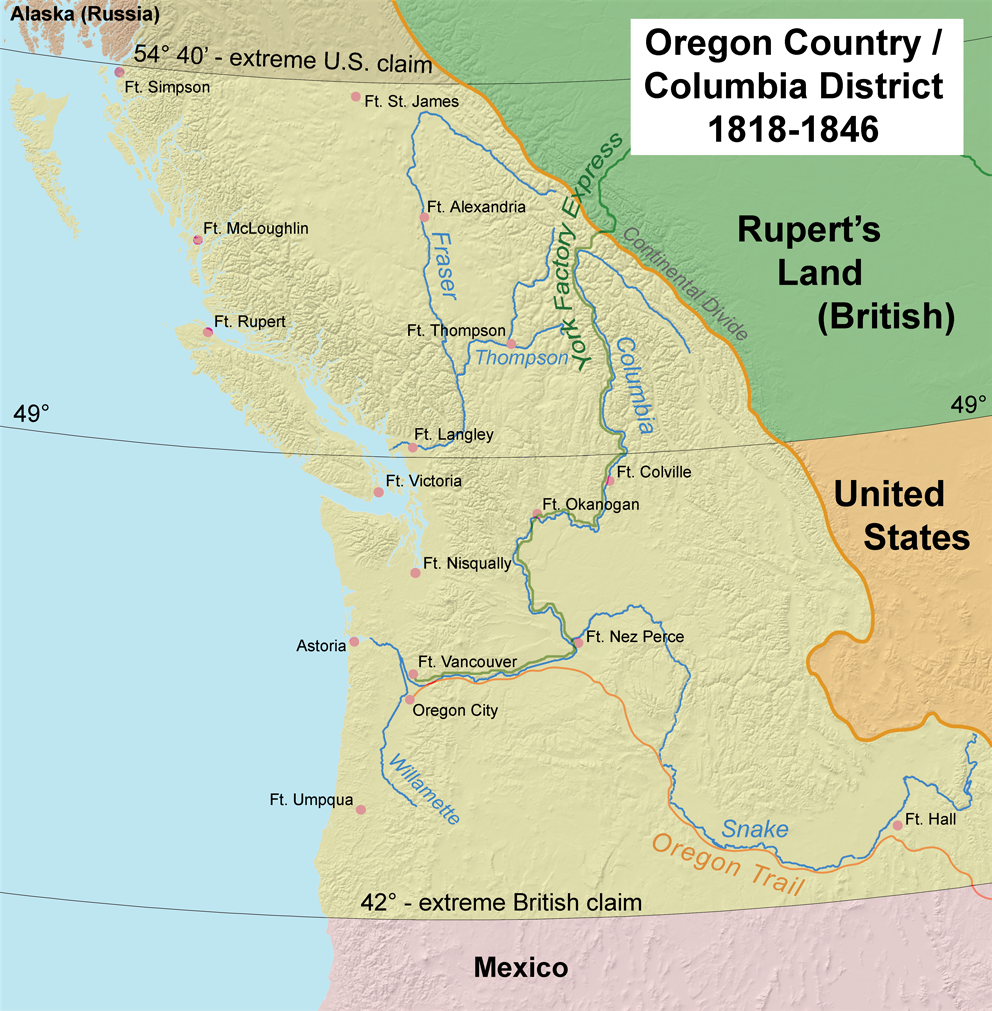
- Capital: Oregon City (US); Fort Vancouver (British)

Government
  - (British; 1818–1822): Governor Joseph Berens of Hudson's Bay Company
  - (British; 1822–1846): Governor John Pelly of Hudson's Bay Company
  - (U.S.; 1841–1843): Supreme Judge Ira Babcock
  - (U.S.; 1843–1845): Executive Committee
  - (U.S.; 1845–1846): Governor George Abernethy
- History
  - Established: October 20, 1818
  - North West Company merges with Hudson's Bay Company: July 1821
  - Fort Vancouver built: 1824
  - Oregon City built: 1829
  - U.S. Constitutional Committee: February 18, 1841
  - U.S. Provisional Government: May 2, 1843
  - Organic Laws of Oregon: July 5, 1843
  - George Abernethy becomes Governor: June 3, 1845
  - Oregon Treaty: June 15, 1846
- Currency: Beaver skin
Preceded by
New Spain
Spanish expeditions to the Pacific Northwest
Succeeded by
Provisional Government of Oregon
Colony of Vancouver Island
Colony of the Queen Charlotte Islands
New Caledonia (Canada)
North-Western Territory

Oregon Country was a large region of the Pacific Northwest of North America that was subject to a long dispute between the United Kingdom and the United States in the early 19th century. The area, which had been demarcated by the Treaty of 1818, consisted of the land north of 42° N latitude, south of 54°40′ N latitude, and west of the Rocky Mountains down to the Pacific Ocean and east to the Continental Divide. Article III of the 1818 treaty gave joint control to both nations for ten years, allowed land to be claimed, and guaranteed free navigation to all mercantile trade. However, both countries disputed the terms of the international treaty. Oregon Country was the American name, while the British used Columbia District for the region.

Fur traders had entered Oregon Country prior to 1810, which led to the foundation of the Provisional Government of Oregon. Its coastal areas north of the Columbia River were frequented by ships from all nations engaged in the maritime fur trade, with many vessels between the 1790s and 1810s coming from Boston. The Hudson's Bay Company, whose Columbia Department comprised most of the Oregon Country and north into New Caledonia and beyond 54°40′ N, with operations reaching tributaries of the Yukon River, managed and represented British interests in the region.

After the dispute became an election issue in the 1844 U.S. presidential election, the United Kingdom and the United States agreed to settle the problem with the Oregon Treaty in 1846. It established the British-American boundary at the 49th parallel (except Vancouver Island). With the end of joint occupancy, the region south of the 49th parallel became Oregon Territory in the United States while the northern portion became part of the British colonies of British Columbia and Vancouver Island. The area that made up Oregon Country now lies within the present-day borders of the Canadian province of British Columbia and the entirety of the U.S. states of Oregon, Washington, and Idaho, as well as parts of Montana and Wyoming.

Throughout this period, the Oregon Country was inhabited by numerous independent Indigenous peoples, who received little recognition by the British or American governments in the eventual disposition of the territory. Native traders nevertheless played a critical role in the ongoing fur trade that formed the Oregon Country's primary economic activity until mid-century, and the regional trade language Chinook Jargon began to serve as the lingua franca between Indigenous groups and the small European population during and after the 1818–1846 period. This was the last period in which the Oregon Country's Indian nations retained a sizeable majority in their land, prior to the rapid and devastating arrival of smallpox in the 1860s, and were able to maintain relative economic independence thanks to the necessity of their hunting skills in the fur trade. The eventual partition of the Oregon Country into national domains by the two colonial powers, increasing settlement, and the drastic decline of the fur trade due to diminishing supply all contributed to catastrophic decline in Indian population after 1846, and the arbitrary seizure of their land over the following two decades in the interests of newly arrived settlers.

== Early exploration ==
George Vancouver explored Puget Sound in 1792. Vancouver claimed it for Great Britain on June 4, 1792, naming it for one of his officers, Lieutenant Peter Puget. Alexander Mackenzie was the first European to cross North America by land north of New Spain, arriving at Bella Coola on what is now the central coast of British Columbia in 1793. From 1805 to 1806, Meriwether Lewis and William Clark explored the territory of the United States on the Lewis and Clark Expedition.

David Thompson, working for the Montreal-based North West Company, explored much of the region beginning in 1807 with his friend and colleague Simon Fraser, following the Fraser River to its mouth in 1808, attempting to ascertain whether it was the Columbia, as had been theorized about its northern reaches through New Caledonia, where it was known by its Dakleh name as the "Tacoutche Tesse". Thompson was the first European to voyage down the entire length of the Columbia River. Along the way, his party camped at the junction with the Snake River on July 9, 1811. He erected a pole and a notice claiming the country for the United Kingdom and stating the intention of the North West Company to build a trading post on the site. Later in 1811, on the same expedition, he finished his survey of the entire Columbia, arriving at a partially constructed Fort Astoria two months after the departure of John Jacob Astor's ill-fated Tonquin.

== Territorial evolution ==
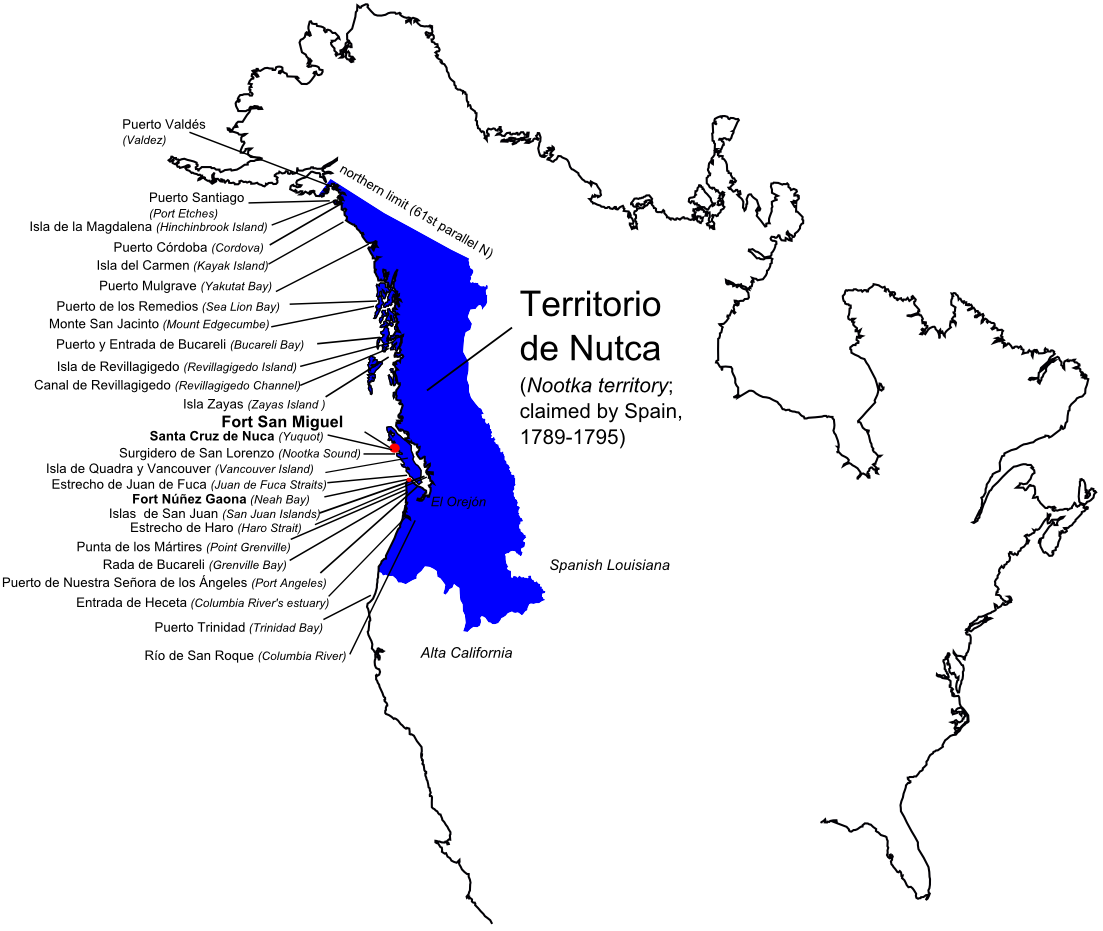
Spanish territorial claims on the West Coast of North America in the 18th century

The Oregon Country was originally claimed by Great Britain, France, Russia, and Spain; the Spanish claim was later taken up by the United States. The extent of the region being claimed was vague at first, evolving over decades into the specific borders specified in the U.S.-British treaty of 1818. The United States based its claim in part on Robert Gray's entry of the Columbia River in 1792 and the Lewis and Clark Expedition. Great Britain based its claim in part on British overland explorations of the Columbia River by David Thompson and on prior discovery and exploration along the coast. Spain's claim was based on the Inter caetera and Treaty of Tordesillas of 1493–94, as well as explorations of the Pacific coast in the late 18th century. Russia based its claim on its explorations and trading activities in the region. It asserted its ownership of the region north of the 51st parallel by the Ukase of 1821, which was quickly challenged by the other powers and withdrawn to 54°40′N by separate treaties with the U.S. and Britain in 1824 and 1825, respectively.

Spain gave up its claims of exclusivity via the Nootka Conventions of the 1790s. In the Nootka Conventions, which followed the Nootka Crisis, Spain granted Britain rights to the Pacific Northwest. However, it did not establish a northern boundary for Spanish California, nor did it extinguish Spanish rights to the Pacific Northwest. Spain later relinquished any remaining claims to territory north of the 42nd parallel to the United States as part of the Adams-Onís Treaty of 1819. In the 1820s, Russia gave up its claims south of 54°40′ and east of the 141st meridian in separate treaties with the United States and Britain.

Meanwhile, the United States and Britain negotiated the Anglo-American Convention of 1818, which extended the boundary between their territories west along the 49th parallel to the Rocky Mountains. The two countries agreed to "joint occupancy" of the land west of the Rockies to the Pacific Ocean.

In 1843, settlers established their government, called the Provisional Government of Oregon. A legislative committee drafted a code of laws known as the Organic Law. It included the creation of an executive committee of three, a judiciary, a militia, land laws, and four counties. There was vagueness and confusion over the nature of the 1843 Organic Law, in particular, whether it was constitutional or statutory. In 1844, a new legislative committee decided to consider it statutory. The 1845 Organic Law made additional changes, including allowing the participation of British subjects in the government. Although the Oregon Treaty of 1846 settled the boundaries of U.S. jurisdiction, the provisional government continued to function until 1849, when the first governor of Oregon Territory arrived. A faction of Oregon politicians hoped to continue Oregon's political evolution into an independent nation, but the pressure to join the United States prevailed by 1848, four months after the Mexican–American War.

== Early settlement ==
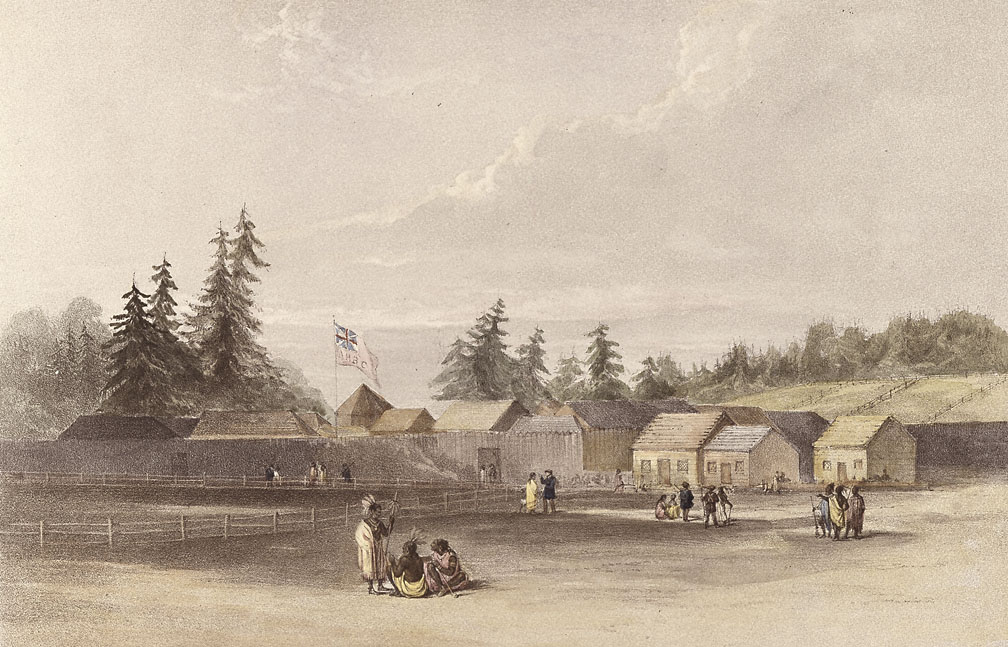
Fort Vancouver in 1845

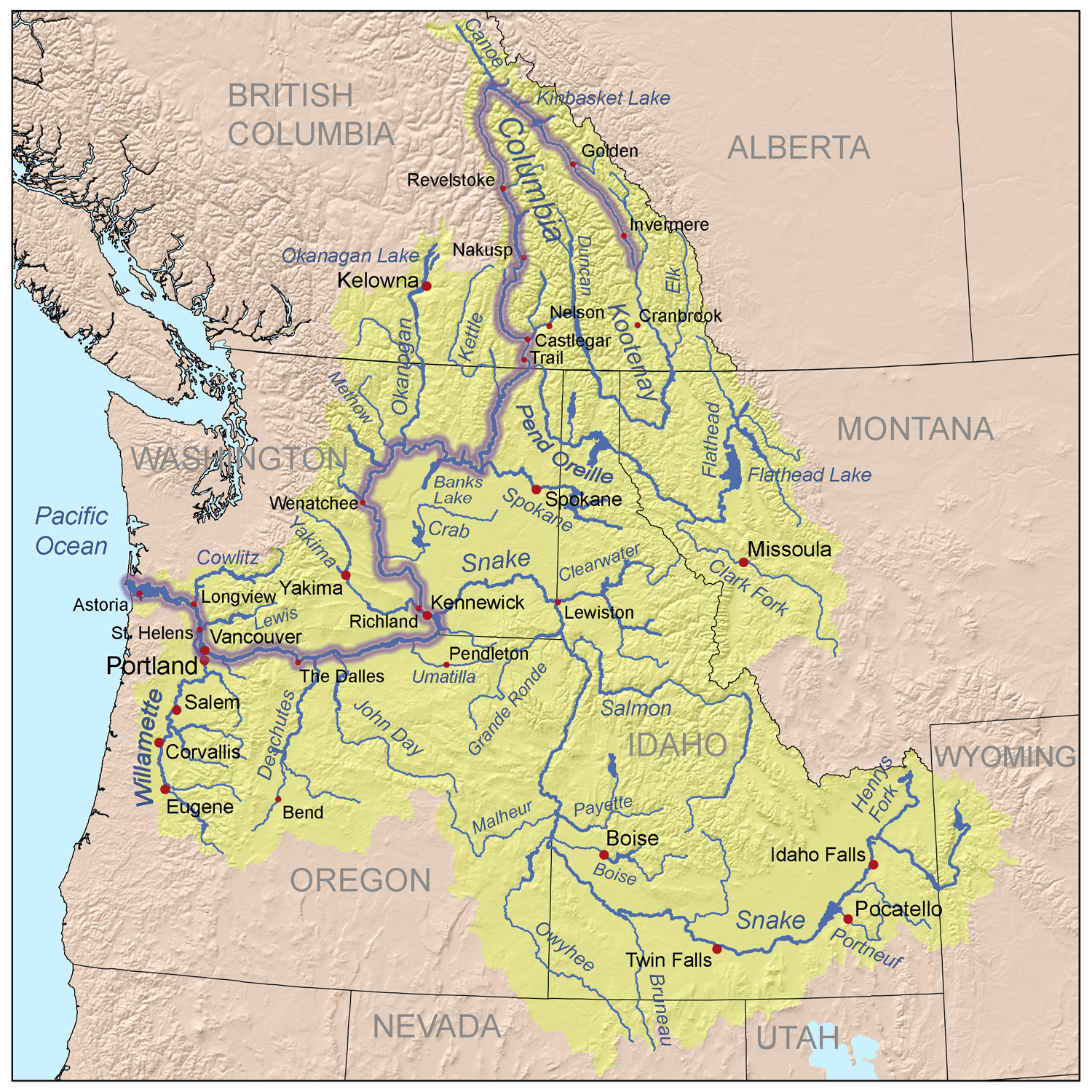
The Columbia River and its tributaries, showing modern political boundaries. In 1811 David Thompson navigated its entire length.

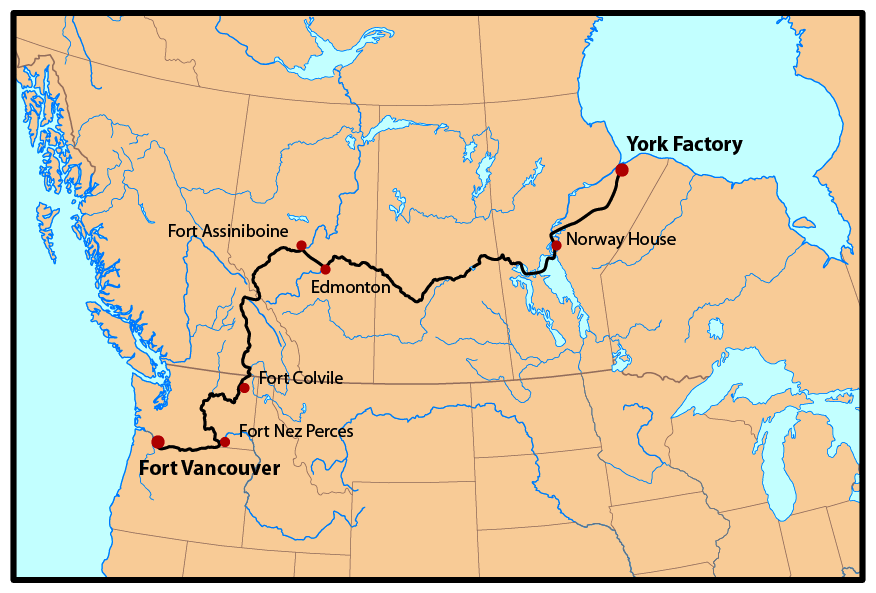
Route of the York Factory Express, 1820s to 1840s, with modern political boundaries shown

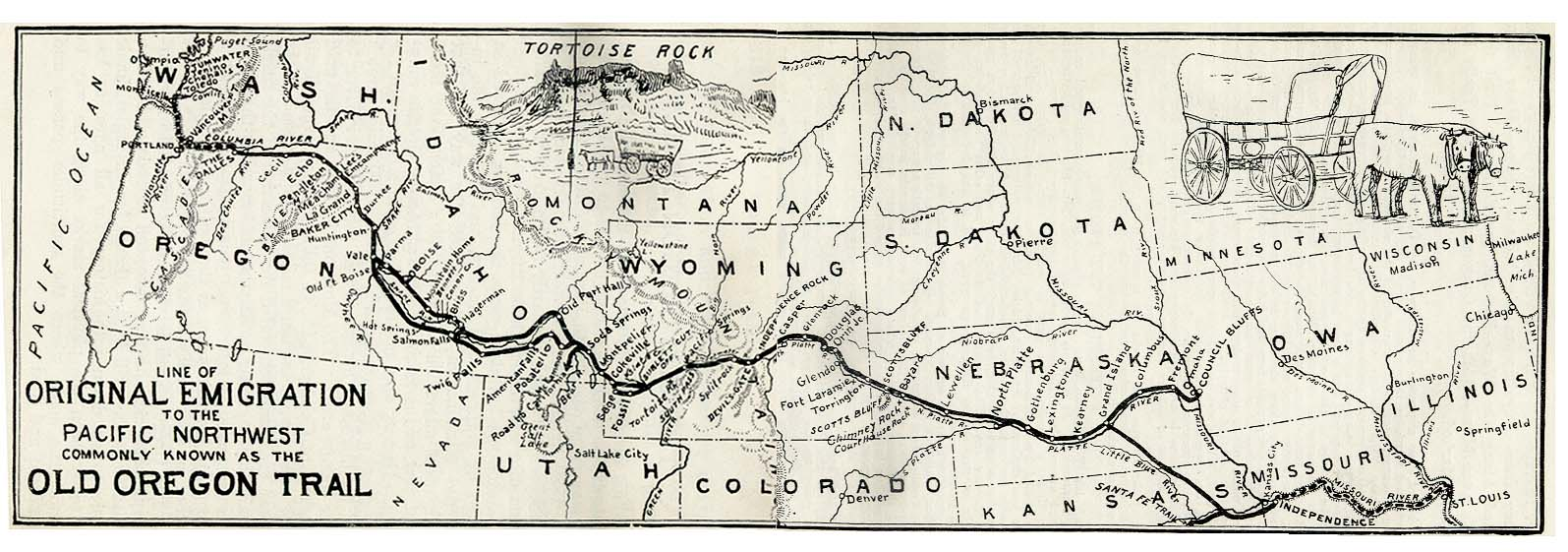
The Oregon trail started in St. Louis, Missouri.

In 1805, the American Lewis and Clark Expedition marked the first official American exploration of the area, creating the first temporary settlement of Euro-Americans in the area near the mouth of the Columbia River at Fort Clatsop. Two years later, in 1807, David Thompson of the Montreal-based North West Company penetrated the Oregon Country from the north via Athabasca Pass, near the headwaters of the Columbia River. From there he navigated nearly the full length of the river through to the Pacific Ocean.

In 1810, John Jacob Astor commissioned and began the construction of the American Pacific Fur Company fur-trading post at Fort Astoria, just 5 miles (8 kilometers) from the site of Lewis and Clark's former Fort Clatsop, completing construction of the first permanent Euro-American settlement in the area in 1811. This settlement later became the nucleus of present-day Astoria, Oregon. During the construction of Fort Astoria, Thompson traveled down the Columbia River, noting the partially constructed American Fort Astoria only two months after the departure of the supply ship Tonquin.

Along the way, Thompson had set foot on and claimed for the British Crown the lands near the future Fort Nez Percés site at the confluence of the Columbia and Snake rivers. This claim initiated a very brief era of competition between American and British fur traders. During the War of 1812, Fort Astoria was captured by the British and sold to the North West Company. Under British control, Fort Astoria was renamed Fort George.

In 1821, when the North West Company was merged with the Hudson's Bay Company, the British Parliament moved to impose the laws of Upper Canada upon British subjects in Columbia District and Rupert's Land and issued the authority to enforce those laws to the Hudson's Bay Company. Chief Factor John McLoughlin was appointed manager of the district's operations in 1824. He moved the regional company headquarters to Fort Vancouver (modern Vancouver, Washington) in 1824. Fort Vancouver became the centre of a thriving colony of mixed origin, including Scottish Canadians and Scots, English, French Canadians, Hawaiians, Algonkians, and Iroquois, as well as the offspring of company employees who had intermarried with various local native populations.

Astor continued to compete for Oregon Country furs through his American Fur Company operations in the Rockies. In the 1820s, a few American explorers and traders visited this land beyond the Rocky Mountains. Long after the Lewis and Clark Expedition and also after the consolidation of the fur trade in the region by the Canadian fur companies, American mountain men such as Jedediah Smith and Jim Beckwourth came roaming into and across the Rocky Mountains, following Indian trails through the Rockies to California and Oregon. They sought beaver pelts and other furs, which were obtained by trapping. These were difficult to obtain in the Oregon Country because of the Hudson's Bay Company policy of creating a "fur desert": deliberate over-hunting of the area's frontiers so that American trades would find nothing there. The mountain men, like the Metis employees of the Canadian fur companies, adopted Indian ways, and many of them married Native American women.

Reports of Oregon Country eventually circulated in the eastern United States. Some churches decided to send missionaries to convert the Indians. Jason Lee, a Methodist minister from New York, was the first Oregon missionary. He built a mission school for Indians in the Willamette Valley in 1834. American settlers began to arrive from the east via the Oregon Trail starting in the early 1840s and came in increasing numbers each subsequent year. Increased tension led to the Oregon boundary dispute. Both sides realized that settlers would ultimately decide who controlled the region. The Hudson's Bay Company, which had previously discouraged settlement as it conflicted with the lucrative fur trade, belatedly reversed its position. In 1841, on orders from Sir George Simpson, James Sinclair guided more than 100 settlers from the Red River Colony to settle on HBC farms near Fort Vancouver. The Sinclair expedition crossed the Rockies into the Columbia Valley, near present-day Radium Hot Springs, British Columbia, then traveled southwest down the Kootenai River and Columbia River following the southern portion of the well-established York Factory Express trade route.

The Canadian effort proved to be too little, too late. In what was dubbed "The Great Migration of 1843" or the "Wagon Train of 1843", an estimated 700 to 1,000 American emigrants came to Oregon, decisively tipping the balance.

== Oregon Treaty ==
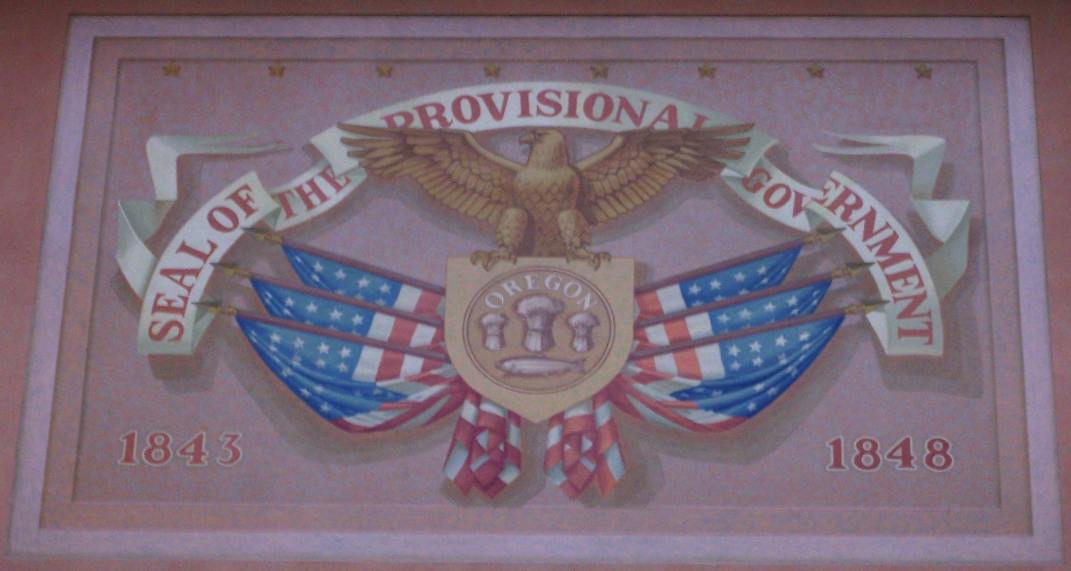
Mural on the walls of the Oregon Capitol Building depicting the provisional government seal

In 1843, settlers in the Willamette Valley established a provisional government at Champoeg. Political pressure in the United States urged the occupation of all the Oregon Country. Expansionists in the American South wanted to annex Texas, while their counterparts in the northeast wanted to annex the Oregon Country. It was seen as significant that the expansions be parallel, as the relative proximity to other states and territories made it appear likely that Texas would be pro-slavery and Oregon against slavery.

In the 1844 U.S. Presidential election, the Democrats had called for expansion into both areas. After being elected president, however, James K. Polk supported the 49th parallel as a northern limit for U.S. annexation in Oregon Country. Polk's uncompromising support for expansion into Texas and relative silence on the Oregon boundary dispute led to the phrase "Fifty-Four Forty or Fight!" referring to the northern border of the region and often erroneously attributed to Polk's campaign. The goal of the slogan was to rally Southern expansionists (some of whom wanted to annex only Texas in an effort to tip the balance of slave/free states and territories in favor of slavery) to support the effort to annex Oregon Country, appealing to the popular belief in manifest destiny. The British government, meanwhile, sought control of all territory north of the Columbia River.

Despite the posturing, neither country wanted to fight what would have been the third war in 70 years against the other. The two countries eventually reached a peaceful agreement in the 1846 Oregon Treaty that divided the territory west of the Continental Divide along the 49th parallel to Georgia Strait, with Vancouver Island remaining under British control. Today, this border divides British Columbia from neighboring Washington, Idaho, and Montana.

=== Hudson's Bay Company ===
In 1843, the HBC shifted its Columbia Department headquarters from Fort Vancouver to Fort Victoria on Vancouver Island. The plan to move to more northern locations dates back to the 1820s. George Simpson was the main force behind the move north; John McLoughlin became the main hindrance. McLoughlin had devoted his life's work to the Columbia business, and his personal interests were increasingly linked to the growing settlements in the Willamette Valley. He fought Simpson's proposals to move north in vain. By the time Simpson decided in 1842 to move the headquarters to Vancouver Island, he had many reasons for doing so. There was a dramatic decline in the fur trade across North America. In contrast, the HBC saw increasing profits with coastal exports of salmon and lumber to Pacific markets such as Hawaii. Coal deposits on Vancouver Island had been discovered, and steamships such as the Beaver had shown the growing value of coal economically and strategically. A general HBC shift toward Pacific shipping and away from the interior of the continent made Victoria Harbour much more suitable than Fort Vancouver's location on the Columbia River. The Columbia Bar at the river's mouth was dangerous and routinely meant weeks or months of waiting for ships to cross. The largest ships could not enter the river at all. The growing numbers of American settlers along the lower Columbia gave Simpson reason to question the long-term security of Fort Vancouver. He worried, rightfully so, that the final border resolution would not follow the Columbia River. By 1842, he thought it more likely that the United States would at least demand Puget Sound, and the British government would accept a border as far north as the 49th parallel, excluding Vancouver Island. Despite McLoughlin's stalling, the HBC had begun the process of shifting away from Fort Vancouver and toward Vancouver Island and the northern coast in the 1830s. The increasing number of American settlers arriving in the Willamette Valley after 1840 served to make the need more pressing.

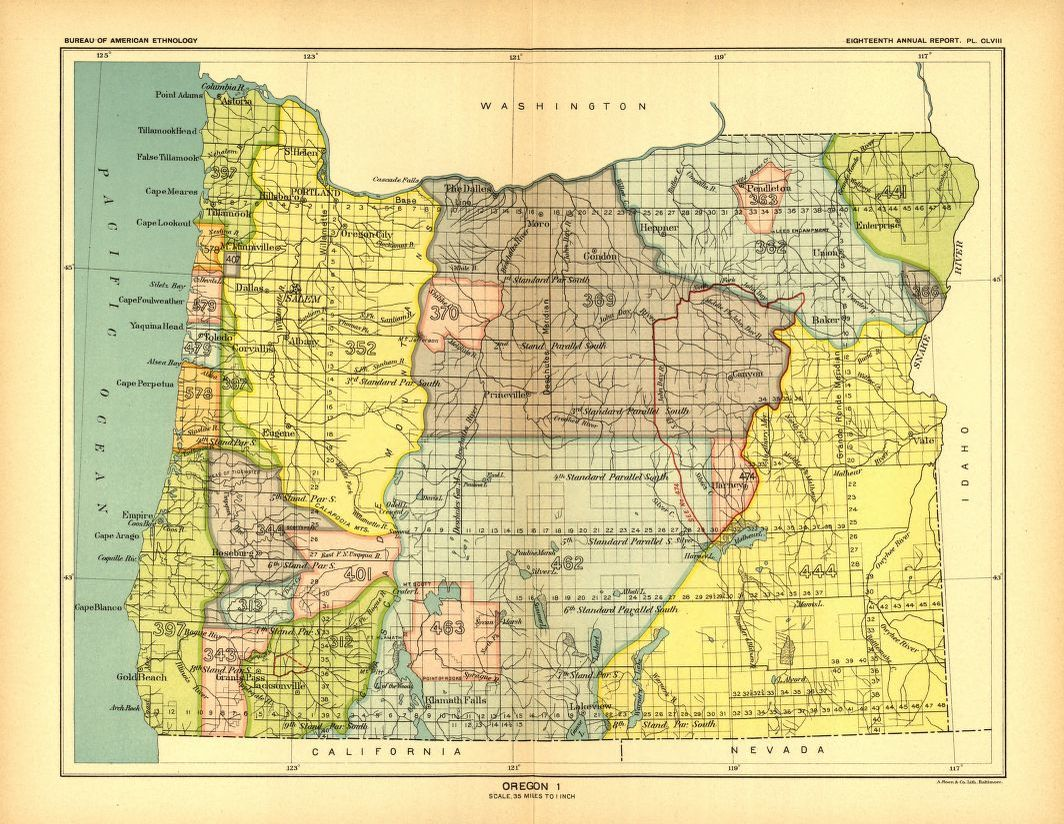
Oregon map from Indian land cessions in the United States (1899)

=== Oregon Territory ===
In 1848, the U.S. portion of the Oregon Country was formally organized as the Oregon Territory. In 1849, Vancouver Island became a British Crown colony—the Colony of Vancouver Island—with the mainland being organized into the Colony of British Columbia in 1858. Shortly after the establishment of Oregon Territory, there was an effort to split off the region north of the Columbia River. As a result of the Monticello Convention, Congress approved the creation of Washington Territory in early 1853. President Millard Fillmore approved the new territory on March 2, 1853.

== Descriptions of the land and settlers ==
Alexander Ross, an early Scottish Canadian fur trader, describes the lower reaches of the Willamette River, in the south of the Oregon Country (known to him as the Columbia District):

The banks of the river throughout are low and skirted in the distance by a chain of moderately high lands on each side, interspersed here and there with clumps of wide spreading oaks, groves of pine, and a variety of other kinds of woods. Between these high lands lie what is called the valley of the Wallamitte [sic], the frequented haunts of innumerable herds of elk and deer ... In ascending the river, the surrounding country is most delightful, and the first barrier to be met with is about forty miles up from its mouth. Here the navigation is interrupted by a ledge of rocks, running across the river from side to side in the form of an irregular horseshoe, over which the whole body of water falls at one leap down a precipice of about forty feet, called the Falls.

After living in Oregon from 1843 to 1848, Peter H. Burnett wrote:

[Oregonians] were all honest, because there was nothing to steal; they were all sober, because there was no liquor to drink; there were no misers, because there was no money to hoard; and they were all industrious, because it was work or starve.

== See also ==
- American frontier
- Bibliography of Oregon history
- Canada–United States border
- American imperialism
- Cascadia (independence movement), a contemporary movement to make the Cascadian bioregion, roughly covering the same area as the Oregon country, an independent country
- New Albion
- Robert Gray's Columbia River expedition
- Royal Proclamation of 1763 – another British-border treaty dependent on one or more hydrology divides to determine at least one of its borders
- Russo-American Treaty of 1824
- Treaty of Saint Petersburg (1825)

== Bibliography ==
- Richard W. Etulain, Lincoln and Oregon Country Politics in the Civil War. Corvallis, OR: Oregon State University Press, 2013.
