= Oregon pioneer history =

Account of the founders Oregon

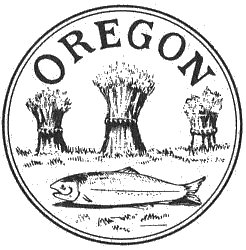
Provisional Government of Oregon Salmon Seal.

Oregon pioneer history (1806–1890) is the period in the history of Oregon Country and Oregon Territory, in the present day state of Oregon and Northwestern United States.

It was the era when pioneers and mountain men, primarily of European descent, traveled west across North America to explore and settle the lands west of the Rocky Mountains and north of California. Some also arrived via the Pacific Ocean, traveling by ship either around Cape Horn or by changing ships at Panama. The period begins after the explorations of the lower Columbia River by Robert Gray and George Vancouver in 1792, along with the 1804–1806 Lewis and Clark Expedition to Oregon Country, and runs until circa 1890 when railroads and urban centers created a more settled state.

== Territory ==
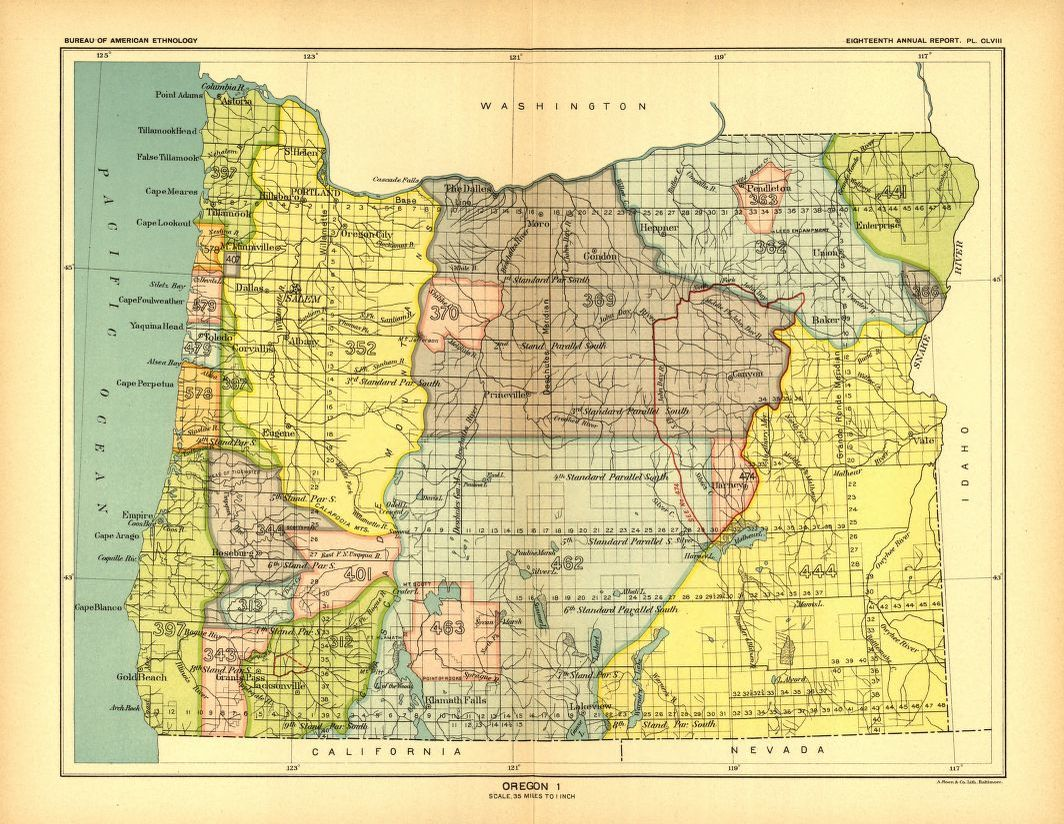
Oregon map from Indian Land Cessions in the United States

At the beginning of the pioneer period the Oregon Country was the homeland of numerous tribes of Native Americans. Portions of the area were claimed by the United States, Great Britain, Spain, and Russia. From 1818 to the mid-19th century, several treaties were signed that would set the current political boundaries. In 1818, the United States and Great Britain signed the Treaty of 1818 that led to what has been termed a "joint occupation" of the Oregon Country. Also in 1818 the U.S. resolved its claims with Spain regarding the western Louisiana Purchase lands, limiting Spanish claims to colonial Alta California south of the 42nd degree of latitude. This was followed by the Russo-American Treaty in 1825 that removed all remaining Russian-American Company claims south of 54' 40" (previously resolved with the British, regarding claims with Great Britain only). The remaining territorial conflict between British and U.S. claims continued until 1846 when the Oregon Treaty settled the boundary issue with the 49th degree of latitude set as the international boundary between the United States and Britain's North American possessions. However, due to some ambiguity in the treaty, future conflict did arise and ended with the bloodless Pig War over the San Juan Islands.

The portion that became part of the United States in 1846 remained unorganized until Congress created the Oregon Territory in August 1848. In 1853, the northern boundary of the current state of Oregon was defined, with roughly half of the original Oregon Territory becoming the Washington Territory. The boundaries were finalized for Oregon upon entering the Union as the 33rd state on February 14, 1859. The remaining northeastern portion of the territory became part of the Washington Territory. In 1863, Idaho Territory was created from the eastern section of the Washington Territory, with other former eastern portions of the Oregon Territory becoming parts of Montana Territory and Wyoming Territory. Washington became a state in 1889, followed by Idaho in 1890.

=== Government ===
Various Native American tribes inhabited the region at the beginning of the pioneer settlement period. Each tribe had their own forms of government, but no modern nation existed. The first formal government in the region came in the form of the Hudson's Bay Company, who were granted the authority by their charter to in effect rule over the region's British subjects. Thus the HBC was the de facto government for much of the region until U.S. settlers eventually outnumbered the British in the region.

Beginning in 1841 with the death of Ewing Young, settlers in the Willamette Valley held a series of meetings at Champoeg, Oregon. Eventually, in 1843 the majority of participants voted to create a government to rule over the pioneers until the boundary question would be settled. This temporary government had a supreme judge, a legislature, and at first an executive committee followed later by a governor. This government remained in control of portions of the region until 1849 when the United States' territorial government arrived.

Beginning in 1849, the Oregon Territorial Legislature began meeting and passing laws, with the Provisional Government's laws remaining in effect unless a new law was passed (except a law allowing for minting of money that was set aside by the first territorial governor). In 1857, the people of the territory passed a resolution to hold a convention to draft a constitution in order to achieve statehood. The Oregon Constitutional Convention was held in Salem during the summer of 1857, and created Oregon's first constitution. Oregon submitted the constitution to Congress, and on February 14, 1859, Oregon became a state.

== Economy ==
=== Fur trade ===
The Lewis and Clark Expedition helped expand interest in the Pacific Northwest. Although seaborne traders had been engaged in the fur trade along the coastline for many years, Lewis and Clark's news and descriptions of the region spurred others in the United States to seek fortunes in the fur trade business in Oregon Country. The first Americans to return were members of John Jacob Astor's Pacific Fur Company as part of an expedition that established Fort Astoria at the mouth of the Columbia River in 1811. However, some of the first British traders overland include members of the North West Company that crossed the Rocky Mountains in 1808 and traveled down what they named the Fraser River in modern British Columbia. The fur trade envisioned by the American Pacific Fur Company and put into practice by the North West Company, and later Hudson's Bay Company, was a triangular trade that sent furs to China, Chinese goods such as tea to England, and manufactured goods to the Pacific Northwest for trade with the Native Americans.

In 1813, during the War of 1812, the Pacific Fur Company representatives at Fort Astoria sold the fort and all other company assets in Oregon to the British-owned North West Company. This happened under threat from a British warship and without the confirmation of John Jacob Astor. Fort Astoria was renamed Fort George. When Astor tried to regain the post, the British insisted their takeover was a business deal, not an act of war. Astor lost his investment. Some years after the war, U.S. diplomats interpreted the Treaty of Ghent, which ended the war, as including the return of the fur trade post. Although returned to American ownership, the site of Fort Astoria was not reoccupied for many years. The North West Company built a new Fort George adjacent to the old one. In 1821 the North West Company and the Hudson's Bay Company were merged by an act of Parliament with the name of the Hudson's Bay Company (HBC) retained for the combined entity. The HBC then named Dr. John McLoughlin as Chief Factor for the region the HBC called the Columbia District which encompassed much of the drainage of the Columbia River.

In 1822, McLoughlin had a new post built near where the confluence of the Willamette River and the Columbia. On the north shore of the Columbia a new headquarters, Fort Vancouver, became the centerpiece of a multi-post system where furs and supplies were funneled in and out of Fort Vancouver. Brigades of fur trappers would spend months in the wilderness trapping animals, then return with the pelts to fur posts such as Fort George, Fort Umpqua, Fort Walla Walla, Fort Nisqually, Fort Okanogan, and Fort Boise. Later the HBC would start the Puget Sound Agricultural Company to supply food staples to the venture. By the 1830s the Hudson's Bay Company was worried about American expansion into the region and, in an attempt to forestall it, made a policy that fur trapping brigades operating south of the Columbia River, especially in the drainages of the Snake River and Willamette River, would work to create so-called "fur deserts", where beaver stocks were rapidly and deliberately depleted. This policy, although successful in making beaver rare in the Willamette Valley, did not prevent American settlement.

The next player in the fur trade was American Nathaniel Jarvis Wyeth who had made a fortune in the ice business in New England. In 1832 he led a new expedition to establish a fur trading empire through his new Pacific Trading Company. After returning from Oregon Country, Wyeth set out again in 1834 to set up the trading posts. His expedition established Fort Hall (on the Snake River) and Fort William (on Wapatoo Island), but the venture was a failure due to the dominance of the HBC in the region and the American Fur Company's control of the trade in the Rocky Mountains. In 1836 Wyeth sold his two posts to the HBC.

Beginning in the early 1840s the fur trade began to decline as fashion tastes shifted away from beaver pelt hats and the numbers of beavers declined due to over harvesting. Then beginning in the mid-1830s missionaries and settlers began to arrive in the region Also the majority of the Native Americans in many areas were killed off by diseases introduced by Euro-Americans, including up to 70 percent in the Willamette Valley and Lower Columbia valley by 1830. Mass migration began in 1842 when a wagon train of around 100 wagons came overland along the Oregon Trail. In 1846 McLoughlin retired from leading the HBC in the region. Then in 1849 the United States Army arrived after the creation of the Oregon Territory and set up adjacent to Fort Vancouver. In June 1860 the Hudson's Bay Company closed the fort and withdrew to Fort Victoria, essentially ending the systematic fur trade in the region.

=== Transportation ===
Early travel to the region was mainly by ship, with overland transportation developing later. By the 1830s a steady stream of travelers entered Oregon from the south through California and from the east over the Rocky Mountains. Many of these people were involved with the fur trade and would use the well worn trails of the Native Americans. Travel overland was mainly by horse, mule, and foot until the later 1830s when wagons slowly worked their way into the region. The Oregon Trail began seeing mass migration involving wagon trains in 1843. Boats were used extensively to haul cargo in the region, including steamboats, with the SS Beaver as the first steamboat in Oregon.

As more settlers arrived in the area, further transportation infrastructure was developed. Roads such as the Barlow Road, Canyon Road, and the Applegate Trail were created and small bridges built. Ferries also began to appear in the 1840s at many river crossings in the region. As the population grew, steamboats began regular service on the rivers, and later railroads were developed. The Oregon Steam Navigation Company and other smaller carriers developed transportation networks. The first railroad came in 1858 with the Cascade Railroad Company operating a line in the Columbia River Gorge, followed by the Oregon and California Railroad and eventually connections to the transcontinental rail lines in 1883.

In 1873, at Willamette Falls a lock and canal were completed to allow vessels to pass the waterfall and continue upriver on the Willamette River. Construction on a lock to bypass a set of cascades on the Columbia River began in 1878, but were not completed until 1896. Other canals were also built, including the Tualatin Canal at Oswego Lake. In 1887, the Morrison Bridge was completed as the first bridge over the Willamette River in Portland.

=== Other activities ===
In January 1837, thirteen pioneer settlers formed the Willamette Cattle Company to travel to Mexican-owned California and purchase cattle. The settlers were urged on by United States Navy officer William A. Slacum, who was on a mission from the United States President. Slacum provided some financing and the transportation to California aboard the vessel Loriot. The settlers were led by American Ewing Young, with others such as Jason Lee of the Methodist Mission and John McLoughlin of the Hudson's Bay Company providing additional investment.

Young led a small group to California, sailing from the Willamette River to San Francisco Bay. There the group procured about 630 head of cattle, which they drove north to the Willamette Valley. In Oregon, the cattle were divided between the investors, making Young one of the richest settlers in Oregon and helping to break the dependence of the settlers on the cattle of the HBC.

Although the Willamette Cattle Company brought some cattle to Oregon Country, the demand exceeded the supply. Beginning in 1840, another group of pioneers began building a ship to sail south to California where they would trade the ship for more livestock. This operation ended in 1843 when the group returned to the Willamette Valley settlements with a variety of livestock. They left California with 1,250 head of cattle, 600 horses and mules, and 3,000 sheep.

== See also ==
- History of the Northwestern United States
- History of the Pacific Northwest
- American Old West
