= Webley John Hauxhurst =

Oregon Country pioneer (1809–1874)

- Born: January 23, 1809; Brooklyn, New York, US
- Died: January 23, 1874 (aged 65); Bay City, Oregon, US
- Burial place: Trout Cemetery, Tillamook County, Oregon
- Occupations: sailor, soldier, pioneer
- Spouse: Wattiet "Miss Mary"

Webley John Hauxhurst Jr. (January 23, 1809 – January 23, 1874) was a pioneer in Oregon Country. He helped build the first grist mill in Oregon, participated in the Willamette Cattle Company, and was a participant at the Champoeg meeting where he voted for the creation of a provisional government.

== Early life ==
Hauxhurst was born in Brooklyn, New York, on January 23, 1809, to Quaker parents. As a young man he became a sailor, and later deserted his ship while in California. He spent three years there in Monterey, California working as a carpenter before leaving.

== Oregon ==
Webley John Hauxhurst traveled to Oregon Country in 1834. He came with Ewing Young and Hall J. Kelley from California, arriving at Fort Vancouver on the Columbia River on October 17. The next year, 1835, he helped to build the first grist mill in the Willamette Valley to mill grain. This mill he would later sell to Thomas McKay, the stepson of Doctor John McLoughlin, the Hudson's Bay Company Chief Factor at Fort Vancouver. Hauxhurst was also an investor in the Willamette Cattle Company in 1837 that brought over 600 head of cattle to Oregon from California. Originally, he was also going to accompany the group and help drive the cattle to Oregon, but changed his mind after the ship Loriot was delayed in sailing.

On Saturday, February 28, 1837, Webley Hauxhurst was married. The Reverend Jason Lee of the Methodist Mission then located at Mission Bottom married Miss Mary to Webley at the Mission house. Mary was a Native American from the Yamhill tribe. "He married the daughter of Chief Staywich or Staymire, of the Yamhill Indians." Hauxhurst would then become the mission's first white convert.

In 1843 in the aftermath of Ewing Young's death in 1841, the settlers of the region began discussions about forming a government as a continuation of the Champoeg Meetings. Then in May of that year, there was large meeting at Champoeg on the 2nd where a vote was taken on whether or not to form a government. Hauxhurst participated in this meeting and voted for the creation of the Provisional Government of Oregon that would last until 1849. In March 1844 he enlisted with the Oregon Rangers, a volunteer militia, as part of the Provisional Government's attempt to protect settlers from possible Native American attacks.

== Later life ==
In 1844, Joel Turnham threatened to hurt Hauxhurst and his wife, but was shot and killed by Deputy John E. Pickernell before any harm could be done to the Hauxhursts. Then in July 1846 the couple was divorced. They had 21 children together. After selling the grist mill, he moved to the Mill Creek area of what is now Salem, Oregon. While there he helped haul the first circus to Oregon and from 1862 to 1866 moved freight on the Willamette River between Portland and Salem. In Salem he would serve on the board of trustees for Willamette University before moving to Tillamook County on the Oregon Coast. In Tillamook he took up a squatter's land claim on land at the Bayocean Peninsula and worked as a captain of the vessel Champion, transporting goods between Tillamook and Portland. Webley John Hauxhurst died in 1874, he died on his birthday, January 23.

== See also ==
- Oregon Institute
