= George K. Gay =

American fur trader (1810–1882)

- Born: George Kirby Gay; August 15, 1810; Gloucestershire, England
- Died: October 7, 1882 (aged 72); Hopewell, Oregon, United States
- Occupations: Sailor, farmer
- Spouses: Louisa Hare; Mary Manson; Mary Ann Rubidow

George Kirby Gay (August 15, 1810 – October 7, 1882) was an English sailor and later settler in the Oregon Country. He was a member of the Willamette Cattle Company that brought livestock to Oregon and built the first brick house in the United States west of the Rocky Mountains. Gay also participated in the Champoeg Meetings that created a provisional government in what would become the U.S. state of Oregon.

== Early years ==
George Gay was born in Gloucestershire, England, on August 15, 1810. He became an apprentice sailor at the age of eleven and traveled much of the world and came to the United States. As a sailor, his last trip was aboard the whaleship Kitty, which he left at Monterey, California, in 1833 where he joined up with fur trapper Ewing Young. Gay went with Young to trap fur bearing animals to the north.

== Oregon ==
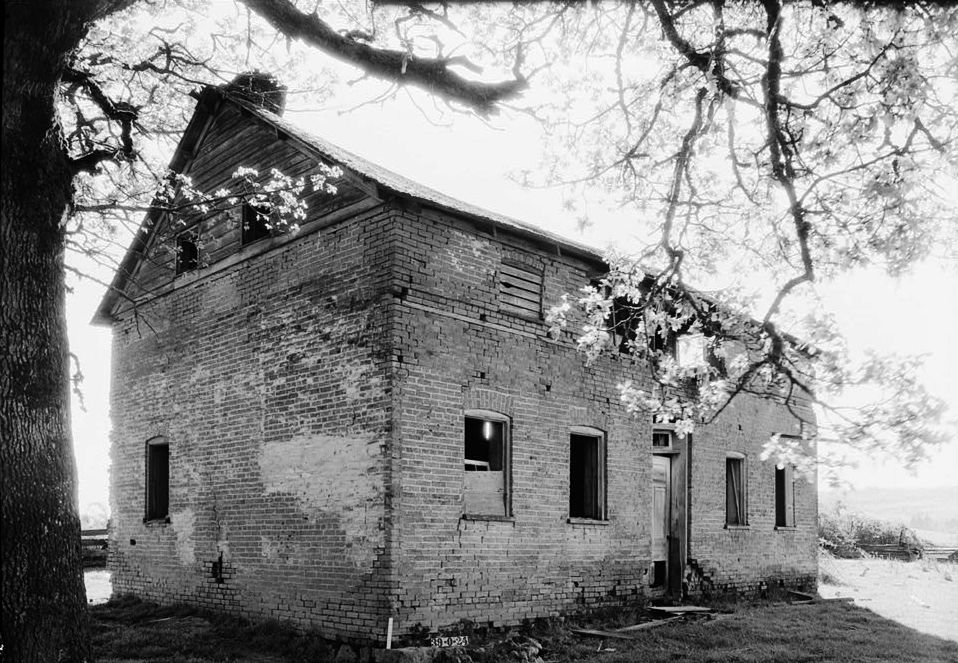
Gay's house in 1934

In 1835, George Gay returned to the Oregon Country with a party led by John Turner and included William J. Bailey. Two years later he joined Young again and invested in the Willamette Cattle Company. Gay and the others, led by Young, traveled to California by boat to purchase cattle and then overland back to the Willamette Valley. This party included William J. Bailey and Philip Leget Edwards, a teacher whose diary of the expedition was later published.

In his diary, Edwards wrote that Gay and Bailey both shot at a friendly Indigenous man, who was killed by one or both of their shots. Edwards recorded the shooting in mid-September of 1837, soon after the party crossed the Shasta River on their way back to Oregon. He wrote that the murdered man was accompanied by an Indigenous boy of about ten years old, who fled after the man was shot. Edwards stated that members of the group called "Shoot the boy! Shoot the boy!" but that the child escaped. Edwards wrote that he, Young, and one other man spoke against the murder, while the rest of the party either stayed silent or defended the murder as revenge for previous attacks on settlers by Indigenous people. Edwards continued:

Turner, Gay and Bailey were three of four survivors of a party of eight men who had been defeated at the next river, and several of the survivors were much mangled. Turner's wife had also escaped. This they allege as their justification. But the murder was committed four days before reaching the place of their defeat, and the Indians may have been of another tribe.

Edwards stated that two members of the party stripped the murdered man of his clothes and left his body lying naked.

The group finished the journey in October 1837 with around 630 head of cattle. Gay became wealthy due to his investment in the enterprise.

In 1838, Gay married Louisa Hare, whose name is also given as LaLouis St. Clair or Louise Sinclair in various records. They had nine children: Mary Ann, Joseph Witcum, John Kirby, Alfred, Paul George, William Edouard, Adaline Bellay, Louisa and Henri St. Clair.

Gay then claimed some land along the Willamette River near Wheatland, Oregon, and started farming. In 1841, he began building a home at the site, and when completed in 1842 it was the first brick house in the region. The bricks were fired on the property and used to build the walls and two fireplaces on the 14-foot (4.3 m) high structure. Gay’s home was 22 feet (6.7 m) wide by 32 feet (9.8 m) long. In 1843, he was selected to serve on a committee at the First Wolf Meeting, part of the series of Champoeg Meetings held to discuss forming a government in the Oregon Country.

On May 2, 1843, Gay voted with the prevailing party at the last of the Champoeg Meetings. The 52-50 vote established the Provisional Government of Oregon that would last until the Oregon Territory's government superseded it in 1849. Gay’s home would serve as one of the markers of the boundaries within the government. The south wall of his house marked the boundary line between the Yamhill and Champooick districts, and though the house is no longer standing, the location of that wall currently marks the line between Yamhill and Polk counties. In 1848, he went south to the California Gold Rush and mined for a time before returning to Oregon.

US Naval Officer Charles Wilkes, who met Gay in 1841, called Gay "a useful member of society in this small community: he gelds and marks cattle, breaks horses in, and tames cows for milking, assists in finding and driving cattle,–in short, he undertakes all and every sort of singular business." Wilkes noted that Gay had "a pretty and useful Indian wife", presumably Louisa Hare Gay, "who does his bidding, takes care of his children and horses, and guards his household and property." He also wrote that Gay "told me he bore the Indians no love, and is indeed a terror to them, having not unfrequently applied Lynch law to some of them with much effect."

== Later years ==
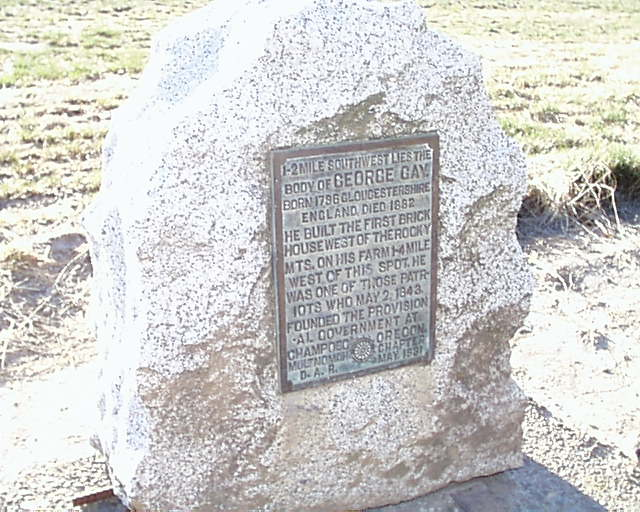
Historical marker

After the death of his wife Louisa in 1861, Gay remarried three more times to Mary Manson, Mary Condon and Mary Ann Rubidow.

Gay married Mary Manson in 1864. She was the daughter of Scottish-Canadian fur trader Donald Manson and the granddaughter of French-Canadian settler Étienne Lucier.

Gay married Mary Ann Rubidow in 1867. Rubidow was born Marie Anne Toupin in 1826 and was the daughter of Marie Aioe Dorion.

George Kirby Gay lost his fortune and died poor on October 7, 1882, at the age of 72 and was buried on his property near Wheatland, Oregon. A granite and bronze marker placed by the Daughters of the American Revolution on the Yamhill-Polk County line on Oregon Route 221 commemorates the location of Gay's home and gravesite and his involvement in the Champoeg Meetings.
