= Fort Hall =

Fortification

Coordinates: 43.0201°N 112.6347°W

- Fur Trade Outpost
- Constructed: 1834; 192 years ago
- Company built: Nathaniel Jarvis Wyeth
- Location: Fort Hall, Idaho, U.S.
- Continent: North America
- Later Ownership: 1837: Hudson's Bay Company; 1846: United States Army
- Abandoned: By 1863
- Fort Hall
- U.S. National Register of Historic Places
- U.S. National Historic Landmark
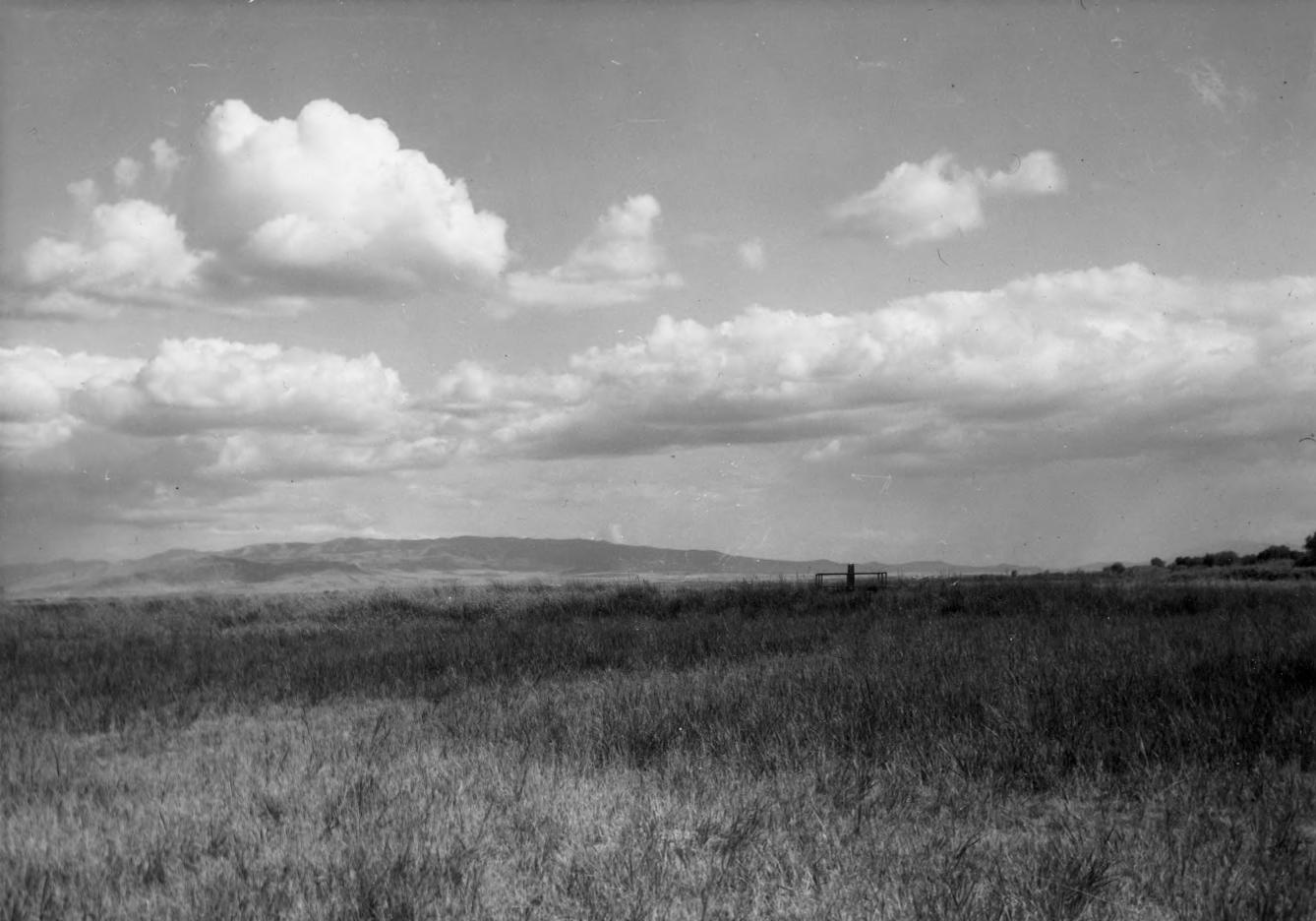
- Marker at the first Fort Hall site, 1958

- Location within the United States Location within Idaho
- Location: 11 mi. W of Fort Hall, Fort Hall Indian Reservation
- Built: 1834; 192 years ago
- NRHP reference No.: 66000306

Significant dates
- Added to NRHP: October 15, 1964
- Designated NHL: January 20, 1961
- Fort Hall Site; Fort Hall (United States Army, 1873-1883)
- U.S. National Register of Historic Places
- Location within Idaho Location within the United States
- Nearest city: Blackfoot, Idaho
- Area: 160 acres (65 ha)
- Built: 1870; 156 years ago
- NRHP reference No.: 74000732
- Added to NRHP: November 21, 1974

Fort Hall was a fort in the Western United States that was built in 1834 as a fur trading post by Nathaniel Jarvis Wyeth. It was located on the Snake River in the eastern Oregon Country, now part of present-day Bannock County in southeastern Idaho. Wyeth was an inventor and businessman from Boston, Massachusetts, who also founded a post at Fort William, in present-day Portland, Oregon, as part of a plan for a new trading and fisheries company. In 1837, unable to compete with the powerful British Hudson's Bay Company, based at Fort Vancouver, Wyeth sold both posts to it. Great Britain and the United States both operated in Oregon Country in these years.

After being included in United States territory in 1846 upon settlement of the northern boundary with Canada, Fort Hall developed as an important station for emigrants through the 1850s on the Oregon Trail; it was located at the end of the common 500-mile (800 km) stretch from the East shared by the three far west emigrant trails. Soon after Fort Hall, the Oregon and California Trails diverged in northwesterly and southwesterly directions. An estimated 270,000 emigrants reached Fort Hall on their way west. The town of Fort Hall later developed eleven miles (18 km) to the east, and Pocatello developed about thirty miles (50 km) south on the Portneuf River.

In the 1860s, Fort Hall was the key post for the overland stage, mail and freight lines to the towns and camps of the mining frontier in the Pacific Northwest. In 1870, a New Fort Hall was constructed to carry out that function; it was located about 25 miles to the northeast. It protected stagecoach, mail and travelers to the Northwest.

Fort Hall was considered the most important trading post in the Snake River Valley. It was included within the Fort Hall Indian Reservation under the treaty of 1867. No building remains at either of its sites. The Old Fort Hall site was designated a National Historic Landmark in 1961, and the New Fort Hall site is listed on the National Register of Historic Places.

== History ==
This area was long inhabited by varying cultures of indigenous peoples. By the time of European encounter, the historic Shoshone and Bannock peoples had been occupying the area for centuries. It was called Botoode in Shoshoni. They were among the Plains peoples who had adopted horses to use as part of their nomadic and seasonal movement associated with hunting game, particularly bison. French trappers and British traders from Canada had traded with them long before American explorers arrived.

=== Oregon Country ===
In the late 1820s, Hall J. Kelley of Boston was among men who became interested in commercial possibilities in the Oregon Country, described by a later historian as offering a "field of exploitation for adventurous capital". He recruited Nathaniel Jarvis Wyeth, an inventor and businessman who had made the ice industry successful in Boston, to his plan to invest in an expedition to the Northwest where they would make their fortunes. They planned a joint expedition in 1831, with intentions to establish a company for fur trading and developing a salmon fishery to rival New England's cod fishery. Organizing the expedition suffered delays and it never took place.

In 1832 Wyeth decided to proceed on his own with an independent expedition. With a company of 70-100 men, he intended to establish a fishery and trading post on the Columbia River near its confluence with the Willamette River (part of present-day Portland, Oregon). Related plans were to supply trade goods to trappers in the Rocky Mountains and possibly slaughter and dry bison for export to Cuba. A major investor in the fishery/trading post enterprise was Henry Hall, a partner of the Boston firm Tucker & Williams & Henry Hall. In addition to fur trading, they planned to export salmon to New England and Hawaii.

In 1832, Benjamin Louis Eulalie de Bonneville and his party had first taken wagons over the South Pass of the Rocky Mountains. This route had been rediscovered by trappers in 1824. It led back to the North Platte River valley, which was being developed as a key route in connecting the East by a wagon road to the Oregon Country. The Platte Rivers were chief transportation corridors, and the river valleys provided level land for wagons. This was the route for 500 miles (800 km) from the Missouri River fur ports at Independence and St. Joseph, Missouri. Other emigrants went overland starting from St. Louis, Missouri, where the fur companies and emigrant suppliers were based.

The Native Americans had used South Pass, as well as a more northerly trail which they had guided the Lewis and Clark Expedition to follow during their 1804–1806 journey into Oregon and to the Pacific Coast. It had frequent obstacles, turns and switchbacks, making it difficult for wagon trains, mules and oxen, the common beasts of burden for the emigrants.

The 1834 trappers' rendezvous was held at a meadow around Hams Fork, (near present-day Granger, Wyoming); the annual events were occasions for sales between mountain men, who were independent trappers and traders, and agents of the fur companies, who bought the furs and supplied the traders with goods. The rendezvous were organized by the fur companies and were several-day affairs that were business, but festive in nature and oiled by alcohol.

=== Old Fort Hall (1834–1856) ===
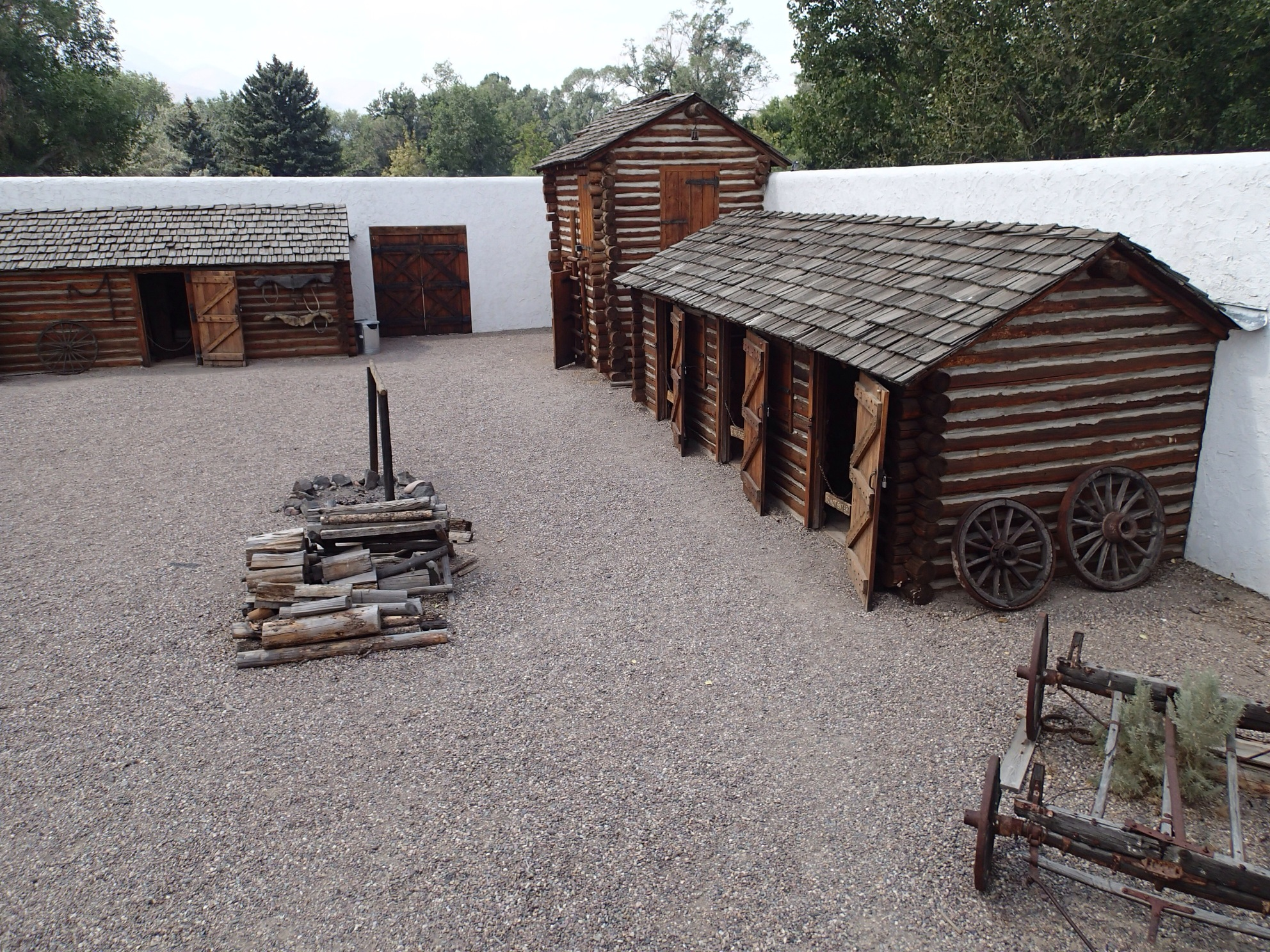
Courtyard of 1960s replica at Pocatello

In July 1834, Wyeth found that, despite his contract with Milton Sublette of the Rocky Mountain Fur Company, its agents at the rendezvous refused to accept his goods. They paid only to cover the advance and the forfeit, claiming that they were dissolving the business. Wyeth notified Tucker & Williams of the problems. As he was left with stocks of goods, he advised them of his intention to go west about 150 miles (240 km) to the Snake River country (present-day southeastern Idaho) and try to do business there. He was sending word in advance to Indian tribes to bring in buffalo robes for trading.

Wyeth and his party traveled west some 150 miles (240 km) to the Snake near the mouth of the Portneuf. They constructed the wooden storehouses at Fort Hall. Wyeth named the fort after a major expedition investor, Henry Hall. They finished a palisade around the fort on July 31, 1834; it was the only outpost of European Americans in that area of the Oregon Country.

Because of the Oregon boundary dispute between the United States and Great Britain, the region was open to settlement and economic activity, but not any formal claims. In practice, the Hudson's Bay Company maintained an effective monopoly on trade in the region. The British company controlled the Columbia River's watershed. It shut out the independent trapper-trader mountain men and cut severely into the profit margins of the larger American overland fur trading companies—mostly organized in St. Louis. Between the Hudson's Bay Company and John Jacob Astor's near-monopoly of American fur traders with the American Fur Company, new companies regularly failed in their first half decade. Most mountain men had started to work under contract to the big companies.

When Fort Hall was completed, Wyeth continued toward the Columbia River with members of his expedition. They encountered the Methodist missionary Jason Lee on his way to start the Methodist Mission in the Willamette Valley. Once Wyeth reached the lower Columbia, he built Fort William to serve as the 'envisioned' "regular rendezvous point" on the Columbia.

The HBC had been trapping in the Snake country for years. Using its trading post at Fort Boise, it drove Wyeth's company out of business, and he sold Fort Hall to the HBC. The peak of the fur market had already passed, as furs were becoming scarce due to over trapping and European demand had declined due to changes in taste.

Having struggled to keep workers and failed to make enough money, in August 1837, Wyeth sold both his forts to the Hudson's Bay Company (HBC). It controlled most of the fur trade in the Oregon Country (which they called the Columbia District or the Columbia Department) from their headquarters at Fort Vancouver on the Columbia River. As the British did not want American pioneers in Oregon, the HBC managers newly installed at Fort Hall discouraged pioneers. They showed new emigrants the abandoned wagons of earlier emigrants who lost their oxen. They were forced to proceed on foot with any remaining domestic animals.

=== Oregon migration ===
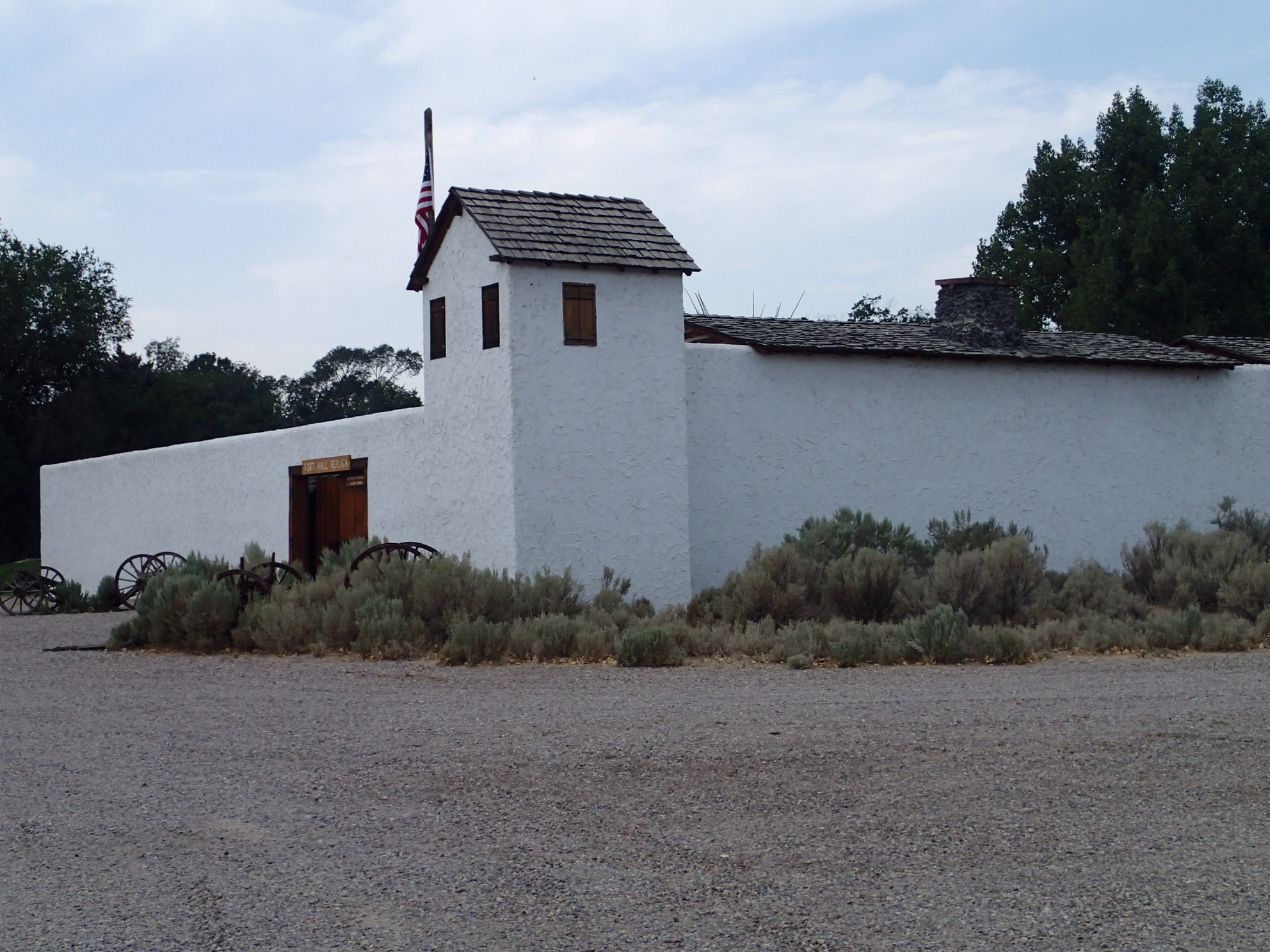
Replica of the first Fort Hall in Pocatello

In 1843, Marcus Whitman, a missionary who had established a mission near present-day Walla Walla, Washington, led a wagon train westward from Fort Hall, despite discouragement from the British. His reports, when received back east amidst the country-wide expansionist mindset of true believers in manifest destiny, started a growing flood of settlers increasing in numbers year by year.

The settlers were reinforced by the Presidential politics with Democrats demanding a settlement of the "Oregon Question" and proposing a border far to the north of today's boundary between the United States and Canada. The election year's slogans and bad press, Democratic hawks' control of the U.S. legislatures, the steep decrease in fur market demand, and finally the declaration of war by Mexico over the annexation of their rebel state of Texas all had an accelerating effect greasing the diplomatic wrangling and finally putting an Administration-sponsored treaty before the Senate which set the current boundary, where it was quickly adopted under the wartime congressional session. No one saw any reason to embarrass their own parties or President, and fighting two wars in widely different geographic theaters was nonsensical. The treaty triggered an explosion of settlers heading west in 1846, and the Mormon Exodus had already begun in Illinois and Missouri. U.S. Army forces were assigned to send patrols and safeguard the road.

In the following years, the number of emigrant wagon trains increased dramatically as the migration of people increased to the West. Fort Hall became a welcome stop along the trail for hundreds of thousands of emigrants. It continued as an important trading post for mountain men and the Native Americans of the region, in particular the Shoshone.

In 1846, the Oregon Treaty settled boundaries in the Northwest between Great Britain (Canada) and the United States; Fort Hall was included within the US and its territories. From 1849 to 1850, Cantonment Loring, a US military camp, was located three miles (5 km) downriver from Fort Hall. Its garrison was assigned to protect the Oregon Trail, but the camp was abandoned due to long-distance supply difficulties. Instead the Army dispatched expeditions from Oregon to guard the trail to Fort Hall during each summer after 1855, as the migrations continued.

=== Civil War and after ===
With the outbreak of the Civil War in 1861, emigrant traffic declined and the Army abandoned Fort Hall. It was briefly occupied by the Volunteer soldiers of the Union Army. Flood waters of the Snake River washed away the Old Fort Hall in 1863. Fort Hall was rebuilt in 1864, on Spring Creek just north of the original Fort Hall. The old fort was taken apart to construct the new fortified stage station. The following year, the site was abandoned. The Volunteer troops moved to Camp Lander until 1866. It was located three miles (5 km) southeast of the original Fort Hall, at the junction of the Salt Lake and Boise roads.

In 1867, the United States established the Fort Hall Indian Reservation for displaced Boise and Bruneau Shoshone, with local Shoshone and Bannock included under an 1868 treaty. They had suffered years of encroachment on their territory by European American settlers. The town of Fort Hall developed about 11 miles (18 km) east of the old trading post and fort; both are within the reservation. In 1961, the site of the original Fort Hall, which is marked by a memorial, was declared a National Historic Landmark.

A replica of the original Fort Hall was constructed in the 1960s in Pocatello, about thirty miles (50 km) away, and is operated as a public museum.

== New Fort Hall ==
On May 27, 1870, the US Army built another military Fort Hall on Lincoln Creek, twelve miles (20 km) east of the Snake River and about 25 miles (40 km) northeast of the old Fort Hall. Captain James Edward Putnam and a company of soldiers built the new facility. Army soldiers were garrisoned to protect stagecoach travelers, the US mail, and workers going to mining areas in the Northwest. The Army abandoned the fort on June 11, 1883.

The federal government transferred the land and barracks to the Bureau of Indian Affairs (BIA), which adapted the buildings as an Indian boarding school. This was part of a late-nineteenth century movement to establish residential schools for immersion education of Native American children to learn the English language and European-American culture. The buildings were eventually relocated to Ross Fork Creek within the reservation.

None of the original buildings remains at either site; the 1870 site is also listed on the National Register of Historic Places.

== See also ==
- List of National Historic Landmarks in Idaho
- National Register of Historic Places in Bannock County, Idaho
