= Kelley Point Park =

Public park in Portland, Oregon, U.S.

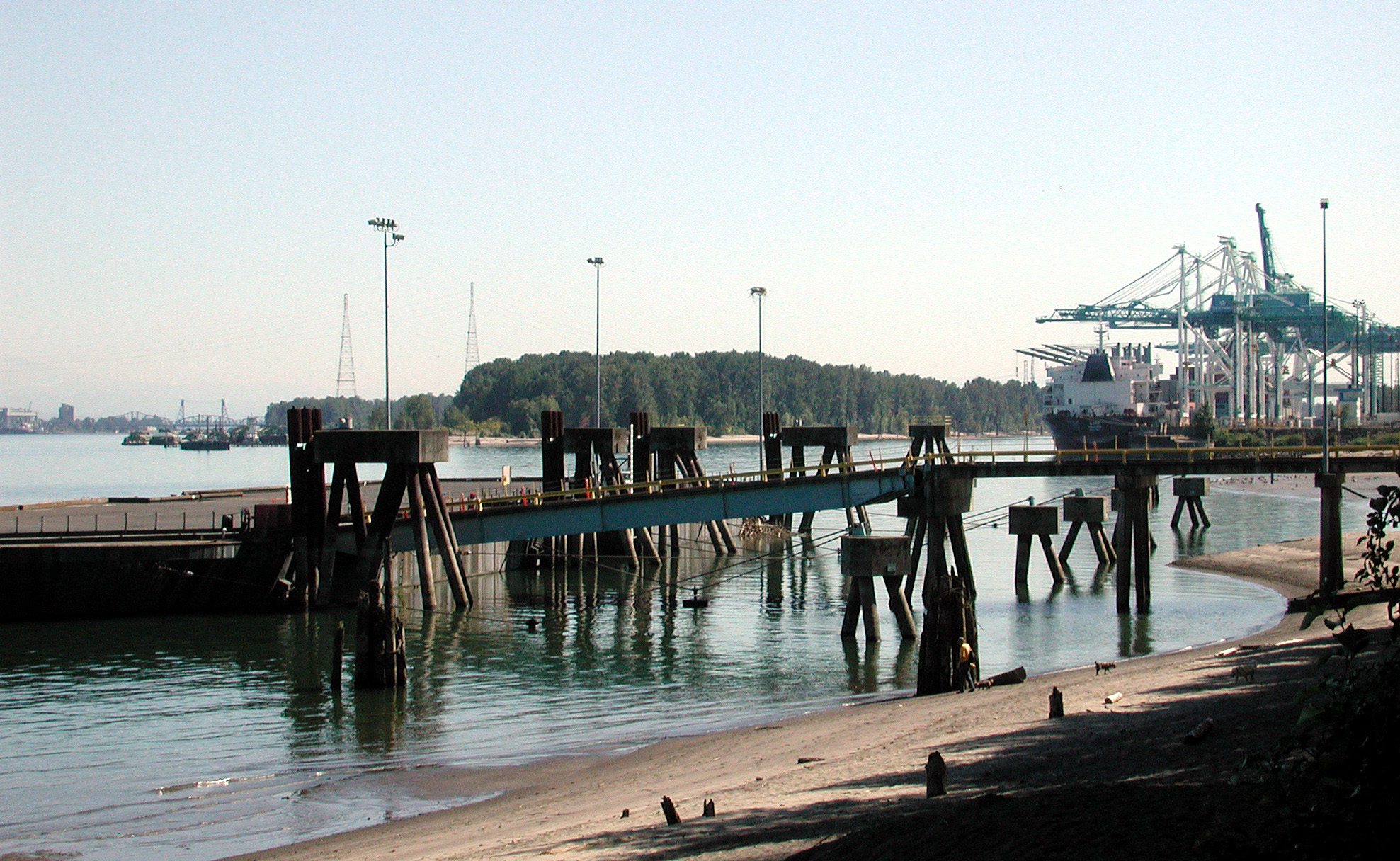
- View up the Columbia River from the park, 2008
- Interactive map of Kelley Point Park
- Type: Urban park
- Location: N Marine Dr. and Lombard St. Portland, Oregon
- Coordinates: 45.649838°N 122.763711°W
- Area: 104.69 acres (42.37 ha)
- Created: 1984
- Operator: Portland Parks & Recreation
- Status: Open 6 a.m. to 9 p.m. daily

Kelley Point Park is a city park in north Portland in the U.S. state of Oregon. Bounded by the Columbia Slough on the south, the Willamette River on the west, and the Columbia River on the north, the park forms the tip of the peninsula at the confluence of the rivers. Marine Terminal 6 of the Port of Portland lies immediately east of the park along the Columbia, while Terminal 5 is along the Willamette slightly south of the Columbia Slough. The park is at 45.6498384°N 122.7637106°W and rises to an elevation of 39 feet (12 m) above sea level. Sauvie Island is west of the park across the Willamette River. Hayden Island is slightly upstream of the park on the Columbia River opposite Marine Terminal 6.

== Description and history ==
The city acquired the park site in 1984 from the Port of Portland, which had covered much of the peninsula with dredged material from the Columbia River to create places to build terminals. The site was formerly part of Pearcy Island, separated from the mainland by sloughs, one of which was called Pearcy Slough. Pearcy Island still appears on topographical maps at 45.6426163°N 122.7595437°W even though it is no longer an island. Pearcy Island and Pearcy Slough were named after Nathan Pearcy, who settled a donation land claim on the island in 1850. Development projects later altered the landforms in this vicinity. For example, maps from as late as December 1919 show that what is now Kelley Point was originally a small, separate landmass known as Nigger Tom Island. According to an article published in the December 1864 issue of The Atlantic magazine, the island was named for a "blind African nobleman" who once lived there and was known locally by this moniker. He was described as "living in great affluence of salmon and whiskey with three or four devoted Indian wives, who had with equal fervor embraced the doctrine of Mormonism and the profession of day’s-washing to keep their liege in luxury due his rank." The name Nigger Tom Island stopped appearing on maps after the narrow slough that separated it from Pearcy Island was filled-in sometime after 1919, making it the northern tip of the larger island.

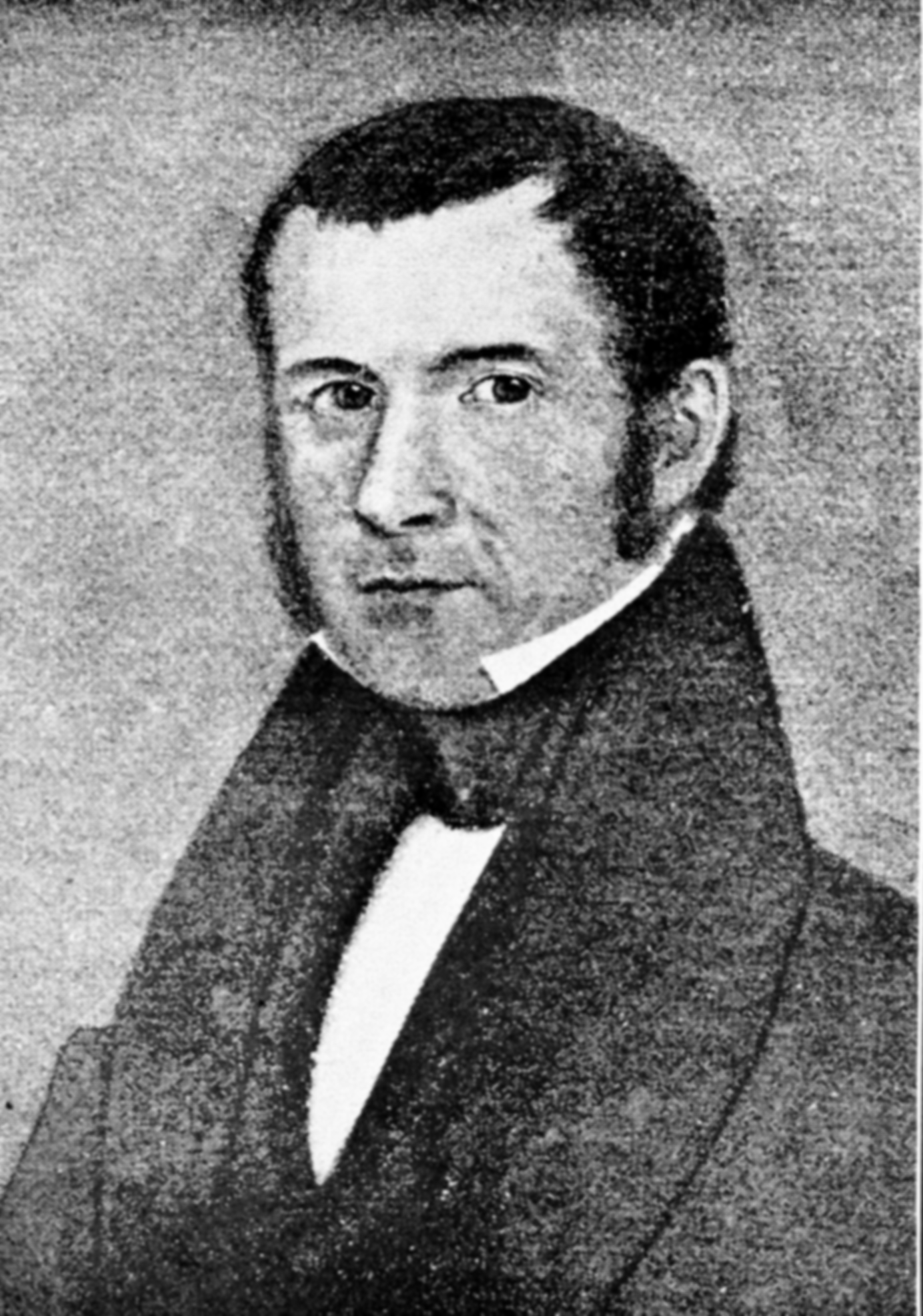
Hall Jackson Kelley, for whom the park is named

In 1926, a group of Portland citizens persuaded the United States Board on Geographic Names to name it Kelley Point. The name honors Hall Jackson Kelley (1790–1874), a New England resident who during the first half of the 19th century promoted interest in Oregon and the Pacific Northwest. During a brief visit to Oregon in 1834, Kelley tried unsuccessfully to establish a city at the confluence.

Park amenities include a historical site, paved and unpaved paths, picnic tables, public art, restrooms, and a vista point. The 104.16-acre (42.15 ha) park, operated by the Portland Parks & Recreation Department, is open from 6 a.m. to 9 p.m. Kelley Point was once the site of a small lighthouse.

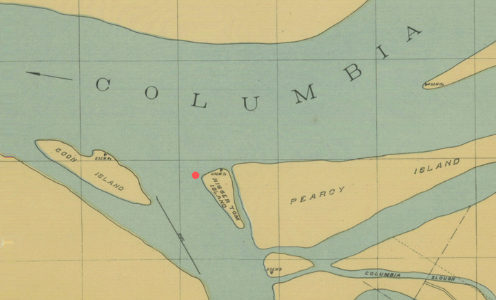
Dec. 1919 Commission of Public Docks map showing the mouth of the Willamette. The red dot off Nigger Tom Island (now Kelley Point) was the approximate location of the Willamette River Lighthouse

Wildlife includes Bewick's wrens that frequent the park's black cottonwood forest. Caspian terns, osprey, double-crested cormorants, and gulls are common near the rivers. Sights from the vista point include ship traffic on both rivers. An informal Columbia Slough canoe launch lies near the park entrance along Kelley Point Park Road, west of Interstate 5 along North Marine Drive. The 40-Mile Loop hiking and biking trail runs by the entrance to the park.

== Works cited ==
- Houck, Mike, and Cody, M.J., eds. (2000). Wild in the City. Portland, Oregon: Oregon Historical Society Press. ISBN 0-87595-273-9.
- McArthur, Lewis A.; McArthur, Lewis L. (2003). Oregon Geographic Names, Seventh Edition. Portland, Oregon: Oregon Historical Society Press. ISBN 0-87595-277-1
