= Oregon missionaries =

Group of people

The Oregon missionaries were pioneers who settled in the Oregon Country of North America starting in the 1830s dedicated to bringing Christianity to local Native Americans. There had been missionary efforts prior to this, such as those sponsored by the North West Company with missionaries from the Church of England starting in 1819. The Foreign Mission movement was already 15 years underway by 1820, but it was difficult to find missionaries willing to go to Oregon, as many wanted to go to the east, to India or China. It was not until the 1830s, when a schoolmaster from Connecticut, Hall Jackson Kelley, created his "American Society for the Settlement of the Oregon Country," that more interest and support for Oregon missionaries grew. Around the same time, four Nez Perce arrived in St. Louis in the fall of 1831, with accounts differencing as to if these travelers were asking for "the book of life", an idea used by Protestant missionaries, or if they asked for "Blackrobes", meaning Jesuits, thus Catholic missionaries. Either way this inspired Christian missionaries to travel to the Oregon Territory. Oregon missionaries played a political role, as well as a religious one, as their missions established US political power in an area in which the Hudson's Bay Company, operating under the British government, maintained a political interest in the Oregon country. Such missionaries had an influential impact on the early settlement of the region, establishing institutions that became the foundation of United States settlement of the Pacific Northwest.

== Wyeth-Lee Party ==
In 1834, New York Methodist minister Jason Lee came to the Oregon Country as the first of these missionaries, to establish the first American settlement and to convert the native population. The party was called the Wyeth-Lee Party as Lee had contracted with Nathaniel Jarvis Wyeth, who was going on his second trading expedition, to accompany him. The party set out on April 28, 1834, traveling independently from the American Fur Company's caravan headed for the same destination. Lee built a mission school for Indians in the Willamette Valley at the site of present-day Salem, Oregon. The school evolved from a mission school to a secondary school called the Oregon Institute, eventually becoming Willamette University, the oldest university on the West Coast.

== Whitman-Spalding Party ==
In 1835, Dr. Marcus Whitman made his initial journey west from New York, past the Rocky Mountains and into California. 1836, Marcus Whitman made the same trip, this time with his new wife, Narcissa Whitman, and another missionary couple, Henry Harmon Spalding (who had been jilted by Narcissa) and his wife Eliza Spalding. Narcissa and Eliza were the first white women to cross the Rocky Mountains.

The Whitman's reached Fort Walla Walla on October 26, 1838, and founded a mission at Waiilatpu, about 25 miles east of Fort Wallo Wallo in the Walla Walla Valley, then the territory of the Cayuse Indians, in the present-day state of Washington. The Spalding's founded a mission among the Nez Perce Indians at Lapwai, at the foot of Thunder Mountain, in present-day Idaho. Henry Spalding is credited with the creation of the Protestant Ladder, used to teach natives history from Creation to ascent into Heaven. This style of teaching, using a long strip of paper or cloth, was based on the Catholic Ladder used by Catholic Missionaries in the region.

== Catholic Missionaries ==
Catholic missionaries in Oregon Territory followed two paths into the region, with missionaries, such as Father Francis Norbert Blanchet and Father Modeste Demers, coming from Quebec in 1837 and a later group of missionaries following a path similar to the Protestant missionaries coming from the Eastern America, such as Father Pierre-Jean De Smet in 1841.

Catholic missionary work in Oregon Territory officially began when Fr. Francis Norbert Blanchet was appointed Vicar-General of Oregon Country by Archbishop Joseph Signay of Quebec in April 1838. Fr. Blanchet and Fr. Modest Demers arrived in the region at Fort Vancouver on November 24 1838. Originally the missionaries used hymns and books which had been translated into the Chinook Jargon, a language used commonly among different native groups of the region for trade, in their conversion efforts. Realizing that the ideas and concepts within Catholicism were not coming across to their audiences, Fr. Blanchet began using carved shale sticks in his conversion efforts in April 1839, during a visit to the Cowlitz settlement. The shale stick, referred to as the Catholic Ladder, was carved with representations of Christian History. These shale sticks were then distributed to Native chiefs, starting in October 1839, to teach Catholicism. Soon after, the Catholic Ladder began to be produced in paper copies and later massed produced for distribution in the Pacific Northwest with Quebec church leaders arranging for the printing and shipping of 2,000 to the region. Later, Protestant missionaries began using their own version of the ladder, with Henry Spalding being credited with creating the Protestant Ladder using some images from the Catholic Ladder and adding his own. Both the Catholic and Protestant ladders would also represent the opposing domination as heathens.

In 1841, The Rocky Mountain Mission in the Pacific Northwest was started by Fr. Pierre-Jean De Smet and became the most sought-after mission post among Jesuits. The majority of Jesuit missionaries were Italian, owing to instability at home during the period, but missionaries from other nations came to region as well.

Blanchet was made Bishop in 1843, along with the region being made into an Apostolic Vicariate which reached from the Arctic in the North, the Rockies in the East, and the US-Mexican border in the South. Later, in 1846, the region was made into the Ecclesiastical Province of Oregon with Blanchet becoming the archbishop of the archiepiscopal see of Oregon City. This made Oregon the second Ecclesiastical Province created in the US.

Catholics in the region faced persecution by the majority Protestant white settlers, with Father Augustin Magliore Blanchet, Francis Blanchet's brother, being blamed for the Whitman Massacre in 1847, despite only arriving in Walla Walla three months prior to the events.

== Legacy of Early Oregon Missionaries ==
Missionary work in the Oregon country continued into the 1850s, though in 1853, the Washington territory was established, separate from the Oregon territory to which it had previously belonged. The success in converting Native Americans to Christianity was varied. In some cases, the Indians were very suspicious of the missionaries, and this suspicion only increased when many of the Indians contracted diseases that were introduced by missionaries and White settlers.

As tensions between native tribes and White missionaries rose during the 1850s, resulting in small-scale wars between settlers and natives, like the Rogue River War, missionary work in Oregon was increasingly targeted at White immigrants from the eastern parts of the US, rather than native populations.
