= John Turner (fur trapper) =

American fur trapper and guide

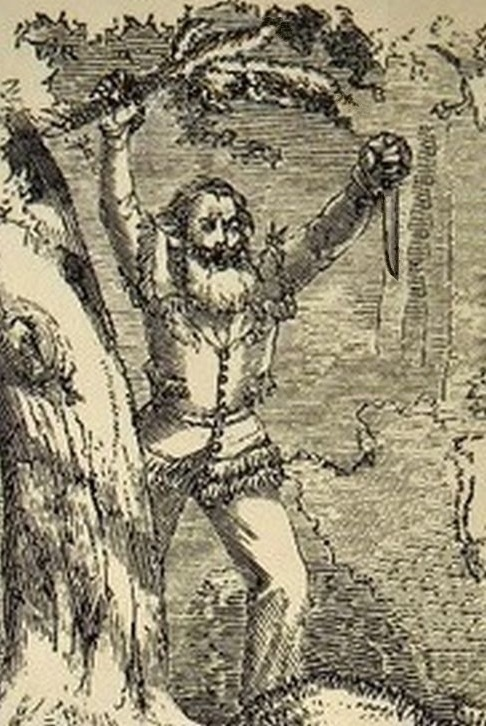
- John Turner defending his camp in 1835
- Born: 1807; Madison County, Kentucky
- Died: 1847, 39 or 40 years old California
- Cause of death: Ballistic trauma
- Occupations: Fur trapper Guide
- Years active: 1823 – 1847
- Known for: Umpqua massacre Willamette Cattle Company
- Parent(s): Smithton Turner and Nancy Ragsdale

John Turner (1807 – 1847) was an American fur trapper and guide who first entered Oregon Country in 1828 and became an early resident of the Willamette Valley. Later he moved to California where he was part of the second attempt to rescue the Donner Party.

== Early life ==
Turner was born in Madison County, Kentucky in the year 1807 to parents Smithton Turner and Nancy Ragsdale. By 1823 he was working in the fur trade in the Rocky Mountains. (Note: In 1823, Turner would have been 16-17. The only known source that puts him in the fur trade at that young of age and early a date is the 1876 Transactions of the ... Annual Reunion of the Oregon Pioneer Association.)

== Mojave and Umpqua Massacres ==
At the 1827 rendezvous on the southern shore of Bear Lake, Jedediah Smith assembled a party of 18 fur trappers and two Native American women to accompany him on a return trip to California. (Note: Smith and 15 other men had traveled there the year prior, and about ten of them had stayed behind waiting for Smith to return.) Turner joined the group, and they headed southwest, essentially retracing Smith's route the year before. While Smith's party crossed the Colorado River at the 35th parallel, a hostile group of Mohave attacked, killing ten trappers and capturing the two women. The surviving men, including Smith and Turner, eventually met up with the group that had previously traveled with Smith to California, and after many additional setbacks, a party of 18 continued north into the Oregon Country, being joined along the way by an Indian boy they called Marion.

In June 1828 the party began trading with the Lower Umpqua people, a Native American community known to early writers as the Kalawatset. On the morning of July 14, 1828, Smith, Turner, Richard Leland, and a Kalawatset were off in a canoe searching for an overland route north when their camp was attacked. The three avoided the attack and made their way north to Fort Vancouver When they arrived after 28 days, they found that another member of their party, Arthur Black, had survived the attack and had arrived two days earlier. It was later confirmed that 15 men died in the attack including Marion, the Indian boy. Turner was the only man besides Smith to have survived both massacres.

== Hudson's Bay Company and Tututni Massacre ==
The four survivors stayed at Fort Vancouver until the spring of 1829, when Smith and Black left to return to the Rocky Mountain region. Turner and LeLand stayed behind and Turner joined up with Hudson's Bay Company (HBC) to guide trapping forays into California. In 1832, while accompanying a 163-member party led by Michel Laframboise in California, he met Ewing Young, quit the HBC and enlisted with Young.

In June 1835 Turner was leading a small band of eight pioneers from California to Oregon. The group included William J. Bailey and George K. Gay. and a woman and two children thought to be Turner's Native American family. The pioneers were attacked at the Rogue River by a community of Native Americans known as the Tututni. Turner grabbed a large burning log during his escape, and fought off the attackers. (Note: In 1920, John Gneisenau Neihardt wrote that Turner was at camp during the Umpqua massacre and defended himself in the same manner. In 1922, Charles Henry Carey repeated Neihardt's version. In History of the Willamette Valley, Being a Description of the Valley and Its Resources, with an Account of Its Discovery and Settlement by White Men, and Its Subsequent History Together with Personal Reminiscences of Its Early Pioneers it was stated that it was "Richard Laughlin" (Richard Leland) who had fought his way out of the camp with the burning log and was one of the survivors There was obvious confusion over what massacre Turner defended himself with the burning log; it was first confused with the Umpqua massacre, and then Turner was confused with Leland. A discussion of the different versions of the Umpqua massacre can be found in Don Whereat's Our Culture and History) Only Turner, Woodsworth, Bailey, and Gay survived.

== Willamette Cattle Company ==
In 1837 Turner accompanied a group of eleven Oregon pioneers, including Gay and Bailey, known as the Willamette Cattle Company on a cattle drive to bring several hundred head of cattle from California to the Willamette Valley, under the direction of Ewing Young. The party sailed to California, purchased 729 head of cattle (Note: McLoughlin recalled about 700 cattle being purchased) and some horses, and began herding the cattle north. The journey was arduous, and the company resented Young. (Note: In a story Hubert Howe Bancroft viewed as unreliable, an anonymous article from the June 5, 1869, Nevada Gazette described a plot among the members of the company to kill Young and divide his stock. The article recounted that Turner was elected to shoot Young, but Turner chose not to carry out the plot.) Turner, Gay and Bailey were bent on revenge for the Tututni massacre, and Gay cold-bloodedly shot an Indian. After that, Indians plagued the party, shooting arrows into the stock. With attrition along the route, they delivered 630 cattle to the Willamette Valley settlement. (Note: Bancroft recorded 200 dead cattle.)

== Memorial of 1838 ==
In the 1830s, settlers in the Willamette Valley petitioned the United States Congress to take an active role in promoting American interests in the Oregon Country. The Hudson's Bay Company had established a form of government loyal to British interests, and although the Americans in the Willamette Valley were not subjects of British rule, many desired that the United States exert legal and military control over the land. The petition, known as the Memorial of 1838, (Note: The document was printed by the U.S. Senate January 28, 1839; see Brosnan, p. 74.) was prepared by Jason Lee and signed by 36 Willamette Valley settlers. Last among the signers was John Turner.

The Memorial of 1838 preceded the Champoeg Meetings by three years. Mack and Meaghers counted Turner among the creators of the Provisional Government of Oregon at Champoeg, although he is not listed among the voters.

== Move to California and the second rescue attempt of the Donner Party ==
After the Willamette Valley settlers created the Provisional Government, Turner sold his property to John Phillips for $100 and moved to California. (Note: The Nomination Form for the John Phillips House NRHP application states that Phillips bought a land claim "for $100 from a man named Turner." See Hartwig, Paul B.; Powers III, D.W. (March 15, 1976). "Phillips, John, House" (PDF). National Register of Historic Places Inventory – Nomination Form. National Park Service.) (Note: Although the Phillips House is in Polk County, in 1848 Polk County was created from part of the Yamhill District, and in 1845 John Turner was counted among the residents in the district. See "Case 12193: Turner, John". Oregon Historical Records Index. Oregon State Archives.)

In 1847 Turner participated in the second rescue attempt of the Donner Party.

== Epitaphs ==
In his remarks at the tenth annual reunion of the Oregon Pioneer Association in 1882, association president J. W. Nesmith stated, "The old Kentucky giant, John Turner, so well known and famed for his herculean strength, good nature, quaint oddities and dauntless courage, through the Rocky mountains, New Mexico, California and Oregon, from 1823 to 1847, was killed in the latter year in California by the accidental discharge of his own rifle."

Turner's Oregon Pioneer Registry card at the Oregon Historical Society states, "Born Kentucky. Came to Oregon 1828 from Missouri. Died 1847. Was with Jedediah S. Smith's Trapping of party of 18 in 1828; in July of that year all but two of his companions were killed by Indians near the mouth of the Umpqua River; he began trapping in 1823 and continued in Rocky Mountains, Oregon, New Mexico and California until 1847, when he accidentally shot himself.
