= Philip Leget Edwards =

American politician

Member of the Missouri House of Representatives
- In office 1842–1843
- Constituency: Ray County, Missouri

Member of the California State Assembly from the 9th District
- In office 1855–1856
- Constituency: Sacramento County, California

Personal details
- Born: July 14, 1812 Breckinridge County, Kentucky
- Died: May 1, 1869 (aged 56) California
- Party: Whig
- Spouse: Mary Venable Allen
- Profession: Educator, lawyer

Philip Leget Edwards (July 14, 1812 – May 1, 1869) was an American educator from the state of Kentucky and first teacher in what became the state of Oregon. After teaching in Missouri, he traveled to the Oregon Country with Jason Lee and helped establish the Methodist Mission. He was also involved with the Willamette Cattle Company before returning to Missouri where he became a lawyer and was on officer in the militia fighting against the Mormons. After moving to California, he served in the state assembly.

== Early life ==
Philip Edwards was born in Breckinridge County, Kentucky, on July 14, 1812. His parents were the former Jane Cunningham and John Edwards. The family moved to Missouri one year after his birth. After receiving his education he was a teacher in that state from 1833 to 1834.

== Oregon Country ==
In 1834, missionary Jason Lee was heading west to start a mission in the Oregon Country when he was passing through Missouri. Edwards was living in Richmond, Missouri, at the time and agreed to join Lee's group. He and Courtney M. Walker joined the rest of the group at Independence and headed west. These missionaries traveled with mountain men and traders including Nathaniel Wyeth's group across the Rocky Mountains, reaching the pass on June 15, 1834, and Fort Vancouver on September 16. That fall the group started building a mission along the Willamette River north of present-day Salem, Oregon. Edwards was engaged in farming much of his time at the mission.

From 1835 to 1836 Edwards taught school to both Native Americans and the children of French-Canadian settles of the French Prairie at a small school at Champoeg. As such, he was the first school teacher in what became the state of Oregon. He was part of the Willamette Cattle Company in 1837, traveling to California with Ewing Young and others to purchase cattle and drive them back to the Willamette Valley. Edwards served as the treasurer of the group and kept a journal of the trip. In 1838, he wrote a memorial to the United States Congress concerning the conditions in the Oregon Country, and then accompanied Jason Lee back east to deliver the document as Lee recruited more people for the mission.

== Political career ==
Edwards was elected to the Missouri House of Representatives in 1842 to represent Ray County as a Whig. In the legislature he served as the chairman of the judiciary committee. In 1844, he was a delegate to the Whig Presidential Convention in Baltimore, Maryland, serving as the chairman of the state's delegation.

In California, he was the Whig Party's candidate for Congress in the 1852 election, losing to Milton Latham. He served as a Whig legislator in the California State Assembly after winning election to the lower chamber in September 1854. He represented the 9th district and Sacramento County and served as the chair of the judiciary committee.

== Later years ==
Edwards then returned to Missouri where he became an attorney, passing the bar in 1840. Later in 1840, he married there to Mary Venable Allen, who bore him two daughters. Edwards joined the Missouri militia in 1841 to fight against the Mormons, and attained the rank of Colonel. In 1842, he published the Sketch of the Oregon Territory, Or, Emigrants' Guide. Edwards moved west again in 1850, settling in Nevada County, California, in September. Philip Leget Edwards died on May 1, 1869, at the age of 56.
