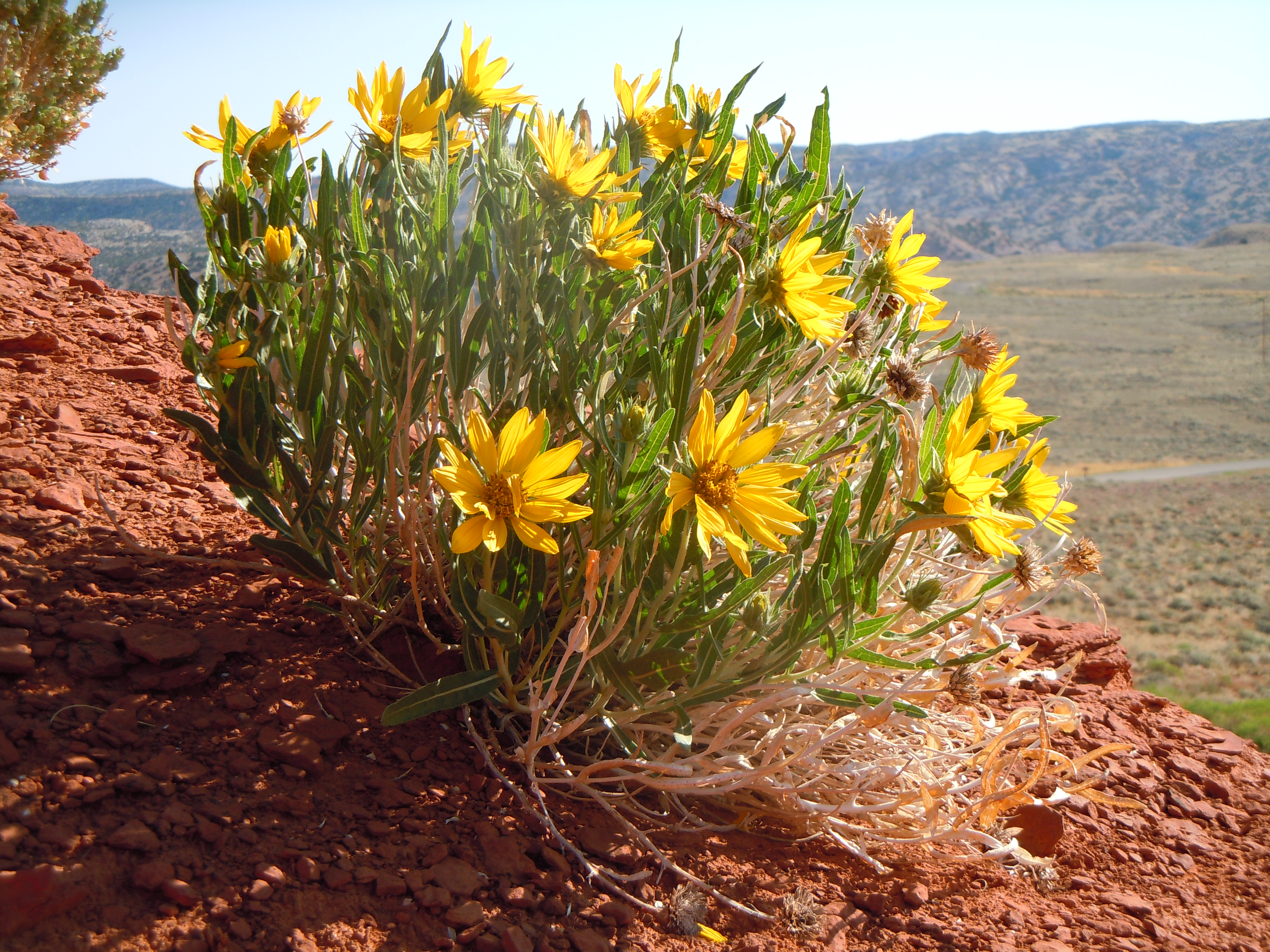
- Scabrethia scabra

Conservation status
- Apparently Secure (NatureServe)

Scientific classification
- Kingdom: Plantae
- Clade: Tracheophytes
- Clade: Angiosperms
- Clade: Eudicots
- Clade: Asterids
- Order: Asterales
- Family: Asteraceae
- Genus: Scabrethia; W.A.Weber
- Species: S. scabra

Binomial name
- Scabrethia scabra (Hook.) W.A.Weber

Synonyms
- Species synonymy: Wyethia scabra Hook.

= Scabrethia =

Genus of flowering plants

Scabrethia is a monotypic genus of North American flowering plants in the family Asteraceae.

There is only one recognized species, Scabrethia scabra, the badlands mule-ears, which is native to the western United States (Montana, Wyoming, Colorado, Utah, Arizona, New Mexico).

Subspecies

1. Scabrethia scabra subsp. scabra - (Montana, Wyoming, Colorado, Utah, Arizona
2. Scabrethia scabra subsp. attenuata (W.A.Weber) W.A.Weber - Utah, Arizona, New Mexico
3. Scabrethia scabra subsp. canescens (W.A.Weber) W.A.Weber - Colorado, Utah, Arizona, New Mexico

The genus was circumscribed by William Alfred Weber in Phytologia vol.85 (1) on page 20 in 1998 (published in 1999).

The genus name of Scabrethia is in honour of Nathaniel Jarvis Wyeth (1802–1856), who was an American businessman and explorer. Scabrous (meaning rough to the touch) and also Wyethia.
