= Willamette Cattle Company =

19th-century cattle ranching company in the Oregon Country

- Date: 1837
- Location: Willamette Valley North America
- Also known as: Wallamet or Willamet Cattle Company
- Participants: Ewing Young and others

The Willamette Cattle Company was formed in 1837 by pioneers in the Willamette Valley of present-day Oregon, United States. The company was formed with the express purpose of purchasing cattle in Mexican California. Nearly 750 head of cattle and 40 horses were purchased in total. Ewing Young led the overland party as they drove these animals north back to the Willamette Valley.

== Background ==
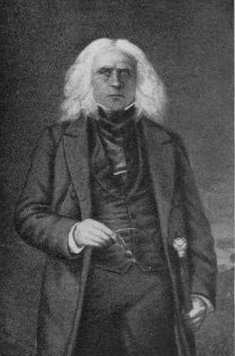
John McLoughlin

Prior to the activities of the Willamette Cattle Company, all cattle in the region were owned by the Hudson's Bay Company (HBC). Chief Factor John McLoughlin had for sometime a general arrangement with the Willamette settlers and missionaries for access to livestock. They were loaned out in pairs to farmers, never sold, and all calves born were then HBC property. The Methodist Mission in Oregon was in 1834 given "seven oxen, one bull and eight cows with their calves" by McLoughlin. Despite later claims by Samuel Thurston, no settler was charged for any cattle that died. The growing herds of cattle tended outside Fort Vancouver numbered only 27 in total in 1825, though by 1837 Slacum estimated their number closer to a thousand.

Navy Lieutenant William A. Slacum arrived on board the Loriot at Cape Disappointment on 22 December 1836. Slacum had been given orders by the United States Secretary of State John Forsyth to visit and detail "the different settlements of whites... and also at the various Indian villages" in the Oregon Country and in the Columbia River basin. John McLoughlin welcomed the naval official and informed Jason Lee of his arrival, who met Slacum at Champoeg in January. A common topic Slacum had with French-Canadian and American settlers residing in the Willamette Valley was about livestock. Finding the Willamette settlers in the supposed "thraldom of the Hudson Bay Company", Slacum proposed that cattle from Alta California be procured to end the local cattle monopoly of the HBC.

== Agreement ==
A variety of settlers, including missionaries such as Jason Lee of the Methodist Mission in Oregon, former French-Canadian HBC employees, and American pioneers agreed to create the joint-stock company in January 1837. A group of men would sail on the Loriot to Alta California and purchase as many head of cattle as they could. The articles of incorporation were signed on January 13, 1837 at Campment du Sable. The cattle would then be driven overland north to the Willamette Valley. Once there, they would distributed on an amount proportional to the amount invested by each subscriber. The company would pay $1 a day for expenses of those journeying to Mexican held California, in addition $20 per month in wages, in the form of cattle.. Ewing Young was selected as the leader of the company and in charge of going to California with Philip Leget Edwards as treasurer. In his report to the United States, Slacum "omitted a graceful and generous recognition of the aid given the Cattle Company by Dr. McLoughlin," as McLoughlin purchased half of all available shares.

=== Participants ===
- Investors only: John McLoughlin, Jason Lee, William Slacum, James A. O'Neil, Webley John Hauxhurst
- Investors and participants of the cattle drive: Ewing Young, William J. Bailey, Lawrence Carmichael, Pierre De Puis, Philip Leget Edwards Emert Ergnette, George Gay, Calvin Tibbets, John Turner.

== Expedition ==
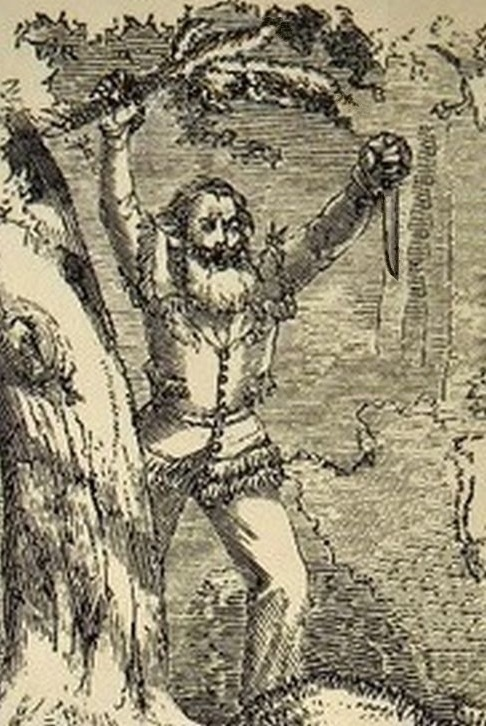
John Turner

On January 22, 1837, the overland party of eleven men and three Native American boys set sail aboard the Loriot from Wappatoo Island on the Willamette River. They first sailed into San Francisco in March. However permission to purchase any cattle had to come directly from Governor Juan Bautista Alvarado, who resided in Santa Barbara. At the provincial capital Young received permission to buy cattle from Alvarado. This agreement had the stipulation that the bovine had to come from government owned herds. Young then returned north and met the group in Monterey on May 12, 1837. The Willamette Cattle Company then purchased 746 head of cattle at $3 per head, held at two different locations. The group also purchased 40 horses at $12 each.

In June the enterprise had procured enough cattle and started driving them north back to the Willamette Valley. On July 27 the group began traveling through the Sacramento Valley after a minor delay. A stockpile of gunpowder became wet which required a small group of men to return to San Francisco to purchase more. They passed through the valley during the hot summer and crossed over the Siskiyou Mountains of northern California and southern Oregon. On September 14 they forded the Shasta River and eventually met group of Shasta natives, who courteously greeted the cattle drivers. A Shasta boy about the age of ten accompanied the cattle company for the day. Some of the men began to discuss killing natives of the area. William Bailey and George Gay murdered a native man and also attempted to kill the boy but he escaped. This violence was committed as they had previously skirmished with some Takelma natives of Rogue Valley directly to the north. The distinctions between the Shasta and Takelma weren't recognized by the outsider Willamette settlers. Edwards himself noted that the men Gay and Bailey had fought "may have been of another tribe."

The murder of the native man angered Young and raised tensions in an area that still had sizable populations of Native Americans. The following day matters only became more heated among the settlers. Gay, Bailey, Carmichael and Turner became aggressive and refused to follow orders from Young. Edwards recalled that "Curses, guns and knives were bandied for 15 minutes." Eventually however Young was able to reassert control and the party continued to drive the cattle north. Finally in October they returned to the non-indigenous settlements of the Willamette Valley. They had arrived with approximately 630 head of cattle and 15 horses left from what was purchased in California. Some of these animals were lost by natural causes, some were killed by natives, at least one was killed by the group for feed, and others simply wandered off. The remaining animals were then divided amongst the investors with a value of $8.50 per head, with Young receiving the largest allotment of 135. Expenses of the group that traveled to California totaled $42.75, with 200 cattle lost on the trip.

== Legacy ==
The procurement of cattle began to help break the dependence of the settlers on the cattle of the Hudson's Bay Company. Young's role made him the wealthiest of the settlers, which would lend a part in the attempt to form a government after his death in 1841 to deal with his heirless estate. However, even with over 600 cattle among the approximately 500 Europeans in the valley, there was still more demand for cattle. In time the settlers would come up with a novel enterprise with the Star of Oregon episode in 1840-1843 to get more cattle.

== Bibliography ==
- Corning, William A. (1989), Dictionary of Oregon History, Hillsboro, OR: Binfords & Mort
- Crawford, Medorum, ed. (1881), Transactions of the Eighth Annual Re-Union of the Oregon Pioneer Association, Salem, OR: E. M. Waite
- Dobbs, Caroline C. (1932), Men of Champoeg: A Record of the Lives of the Pioneers Who Founded the Oregon Government, Hillsboro, OR: Metropolitan Press
- Edwards, Philip Leget (1890), California in 1837. Diary of Col. Philip L. Edwards Containing An Account of a Trip to the Pacific Coast, A. J. Johnston & Co.
- Slacum, William A.; Forsyth, John (1912), "Slacum's Report on Oregon, 1836-7", The Quarterly of the Oregon Historical Society, 13 (2), Portland, OR: The Oregon Historical Society: 175–224, JSTOR 20609903
