= Willamette River Light =

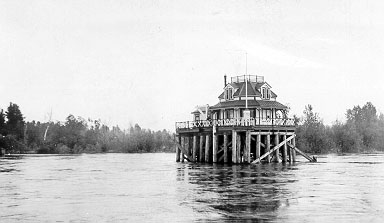
- Willamette River Lighthouse, date unknown
- Location: Portland, Oregon, United States
- Coordinates: 45°39′02″N 122°45′53″W

Tower
- Foundation: cluster of wooden pilings
- Construction: wood
- Automated: 1935
- Height: 23 ft (7.0 m)
- Shape: octagon

Light
- First lit: 1895
- Deactivated: 1935
- Light source: 20 candlepower oil lantern on small platform attached 1' below N corner of main platform
- Characteristic: F R

The Willamette River Light was a navigational lighthouse at the mouth of the Willamette River in the U.S. state of Oregon near Portland, which marked the confluence of the Columbia and Willamette Rivers. It existed as a lighthouse with keeper from 1895 to 1935, and as an unattended light from 1935 onwards. The original building burned down in 1959. The only visible remains of the station today are broken wooden pilings sticking out of the water near Kelley Point Park.

== Construction and operation (1895–1935) ==
As early as 1892, it was recognized that a light and fog signal at the mouth of the Willamette River would be "would be of great service to the commerce of that river" as the channel was narrow and could be difficult to locate in fog and other adverse weather conditions. Navigation was further complicated at the time by the presence of several small, low-lying islands around the mouth, that were often flooded, such as "Coon Island" (now part of Sauvie Island), "Pearcy Island" (now part of the mainland) and "Nigger Tom Island" (where Kelley Point Park lies today; now part of Pearcy Island), as well as numerous sloughs and backwaters. Many of these features no longer exist today, due to a combination of human activity and natural forces. Only Pearcy Island still appears on topographical maps, even though it is no longer an island.

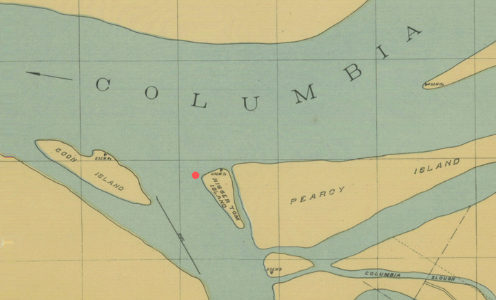
Dec. 1919 Commission of Public Docks map showing the mouth of the Willamette. The red dot off Nigger Tom Island (now Kelley Point) was the approximate location of the lighthouse

It was estimated that the proposed station could be established for a cost not exceeding $6,000 (approximately $202,434.73 in modern dollars). Funding in this amount was authorized on February 15, 1893, however, actual appropriation of funds would not be made until the sundry civil appropriation act authorized on August 18, 1894, with work commencing early the next year. The lighthouse would ultimately be built off the northern end of Nigger Tom Island (now Kelley Point). Designed by architect Carl W. Leick as an elegant one-and-a-half-story octagonal wood frame structure with 5 rooms atop wooden pilings, it was very similar to the later Desdemona Sands Light, which Leick also designed. The station was completed by October 30, 1895 and went into operation on December 31 of that year.

Rather than a dedicated rooftop lantern room, the light was a small oil lantern or "steamer lens" of 20 candlepower resting on a "small platform 1' below & projecting from N corner of main platform just in front of flag staff." It displayed a fixed red characteristic 23 feet above the water via a colored globe. The fog signal was a 1,200 lb bell operated by a No. 3 Gamewell mechanical striking mechanism, sounding once every ten seconds.

=== Known keepers ===
- Joseph Burchall (1895–1900)
- Daniel R. Hurlbut (1900–1906)
- John Dunphy (1906–1908)
- Mary Dunphy (1908)
- Thomas E. Stanfield (1908–1912)
- Christian Bing (1912)
- Hermann G. Halkett (1912–1928)
- Edgar P. Skinner (1929 – 1933)

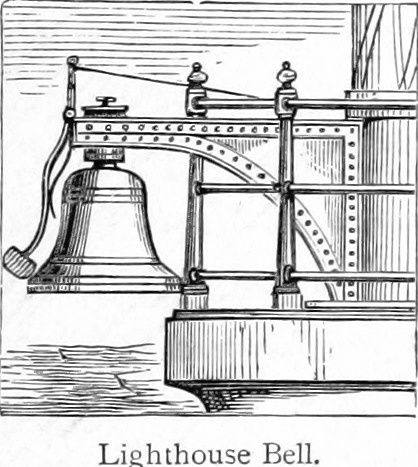
1884 illustration of lighthouse fog bell with clockwork striking mechanism. The bell used on the Willamette River Light was probably similar to this.

== Automation, abandonment and destruction (1935–1959) ==
Circa 1935, the decision was made to electrify and automate the station, eliminating the need for a keeper on-site. The light and fog signal were moved to a small platform at the end of a newly-constructed dike or breakwater built off the northern tip of Kelley Point, while the now-empty dwelling was eventually sold as office space to the Portland Merchants Exchange. In 1946, the Merchants Exchange had it moved a short distance by crane from its original location to lower pilings on Kelley Point Beach, where it was used as a watchtower to notify their main office in downtown Portland of incoming vessels on the river. The old station was abandoned for the final time after the Merchants Exchange built a new building across the river on Sauvie Island in 1956. On the evening of June 13, 1959 the abandoned structure was destroyed by a fire. The only visible remains of the station today are broken wooden pilings sticking out of the water near Kelley Point Park.

== See also ==
- List of lighthouses on the Oregon Coast
