= Fort William (Oregon) =

Fur trading outpost in Oregon, United States

Coordinates: 45°39′14″N 122°49′48″W

- Fur Trade Outpost
- Constructed: 1834
- Built for: Nathaniel Jarvis Wyeth
- Location: Sauvie Island, Oregon
- Continent: North America
- Later Ownership: Hudson's Bay Company
- Abandoned: unknown

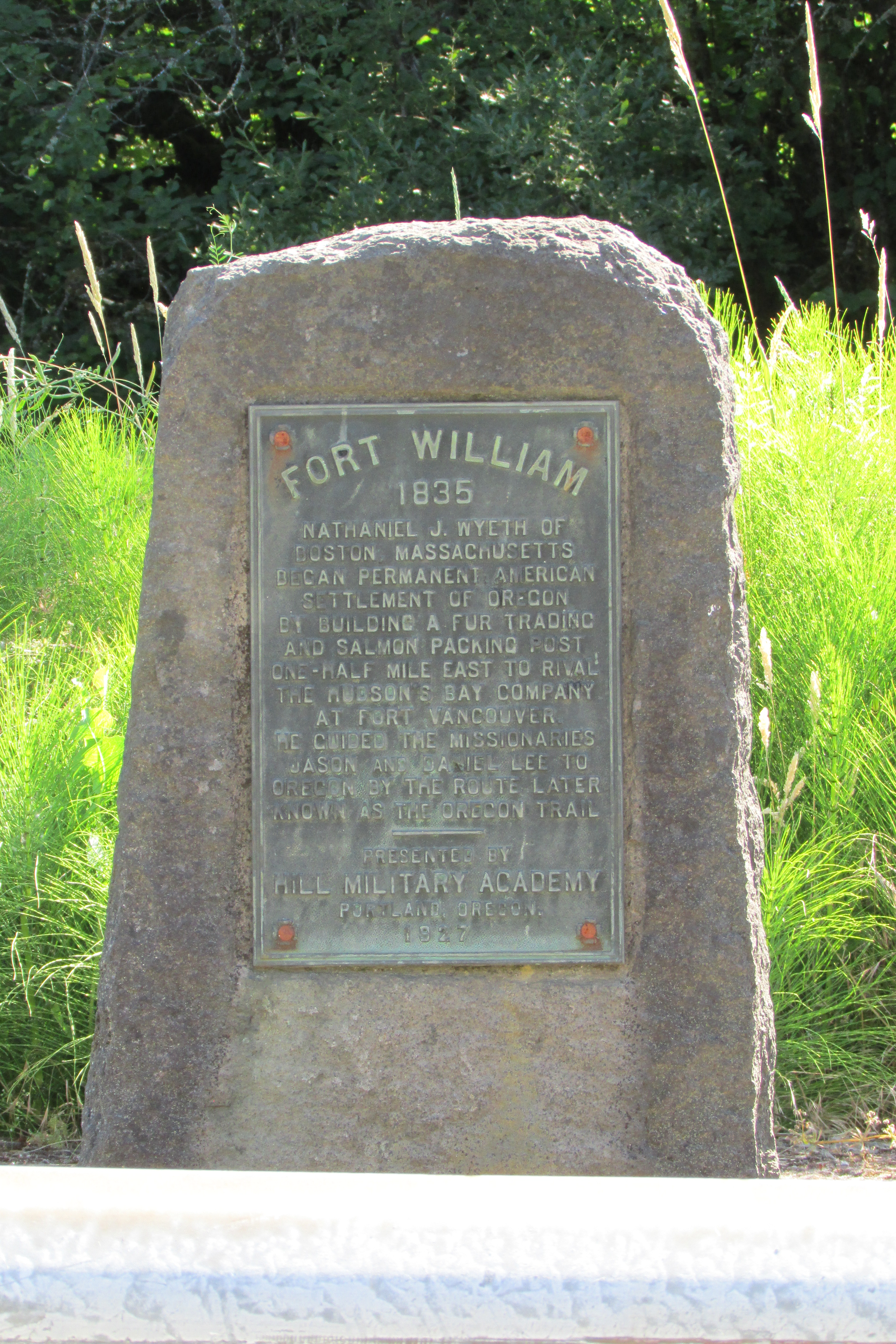
Fort William (Oregon)

Fort William was a fur trading outpost built in 1834 by the American Nathaniel Jarvis Wyeth, a Boston merchant, backed by American investors. It was located on the Columbia River on Wappatoo Island near the future Portland, Oregon. After a few years, in 1837 Wyeth sold the post to the British Hudson's Bay Company, which had much more power in the region from its base at Fort Vancouver on the north side of the Columbia River near Fort William.

In 1835, the fort settlement was the site of a murder and the first European American trial to be held in what is now the state of Oregon.

== Background ==
The fort was built by Nathaniel Jarvis Wyeth and his company as part of the Pacific Trading Company, a joint-stock company formed by Wyeth to exploit the fur trade in the Oregon Country. He also held Fort Hall in southeastern Idaho, to take advantage of trade in the Rocky Mountain region. His intention was to establish a fishery at Fort William, and export salmon to the East and Hawaii.

The island chosen was previously visited by the Lewis and Clark Expedition, and was previously inhabited by Native Americans. By the time Wyeth established his outpost, the island was void of any human habitation due to epidemics of infectious diseases that had swept through the lower Columbia region. As the Natives did not have any immunity to the new Eurasian diseases, nearly 90% of them died from smallpox, measles, and other illnesses following European contact.

== Location ==
Wappatoo Island, now Sauvie Island, lies just north of the main confluence of the Willamette and Columbia Rivers. The north end of the island is at the confluence with the Multnomah Channel. The post was built on the north end of the island, but was moved the next year toward the center of the island due to seasonal flooding.

Fort William was west of and on the opposite side of the river from the Hudson's Bay Company's (HBC) Fort Vancouver, established in 1824 on the north side of the Columbia. It was about 90 miles (140 km) upriver from the mouth of the Columbia and the HBC post of Fort George (formerly Fort Astoria).

== Operation ==
Wyeth and crew attempted various commercial interests from their outpost in the Pacific Northwest. They cut lumber and exported it to the Hawaiian Islands, built boats and canoes, and built a 60-foot (18 m)-long building to use in processing fish. They intended to ship salmon to the East and to Hawaii.

Wyeth and his employees also attempted to trap animals in the Deschutes River watershed of central Oregon. They were unsuccessful and the young company was unable to survive against the HBC and, in the Rocky Mountains, the American Fur Company, made a monopoly by John Jacob Astor. John Ball, one of Wyeth's men, wrote that they were no match for the HBC, which up fur trade prices as much as ten to one whenever any American trader appeared on the lower Columbia River.

The post had difficulties; its first supply ship sent to the Northwest Coast wrecked, and the second ship was late. The first ship was being used to export salmon. Wyeth abandoned the post in 1836 and the following year, leased it to the Hudson’s Bay Company. After Wyeth left the Pacific Northwest, John McLoughlin, the Chief Factor at Fort Vancouver, ordered Fort William demolished and a dairy farm built on the island. Wyeth also sold Fort Hall in present-day Idaho to the HBC the following year.

== Murder ==
Fort William was the site of the first public trial, by European Americans, in Oregon.

In 1835, the post's gunsmith, Thomas J. Hubbard, attacked and killed the fort's tailor in an argument over a young Native girl. The naturalist John Kirk Townsend was appointed magistrate, although he was a friend of Hubbard's. The jury acquitted Hubbard when they ruled the death was justifiable homicide. This verdict was likely the result of evidence that the tailor had alcohol-induced rages.
