= William A. Slacum =

American sailor and diplomat

- Born: c. 1799; Alexandria, Virginia
- Died: November 1, 1839 (aged 39–40)
- Military career
- Allegiance: United States of America
- Branch: United States Navy
- Service years: 1829–1839
- Rank: Lieutenant
- Unit: USS Potomac
- Other work: worked for State Department

William A. Slacum (c. 1799 - November 1, 1839) was an American sailor and diplomat. He served as a purser in the United States Navy and received a Presidential commission to gather information on the Oregon Country. At that time the region was under the jurisdiction of both the United States and Great Britain. Previously, Slacum served as a diplomat to Mexico.

== Early life ==
Slacum was likely born and raised in Alexandria, Virginia. Slacum's family included sister Mary Louisa Slacum Benham and brother George Washington Slacum who served as a consul in the State Department.

On June 8, 1829, William Slacum joined the United States Navy. During his naval career in 1831, Slacum was the purser aboard the USS Potomac as that ship spent four years at sea circumnavigating the globe. Then from 1835 to 1836 Slacum served in Mexico as a Special Diplomatic Agent for the United States. During this time Slacum sent a letter to President Andrew Jackson praising California, then under control of Mexico. This letter is credited with raising Jackson's interest in acquiring that region.

== Oregon ==
In 1835 Lieutenant Slacum was selected by President Jackson to travel to Oregon Country to gather information on the affairs of the region. Dated November 11, 1835, Slacum was ordered to inquire about the inhabitants and prospects of those white inhabitants living along the Columbia River. Slacum then sailed from Guaymas, Mexico on June 1, 1836, for the Sandwich Islands, arriving there on November 5, 1836. There he chartered the ship Loriot for the trip to the Columbia River sailing on November 24. On December 22, 1836, the Loriot sailed into the Columbia.

Slacum then spent time interviewing Hudson's Bay Company officials such as Dr. John McLoughlin and James Douglas at Fort Vancouver. After this he then spent four days on French Prairie with the missionary Jason Lee examining the settlements. Here Slacum helped to convince pioneer Ewing Young to give up his efforts to build a distillery and travel to California in order to purchase cattle that would then be driven overland back to Oregon. After this brief stay and information gathering, Lt. Slacum prepared to leave. On February 10, 1837, Slacum left the Columbia and sailed for California. By February 19, the Loriot with Slacum and some settlers in tow arrived at Fort Ross in California. Here the settlers and Slacum parted ways.

=== Willamette Cattle Company ===
While in the Willamette Valley, Slacum noted the dependency of the pioneers on the Hudson's Bay Company. This was especially true when it came to cattle, as the HBC only leased cattle to the settlers. Any offspring were the property of the HBC. So the lieutenant offered to take any of the settlers to California to buy cattle, and even provided $500 for the venture.

== Congress ==
After returning to the United States, William Slacum prepared a report on the information he gathered on the Northwest Coast. In his report that was read in Congress on December 18, 1837, Slacum details the activities in the region and advocated that the United States extend jurisdiction over this area with a border of no further south than the 49th parallel. Amongst other things, one recommendation of his was to cut a channel through Cape Disappointment in order to improve accessibility to the Columbia River and avoid the dangerous bar of the river.

On November 1, 1839, Slacum died. After his death, Slacum's estate tried to receive funds from the United States government for Slacum's expenses from his trip to the Oregon Country.
