= Loriot (ship) =

History

United States

General characteristics
- Class & type: brig
- Propulsion: sail

Loriot was an American sailing ship involved in exploration of the Pacific Northwest coast of North America. This brig took a member of a United States presidential expedition to survey land and the inhabitants of the area in the 1830s. The ship then transported members of the Willamette Cattle Company from Oregon Country to California in an effort to increase livestock in the Willamette Valley settlements.

== Early years ==
In the early 1830s the vessel traded between the Sandwich (Hawaiian) Islands and California under the ownership of Alpheus Basil Thompson. The ship had arrived on the islands as early as 1833 under a Captain Nye from Boston.

== Northwest Expedition ==
On November 24, 1836, the Loriot set sail from the Sandwich Islands for the Columbia River with Lieutenant William A. Slacum of the U.S. Navy. Earlier in 1836 President Andrew Jackson sent Lieutenant William A. Slacum to the west coast of North America to examine San Francisco Bay, Puget Sound, and the Columbia River estuary to assess these anchorages for their strategic value. Additionally, Slacum and his expedition were to examine the economy of the region. The ship, under the command of Captain Bancroft, arrived at the river on December 22, 1836. In the Oregon Country, Slacum offered to take some settlers to California on the Loriot to purchase cattle for the settlers to then drive north to Oregon. On February 10, 1837, the ship sailed out of the Columbia and towards California with Ewing Young and other members of the Willamette Cattle Company. Ship and passengers arrived at the Russian settlement of Bodega on February 20, 1837, where the pioneers disembarked with Slacum then continuing on his mission.

During the journey in 1836 the Loriot was involved in an event that created a minor diplomatic incident with Russia involving Russian-America lands. In that year the vessel attempted to make land in the Alexander Archipelago at Tuckessan harbor, but was denied by Russian authorities.

"When the captain of the Loriot asked permission to enter the harbor of Tateskey, he was ordered to "leave the waters of His Imperial Majesty.""
