= Hall J. Kelley =

American settler and writer

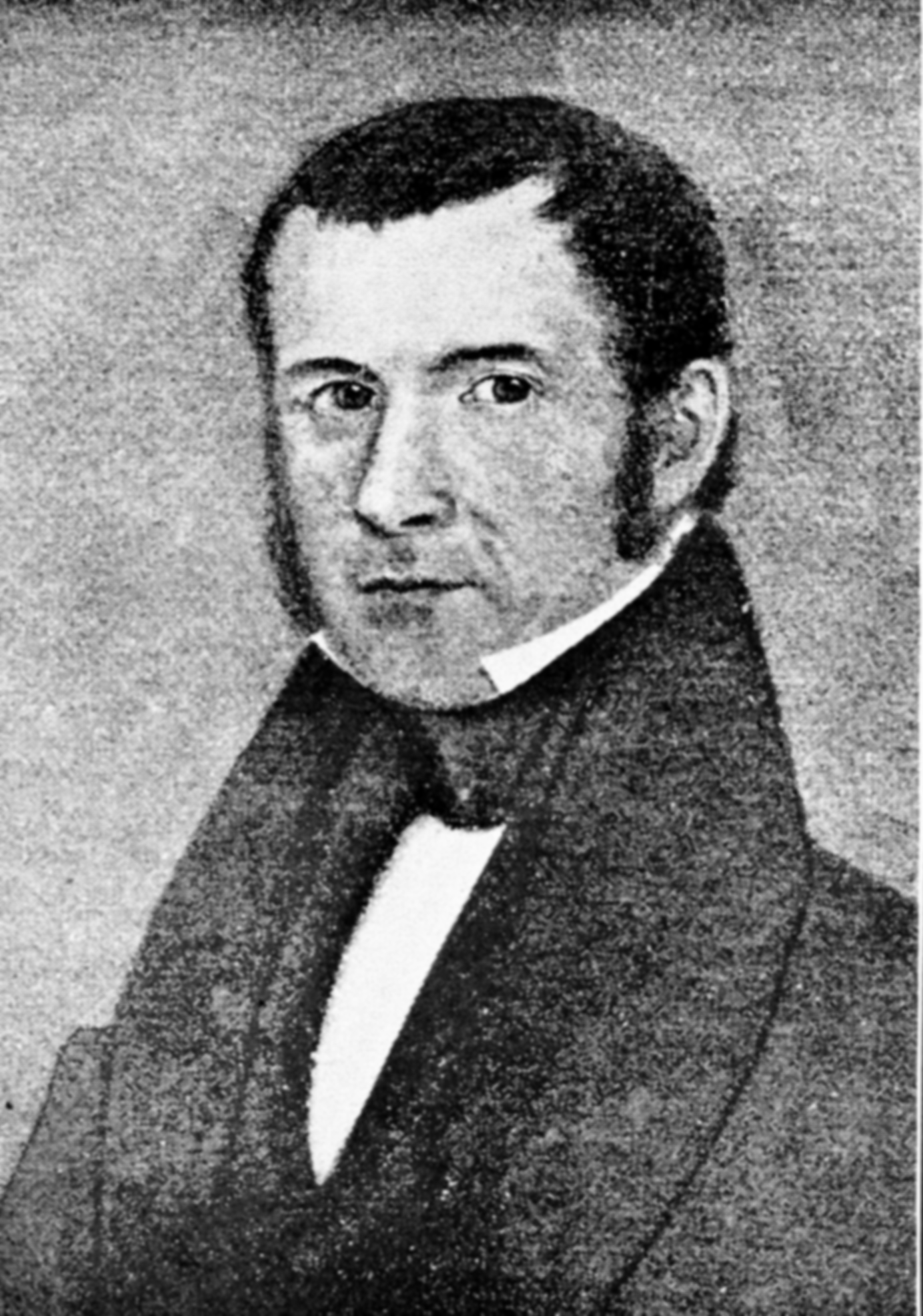
- Born: February 24, 1790; Northwood, New Hampshire
- Died: January 17, 1874 (aged 83); Massachusetts
- Occupation: writer

Hall Jackson Kelley (February 24, 1790 – January 20, 1874) was an American settler and writer from New England known for his strong advocacy for settlement by the United States of the Oregon Country in the 1820s and 1830s. A native of New Hampshire, he was a school teacher in Maine and Massachusetts, and a longtime resident of the latter state after graduating from Harvard College.

In 1834 Kelley led an expedition to Oregon Country. He became ill in the Northwest and was virtually deported by the head of the Hudson's Bay Company district office at Fort Vancouver. After his return to Massachusetts, he continued to write about the territory to encourage its settlement, also submitting materials to Congress. In 1868 he published a book about the region, by which time the emigrants on the Oregon Trail had already numbered into the tens of thousands. Kelley Point Park in Portland, Oregon, is named for him, as he had encouraged settlement at the confluence of the Willamette and Columbia rivers.

== Early years ==
Hall Kelley was born in Northwood, New Hampshire, on February 24, 1790. He left school and began teaching in Hallowell, Maine, at the age of 16.

He graduated from Middlebury in Vermont in 1814 with an A.M. degree, and then graduated from Harvard College in 1820. Kelley also worked as school principal in Boston from 1818 to 1823. On May 4, 1815, he married Mary Baldwin, daughter of a minister.

== Career ==
Kelley worked as a railroad surveyor in Maine. He also helped design a project for a canal from Boston to the Connecticut River, which was never built. He designed a railroad between Veracruz, Veracruz, and Mexico City.

As early as 1815, after reading about the Lewis and Clark Expedition and the expedition by Wilson Price Hunt, Kelley became interested in U.S. settlement of the area west of the Rocky Mountains. He tried to organize a group expedition overland to that region in 1828, but they could not get the funds for outfitting. He followed that effort with a failed attempt to colonize the Puget Sound area with an ocean-based expedition.

Also in 1828, he persuaded the Massachusetts Legislature to charter a society to promote U.S. settlement along the Columbia River. At the time, the Oregon Country was under joint administration of the U.S. and Great Britain pursuant to the Anglo-American Convention of 1818. Effectively the area was under control of the British Hudson's Bay Company, which actively discouraged U.S. settlement.

Kelley wrote articles to encourage U.S. settlers to move into Oregon Country. This included a memorial to the United States Congress on February 11, 1828, that laid out plans for a city where the Columbia River meets the Willamette River (present-day Portland, Oregon) and a proposal to name mountains in the Cascade Range after US presidents. In 1830, he published a Geographical Memoir of Oregon, which contained the first map of that territory ever compiled, as well as a settlement guide for prospective emigrants.

Kelley's writings were influential in inspiring Benjamin Bonneville to undertake his 1832 expedition to the West. He also espoused a theory as to the origin of the name Oregon, claiming it came from the Orjon River in Chinese Tartary.

== Expedition to Oregon ==
In 1831 Kelley sought to undertake an expedition to the west with Nathaniel Jarvis Wyeth of Boston, and they assembled a party of several hundred men. Delays forced the last-minute abandonment of the plan. Wyeth went west in 1832 without Kelley, having attracted investors in Boston.

In the autumn of 1832, Kelley set out with a smaller party for the West, traveling first to New Orleans. Most of the men left the expedition, causing great personal expense to Kelley. Hoping to salvage his expedition, he sailed south to Veracruz, Mexico. After many hardships, he recruited a party of U.S. citizens from Monterey, then under Mexican rule. The party crossed Mexico to California, where Kelley, along with Joseph Gale, joined the party of trader Ewing Young. The latter was moving into the Oregon Country backed by the missionary Jason Lee.

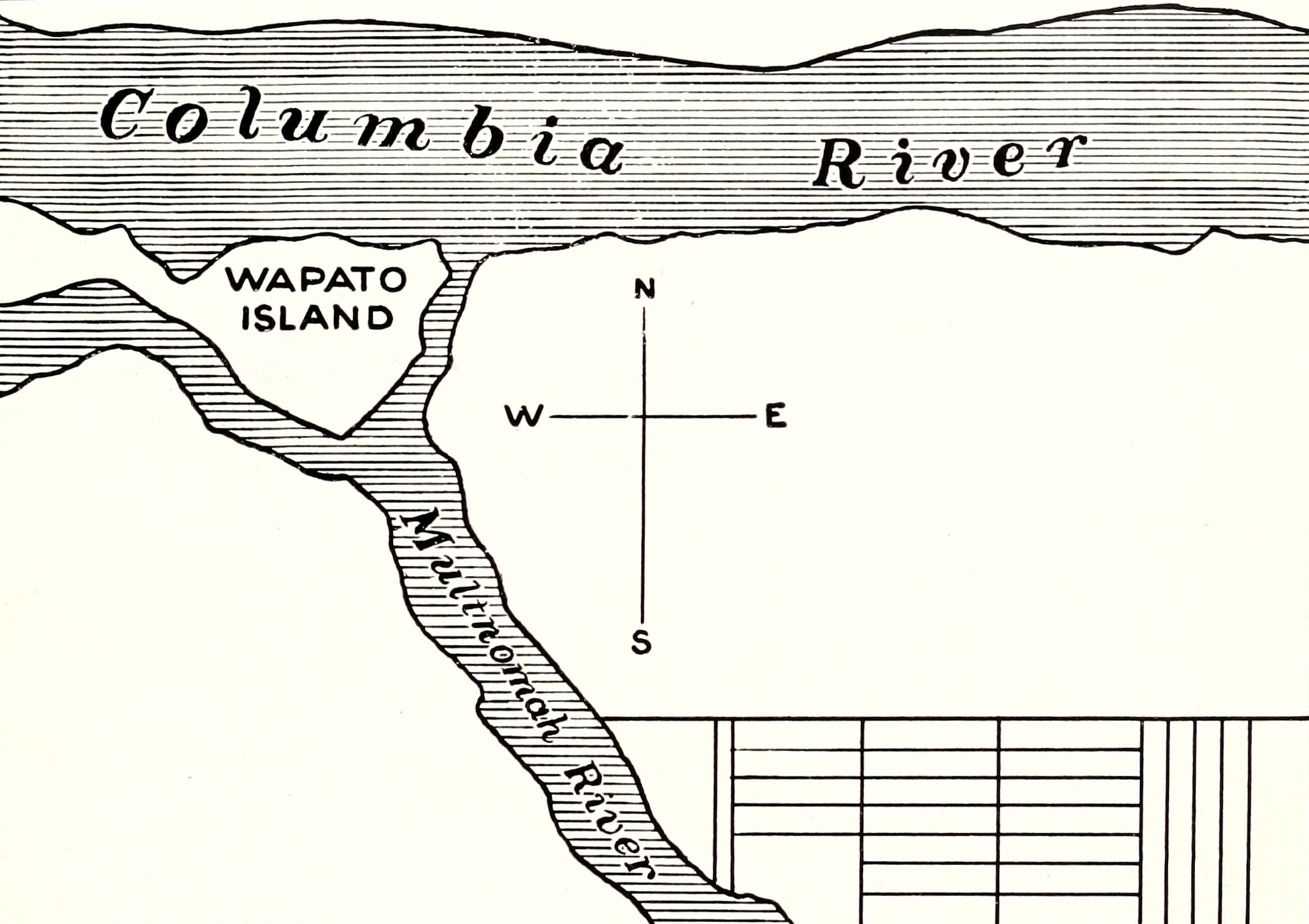
Kelley filed a land claim on the east bank of the Willamette River in 1834.

Kelley traveled northward by horse train with the Young party in 1834. On the trip north, Kelley fell ill with malaria while among the Coquille tribe in the Umpqua River valley near present-day Roseburg, Oregon. He was rescued by Michel LaFramboise, a Hudson's Bay Company (HBC) employee at Fort Umpqua near present-day Tyee.

Kelley wrote of the experience:

"Captain (LaFramboise) engaged an Indian chief to take me in a canoe, forty or fifty miles down the Umpqua. At first the chief declined, saying, that the upper part of the river was not navigable. Finally, in view of a bountiful reward, he consented to try... At the landing, the faithful Indian received of my property, a fine horse, saddle and bridle, a salmon knife and a scarlet velvet sash, and was satisfied."

Kelley and the party arrived at the Columbia River on October 27, 1834. In Oregon, Kelley and his party were directed to leave by John McLoughlin, district chief at Fort Vancouver of the Hudson's Bay Company (HBC). At this time, the HBC was very powerful in the Northwest and Canada; Great Britain and the United States disputed over the boundary and control in the Oregon Country. Both had private companies involved in fur trading.

After Kelley had recovered, McLoughlin gave him passage in 1835 to Hawaii. From there, Kelley found a ship and sailed home to Boston.

Kelley continued to write newspaper articles and memoirs based on his trip that encouraged Americans to settle Oregon. On February 16, 1839, parts of memoirs of his Oregon trip were presented to the United States Congress in a report on the region. Kelley's report was bound with a finely engraved map, showing the "Territory of Oregon" that was "compiled in United States Bureau of Topographical Engineers from the latest authorities under the direction of Col. J. J. Abert by Washi. Hood, 1838." He petitioned Congress 1851 for reimbursement for his expenses on the 1834 trip, but was unsuccessful.

== Later years ==
Kelley spent his later years in Three Rivers, Massachusetts. In 1868, he wrote A History of the Settlement of Oregon and of the Interior of Upper California, and of Persecutions and Afflictions of Forty Years' Continuance endured by the Author. Hall Jackson Kelley died in Massachusetts on January 20, 1874, at the age of 83, He was buried in Palmer.

== Legacy and honors ==
Kelley Point and Kelley Point Park, at the confluence of the Willamette and Columbia rivers in Portland, Oregon, are named for him.

During the early 1830s, Kelley led a campaign to rename the Cascade Range as the "Presidents Range", with each major peak to be named after a former President of the United States. Kelley intended Mount Hood to be named "Mount Adams" in honor of John Adams. A mapmaker mistakenly placed the Mount Adams name north of Mount Hood by about 40 miles (64 km), east of Mt. St. Helens. By coincidence, there was a mountain there with no official United States name. It became known as Mount Adams, despite the failure of Kelley's plan to rename the entire range.
