= Nathaniel Jarvis Wyeth =

American explorer and inventor (1802-1856)

Nathaniel J. Wyeth
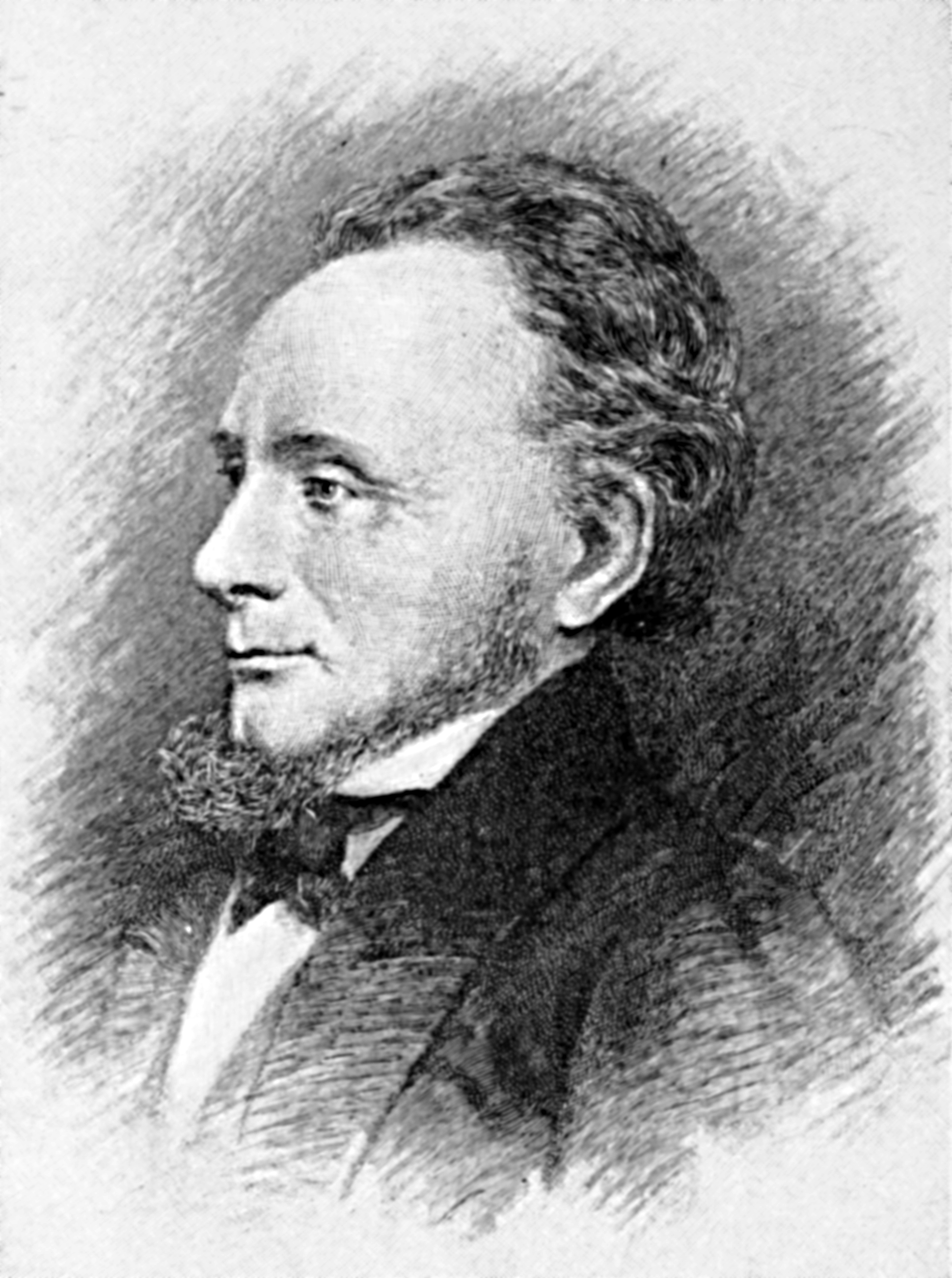
- Born: January 29, 1802; Cambridge, Massachusetts, US
- Died: August 31, 1856 (aged 54); Cambridge, Massachusetts, US
- Occupations: Inventor, entrepreneur, explorer

Nathaniel Jarvis Wyeth (January 29, 1802 – August 31, 1856) was an American inventor and businessman in Boston, Massachusetts who contributed greatly to its ice industry. Due to his inventions, Boston could harvest and ship ice internationally. In the 1830s, he was also a mountain man who led two expeditions to the Northwest and set up two trading posts, one in present-day Idaho and one in present-day Oregon.

In the 1830s, he became interested in the Northwest and planned an expedition with Hall J. Kelley. In 1832 he proceeded independently, traveling to Fort Vancouver. Two years later in 1834, he led another expedition, founding Fort Hall in present-day Idaho and Fort William in present-day Portland, Oregon. Unable to succeed commercially against the powerful Hudson's Bay Company, he sold both fur trading posts to it in 1837. At the time, both Great Britain and the United States had fur trading companies, settlers and others in the Pacific Northwest. After they settled the northern boundary in 1846, both forts were considered part of the United States and its territories. After returning to Boston, Wyeth managed his business affairs and amassed a fortune.

The Fort Hall site has been designated a National Historic Landmark and is considered the most important trading post in the Snake River Valley through the 1860s. More than 270,000 emigrants reached it while traveling the Oregon Trail.

== Early life ==
Wyeth was born in Cambridge, Massachusetts, to Jacob and Elizabeth (Jarvis) Wyeth. He married Elizabeth Jarvis Stone on January 29, 1824.

He began his working career in the 1820s by acting as foreman for a company that harvested ice from Fresh Pond in Cambridge, and thus helping Boston's "Ice King" Frederic Tudor to establish New England's ice trade with the Caribbean, Europe, and India. He invented tools that revolutionized the ice-harvesting business and increased its productivity greatly. He also invented aboveground ice houses, with double walls for insulation. As the Dictionary of American Biography states, "[I]t was said at his death that practically every implement and device used in the ice business had been invented by Nat Wyeth."

== Oregon Country ==
When Wyeth was 30, Hall J. Kelley convinced him that the Oregon Country had excellent commercial prospects. Wyeth believed that he could become wealthy in the Oregon fur industry, develop farms for growing crops (especially tobacco), and start a salmon fishing and processing industry to rival New England's cod industry. When Kelley's plans for an expedition were long delayed, Wyeth formed one of his own, and as he wrote in his expedition journal:

On 10 March 1832 I left Boston in a vessel with 20 men for Baltimore where I was joined by four more, and on the 27th left to Rail Road for Fredrick Md (Frederick, Maryland) from thence to Brownsville we marched on foot, and took passage from that place to Liberty Mo. (Note: While Wyeth's quote says "Liberty, MO" it was, in fact, Independence, MO, according to Pioneers of The Old West series by Time Life Books, text by Huston Horn, New York, New York, 1974, page 48, and according to Westward - The Epic Crossing of the American Landscape, Gerald Roscoe and David Larkin, The Monticelli Press, New York, New York, 1995, page 134. Independence was the point of embarkation at the time, not Liberty, which was and is on the north side of the Missouri River.) on various steamboats, which place we left for the prairies on 12 May with 21 men, three having deserted, and on 27 May three more deserted.

At Independence, Missouri, they joined William Sublette, who was taking supplies to the planned Rendezvous of trappers at Pierre's Hole, just west of the Teton mountains. (Note: While Wyeth's departure was preceded by a couple of weeks by Captain Benjamin Bonneville, Bonneville was leading a train of wagons and therefore traveled more slowly. At some point Wyeth's group passed Bonneville's and reached the Rendezvous in time, while Bonneville did not reach the Rendezvous site until more than a month later after it was over.) From Independence the expedition's route proceeded along much of what would later become known as the Oregon Trail along the Platte River valley, through the Black Hills, (Note: At the time the name "Black Hills" was applied to what are now called the Laramie Mountains, not to the Black Hills of South Dakota) South Pass, the upper Green River watershed, Jackson Hole, and Teton Pass to Pierre's Hole and the Rendezvous of 1832. After the Battle of Pierre's Hole, seven more of his group left and one had died in the battle, leaving him with just seven of his original group. After the Rendezvous, Milton Sublette guided him southwest down the Snake River as far as the Raft River. From there, with what remained of his party, Wyeth continued down the Snake River approximately to the mouth of the Boise River, where he left the Snake to cross through the Grande Ronde Valley and the Blue Mountains to Fort Nez Percés where Pierre Pambrun gave him a new suit and arranged transportation down the Columbia River. Wyeth and his associates arrived at Fort Vancouver on October 29. Several days later news was relayed to him that the ship charted to transport the necessary supplies for the venture, the Sultana, had sunk. For his remaining employed men the news was demoralizing as the November 6 entry of Wyeth's journal notes, "...my men came forward and unanimously desired to be released from their engagement with a view of returning home as soon as possible.... I am now afloat on the great sea of life without stay or support but in good hands i.e. myself and providence". Some of his men signed up with the Hudson's Bay Company. Two, Wiggin Abbott and "Woodman" stayed with Wyeth as "engages" instead of shareholders. The three canoed up the "Wallamet or Multnoma River" and found a few former Hudson's Bay Company French Canadians farming above the falls. Wyeth was so favorably impressed with the Willamette Valley that he wrote, "I have never seen country of equal beauty except the Kanzas country and I doubt not will one day sustain a large population. If this country is ever colonized this is the point to commence."

After spending the winter months at Fort Vancouver, Wyeth departed overland with Francis Ermatinger who was headed to the Flathead Post. After reaching the trade station in February 1833 Ermatinger mentioned he had previously come to a Rendezvous with supplies to sell to the mountain men in return for furs. Wyeth took upon the idea and while at Fort Colvile sent letters to the Hudson's Bay Company Governor George Simpson along with John McLoughlin, the manager of the Columbia District, offering a business proposal. Wyeth offered to purchase supplies from Fort Vancouver then undersell American merchants rendezvous and resell the gained furs at a set price back at Vancouver. Additionally, he stated his intentions to avoid trapping around any HBC post, and limit trapping to south of the Columbia. Wyeth and his remaining men moved with the party of Benjamin Bonneville to the 1833 Rendezvous, held in the vicinity of modern Daniel, Wyoming on the Horse Creek. Before leaving the gathering, Wyeth negotiated with Milton Sublette and Thomas Fitzpatrick of the Rocky Mountain Fur Company to furnish $3,000 worth of supplies for the Rocky Mountain Fur Company at the next rendezvous. He reached Independence, Missouri, by late September, and then went on to Boston. Although the expedition had not been a commercial success, he brought with him a collection of plants previously unknown to botany.

In 1834 Wyeth outfitted a new expedition, with plans for establishing fur-trading posts, a salmon fishery, a colony, and other developments. Included in the company were two noted naturalists, Professor Thomas Nuttall (1786–1859) of Harvard University, and John Kirk Townsend, plus the missionary Jason Lee. Wyeth's party headed to the rendezvous held on the Hams Fork, near by what is now Granger, Wyoming, with 13,000 pounds of goods and reached there on the 19th of June. William Sublette had become aware of the contract between Wyeth and the Rocky Mountain Fur Company and forced the company to forfeit the contract. Continuing west with Thomas McKay, a stepson of McLoughlin, Wyeth quickly founded Fort Hall (July 1834) in southeastern Idaho. The Methodists were guided by McKay to Fort Nez Percés, but by the time Wyeth reached there he had left back east, leaving the missionaries with Pambrun. Unknown to Wyeth at that time was the construction of Fort Boise by McKay to undermine Fort Hall. Following the Columbia River Wyeth's second trading station Fort William was built on Wapato Island (later called Sauvie Island), near present-day Portland, Oregon. Upon seeing the deserted Multnomah villages caused from recent disease epidemics, Wyeth noted that "providence has made room for me and with doing them [Natives] more injury than I should if I had made room for myself viz Killing them off."

Wyeth reports in his journal that on September 15, 1834, he

met the Bg [Brig] May Dacre in full sail up the River boarded her and found all well she had put into Valparaíso having been struck by Lightning and much damaged. Capt Lambert was well and brot me 20 Sandwich Islanders and 2 Coopers 2 Smiths and a Clerk.

Despite some success in its trapping, Wyeth and his company could not compete against the British Hudson's Bay Company (HBC), whose operations undercut his trading posts. Fort Vancouver remained the primary trading post on the Columbia, with Fort William generally ignored. Fort Hall, while later an important stop on the Oregon Trail, did not net much profits with Fort Boise undercutting his activities. In 1837, after selling Fort William and Fort Hall to the HBC, Wyeth returned to Boston in debt of $20,000 after five years of attempts at establishing a commercial outpost in the Oregon Country.

The second expedition was scientifically useful. Nuttall collected and identified 113 species of western plants, including sagebrush, Artemisia tridentata and "mule's ear", a sunflower genus, which he named Wyethia in Wyeth's honor.

== Later life ==
Although he failed in his two ventures in the Northwest, Wyeth returned to the ice-harvesting industry and established a sizable fortune. He continued to strongly support the occupation of Oregon by American settlers, and encouraged many to go west, although he did not cross the Mississippi again.

He died at his home in Cambridge on August 31, 1856.

== Honours ==
He is honoured in the naming of 2 taxa of plants;

- Wyethia (in the Asteraceae family), by Thomas Nuttall in 1834.
- Scabrethia (also in the Asteraceae family), by William Alfred Weber in 1999.

== General references ==
- "Nathaniel Jarvis Wyeth." Dictionary of American Biography, Base Set. American Council of Learned Societies, 1928–1936. Reproduced in Biography Resource Center. Farmington Hills, Mich.: The Gale Group, 2001.
- The Correspondence and Journals of Captain Nathaniel J. Wyeth, 1831-6, Eugene, Oregon: University of Oregon Press, 1899, available as free e-book at Google Books.
- The Journals of Captain Nathaniel J. Wyeth's Expeditions to the Oregon Country 1831-1836. Don Johnson, ed. Fairfield, Washington: Ye Galleon Press, 1984
- Drake, Samuel Adams (1900). "Nathaniel J. Wyeth/"Oregon Expeditions"" . Oregon Historical Quarterly. 1 (1).
