= McCarver =

McCarver is a surname. Notable people with the surname include:

- Charles P. McCarver (c. 1851–1892), American politician
- Jack McCarver (1896–1959), American racing driver
- Morton M. McCarver (1807–1875), American pioneer and politician
- Tim McCarver (1941–2023), American baseball player and sportscaster

== See also ==
- McCarver Neighborhood, Tacoma, Washington United States
- Morton Matthew McCarver House, Oregon City, Oregon, United States
- Tim McCarver Stadium, a baseball stadium located in Memphis, Tennessee
