= Asa Lovejoy =

American politician (1808–1882)

Speaker of the Provisional Legislature of Oregon
- In office December 1, 1846 – December 19, 1846
- Preceded by: Henry A. G. Lee
- Succeeded by: Robert Newell

Speaker of the Oregon Territory House of Representatives
- In office July 16, 1849 – September 29, 1849
- Preceded by: Levi A. Rice (Provisional Legislature)
- Succeeded by: Ralph Wilcox
- Constituency: Clackamas County

Delegate to the Oregon Constitutional Convention
- In office August 17, 1857 – September 18, 1857
- Constituency: Clackamas County

Personal details
- Born: March 14, 1808 Groton, Massachusetts, U.S.
- Died: September 10, 1882 (aged 74) Oregon, U.S.
- Party: Democratic
- Spouse: Elizabeth McGary

Asa Lawrence Lovejoy (March 14, 1808 – September 10, 1882) was an American pioneer and politician in the region that would become the U.S. state of Oregon. He is best remembered as a founder of the city of Portland, Oregon. He was an attorney in Boston, Massachusetts before traveling by land to Oregon; he was a legislator in the Provisional Government of Oregon, mayor of Oregon City, and a general during the Cayuse War that followed the Whitman massacre in 1847. He was also a candidate for Provisional Governor in 1847, before the Oregon Territory was founded, but lost that election.

Lovejoy continued his political career during territorial period as a member of both chambers of the Oregon Territorial Legislature; he served as the first Speaker of the Oregon House of Representatives in 1849. He was also a delegate to the Oregon Constitutional Convention held in 1857 that paved the way for Oregon's entry into the Union. He was part owner of the Oregon Telegraph newspaper, and worked on railroad development in the Willamette Valley after leaving politics. Lovejoy Street in Northwest Portland and the Lovejoy Fountain in Downtown Portland are named in his honor.

== Early life ==
Lovejoy was born in Groton, Massachusetts, on March 14, 1808. His parents were Betsy Lovejoy (née Lawrence) and Doctor Samuel Lovejoy. In the Eastern United States, he attended college at both Cambridge College and Amherst College, before studying law and passing the Maine bar to become an attorney. After leaving Boston he moved west to Missouri, but left the bottom lands of that state for the unorganized Oregon Country due to poor health.

== Oregon Country ==
Lovejoy first traveled to the Oregon Country in 1842 over the Oregon Trail. He was part of a wagon train led by Elijah White that arrived at the Whitman Mission in what is now eastern Washington State. During this trip he was briefly held captive with another immigrant by Native Americans before arriving at the Whitman's. At the mission, Lovejoy agreed to join Marcus Whitman on a trip to return east during the winter. Lovejoy returned to Oregon in 1843, as part of the Great Migration that helped open up the Oregon Trail to large migrations, settling in the Willamette Valley. Upon returning to the region, Lovejoy set up a law practice in Oregon City, the seat of government during the Provisional Government period.

=== Portland ===
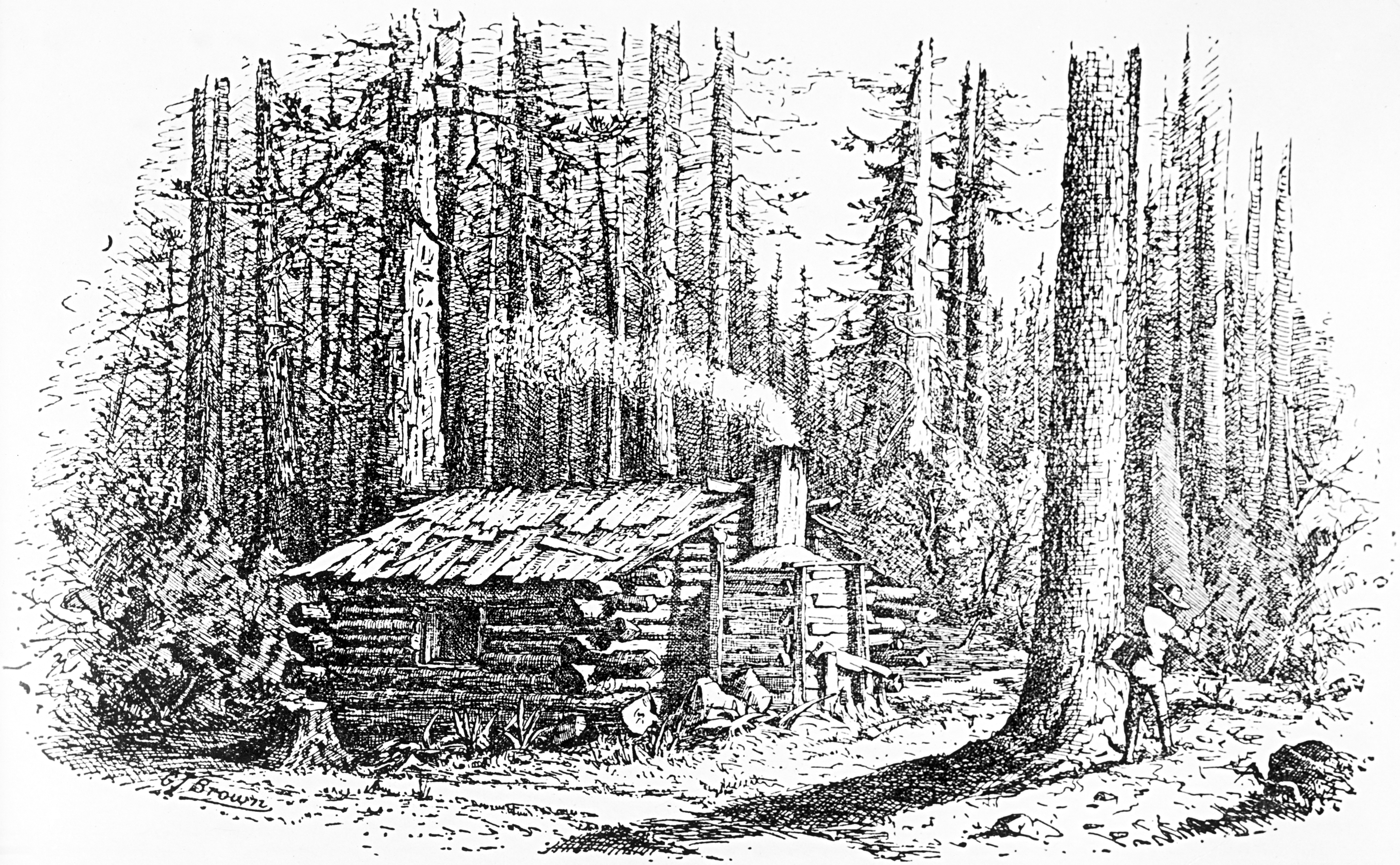
Lovejoy and Pettygrove built Portland's first house, a log cabin near the present intersection of Washington Street and Front Avenue, in 1844.

In 1843, Lovejoy and traveling companion William Overton split a claim to a 640 acres (2.6 km^{2}) tract along the Willamette River. This site would later become part of downtown Portland. Overton held the land, as Lovejoy settled elsewhere. Overton soon sold his share to Francis Pettygrove and Lovejoy and Pettygrove held their famous coin toss in 1845 to decide the name of the city which was being platted on the claim. Each desired to name the area after his hometown. Pettygrove, from Portland, Maine, won the toss, and the town site became known as Portland, Oregon. The two would plat sixteen blocks of the town that year; Lovejoy later sold his stake to Benjamin Stark in 1845. Also in 1845, Lovejoy married Elizabeth McGary. They would have five children: William, Amos, Ada, Elizabeth, and Nellie. In 1846, he was the last administrator of the Ewing Young estate, whose death had precipitated the formation of the Provisional Government of Oregon.

== Political career ==
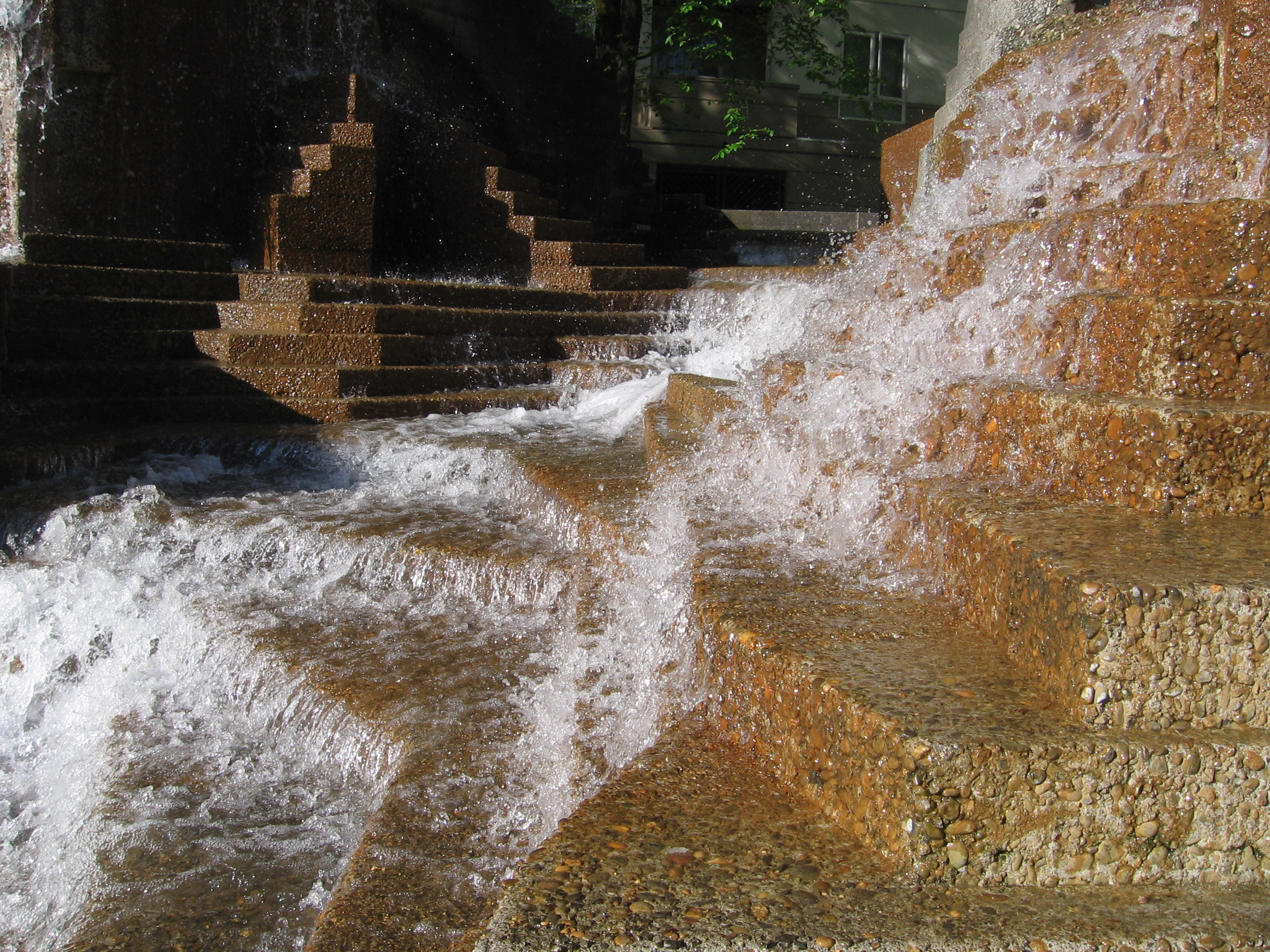
Lovejoy Fountain in downtown Portland

In 1844, Asa Lovejoy was elected to the Provisional Legislature of Oregon to represent Clackamas District. Lovejoy ran for the newly created office of governor that replaced the Executive Committee in 1845 with the adoption of the Second Organic Laws of Oregon. George Abernethy won the election after he received the most votes with 228, followed by Osbourne Russell with 130, William J. Bailey with 75, and finally Lovejoy with 71 votes. Though he lost the election for governor, he was elected as mayor of Oregon City that year.

Lovejoy returned to the legislature in 1846 and served as Speaker of the body. In 1847, Lovejoy ran against Abernethy for governor a second time. Lovejoy lost the election 536 to 520. From 1847 to 1848, he served as adjunct general during the Cayuse War, the war resulting from the Whitman Massacre.

Lovejoy was elected in 1848 to what would be the final session of the Provisional Legislature, which was held in late 1848 into early 1849. However, Lovejoy now representing Vancouver District north of the Columbia River resigned before the session started. In September 1848, he traveled with a group to California during the California Gold Rush, but returned aboard the brig Undine in January 1849 after six weeks in California. During the same session he resigned from, he was selected by the Provisional Legislature as Supreme Judge of the government on February 16, 1849, but never served and the Provisional government was dissolved the following month with the arrival of the territorial government.

Once the government of the Oregon Territory arrived in March 1849, a new legislature with two chambers was established. Lovejoy was elected to the first session of this legislature, first serving in the lower chamber Oregon House of Representatives. Representing Clackamas District again, he also became the first Speaker of the Oregon Territorial Legislature. In 1851, he returned to the legislature, serving in the upper chamber Council. The following year, he remained in the Council, but now elected as a Whig Party politician. In 1854, he was back in the House of Representatives, and in 1856 he served in one final session, now as a Democratic Party member.

In 1857, Lovejoy represented Clackamas County at the Oregon Constitutional Convention in Salem. The convention created the Oregon Constitution in preparation for the territory becoming a U.S. state. Lovejoy, still a Democrat, served as the chairperson of the boundaries committee and also served on the committee responsible for matters concerning the legislature. The convention finished on September 18, 1857, and submitted the finished document to a vote of the public on November 9. This vote approved the Constitution and on February 14, 1859, Oregon entered the Union as the 33rd state.

== Later life and legacy ==
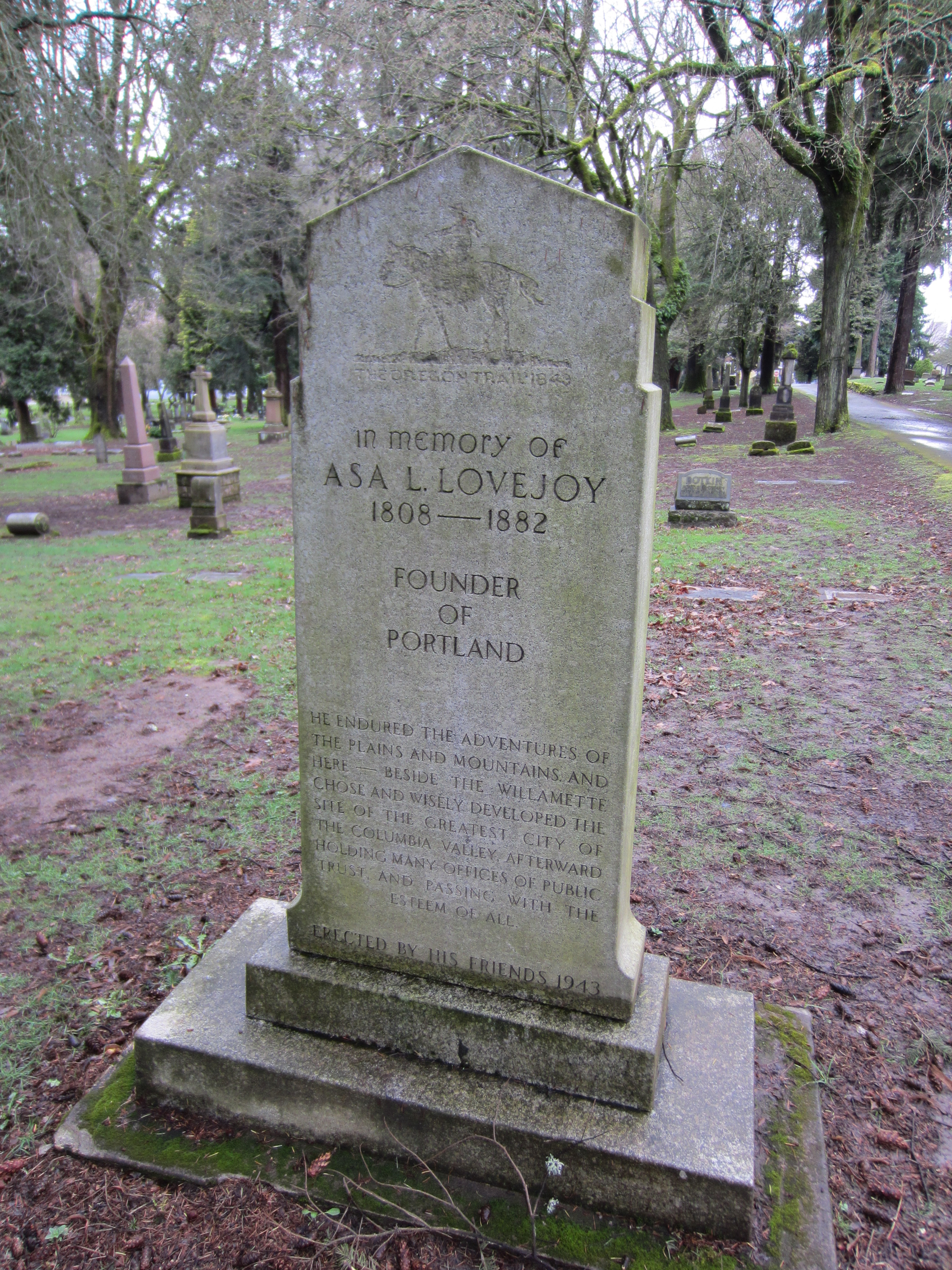

He endured the adventures of the plains and mountains, and here—beside the Willamette chose and wisely developed the site of the greatest city of the Columbia valley, afterward holding many offices of public trust, and passing with the esteem of all.

— Epitaph on Lone Fir Cemetery gravestone, 1943.

In his later years he was involved in a variety of business ventures in Oregon, including as a major shareholder in the Oregon Telegraph newspaper and vice-president of the Willamette Steam Navigation Company. He served on the Portland Public Schools board from 1868-1871. Lovejoy died on September 10, 1882, at the age of 74 and was buried in the Masonic section at Lone Fir Cemetery in Portland. Lovejoy Street in Portland is named after him, and the character Reverend Timothy Lovejoy in The Simpsons is named after this street. The fountain at Lovejoy Fountain Park in downtown Portland is named in his honor.

== See also ==
- History of Portland, Oregon
