= Absalom J. Hembree =

American politician (1813–1856)

Member of the Oregon Territorial Legislature
- In office 1849, 1851, 1854
- Constituency: Yamhill County

Member of the Provisional Legislature of Oregon
- In office 1846–1849
- Constituency: Yamhill District

Personal details
- Born: December 14, 1813 White County, Tennessee
- Died: April 10, 1856 (aged 42) Washington Territory
- Party: Democrat
- Spouse: Nancy Dodson

Absalom Jefferson Hembree (December 14, 1813 – April 10, 1856) was an American soldier and politician in what became the state of Oregon. A native of Tennessee, he served in the Provisional Legislature of Oregon and the Oregon Territorial Legislature before being killed in action during the Yakima War.

== Early years ==
Absalom Hembree was born in Warren County, Tennessee, on December 14, 1813, to James and Nancy Hembree (née Pettie). On January 14, 1835, he married Nancy Dodson in White County, Tennessee, and the two would have ten children. In 1843, he and his family that now included three children (William, Ann, and Nancy), along with an older brother Joel, immigrated to the Oregon Country across the Oregon Trail. Hembree's infant son died along the trail, with the family arriving in Oregon City where they stayed until the Spring of 1844.

== Oregon ==
In 1844, the family moved to the newly organized Yamhill District and settled on a land claim near the present community of Carlton. Hembree's land claim was one of the first in what became a Yamhill County. There the family raised livestock and Absalom operated a store in nearby Lafayette. While in Oregon, the couple would have seven more children. Hembree served as a director of the Portland & Valley Plank Road Company that started construction on Canyon Road in 1849, and was involved with the creation of the Pacific Telegraph Company in 1855.

In 1846, Hembree was elected to the Provisional Legislature of Oregon to represent the Yamhill District, and won re-election the following year. He won election to the final session of that body in 1848, serving through the early 1849 session. The creation of the Oregon Territory and take over by the federal government superseded the Provisional Government of Oregon's authority. In 1849, he was elected to serve in the first session of the Oregon Territorial Legislature, representing Yamhill County. Hembree served again in the 1851 and 1854 sessions in the lower Oregon House of Representatives as a Democrat. He had run for the office of U.S. Marshall for the territory, but lost to Joseph Meek.

== Death and legacy ==
In 1855, the Yakima War between the United States government and Native Americans broke out in the eastern part of the Washington Territory. Following the defeat of Major Haller on October 5, 1855, Hembree and many others in the Willamette Valley volunteered to fight the Native Americans. A captain, he was in charge of a company of troops when he and a small group of his men were doing reconnaissance on Satus Creek on April 10, 1856. The group was ambushed and Hembree was killed, the lone casualty for the Americans. His body was returned to Oregon and he was given a Masonic burial at the Hembree Cemetery in Yamhill County. On June 20, 1920, the Washington State Historical Society placed a monument at the site of his death.
