= Henry A. G. Lee =

American journalist

Speaker of the Provisional Legislature of Oregon
- In office December 10, 1845 – December 19, 1845
- Preceded by: Robert Newell
- Succeeded by: Asa Lovejoy
- Constituency: Clackamas District

Member of the Provisional Legislature of Oregon
- In office June 24, 1845 – December 19, 1845
- Constituency: Clackamas District

Captain of the Oregon Rifles

Personal details
- Born: circa 1818 Virginia
- Died: 1851 At sea

Henry A. G. Lee (c. 1818 – 1851) was a soldier and politician in Oregon Country in the 1840s. A member of Virginia's Lee family, he was part of the Fremont Expedition and commanded troops during the Cayuse War in what became the Oregon Territory. He also was a member of the Oregon Provisional Government and the second editor of the Oregon Spectator.

== Early life ==
Lee was born in Virginia, circa 1818. In 1843, Lee was a part of John C. Frémont's Army expedition through the Western United States, including what is now the state of Oregon. During the expedition he was sent with a note to Kit Carson ordering Carson to catch up to the group, and later when the party split into two Lee remained with Fremont before returning to Oregon on September 22.

== Oregon Country ==
Fellow pioneer John Minto described Lee as a "natural leader," but contrasted his style with that of James Nesmith; Lee, he contended, was less domineering than Nesmith, and attracted young men eager to serve. After settling in Oregon, Lee was elected to the Provisional Legislature of Oregon in 1845. He represented the Clackamas District and served as Speaker of the body for part of the December session. In 1846, Lee became the second editor of the Oregon Spectator, the first newspaper in the region. He replaced William G. T'Vault and would remain editor for nine issues of the paper before George Law Curry took over the position.

=== Cayuse War ===
On November 29, 1847, the Whitman Mission near present-day Walla Walla, Washington, was attacked by members of the Cayuse tribe in the Whitman Massacre. This led to further violence in the ensuing Cayuse War prosecuted by the Provisional Government of Oregon and later the United States government against the Native Americans in what became the Oregon Territory in 1848. In December 1847 when word of the attack reached the Willamette Valley, the Provisional Government and Gov. George Abernethy called for volunteers to fight against the Cayuse, with Lee volunteering and being selected as captain of a 50-man unit to be dispatched immediately to The Dalles. The Oregon Rifles under the command of Lee formed on December 8, and gathered at Fort Vancouver on December 10 where they purchased supplies from the Hudson's Bay Company (HBC) post. The HBC would not extend credit to the Provisional Government, so the volunteer soldiers pledged their individual credit in order to purchase supplies with the hope that the government would be able to repay them at a later time. The group was to protect the Methodist Mission there and prevent any hostile forces from reaching the Willamette Valley.

While preparation were made for war, the Provisional Government also attempted to negotiate with the Cayuse and other tribes. Lee was appointed as one of the peace commissioners, along with Joel Palmer and Robert Newell to seek a truce with the Cayuse and demand they turn over the killers from the massacre at the start of hostilities. Lee and his troops, with John E. Ross and Joseph Magone as lieutenants, then marched off to The Dalles, arriving on December 21. Upon arriving there, Lee led his men against a band of Native Americans and drove them off, but not before they stole 300 head of cattle. There the troops built a stockade and named the post Fort Lee for the commander, though the small fortification was also called Fort Wascopam. Lee's forces continued defending the Wascopam Mission and settlers until Colonel Cornelius Gilliam arrived with a larger force in February 1848, at which point Lee became third in command after Gilliam and Lieutenant-Colonel James Waters.

With a larger force, the militia forces pressed east towards the Whitman Mission, with Lee commanding some troops and carrying out reconnaissance. By March 4 the forces reached the mission after a battle at Sand Hollows. After reaching the mission, Gilliam set out for The Dalles with a small force to supply that settlement, before continuing to Oregon City to report to the governor when he was accidentally shot and killed. Lee continued west with Gilliam's body and was promoted to Colonel before returning to the front. Once at the front he discovered that the troops had elected Waters as Colonel, so Lee resigned as colonel and took the role as a subordinate to Waters.

== Later life ==
After leaving the war, Governor Abernethy appointed Lee as superintendent of Indian Affairs in 1848. In 1849, he sought his fortune in the gold mines of the California Gold Rush. He successfully mined there before returning to Oregon and setting up business in Oregon City in 1850. That year Lee traveled by ship to New York to acquire inventory for his store, but died of Panama fever on his return to Oregon in 1851.
