= Oregon Spectator =

Newspaper in Oregon City (1846–1855)

The Oregon Spectator
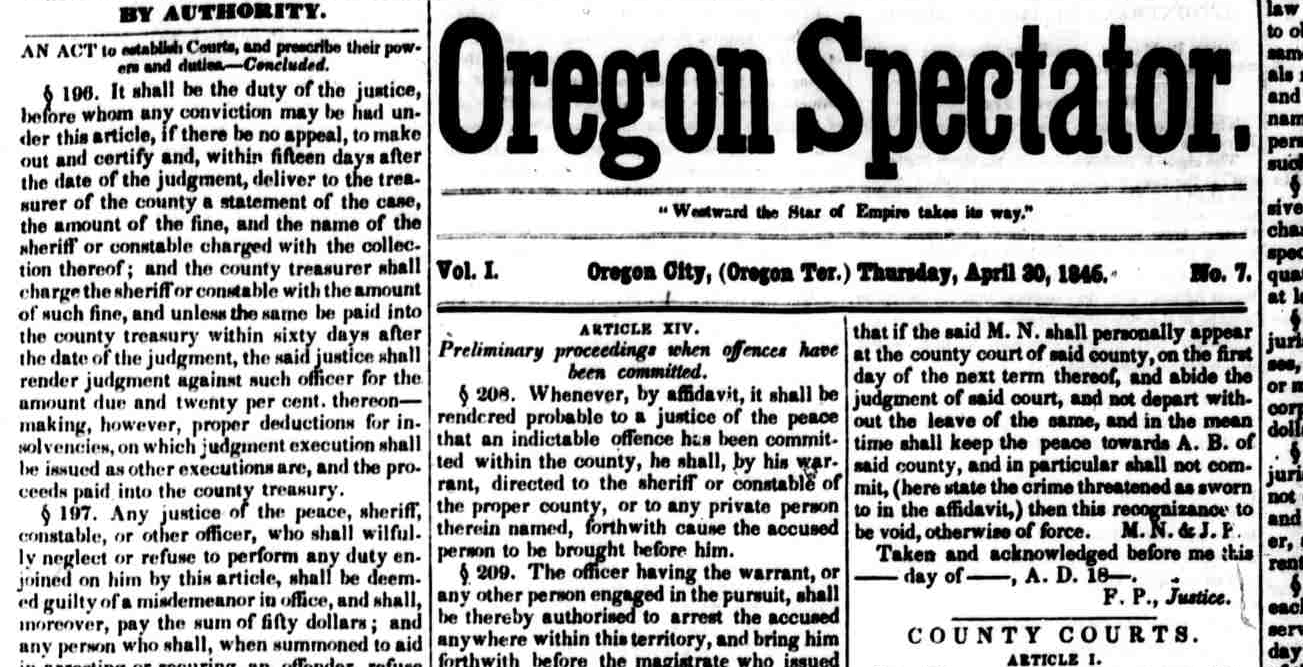
- The April 30, 1846 front page of The Oregon Spectator
- Type: Biweekly newspaper
- Format: Tabloid
- Owner(s): Oregon Printing Association
- Editor: William G. T'Vault and others
- Founded: 1846
- Ceased publication: 1855
- Headquarters: Oregon City, Oregon Territory, USA

The Oregon Spectator, was a newspaper published from 1846 to 1855 in Oregon City of what was first the Oregon Country and later the Oregon Territory of the United States. The Spectator was the first American newspaper west of the Rocky Mountains and was the main paper of the region used by politicians for public debate of the leading topics of the day. The paper's motto was Westward the Star of Empire takes its way.

== History ==
=== Antecedents ===
Although small publications were printed in California from 1834, there were no newspapers published in that territory until after American triumph in the Mexican–American War of 1846 — several months after establishment of the Oregon Spectator.

A printing press, brought to Oregon from the Sandwich Islands (Hawaii), had been in operation at the Waiilatpu Mission as early as 1839.

=== Establishment ===
The Oregon Printing Association (OPA) was formed in Oregon City with the purpose of establishing a newspaper. The OPA consisted of a group of seven, including William G. T'Vault, James W. Nesmith, John P. Brooks, George Abernethy, John H. Couch, Robert Newell, and John E. Long. It formally declared that the press they acquired was never to be used "...by any party for the purpose of propagating sectarian principles or doctrines; nor for the discussion of exclusive party politics." The group secured a press from New York.

The OPA produced the first issue of the Oregon Spectator on Thursday, February 5, 1846. The publication thereby became the first newspaper published on the Pacific coast of the United States.

T'Vault served as president and the first editor of the paper. Most of the owners of the paper had roots in the Methodist Mission which had dominated Oregon politics prior to the establishment of the Provisional Government in 1841. T'Vault was succeeded in a matter of months by Henry A. G. Lee, who was the Association's original choice, but had not been hired due to differences over his salary. Lee also remained for only a few months, and was succeeded for another two months by John Fleming, the paper's printer. George Law Curry, who succeeded them, lasted into 1848, when he resigned due to a dispute with the Association over his wish to adopt a "firm and consistent American tone." The United States formed the Oregon Territory in August 1848, with Oregon City—the home of the Spectator—serving as the seat of government for its first three years.

After Curry's departure, Aaron E. Wait of Massachusetts, became the editor. On February 10, 1848, Wait enlarged the paper to twenty-four columns.

The first edition was only four tabloid pages; their contents were described by Himes in 1902. It was printed on a hand press which was purchased in New York City and shipped by sailing vessel around Cape Horn. The paper was initially published semi-monthly, with pages of 11 by 15 inches (28 by 38 cm), arranged into four columns.

=== Development ===
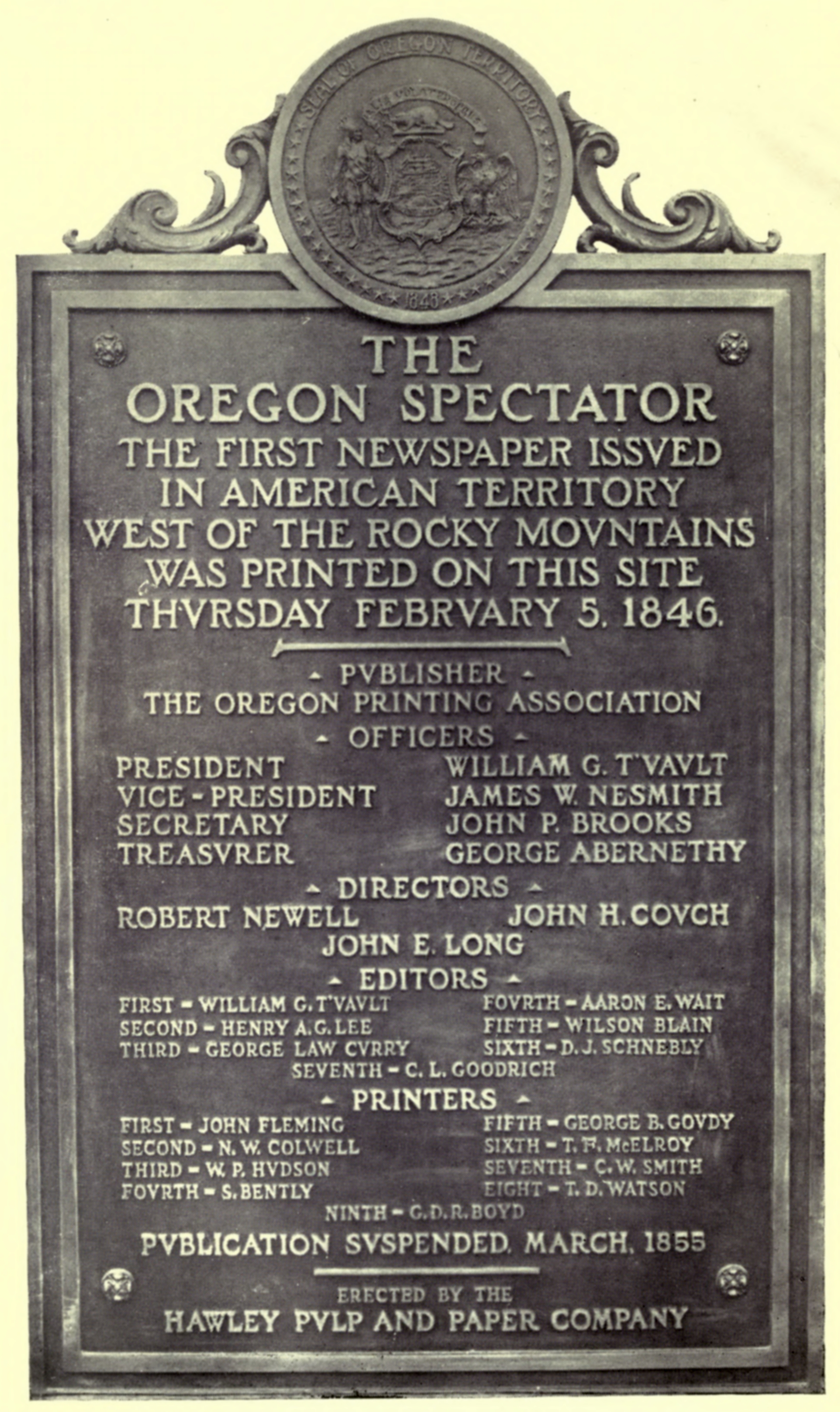
Tablet unveiled Aug 9, 1919 commemorating the Oregon Spectator.

For the first four years the owners did not allow sectarian political discussions in the paper. This lack of partisan politics from the Spectator's pages does not mean it did not have an overt political line, however, as throughout its existence the paper took a consistent stance agitating opposition to Hudson's Bay Company. In the view of pioneer Western American historian Hubert Howe Bancroft, the Spectator might reasonably be viewed as the organ of the American merchant class against its British competitors. During most of the provisional government period, it was the only newspaper published in Oregon. The paper also advocated in favor of the principles of morality, temperance, and education among the European-American immigrant population of the Oregon Territory.

Owing to transportation and communications difficulties, "current" national news in the Spectator was usually at least 6 months out of date, consisting of rewrites of material covered in newspapers brought into Oregon by annual migrations of settlers or by ship via the Hawaiian Islands.

After 5 issues T'Vault was dismissed as editor for his moderate temperament, to be replaced by Henry A. G. Lee. Lee lasted for 9 issues in the formal editor's role before he was himself replaced in favor of a period of collective editorship. Effective with issue 18 George Law Curry formally took over the editorial reins. He remained on the job until he was removed in 1849, to be replaced briefly by Aaron E. Waite, who was followed as editor by Wilson Blain.

In 1850 the Spectator and the press on which it was produced were sold to Robert Moore, who continued with Blain at the editorial desk. Blain was subsequently removed by D. J. Schnebley, who purchased the publication and edited it for a time in conjunction with C. P. Culver.

The Spectator was sold one final time, with C. L. Goodrich buying the paper in March 1854 and continuing it until its termination in March 1855.

=== Demise ===
Oregon City's position being eclipsed by that of nearby Portland as the center of commerce and Salem for politics, the paper's fortunes faltered, and publication ceased in 1855.

== Controversies ==
As the main newspaper in the region, the Spectator was often used to inform the populace of current topics, such as the debate over banning the manufacturing and sale of ardent spirits by law of the Provisional Legislature where Samuel Parker and James Douglas debated the proposed law. Parker accused Douglas and the Hudson's Bay Company (HBC) of selling rum at Fort Vancouver with Douglas asserting the sovereignty of the HBC over its own people, but pledging to enforce any laws of the Provisional Government against all other parties.

Under George Curry's editorship, the paper attacked Jesse Quinn Thornton when Thornton was sent to Washington, D.C. He had been sent as a representative of the government, but Curry accused Thornton of actually trying to secure favorable federal appointments for himself and his political allies.

== Legacy and archives ==
The Spectator was indexed by a project of the Works Progress Administration in 1941. The index is available in two volumes hosted by the Oregon State University library. Archives of the issues themselves are available in the University of Oregon Historic Oregon Newspapers archive.
