= Robert Newell (politician) =

American politician (1807–1869)

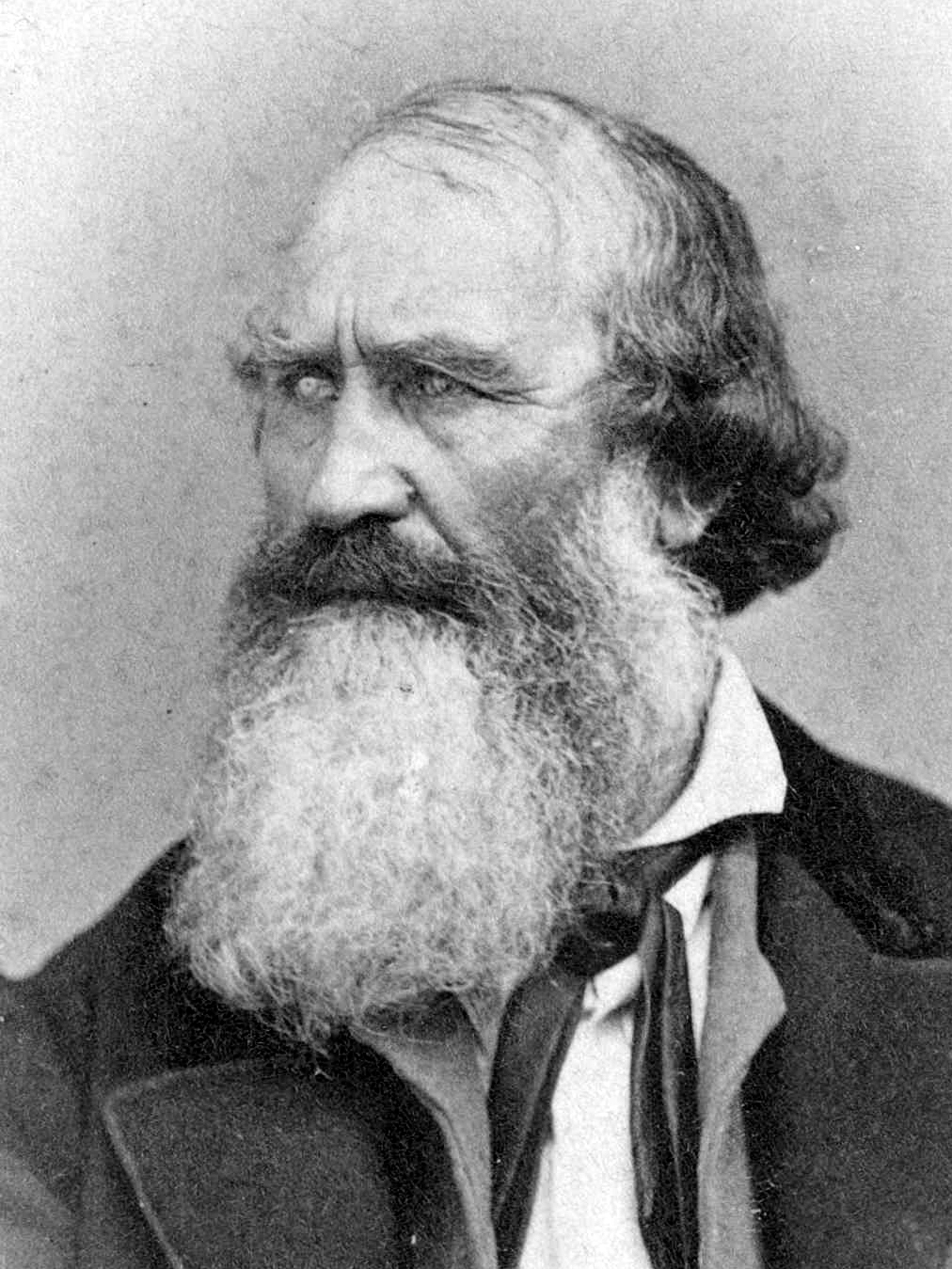

Speaker of the Provisional Legislature of Oregon
- In office December 2, 1845 – December 10, 1845
- Preceded by: Morton M. McCarver
- Succeeded by: Henry A. G. Lee
- In office December 7, 1847 – December 28, 1847
- Preceded by: Asa Lovejoy
- Succeeded by: Ralph Wilcox

Member of the Provisional Legislature of Oregon
- In office June 27, 1843 – December 28, 1847
- Constituency: Champoick District

Member of the Oregon House of Representatives
- In office September 10, 1860 – October 19, 1860
- Constituency: Marion County

Personal details
- Born: March 30, 1807 Zanesville, Ohio
- Died: November 24, 1869 (aged 62) Lapwai, Idaho
- Party: Democrat
- Spouse(s): Kitty Newell; Rebecca Newman; Mrs. Ward
- Relations: Joseph L. Meek
- Occupation: fur trader

Robert "Doc" Newell (March 30, 1807 – November 24, 1869) was an American politician and fur trapper in the Oregon Country. He was a frontier doctor in what would become the U.S. state of Oregon. A native of Ohio, he served in the Provisional Government of Oregon and later was a member of the Oregon State Legislature. The Newell House Museum, his reconstructed former home on the French Prairie in Champoeg, is listed on the National Register of Historic Places.

== Early life ==
Newell was born on March 30, 1807, in Zanesville, Ohio. In 1829, Newell joined William Sublette and his group on a party to trap beaver. Others in the group included Joseph L. Meek and Jedediah Smith. He trapped fur in the region west of the Rockies in the 1830s, and married Kitty, a Nez Perce woman in 1833. During his time as a mountain man, he became so skilled at basic surgery and healing, despite not having professional medical training, that he earned the nickname "Doctor" or "Doc" Newell that stayed with him the rest of his life.

In 1840, he moved permanently to Oregon Country with his brother-in-law Joseph Meek. They settled on the Tualatin Plains, arriving on December 25 on the plains with two head of cattle. This was the first time that a wagon completed the journey from Fort Hall to the Columbia River along the Oregon Trail. The following year, they brought the first wagon into the Willamette Valley.

== Oregon ==
In 1842, Newell helped to establish the Oregon Lyceum at Oregon City, Oregon. He would later become the director of the Oregon Printing Association that grew out of the Lyceum and started the first newspaper west of the Rocky Mountains, the Oregon Spectator. At the May 2, 1843, settler meeting Newell voted in favor of creating a provisional government in the region. The vote passed 52 to 50 and a Provisional Legislature was created. Newell served in that body from 1843 until it was replaced with the Oregon Territorial Legislature in 1849, although he resigned during the final session. During the 1847 meeting of the group, Newell served as Speaker of the body.

Newell's first wife died in 1845 and was buried at Champoeg. Her gravesite is accessible to visitors at the current Champoeg State Heritage Area. He remarried in 1846 to Rebecca Newman. After the Whitman Massacre and during the ensuing Cayuse War, he was appointed as a peace commissioner. In that role, on March 7, 1848, he negotiated to keep the Nez Perce tribe out of the war. Newell was then appointed as Indian agent for the tribes located south of the Columbia River in the Oregon Territory before moving to California to mine during the California Gold Rush in 1849. In 1850, he returned to Oregon where he platted the Champoeg townsite with Andre Longtain. From 1855 to 1856 he was the commander of a company of army scouts during the Rogue River Wars. In 1860, Newell was elected to the Oregon House of Representatives after Oregon achieved statehood in 1859. He served as a Democrat representing Marion County. Most of Champoeg was wiped away during an 1861 flood, although Newell's house, situated on high ground, was one of the few to survive. Newell almost bankrupted himself taking in victims of the flood.

== Later years ==
After the 1861 Willamette River flood, Newell moved to Lapwai, Idaho, where he worked as an interpreter and commissioner for the army outpost at that location from 1862 to 1868. His second wife died in May 1867, and he married a third and final time in 1869 to Mrs. Ward. In 1868, he went to Washington, D.C., along with several Indian chiefs, to attempt to amend some treaties between the United States and the Native American tribes. United States President Andrew Johnson then appointed him as an Indian agent that year. Robert Newell died on November 24, 1869, in Lapwai, Idaho, from a heart attack. He fathered five children by his first wife, and eleven by his second wife. After his death, several Native American tribes granted him 5 acres (20,000 m^{2}) of land in what is now Lewiston, with the deed dated June 9, 1871.

== Legacy ==
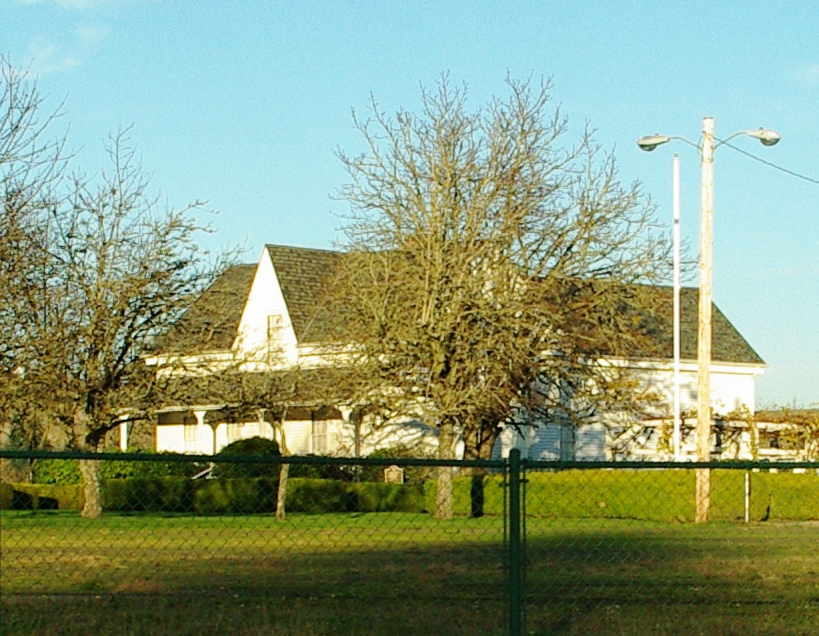
The Newell House in 2009

A replica of Robert Newell's 1852 Gothic Revival house is in Champoeg State Heritage Area. It is run as a house museum by the Oregon State Society of the Daughters of the American Revolution, who rebuilt the badly deteriorated house in time for the Oregon Centennial in 1959. The house retains some of the original architectural details, including some of the windows, doors, and door knobs.
