= Oregon Sentinel =

19th-century newspaper

- Type: Weekly newspaper
- Founder(s): William G. T'Vault
- Founded: 1855
- Language: English
- Ceased publication: 1888
- City: Jacksonville, Oregon
- OCLC number: 10523005

The Oregon Sentinel was the first newspaper in southern Oregon. It was published in Jacksonville, Oregon from 1855 to 1888.

== History ==
The Oregon Sentinel was founded by pioneer William G. T'Vault, and was initially named the Table Rock Sentinel, changing its title in 1858. It was a decidedly pro-slavery newspaper, despite the practice being illegal in Oregon. In the 1980s, the Southern Oregon Historical Society revived the title once again as its own newsletter.

== Jacksonville Sentinel ==
The Jacksonville Sentinel, a distinct newspaper, was founded in 1902 and lasted until 1906. It was the only Republican paper in southern Oregon at the time. The Jacksonville Sentinel was edited by Joseph P. Gaston, an American railroad executive and journalist.
