= Morton M. McCarver =

American pioneer

Morton Matthew McCarver
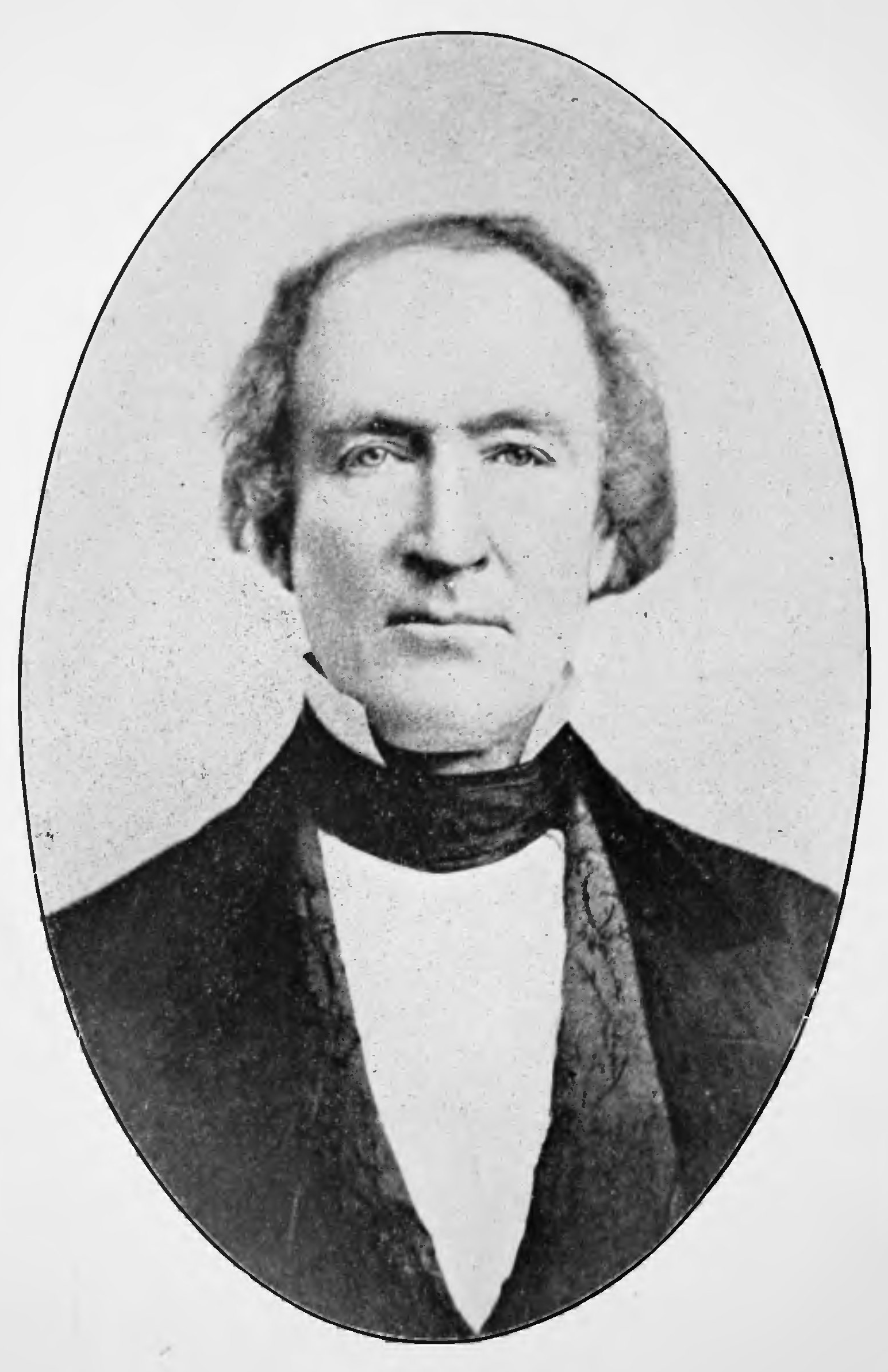

Speaker of the Provisional Legislature of Oregon
- In office June 18, 1844 – August 20, 1845
- Preceded by: Position created
- Succeeded by: Robert Newell
- Constituency: Tuality District

Personal details
- Born: January 14, 1807 Lexington, Kentucky
- Died: April 17, 1875 (aged 68) Tacoma, Washington
- Resting place: Tacoma Cemetery
- Party: Democrat
- Spouse(s): Mary Ann Jennings; Julia Backalow
- Occupation: Politician

"General" Morton Matthew McCarver (January 14, 1807 – April 17, 1875) was an American politician. He was a pioneer in the West. A native of Kentucky, he helped found cities in Iowa, Oregon, and Washington while also involved in the early government of California. He served in the Provisional Legislature of Oregon, including as the first speaker of that body, and also fought in the Rogue River Wars.

== Early years ==
Morton Matthew McCarver was born on January 14, 1807, to Joseph and Betsy McCarver (née Morton) in Lexington, Kentucky. His father died during Morton's youth, and the younger McCarver left home at the age of 14. McCarver headed south and spent a few years in Texas and Louisiana before returning to Kentucky. He moved to Illinois in 1829 where he married Marry Ann Jennings on May 6, 1830, at Monmouth, Illinois, and the couple had two children before she died in 1846. In 1832, he fought with the Illinois militia in the Black Hawk War.

After moving to what would become Iowa, he helped found Burlington, Iowa in 1833 and 1834. He had established a ferry across the Mississippi River in 1833, but his settlement was twice burned out as a trespasser on land then owned by Native Americans. Once the Black Hawk Purchase was complete in June 1833 he rebuilt his cabin in what was then the Iowa Territory. While in Iowa he served as commissary general of Iowa, earning him the nickname of general. In 1843, he joined the Great Migration and traveled the Oregon Trail west to the Oregon Country, arriving at the Willamette Valley in November of that year.

== In the West ==
Once in Oregon, McCarver settled along the Columbia River in what is now Portland, Oregon. He made a land claim and founded Linnton in 1843, which is now part of Portland. On June 18, 1844, he was selected as the speaker of the Legislative Committee, the forerunner to the Oregon House of Representatives. In 1845, he was again elected to the Provisional Legislature of Oregon from Tuality District and was selected as the speaker of the then renamed House of Representatives, the first to hold that position. The next year he started an orchard near Oregon City after buying the land claim next to that city. In 1848, he married Julia Backalow, and they had five children; Thomas J., Jennie, Mary A., Naomi, Julia, Elizabeth, and Dollie.

McCarver left Oregon for the California Gold Rush in August 1848, but left his family in Oregon City to hold the land claim. In 1849, he claims to have helped to found Sacramento, where he constructed housing to rent out. McCarver was then elected to the legislature designed to govern the city on April 30, 1849. He was also elected to serve at the Constitutional Convention of 1849 that was held in Monterey, as one of eight people representing the Sacramento district.

Also in 1849, along with some others, he purchased three passenger ships, including the Ocean Bird. The Ocean Bird was then put into service between San Francisco Bay and Milwaukie, Oregon. Due to flooding and fires, McCarver decided to return to Oregon aboard the Ocean Bird, bringing with him a house that had been cut in Boston.

This Aladdin House was then constructed in 1849 on his farm near Oregon City. His farm became known as the Locust Farm. During the Rogue River Wars of 1855 to 1856 McCarver served as commissary general and set up his base at Roseburg in Southern Oregon. McCarver also participated in a gold rush in Idaho in 1862, setting up a company in what became Idaho City.

In March 1868, McCarver then moved north and helped found Tacoma, Washington. He first went to Olympia, capital of the then Washington Territory, and procured a map to study the area and consider the most likely terminus of the then planned transcontinental railroad. On April 1, 1868, McCarver arrived at Commencement Bay, a likely railroad terminus on Puget Sound due to its proximity to Snoqualmie Pass, and then purchased the land of Job Carr. He continued buying up available land along Commencement Bay in anticipation of the railroad. McCarver also convinced Hanson, Ackerson & Company to build a sawmill in the area while he platted a town site and sold-off lots. McCarver wanted to call the city Commencement City, but after a suggestion by Philip Ritz of the Northern Pacific Railroad, McCarver changed his mind. Anthony Carr, Job's son, had already filed a plat for "Tacoma" on November 30, 1869. McCarver chose to call his neighboring plat "Tacoma City" when he filed his plat map on December 3, 1869. The word "Tacoma" may be the purported Native American name for nearby Mount Rainier. Alternatively, it may have been used by Native Americans in the Puget Sound region to describe all snow-topped peaks in the region, and was not specific to Mount Rainier.

Tacoma City was officially recognized by Pierce County on May 21, 1874, and incorporated by the territorial legislature on November 12, 1875.

== Death and legacy ==
Morton Matthew McCarver died on April 17, 1875, at the age of 68. He was buried at Tacoma Cemetery, the first adult buried at that cemetery. McCarver had also selected that site for a cemetery not long before he died. In November 1926, a Tacoma school was named in his honor. His former home in Oregon City was added to the National Register of Historic Places in 1974, and a Liberty Ship built during World War II was also named in his honor.

In 1877, McCarver's daughter Virginia married the newspaper proprietor and historian Thomas W. Prosch, who later wrote a biography, McCarver and Tacoma (1906).

In 1926, a school in the McCarver Neighborhood, Tacoma, Washington was named for him. In 2023, community members raised concerns about McCarver's history of proposing and supporting laws to exclude Black and mixed-race Americans from living in the Oregon and California territories. In August 2023, the Tacoma Public Schools district renamed McCarver Elementary to Edna Travis Elementary School.
