= Provisional Legislature of Oregon =

Early Oregon legislature

- Provisional Government of Oregon
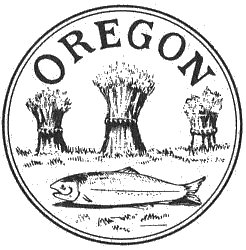
- Provisional Government's Salmon Seal

Type
- Type: Unicameral
- Houses: Legislative Committee (1843–1844); House of Representatives (1845–1849)

History
- Established: 1843
- Disbanded: 1849
- Preceded by: Champoeg Meetings
- Succeeded by: Oregon Territorial Legislature
- Seats: 9 (1843–1844); 13 (1845); 17 (1846); 19 (1847–1849)

Meeting place
- Oregon City

The Provisional Legislature of Oregon was the single-chamber legislative body of the Provisional Government of Oregon. It served the Oregon Country of the Pacific Northwest of North America from 1843 until early 1849 at a time when no country had sovereignty over the region. This democratically elected legislature became the Oregon Territorial Legislature when the territorial authorities arrived after the creation of the Oregon Territory by the United States in 1848. The body was first termed the Legislative Committee and later renamed the House of Representatives. Over the course of its six-year history the legislature passed laws, including taxation and liquor regulation, and created an army to deal with conflicts with Native Americans.

Many of the legislators would become prominent figures during the territorial years of Oregon. At first the body was a small committee of nine people, but the group was altered when the Organic Laws of Oregon were revised in 1845 with the legislative branch of the Provisional Government becoming the Oregon House of Representatives with a minimum of 13 members. Once the government was dissolved in 1849, all the laws remained in effect, except for the one that authorized the minting of coins. Territorial Governor Joseph Lane nullified that law, because it was in conflict with Article I, Section 8 of the United States Constitution, giving Congress the sole right to coin money, thus ending production of the Beaver Coins.

== Background ==
On May 2, 1843, by a vote of 52 to 50, the European American settlers of the Oregon Country (mainly those from the Willamette Valley), created a provisional government at Champoeg. In May and June, a nine-person committee met in Oregon City and drafted the Organic Laws of Oregon as a pseudo-constitution that was subsequently ratified on July 5, 1843. This document created the government and authorized a provisional legislature of nine people.

== 1843 ==
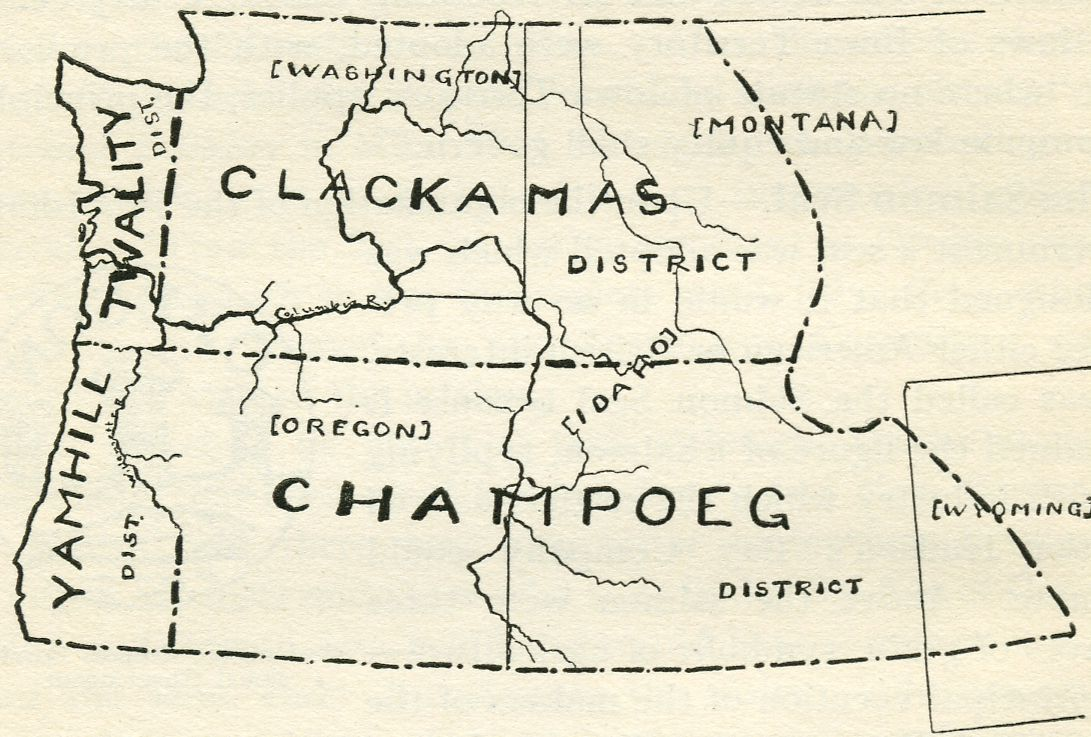
Original districts of the government with the eventual U.S. borders and states

On May 16, the nine-person committee of James A. O'Neil, Robert Moore, William H. Gray, William P. Dougherty, David Hill, Robert Shortess, Thomas J. Hubbard, Robert Newell, and Alanson Beers met for three days to draft laws. The group met again for two days starting on June 16, with George LeBreton serving as the recorder and Moore as the chairman for both sets of meetings. The laws drafted became the Organic Laws of Oregon and were ratified on July 5. Committees on land claims, appropriations, military, the judiciary, and districting were also formed at that meeting.

The organic laws were based on the laws of Iowa Territory. The document outlined the legislative branch and its powers, vested in a unicameral or single body. At that time the title of the legislature was the Legislative Committee and it consisted of nine elected representatives apportioned by population to the four established districts (which later became counties). The Organic Laws required the legislature to meet in June and December of each year.

== 1844 ==
The first meeting of the 1844 legislature took place June 18 at the home of Felix Hathaway in Oregon City. This session lasted until June 27, and another session was held from December 16 to 21 at the residence of John E. Long, also in Oregon City. At the December meeting, Executive Committee members Peter G. Stewart and Osborne Russell presented a message to the group regarding the opposing claims of the United States and Great Britain.

Among the laws passed during the 1844 session was the "Lash Law", which banned Blacks from living in the territory with violators subject to 20–39 lashes across the back every six months, until the person left the region.

=== Members ===
Members of the legislature and the districts they represented (McCarver served as the speaker of the body with John E. Long as the recorder):

- Thomas D. Keizur, Champoeg
- Robert Newell, Champoeg
- Daniel Waldo, Champoeg
- Asa L. Lovejoy, Clackamas
- Peter H. Burnett, Tuality
- Samuel M. Gilmore, Tuality
- David Hill, Tuality
- Morton M. McCarver, Tuality

== 1845 ==
The 1845 legislature met three different times, under two different structures. First, from June 24 to July 5, 1845, the legislature met in Oregon City, first at the home of John E. Long and then the home of Theophilus R. Magruder, with Morton M. McCarver serving as the speaker of the group. After this, the Organic Laws were replaced with the Organic Act of 1845, which altered the legislature in several ways. First the number of representatives was increased to include a minimum of 13 and a maximum of 61. Second, the name was changed to the House of Representatives. All members of the body were to be elected by popular vote with vacancies filled using special elections. The body also received new powers to impeach any civil official by a 3/4ths vote, apportion the legislators among the districts, create post offices, levy taxes, declare war, organize and call out the militia, create lower courts, pass laws concerning the general welfare of the region, regulate trade with the Native Americans, regulate liquor sale and manufacture, and regulate the police power of the government, among other powers. Meetings continued to be in June and December.

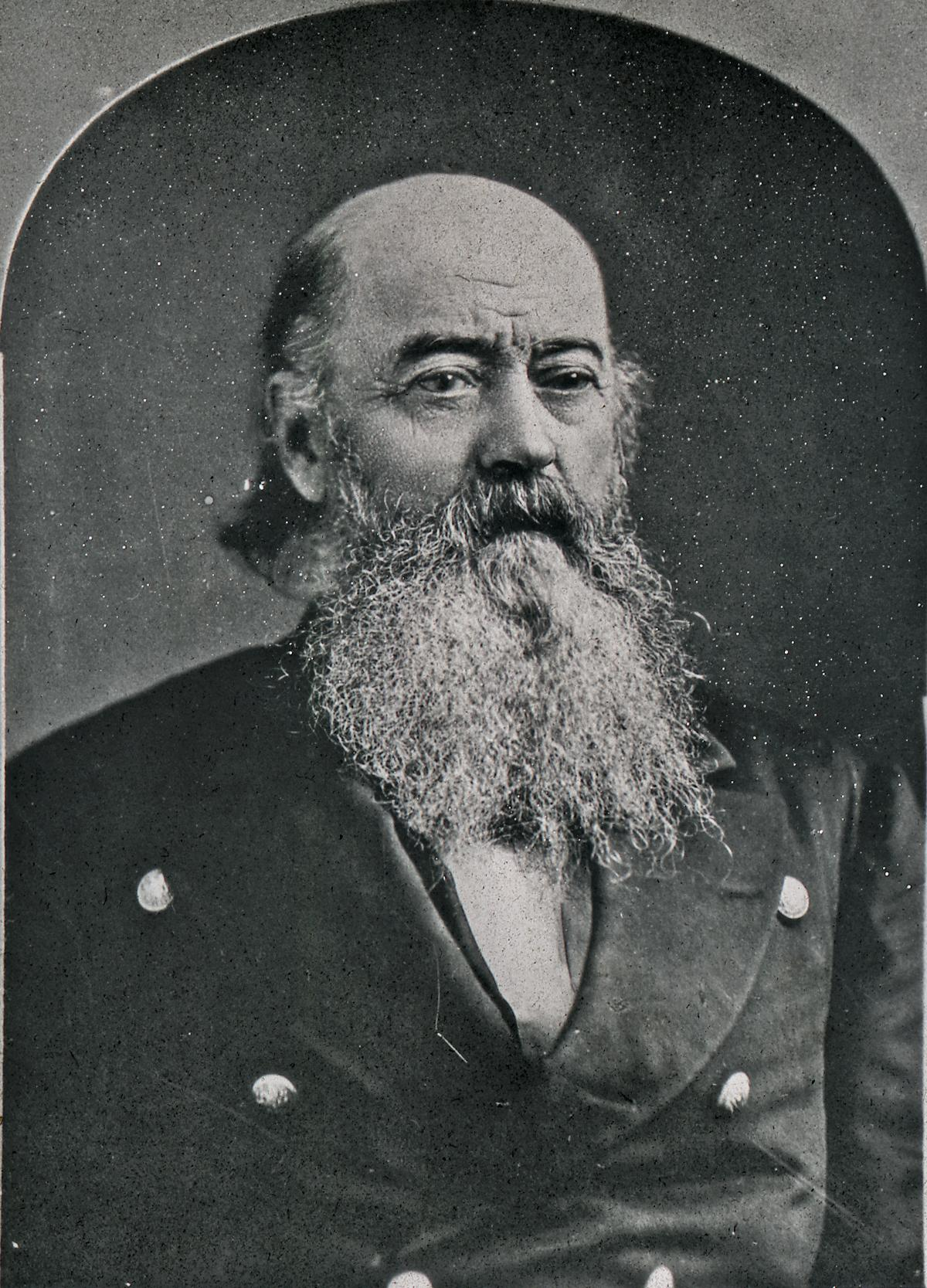
Legislator Joseph Meek

With these changes, a special session of the legislature met August 5 until August 20 in Oregon City. On August 11, 1845 at the introduction of Jesse Applegate the body passed a law against dueling within a half hour that Governor Abernethy also signed within 30 minutes of the bill's introduction. A new legislature met beginning on December 2, with Robert Newell serving as the speaker of the body through December 10 and Henry A. G. Lee assuming the post until the conclusion of the session on December 19. Polk District was created during the session, with the bill passed on December 19. John E. Long served as the recorder and Theophilus R. Magruder as the sergeant at arms for the group. The same people who served in the summer session also served in the December session.

These sessions of the legislature designated Oregon City as the official capital and introduced income and property taxes that replaced an 1843 subscription program used to finance the government's activities. Other business included a ban on hard liquor, the incorporation of Oregon City, approval for the Barlow Road around Mount Hood, incorporation of the Multnomah Circulating Library, and incorporation of the Oregon Institute. At the meetings John E. Long served as the recorder, Frederick Prigg as the clerk, a Mr. Shaw as the sergeant at arms, and two people as chaplains.

=== Members ===
Members of the legislature and the districts they represented:

- Medard Godard Foisy, Champoeg
- Joseph M. Garrison, Champoeg
- Barton Lee, Champoeg
- Robert Newell, Champoeg
- William H. Gray, Clackamas
- Henry A. G. Lee, Clackamas
- Hiram Straight, Clackamas
- John McClure, Clatsop
- David Hill, Tuality
- Morton M. McCarver, Tuality
- Isaac W. Smith, Tuality
- Jesse Applegate, Yamhill
- Abijah Hendricks, Yamhill

== 1846 ==
After hearing the news that the United States had informed Britain it would be ending its obligations under the Treaty of 1818 and looking for a division of the Oregon Country, the legislature scaled back its agenda. One piece of legislation passed was a pilotage law that set standards and licensed boat pilots at the mouth of the Columbia River. The 1846 legislature met in the home of Henry Montgomery Knighton in Oregon City from December 1 through 19, with Asa Lovejoy serving as the speaker and leader. Noah Huber served as a clerk and Knighton as sergeant at arms.

=== Members ===
Members of the legislature and the districts they represented:

- Aaron Chamberlain, Champoeg
- Jesse Looney, Champoeg
- Angus McDonald, Champoeg
- Robert Newell, Champoeg
- Asa L. Lovejoy, Clackamas
- Hiram Straight, Clackamas
- William G. T'Vault, Clackamas
- George Summers, Clatsop
- William F. Tolmie, Lewis
- John D. Boon, Polk
- James E. Williams, Polk
- Lawrence Hall, Tuality
- Daniel H. Lownsdale, Tuality
- Joseph L. Meek, Tuality
- Henry N. Peers, Vancouver
- Absalom J. Hembree, Yamhill
- Thomas Jeffreys, Yamhill

== 1847 ==
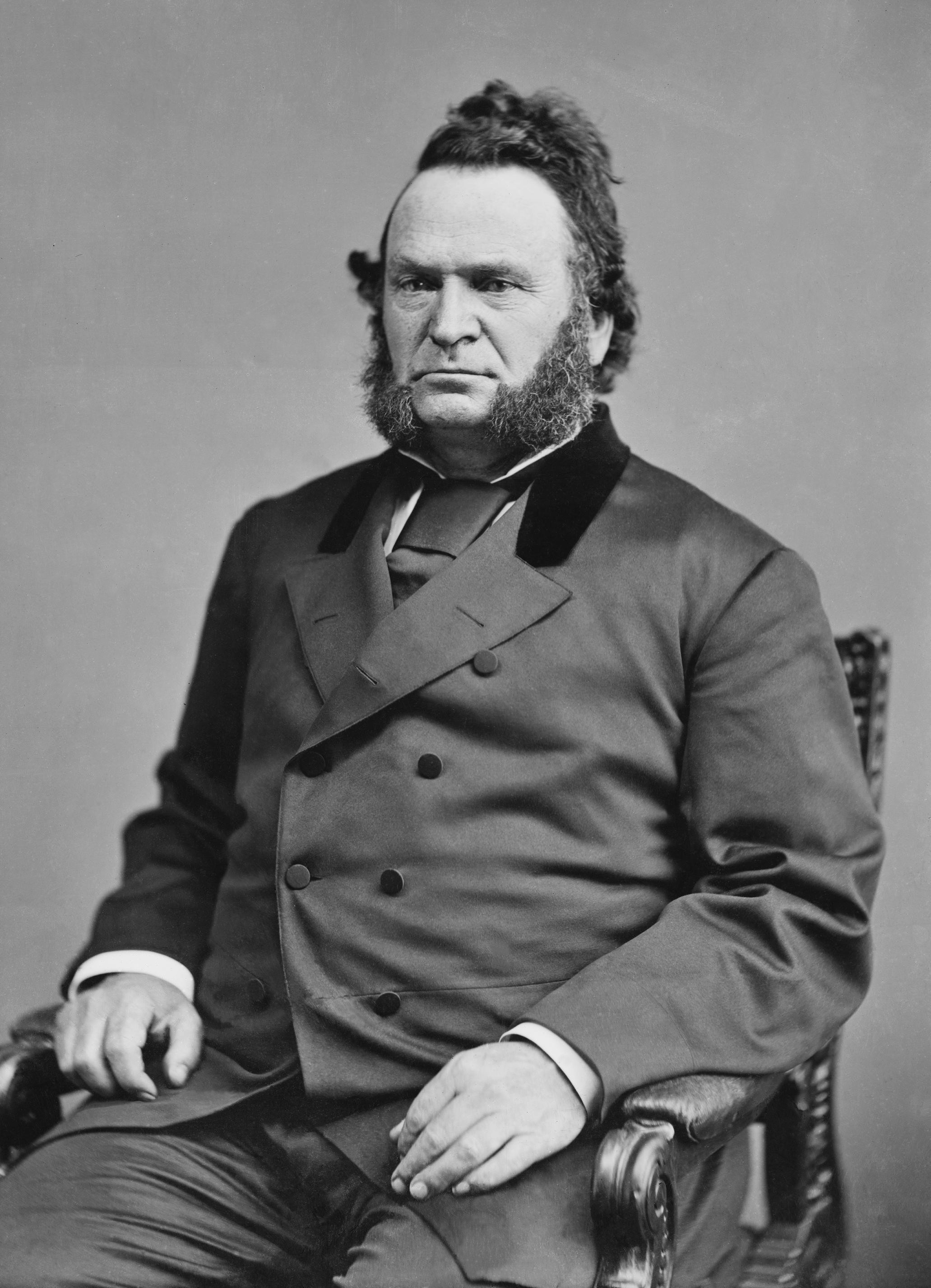
Nesmith

In 1847 the legislature met from December 7 to 28 at the Methodist Church in Oregon City. On the second day of this meeting at Main and Seventh streets, news of the Whitman massacre, which occurred on November 29, 1847, was delivered to the legislature by Governor Abernethy. This event would dominate the remainder of the session as the Provisional Government worked with the Hudson's Bay Company to send an army east to Walla Walla. Forty-two men under the command of Henry A. G. Lee were sent immediately to The Dalles in what was the beginning of the Cayuse War. A large force under the command of Cornelius Gilliam was then organized and sent to punish those responsible for the massacre. On December 23, the group created Benton District out of the southern section of Polk District, naming the new district for Missouri Senator Thomas Hart Benton. In the legislature, Robert Newell was chosen as the speaker of the group with Calvin W. Cook as clerk.

=== Members ===
Members of the legislature and the districts they represented:

- Aaron Chamberlain, Champoeg
- Anderson Cox, Champoeg
- Robert Newell, Champoeg
- William H. Rector, Champoeg
- Willard Hall Rees, Champoeg
- Medorem Crawford, Clackamas
- Jacob M. Wair, Clackamas
- Samuel Simpson White, Clackamas
- John Robinson, Clatsop
- Simon Plamondon, Lewis
- Marcus Aurelius Ford, Polk
- James W. Nesmith, Polk
- David Hill, Tuality
- Joseph L. Meek, Tuality
- Ralph Wilcox, Tuality
- Henry W. Peers, Vancouver
- Absalom J. Hembree, Yamhill
- Levi A. Rice, Yamhill
- Lewis Franklin Rogers, Yamhill

== Final sessions ==
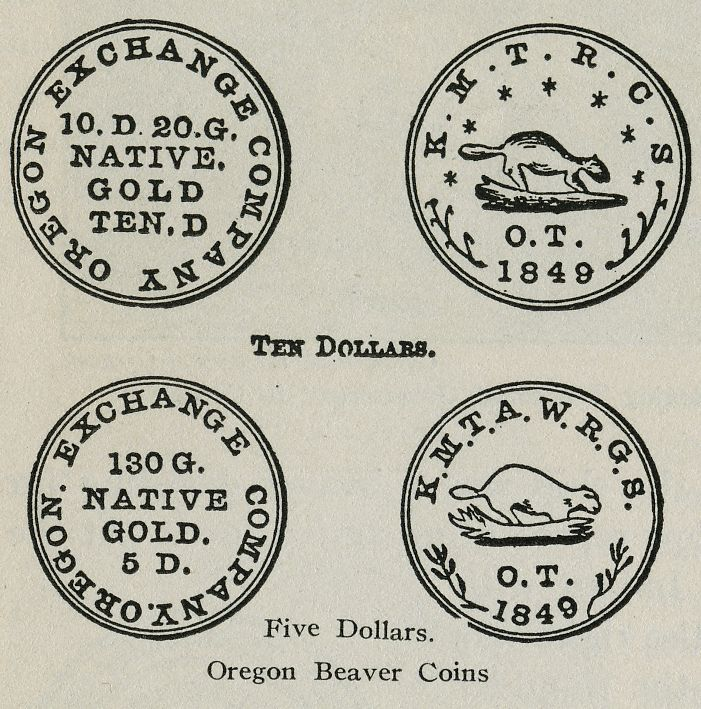
The Beaver Coins.

The Provisional Legislature met for two sessions in late 1848 and early 1849. The first session, from December 5 to December 13, never formally organized as so many of the representatives had traveled south for the California Gold Rush. Beginning on February 5, a session was organized that conducted the final business of the Provisional Government. The session lasted until February 16. During this session a law forbidding the sale of firearms and supplies to Native Americans was repealed, and a law was passed to authorize the minting of gold coins. The law concerning the coins allowed for the creation of the Beaver Coins, which had a higher gold content than United States minted coins. Less than a month later, when the new territorial governor Joseph Lane arrived, however, he rescinded the law as unconstitutional and the coins were collected and removed from circulation. For the legislative session Ralph Wilcox was chosen as speaker, but he resigned from the post. Stephen Meek served as the doorkeeper, William G. T’Vault as a clerk, and William Holmes as sergeant at arms.

=== Members ===
Members of the legislature and the districts they represented:

- Joseph C. Avery, Benton
- William J. Bailey, Champoeg
- Albert Gaines (disqualified), Champoeg
- Robert Newell (resigned), Champoeg
- Samuel Parker, Champoeg
- William Porter, Champoeg
- Medorem Crawford, Clackamas
- George L. Curry, Clackamas
- Absalom F. Hedges, Clackamas
- John L. Snook (resigned), Clackamas
- John Hudson, Clatsop
- Levi L. Smith, Lewis
- Anderson Cox, Linn
- Henry J. Peterson, Linn
- Jesse Applegate, Polk
- James W. Nesmith (resigned), Polk
- Osborne Russell (resigned), Polk
- Peter Hardeman Burnett (resigned), Tuality
- David Hill, Tuality
- Ralph Wilcox, Tuality
- Samuel Thurston, Tuality
- Adolphus L. Lewis, Vancouver
- Asa L. Lovejoy (resigned), Vancouver
- Absalom J. Hembree, Yamhill
- William J. Martin, Yamhill
- Levi A. Rice, Yamhill

== Oregon Territory ==
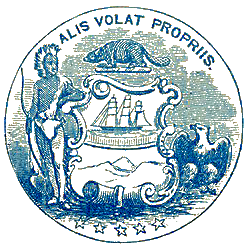
Seal of the Oregon Territory.

On June 15, 1846, the Oregon Treaty was signed with Great Britain, which settled the dispute over sovereignty of the Oregon Country. On August 13, 1848, the United States Congress created the Oregon Territory out of the land between California and the 49th parallel (this served as the border with Britain's North American colonies) and west of the Rocky Mountains. A new bicameral territorial legislature was created with an upper chamber Council and lower chamber House. These bodies met for the first time on July 16, 1849, with some members of the provisional legislature continuing into the new government, including David Hill, Asa Lovejoy, Samuel Parker, and Absalom J. Hembree. Upon statehood in 1859, the territorial legislature would be transformed into the Oregon Legislative Assembly.
