= Cornelius Gilliam =

American politician (1610–1680)

Missouri State Senator
- In office 1838–1842
- Constituency: District 12

Missouri State Senator
- In office 1842–1844
- Constituency: District 10

Personal details
- Born: April 13, 1798 Buncombe County, North Carolina, US
- Died: March 24, 1848 (aged 49) Oregon Territory
- Spouse: Mary Crawford

Military service
- Allegiance: United States; Provisional Government of Oregon
- Branch/service: Army
- Years of service: 1832–1838, 1847–1848
- Rank: Colonel
- Battles/wars: Black Hawk War; Seminole Wars; Cayuse War

Cornelius Gilliam (April 13, 1798 – March 24, 1848) was a pioneer of the U.S. state of Oregon who was best known as the commander of the volunteer forces against the Cayuse in the Cayuse War. A native of North Carolina, he served in the Black Hawk War and Seminole Wars before settling in Missouri. There he served in the militia against the Mormons, was a county sheriff, and a member of the Missouri State Senate before immigrating to the Oregon Country.

== Early life ==
Cornelius Gilliam was born in North Carolina on April 13, 1798. According to one of Gilliam's daughters, Martha Collins, he began working as a slave catcher while in his teens. Collins said that her father was highly successful at forcing slaves back into captivity and was elected sheriff on the strength of this reputation.

In North Carolina he married Mary Crawford in 1820, and they had eight children, six of those daughters. He fought against the Native Americans in 1832 during the Black Hawk War in the Midwest, and in 1837 in the Seminole Wars in Florida. During the Seminole War he served as a captain. Following the war he settled in Missouri where he continued his military service as a captain in the state militia during the battles with the Mormons in 1838. That year he was elected to the Missouri Senate to represent District 12, and was re-elected in 1842 to represent District 10. In Missouri, Gilliam was also the sheriff of Clay County.

== Oregon ==
In 1844, he headed west over the Oregon Trail to the unorganized Oregon Country. Gilliam was in charge of the wagon train at the beginning of the journey, though the wagon train later split into smaller groups. After the Whitman massacre in 1847, the Provisional Government of Oregon organized a force of about 600 and made Gilliam colonel to prosecute the Cayuse. In 1848, he led his forces east to engage the Native Americans, arriving at The Dalles in February. His forces pressed on to the Whitman Mission, arriving in March.

== Death and legacy ==
Gilliam then headed back to The Dalles to resupply that settlement and then on to Oregon City to report to Governor George Abernethy when he was accidentally shot and killed in what is now Morrow County on March 24, 1848. His body was returned to Oregon City by Henry A. G. Lee and he was buried in Polk County at the Dallas Cemetery. Gilliam County, Oregon is named for him. The ship Cornelius Gilliam was also named for him; it was used in World War II in the U.S. Merchant Service.

== See also ==
- Oregon Rifles
