= William G. T'Vault =

American politician

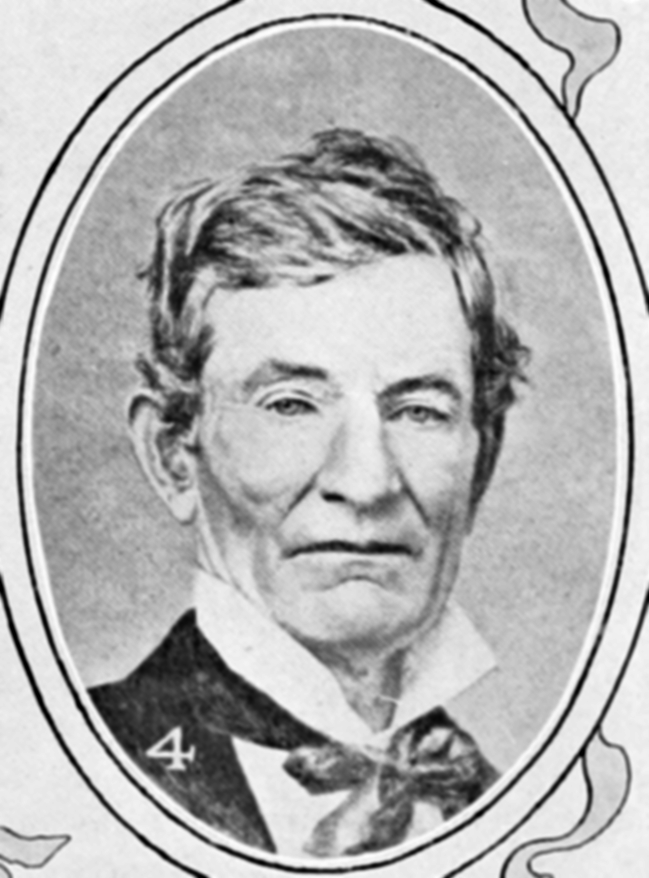

1st Speaker of the Oregon House of Representatives
- In office 1858–59
- Preceded by: Position established Nathaniel H. Gates as Speaker of the Oregon Territory House of Representatives
- Succeeded by: Benjamin F. Harding

Personal details
- Born: March 26, 1806 Tennessee
- Died: February 4, 1869 (aged 62) Oregon
- Party: Democratic Party
- Spouse: Rhoda Burns
- Profession: Publisher

William Green T'Vault (1806–1869) was a pioneer of the Oregon Country and the first editor of the first newspaper published in what is now the United States west of the Missouri River. T'Vault led a wagon train of 300 that arrived in Oregon in 1845, after traveling on the Meek Cutoff, a branch of the Oregon Trail. He settled in Oregon City, and was appointed Postmaster General by the Provisional Government of Oregon.

T'Vault became president of the Oregon Printing Association, which was an outgrowth of the Oregon Lyceum, and published the first issue of the Oregon Spectator on February 5, 1846. He was fired from the Spectator after 13 issues. T'Vault claimed it was because of differences with other association members, especially George Abernethy, though the association claimed it because of T'Vault's poor spelling.

T'Vault was a pro-slavery Democrat who became a member of the Provisional Legislature of Oregon in 1846. The same year he was part of a group that urged the United States Congress to disallow the land claims of earlier White residents of the region, including that of John McLoughlin at Willamette Falls. The petition was partially successful and McLoughlin's claim was not recognized.

In 1851, T'Vault led an exploring party of ten people from Port Orford in order to seek an overland route to the interior of the region. The party was ambushed by Native Americans and five members were killed, but T'Vault survived. He moved to southern Oregon and established the Table Rock Sentinel newspaper in 1855, and later the Oregon Sentinel in 1858. T'Vault represented Jackson County in the Oregon Territorial Legislature in 1858, its final year, and served as speaker of the Oregon House of Representatives during its first session, in 1858–59. He advocated for the formation of an independent Pacific Republic and also practiced law in Jacksonville.

== Links ==
- http://gesswhoto.com/ohs-blue-bucket.html
- http://www.all-oregon.com/king/part%203.htm
- Brier, Warren J. (August 1962). "Political Censorship in the Oregon Spectator". Pacific Historical Review. 31 (3). University of California Press: 235–240. doi:10.2307/3637167. JSTOR 3637167.
