= Cayuse War =

Conflict between the US government and Cayuse Native Americans (1847–1855)

- Part of the American Indian Wars
| Date | November 29, 1847 – June 9, 1855 |
| Location | Oregon Country and Oregon Territory |
| Result | United States victory |

Belligerents
| United States | Cayuse |

Commanders and leaders
| Cornelius Gilliam; Henry A. G. Lee; James Waters | Chief Five Crows; War Eagle |

Strength
| 500 militia | |

The Cayuse War (1847–1855) was an armed conflict between the Cayuse people of the Northwestern United States and settlers, backed by the U.S. government. The conflict was triggered by the Whitman massacre of 1847, where the Cayuse attacked a missionary outpost in response to a deadly measles epidemic that they believed was caused by Marcus Whitman. Over the next few years, the Provisional Government of Oregon and later the United States Army battled the Native Americans east of the Cascades. This was the first of several wars between the Native Americans and American settlers in that region that would lead to the negotiations between the United States and Native Americans of the Columbia Plateau, creating several Indian reservations.

== Causes ==
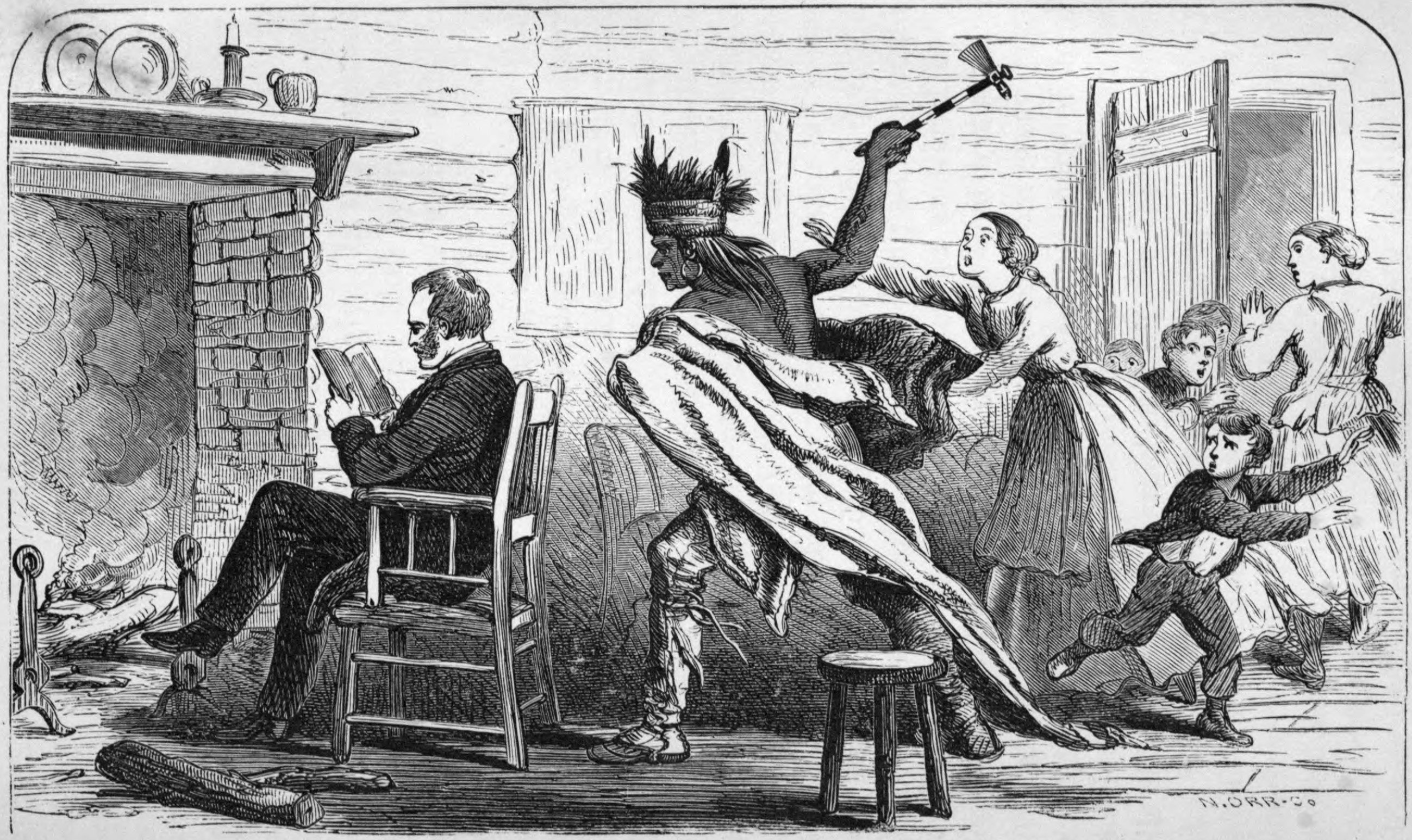
Dramatic depiction of the incident, from Eleven years in the Rocky Mountains and a life on the frontier by Frances Fuller Victor.

In 1836, two missionaries—Marcus and Narcissa Whitman—founded the Whitman Mission among the Cayuse Native Americans at Waiilatpu, six miles west of present-day Walla Walla, Washington. In addition to evangelizing, the missionaries established schools and grist mills and introduced crop irrigation. Despite initial successes, the Whitmans did not have any Cayuse baptized into their church. Due to lack of success and high costs, in 1842, the American Board of Commissioners for Foreign Missions was going to close the mission until Marcus Whitman returned east pleading to keep the mission open. Returning the following year, he joined approximately a thousand settlers traveling to Oregon Country.

The sudden influx of American settlers led to an escalation of tension between natives and settlers, which owed much to cultural misunderstandings and mutual hostilities. For instance, the Cayuse believed that to plow the ground was to desecrate the spirit of the Earth. The settlers, as agriculturalists, naturally did not accept this. The Cayuse expected payment from wagon trains passing through their territory and eating the wild food on which the tribes depended; the settlers did not understand this and instead drove away the men sent to exact payment, in the belief that they were merely "beggars".

The new settlers brought diseases with them. In 1847, an epidemic of measles killed half the Cayuse. The Cayuse suspected that Marcus Whitman—a practicing physician and religious leader, hence a shaman—was responsible for the deaths of their families, causing the disaster to make way for new immigrants. Seeking revenge, Cayuse tribesmen attacked the mission on November 29, 1847. Thirteen settlers were killed, including both of the Whitmans. All of the buildings at Waiilatpu were destroyed. The site is now a National Historic Site. For several weeks, 53 women and children were held captive before eventually being released. This event, which became known as the Whitman massacre, precipitated the Cayuse War.

== Ensuing violence ==
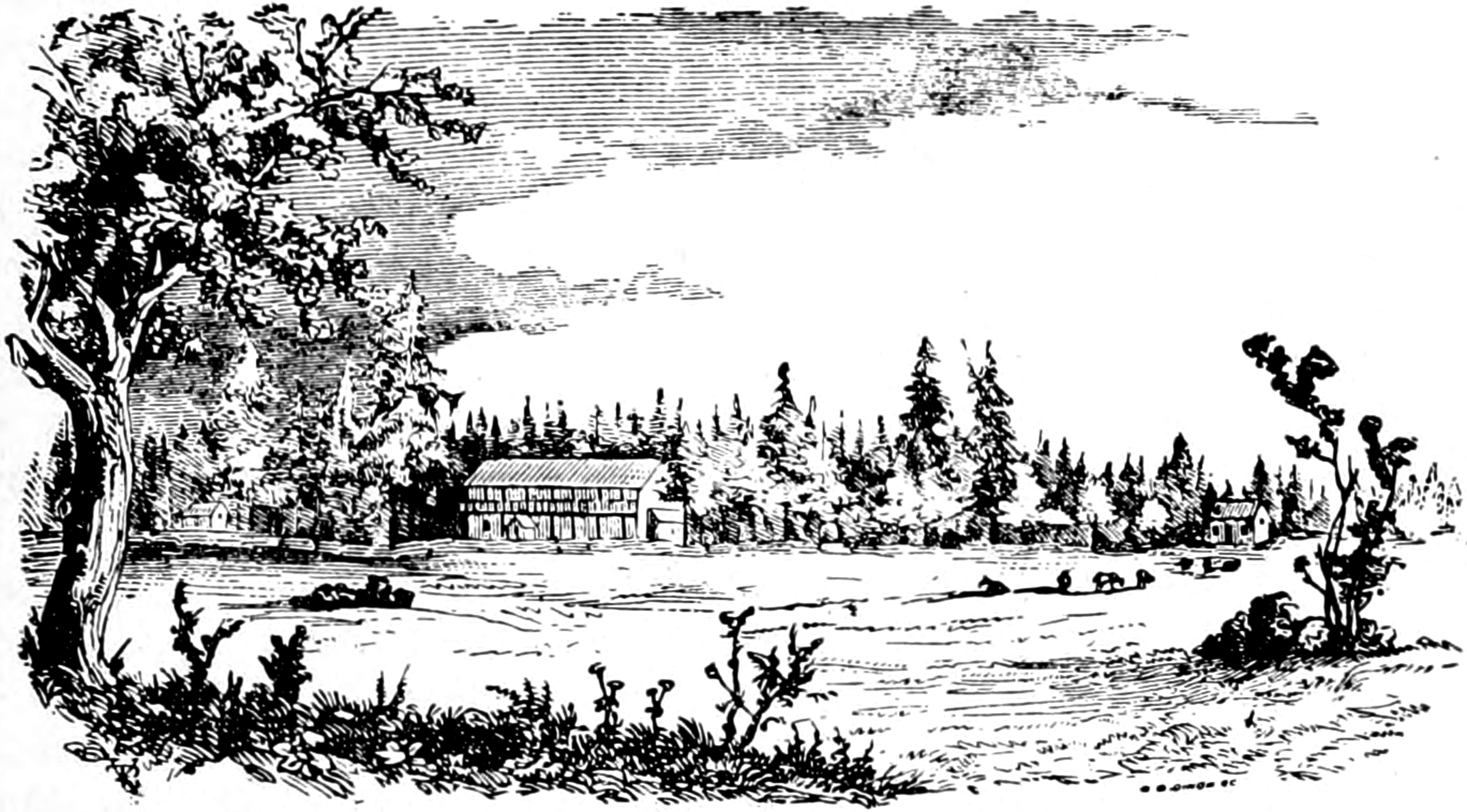
The Dalles Mission

The Provisional Legislature of Oregon and Governor George Abernethy called for "immediate and prompt action," and authorized the raising of companies of volunteers to go to war, if necessary, against the Cayuse Tribe. A fifty-person unit of volunteers was raised immediately and dispatched to The Dalles under the command of Henry A. G. Lee. Called the Oregon Rifles, they were formed on December 8, 1847, and then gathered at Fort Vancouver on December 10, where they purchased supplies from the Hudson's Bay Company (HBC) post. The HBC would not extend credit to the Provisional Government, therefore the volunteer soldiers each pledged their credit to purchase supplies with the expectation that the government would repay them at a later time. The group was to protect the Wascopam Mission at The Dalles and prevent any hostile forces from reaching the Willamette Valley. In addition, the governor appointed a peace commission, consisting of Joel Palmer, Lee, and Robert Newell.

The Oregon Rifles marched to The Dalles, arriving on December 21. Upon arriving there, they drove off a band of Native Americans, but not before the natives stole 300 head of cattle. There the troops built a stockade and named the post Fort Lee for the commander, though the small fortification was also called Fort Wascopam. In January 1848, a force of over 500 militiamen led by Colonel Cornelius Gilliam (who did not approve of the peace commission) marched against the Cayuse and other native inhabitants of central Oregon. These troops arrived at Fort Lee in February, and with a larger force, the militia forces pressed east towards the Whitman Mission. By March 4, the forces reached the mission after a battle at Sand Hollows. After reaching the mission, Colonel Gilliam set out to return to The Dalles with a small force to supply that settlement, before continuing to Oregon City to report to the governor. However, on the journey, Gilliam was accidentally killed in camp, with Lee then continuing to Oregon City with Gilliam's body. Lee was then promoted to Colonel, but upon returning to the front resigned as colonel, but remained as an officer, after learning the troops had elected Lieutenant-Colonel James Waters as colonel to lead the troops.

These militia forces were later supported by the United States Army. Some Cayuse initially refused to make peace and raided isolated settlements while others, considered friendly to the settlers, tried to work with the peace commission. The militia forces' actions led to confrontations with both friendly and hostile Native Americans. Many Cayuse resisted, but they were unable to put up an effective opposition to the firepower of their opponents and were driven into hiding in the Blue Mountains.

In 1850, the tribe handed over five members (Tilaukaikt, Tomahas, Klokamas, Isaiachalkis, and Kimasumpkin) to be tried for the murder of the Whitmans. All five Cayuse were convicted by a military commission and hanged on June 3, 1850; see Cayuse Five. The hanging was conducted by U.S. Marshal Joseph L. Meek. Kimasumpkin's final statement:

I was up the river at the time of the massacre, and did not arrive until next day. I was riding on horse back; a white woman came running from the house, she held out her hands and told me not to kill her. I put my hand upon her hand and told her not to be afraid. There were plenty of Native Americans all about. She with the other women and children went to Walla Walla to Mr. Ogden's. I was not present at the murder nor was I any way concerned in it. - I am innocent - it hurts me to talk about dying for nothing. Our chief told me to come down and tell all about it. - Those who committed the murder are killed and dead. The priest say I must die tomorrow, if they kill me I am innocent… My Young Chief told me I was to come here to tell what I know concerning the murderers. I did not come as one of the murderers, for I am innocent. - I never made any declaration to any one that I was guilty. This is the last time that I may speak.

This did not end the conflict, though, and sporadic bloodshed continued for another five years until the Cayuse were finally defeated in 1855.

== Aftermath ==
The Cayuse population and territory decreased significantly following their defeat. In 1855, they ceded most of their tribal lands, reserving the Confederated Tribes of the Umatilla Indian Reservation with the Umatilla and Walla Walla peoples. The war had significant long-term consequences for the region. The Cayuse War stressed an already frayed developing government in Oregon state. At the war's end, the crushing debt was unsurprisingly handled with little diplomacy and organization, but was eventually reimbursed through a series of negotiations. What was not restabilized, however, was the government. The Cayuse War undoubtedly made evident the nearing United States government; however, when the war ended, the provisional government ceased to exist. In its place a new, sturdier, more permanent government apt to negotiate properly with the Natives emerged. The United States government had tried to pursue a policy of treaty-making with many tribes of the Pacific Northwest; but not after seeking revenge for the Whitman massacre. In March, the military brought five Cayuse men to the capital of Oregon Country. They were charged, tried, and hanged even though their guilt and the jurisdiction of the court were not fully established. This trial had been the first capital punishment following a legal preceding in the new territory. Ambivalent responses followed the trial for decades.

== See also ==
- Coeur d'Alene War
- Fraser Canyon War
- List of conflicts in the United States
- Okanagan Trail
