= Oregon Rifles =

Oregon military force

The Oregon Rifles was the first military force organized for the protection of white settlers of the Oregon Country in the Pacific Northwest of North America. Shortly after the Whitman Massacre, Oregon Governor George Abernethy communicated to the legislature his concern about the seriousness of the conditions, and issued a call for volunteers. A company of 45 men, furnishing their own rifles and equipment, organized in Oregon City and arrived in The Dalles on December 21, 1847.

Those who did not have their own rifles were furnished arms by John McLoughlin. H. A. G. Lee was named captain of the unit.

== See also ==
- Cayuse War
- Oregon Rangers
