= Morton Matthew McCarver House =

Historic house in Oregon, United States

- U.S. National Register of Historic Places
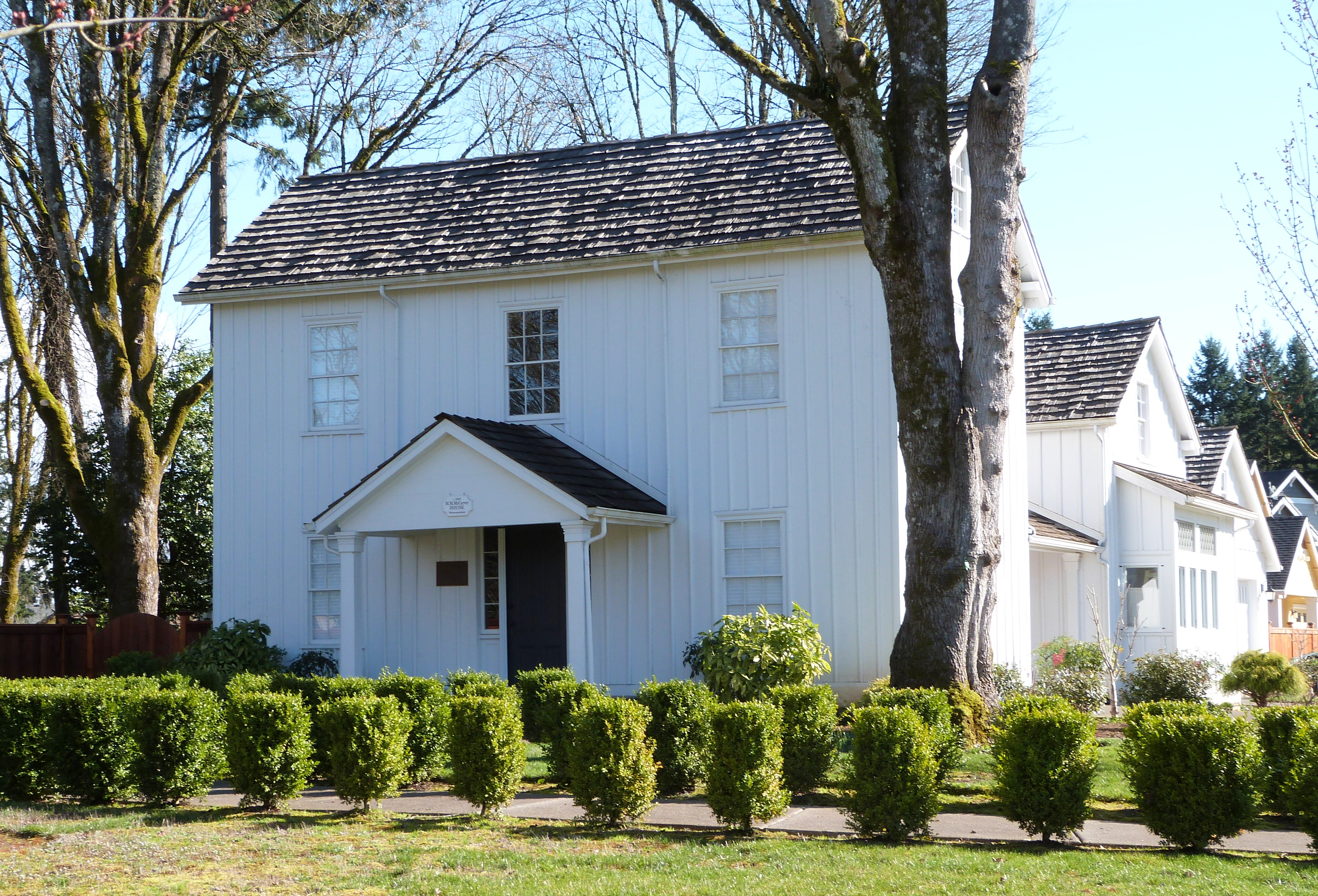

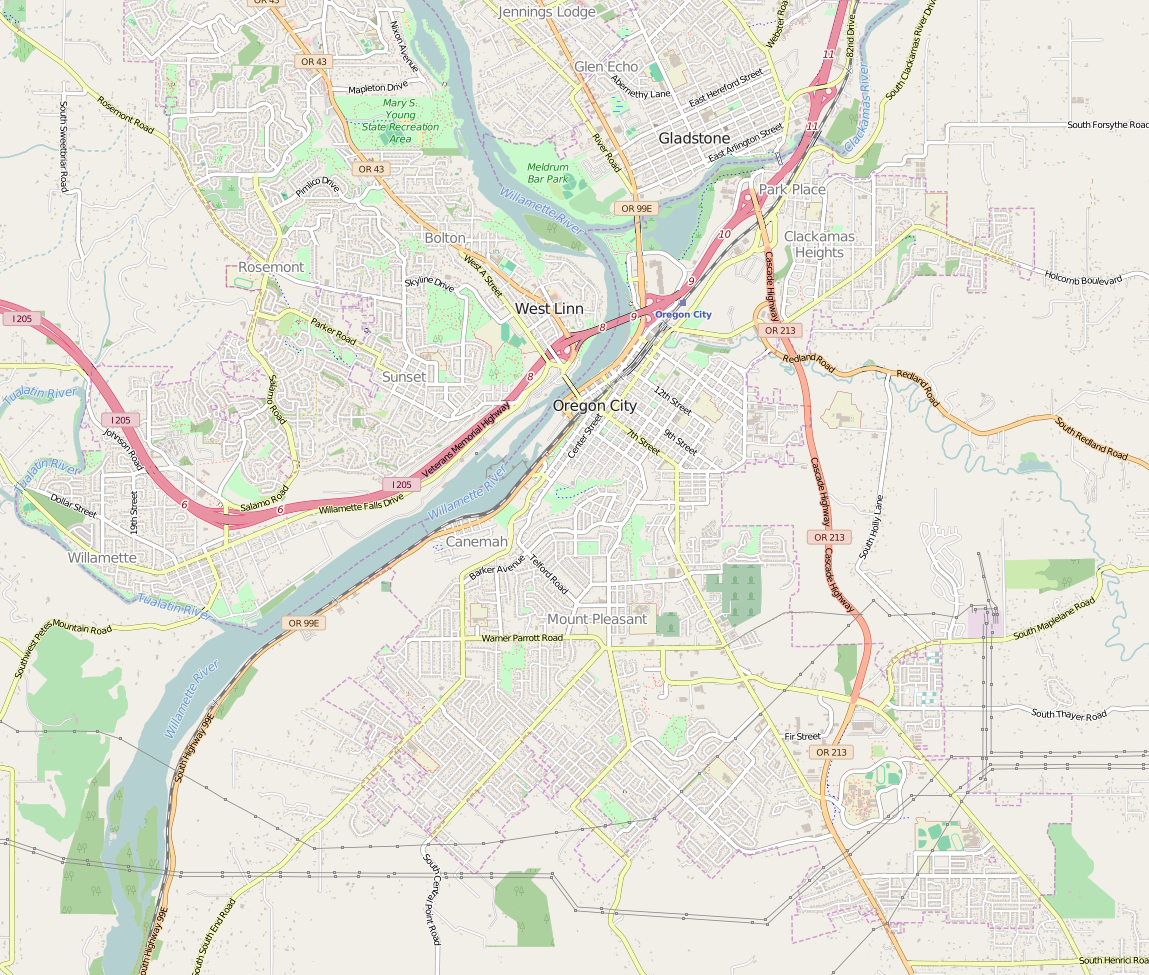
- Location within Oregon City OR Location within Oregon Location within the United States
- Location: 554 Warner-Parrot Rd., Oregon City, Oregon
- Coordinates: 45°20′11″N 122°36′32″W
- Area: 4.8 acres (1.9 ha)
- Built: 1850
- Built by: Andrew Hood
- Architectural style: Prefabricated Aladdin House
- NRHP reference No.: 74001677
- Added to NRHP: January 21, 1974

The Morton Matthew McCarver House, also known as Locust Farm, was built in 1850 in Oregon City, Oregon, United States, for Morton M. McCarver.

== History ==
The house was prefabricated in Boston with Maine lumber and shipped to Oregon via Cape Horn. At the time of its erection in the 1850s it was therefore an unusually refined residence for frontier-era Oregon. The two story wood-frame house was originally about 40 feet (12 m) deep. Subsequent additions have more than doubled its size.

McCarver arrived in Oregon in 1843, but moved to California, profiting from the California gold rush. He returned to Oregon in 1850 on his packet Ocean Bird with the building materials. In 1859 McCarver moved to Portland, selling to the Warner family, who renamed the property "Locust Farm" and lived at the place until 1947.

The McCarver House was listed on the National Register of Historic Places on January 21, 1974.

== See also ==
- National Register of Historic Places listings in Clackamas County, Oregon
