= Joseph Meek =

American pioneer, mountain man, law enforcement official, and politician(1810–1875)

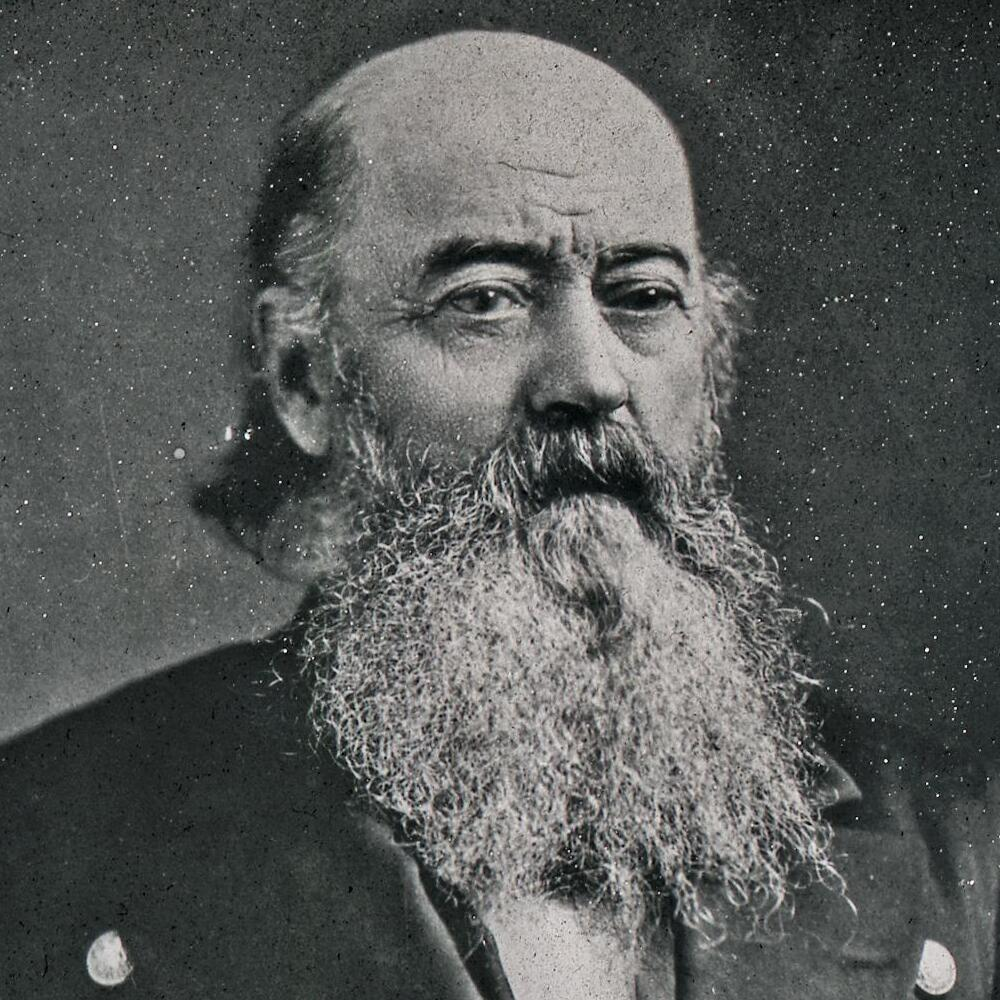

Legislator in the Provisional Government of Oregon
- In office 1846–1847
- Constituency: Tuality District

Marshal of Oregon Territory
- In office 1848–1853
- Appointed by: James K. Polk
- Preceded by: Position created
- Succeeded by: James W. Nesmith

Personal details
- Born: Joseph Lafayette Meek; February 9, 1810 Washington County, Virginia
- Died: June 20, 1875 (aged 65) Hillsboro, Oregon
- Spouse: Virginia (3rd wife)
- Relations: Stephen Meek (brother); James K. Polk (cousin)
- Occupation: Pioneer; mountain man; law enforcement official; politician

Joseph Lafayette Meek (February 9, 1810 – June 20, 1875) was an American pioneer, mountain man, law enforcement official, and politician in the Oregon Country and later Oregon Territory of the United States. A trapper involved in the fur trade before settling in the Tualatin Valley, Meek played a prominent role at the Champoeg Meetings of 1843, where he was elected sheriff. He was later elected to and served in the Provisional Legislature of Oregon before being appointed as the United States Marshal for the Oregon Territory.

== Early life ==
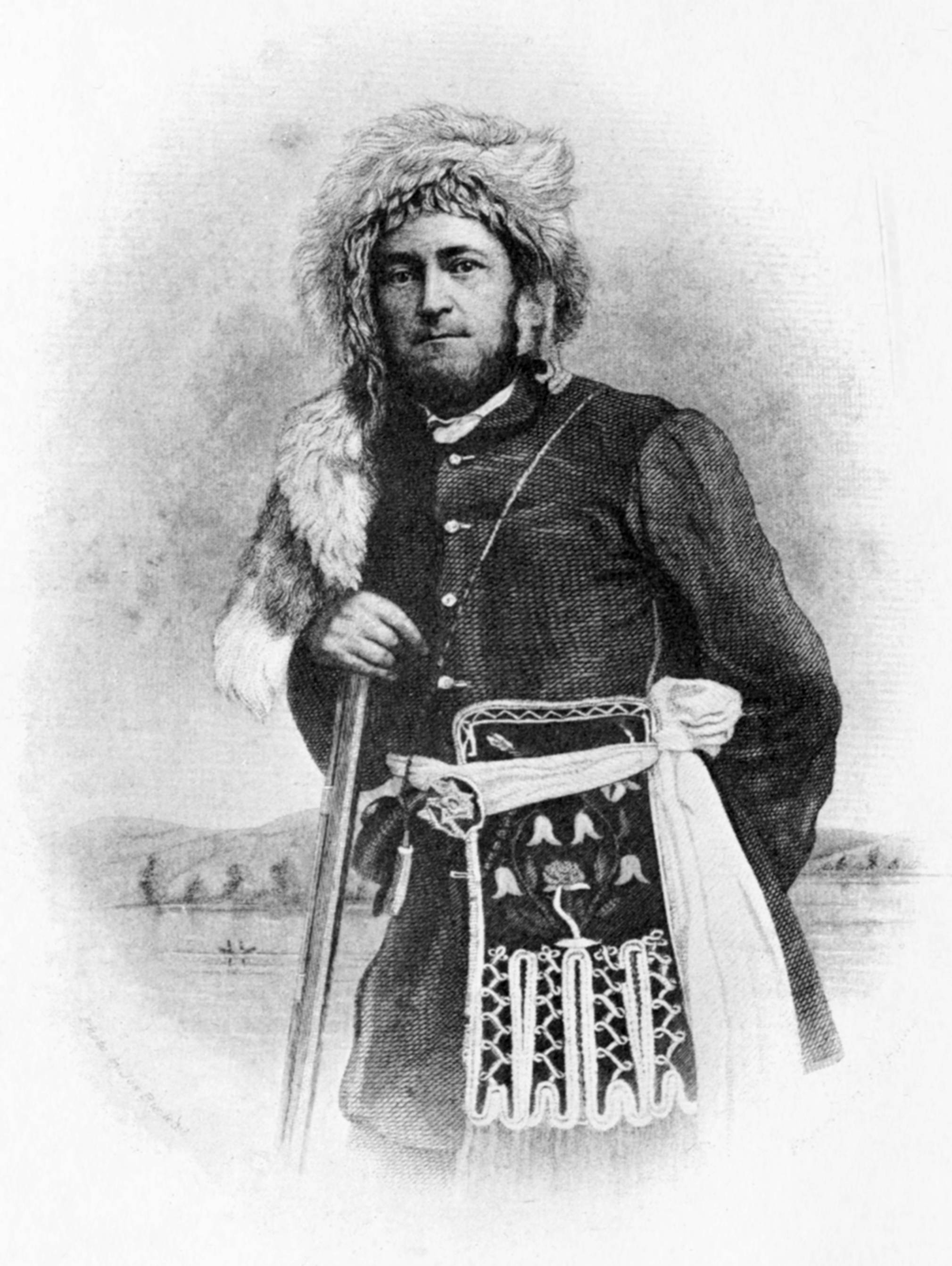
Meek as a young man

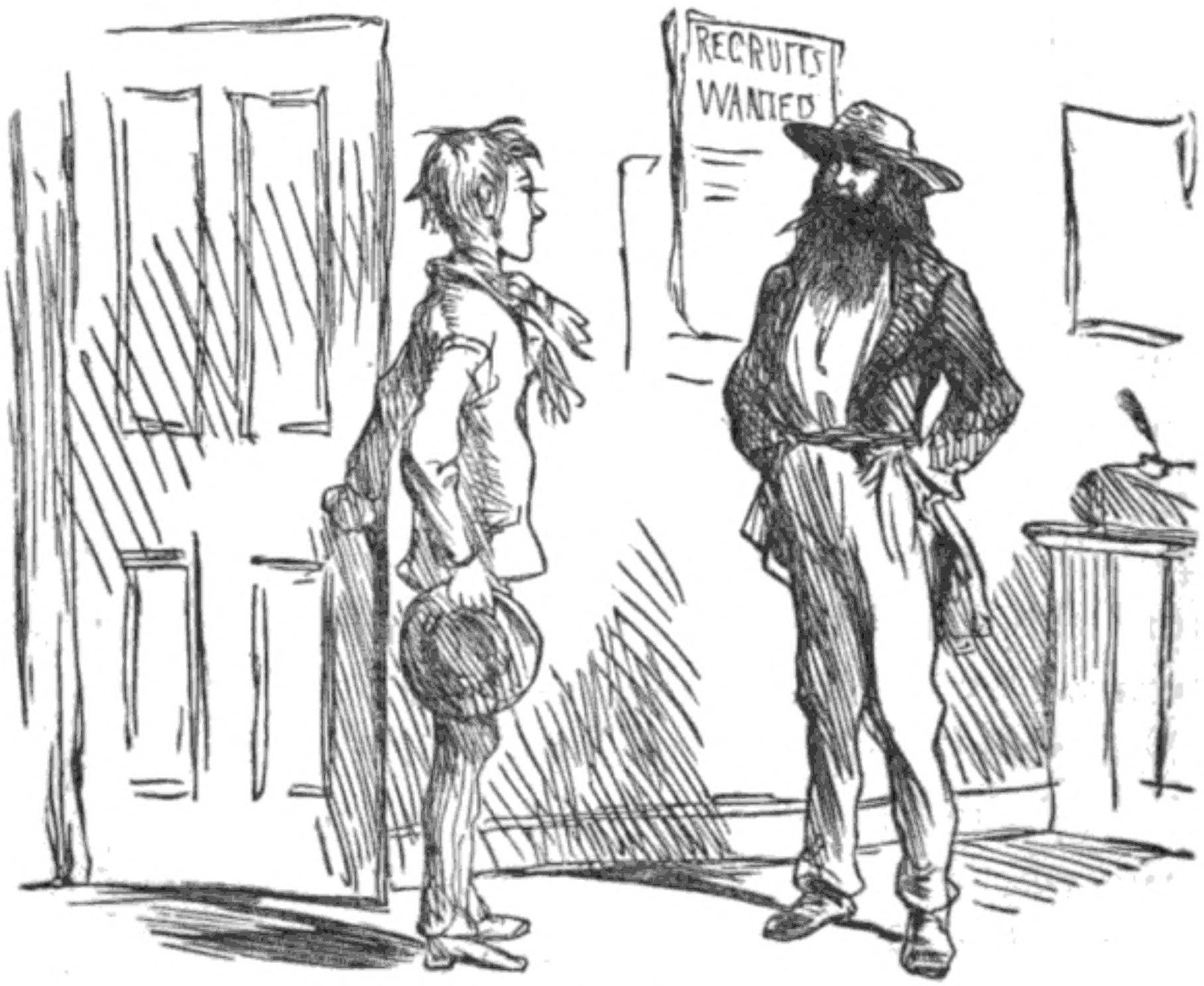
The old Joe Meek, as depicted in Frances Fuller Victor's Eleven Years in the Rocky Mountains and a Life on the Frontier, seeks employment with William Sublette.

Joseph Meek was born on February 9, 1810, to James Meek and Spica Walker in Washington County, Virginia, near the Cumberland Gap. At the age of 18 he joined William Sublette and the Rocky Mountain Fur Company, and roamed the Rocky Mountains for over a decade as a fur trapper. In about 1829, the nineteen-year-old Meek traveled with a trapping party along the Yellowstone River. A band of Blackfoot scattered the trappers, leaving Meek to travel into what is today Yellowstone National Park.

In a later account included in author Frances Fuller Victor's 1870 biography of Meek, The River of the West, Meek described the region: "The whole country beyond was smoking with the vapor from boiling springs, and burning with gasses, issuing from small craters, each of which was emitting a sharp whistling sound."

In Idaho in 1838, Meek married a woman given to him by Nez Perce chief Kowesota; it was customary for trappers to make what were called "country marriages". Her Nez Perce name is not recorded, but Meek called her "Virginia". He had previously been married to a different Nez Perce woman.

By 1840, as it was becoming clear that the fur trade was dying due both to a change in fashion preferences and the overtrapping of beaver, Meek decided to join fellow trappers Caleb Wilkins and Robert Newell in the Oregon Country. On their way there, they met a small group of emigrants at Fort Hall who were also headed to Oregon. The trappers agreed to guide them to the Whitman Mission near Fort Nez Percés. The single wagon that the group brought became the first ever to make it as far west as the mission on the Oregon Trail, although to get it there they ended up leaving the load behind.

== Oregon Country ==
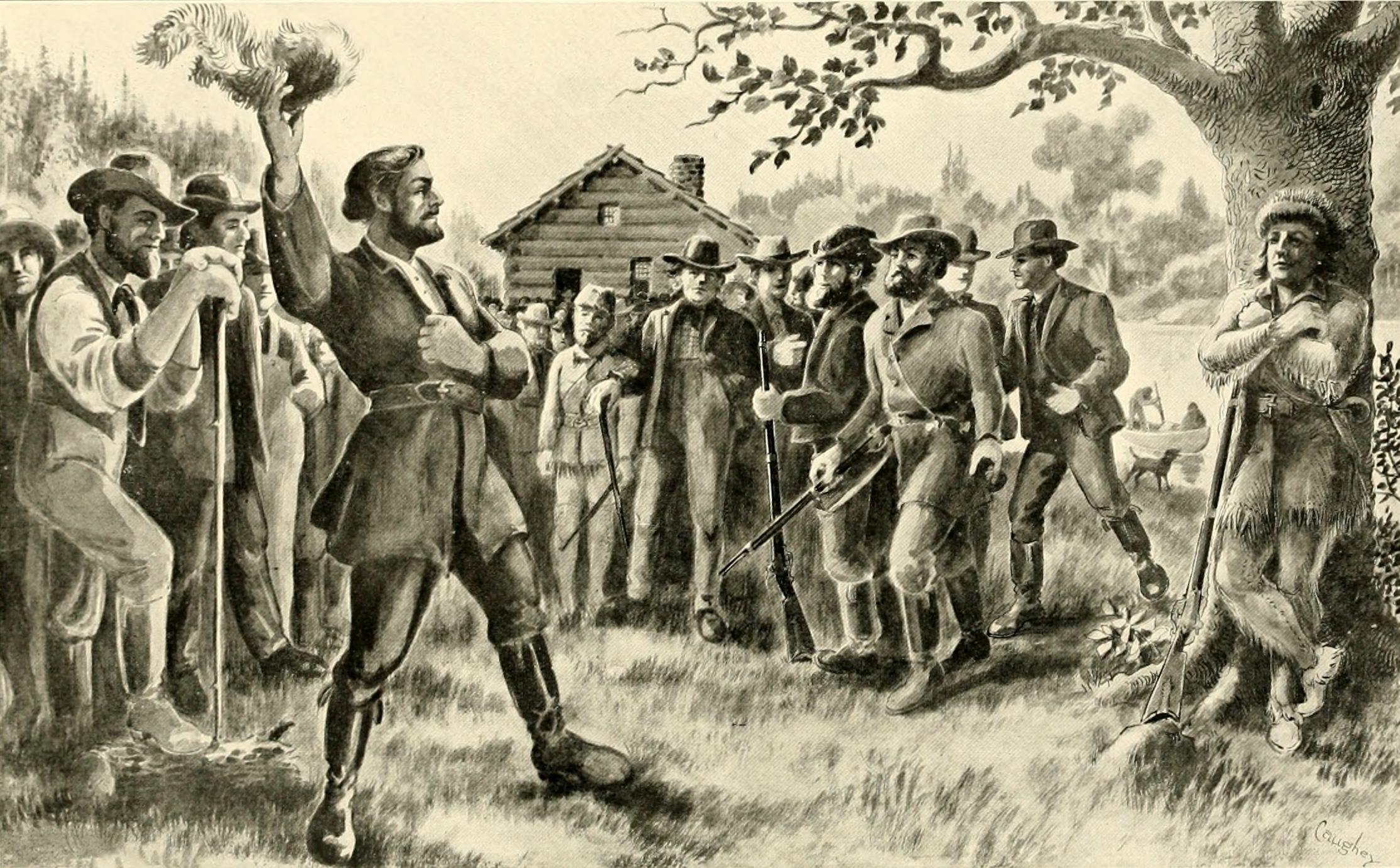
Joe Meek appeals for the American flag, at Champoeg, May 2, 1843.

In Oregon Country, Meek took to wearing a bright red sash in imitation of the French Canadian trappers employed by the Hudson's Bay Company. As the French trappers enjoyed good relations with most of the Indian tribes in the area, Meek seems to have hoped that the Indians would take him for a French Canadian or "Canadien" and leave him alone. In 1841, Meek settled in the Tualatin Valley, northwest of Oregon City, and entered into the political life of the area. In the spring of 1841, Meek served as guide in Oregon for the United States Exploring Expedition. In 1843, at meetings in Champoeg, Oregon called to form a provisional government, his was one of the foremost voices on the side of the American settlers. In 1843, when the provisional government was formed, Meek was appointed sheriff, and he was elected to the legislature in 1846 and 1847.

In the late fall of 1847, some Cayuse and Umatilla Indians killed Marcus Whitman, his wife Narcissa, and 12 others at the Whitman Mission. Among the dead was Meek's daughter by his first wife, Helen Mar Meek, age 10, who died in captivity. Meek traveled to Washington, D.C., with the news of the killings (known as the Whitman massacre) and the ensuing Cayuse War. Leaving in early January, Meek, George W. Ebbert, and John Owens made the difficult winter trip, arriving in Saint Joseph, Missouri on May 4 and proceeding to Washington by steamboat and rail.

While in Washington, where he met with President James K. Polk (whose wife Sarah Childress Polk, was Meek's cousin), he argued forcefully for making the Oregon Country a federal territory. The following spring, Joseph Lane was appointed Territorial Governor and Meek was made Territorial Federal Marshal. Meek served as Territorial Marshal for five years. His account with the Hudson's Bay Company was often in debt, the mountain man owing the company over $300 in 1849, equivalent to $11,600 in 2025. In 1850 as Marshal, he supervised the execution of five Cayuse Indians found guilty of the Whitman massacre, despite Archbishop François Norbert Blanchet defending the men as innocent. Meek organized the Oregon Volunteers and led them in the Yakima Indian War and was promoted to the rank of major for his service.

== Later years and family ==
On June 20, 1875, Meek died at his home on the land he settled on the Tualatin Plains just north of Hillsboro, Oregon, at the age of 65. His wife survived him by almost 25 years. Virginia Meek died on March 3, 1900. They are buried at the cemetery of the Tualatin Plains Presbyterian Church ("Old Scotch") north of Hillsboro, in Washington County, Oregon. As Meek said "I want to live long enough to see Oregon securely American... so I can say that I was born in Washington County, United States, and died in Washington County, United States."

His older brother Stephen Meek was also a trapper, and became known for his role in the ill-fated Meek Cutoff.

The actor Peter Whitney was cast as Meek in the 1961 episode, "Who's Fer Divide?", on the syndicated television anthology series, Death Valley Days, hosted by Stanley Andrews. The episode focuses on the annexation of the Oregon Territory. John Alderson played Meek in the 1964 Death Valley Days episode, "From the Earth, a Heritage." In that segment, a rival trapper, Nat Halper, played by Peter Whitney, pressures Meek to sell his beautiful Indian wife, Tula (Marianna Hill).
