= McCarver Neighborhood, Tacoma, Washington =

Coordinates: 47°14′30″N 122°26′49″W

The McCarver Neighborhood is located in Tacoma, Washington. It is an urban neighborhood located in the Downtown and the Hilltop area of Tacoma.

== Description ==
The neighborhood is named after McCarver Elementary School, which was the first magnet school in the nation.

The neighborhood's boundaries are South 19th Street to the north, Center Street to the south, Tacoma Ave. to the east, and South L Street to the west.

The McCarver Neighborhood was once a center of blight but in recent years has gentrified with new condominium & townhome developments along with condominium conversions from apartments.

The neighborhood's central street is maple tree lined Yakima Avenue that run north and south through the neighborhood.

There are no major employers within the McCarver neighborhood borders, but just outside are St. Joseph Medical Center (Tacoma, Washington) and the University of Washington Tacoma.
