= List of Liberty ships (A) =

This is a list of Liberty ships with names beginning with A.

== Description ==
The standard Liberty ship (EC-2-S-C1 type) was a cargo ship 441 feet 6 inches (134.57 m) long overall, with a beam of 56 feet 10 3/4 inches (17.34 m). It had a depth of 37 feet 4 inches (11.38 m) and a draft of 26 feet 10 inches (8.18 m). It was powered by a triple expansion steam engine, which had cylinders of 24 1/2 inches (62 cm), 37 inches (94 cm) and 70 inches (180 cm) diameter by 48 inches (120 cm) stroke. The engine produced 2,500ihp at 76rpm. Driving a four-blade propeller 18 feet 6 inches (5.64 m) in diameter, could propel the ship at 11 knots (20 km/h).

Cargo was carried in five holds, numbered 1–5 from bow to stern. Grain capacity was 84,183 cubic feet (2,383.8 m^{3}), 145,604 cubic feet (4,123.0 m^{3}), 96,429 cubic feet (2,730.6 m^{3}), 93,190 cubic feet (2,639 m^{3}) and 93,190 cubic feet (2,639 m^{3}), with a further 49,086 cubic feet (1,390.0 m^{3}) in the deep tanks. Bale capacity was 75,405 cubic feet (2,135.2 m^{3}), 134,638 cubic feet (3,812.5 m^{3}), 83,697 cubic feet (2,370.0 m^{3}), 82,263 cubic feet (2,329.4 m^{3}) and 82,435 cubic feet (2,334.3 m^{3}), with a further 41,135 cubic feet (1,164.8 m^{3}) in the deep tanks.

It carried a crew of 45, plus 36 United States Navy Armed Guard gunners. Later in the war, this was altered to a crew of 52, plus 29 gunners. Accommodation was in a three deck superstructure placed midships. The galley was equipped with a range, a 25 US gallons (95 L) stock kettle and other appliances. Messrooms were equipped with an electric hot plate and an electric toaster.

== Abbot L. Mills ==
Abbot L. Mills was built by Oregon Shipbuilding Corporation, Portland, Oregon. Her keel was laid on 29 September 1943. She was launched on 18 October and delivered on 26 October. Built for the War Shipping Administration (WSA), she was operated under the management of Coastwise Line. She was damaged by a mine off Dubrovnik, Yugoslavia on 10 November 1945. She was towed in to Dubrovnik and declared a constructive total loss. She was sold in July 1948, towed to Venice, Italy and repaired. Sold in 1949 to Navigazione Libera Triestina, Trieste, Italy and renamed Corallo. New diesel engine fitted by FIAT at Trieste in 1950. Collided with a Norwegian ship south east of the Isles of Scilly, United Kingdom in March 1957 and put in to Falmouth, Cornwall for repairs. Sold in 1964 to Reefer Navigation Co., Panama and renamed Marinucci. Operated under the management of Luigi Monta fu Carlo. Sold in 1965 to Grimaldia Compagnia di Navigazione, Palermo, Sicily, Italy and renamed Aquila. Laid up at La Spezia, Italy in 1970. Scrapped at La Spezia in December 1971.

== Abel Parker Upshur ==
Abel Parker Upshur was built by North Carolina Shipbuilding Company, Wilmington, North Carolina. Her keel was laid on 13 April 1942. She was launched on 28 June and delivered on 14 July. She was scrapped at Wilmington in June 1966.

== Abel Stearns ==
Abel Stearns was built by California Shipbuilding Corporation, Terminal Island, Los Angeles, California. Her keel was laid on 26 October 1942. She was launched on 25 November and delivered on 15 December. She was scrapped at Portland in June 1966.

== A. B. Hammond ==
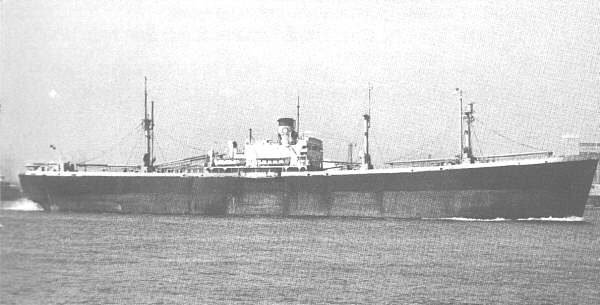
A. B. Hammond

A. B. Hammond was built by California Shipbuilding Corporation. Her keel was laid on 23 December 1943. She was launched on 21 January 1944 and delivered on 8 February. Built for the WSA, she was operated under the management of Hammond Shipping Co., San Francisco, California. Sold in 1947 to Constantine Konialidis, Montevideo, Uruguay and renamed Mario II. Sold in 1948 to Compania de Navigation Ensenada, Panama and renamed Ensenada. Operated under the management of S. G. Embiricos. Sold in 1959 to Zenith Transportation Corp., Monrovia, Liberia and renamed Cestos. Operated under the management of Fratelli Delfino. Sold in 1961 to Nigean Shipping Co., Panama and renamed Nicolaos Tsavliris. Operated under the management of Tsavliris Maritime Co., flying the Greek flag. Ran aground at Kilyos, Turkey on 25 January 1963 whilst on a voyage from Bourgas, Bulgaria to Kilyos. Refloated, but ran aground again. Sold and scrapped in situ.

== Abiel Foster ==
Abiel Foster was built by California Shipbuilding Corporation. Her keel was laid on 13 October 1941. She was launched on 22 March 1942 and delivered on 16 May. She was scrapped at Philadelphia in 1961.

== Abigail Adams ==
Abigail Adams was built by Permanente Metals Corporation, Richmond, California. Her keel was laid on 24 February 1943. She was launched on 21 March and delivered on 1 April. Post-war, she was laid up at Beaumont, Texas. She was scrapped at Brownsville, Texas in October 1972.

== Abigail Gibbons ==
Abigail Gibbons was built by J. A. Jones Construction Co., Brunswick, Georgia. Her keel was laid on 1 September 1944. She was launched on 12 October and delivered on 25 October. Built for the WSA, she was operated under the management of American-Foreign Steamship Co. She was laid up at Mobile, Alabama post-war. Scrapped at Panama City, Florida in December 1971.

== Abigail S. Duniway ==
Abigail S. Duniway was built by Oregon Shipbuilding Corporation. Her keel was laid on 5 January 1944. She was launched on 21 January and delivered on 29 January. Built for the WSA, she was operated under the management of Weyerhaeuser Steamship Company. She was laid up in 1946, then sold in 1947 to Compania Levante de Vapores, Panama and renamed Virago. Sold in 1949 to Società Azioni Emanuele V. Parodi, Genoa, Italy and renamed Angelo Parodi. Sold in 1962 to Armosy Corp., Liberia and renamed Armosy. Operated under the management of Sturla Società di Navigazione. Scrapped at Osaka, Japan in October 1963.

== Abner Doubleday ==
Abner Doubleday was built by Oregon Shipbuilding Corporation. Her keel was laid on 25 October 1942. She was launched on 20 November and delivered on 30 November. She was scrapped at New Orleans, Louisiana in January 1968.

== Abner Nash ==
Abner Nash was built by North Carolina Shipbuilding Company. Her keel was laid on 4 October 1942. She was launched on 15 November and delivered on 27 November. She was scrapped at Philadelphia in 1964.

== Abraham Baldwin ==
Abraham Baldwin was built by Delta Shipbuilding Company, New Orleans. Her keel was laid on 22 December 1941. She was launched on 16 May 1942 and delivered on 21 July. Laid up at Mobile post-war. Scuttled as an artificial reef off Horn Island, Mississippi on 30 April 1976.

== Abraham Clark ==
Abraham Clark was built by California Shipbuilding Corporation. Her keel was laid on 3 December 1941. She was launched on 2 April 1942 and delivered on 10 June. Built for the WSA, she was operated under the management of Grace Line. Management transferred to Waterman Steamship Corporation, Mobile, Alabama in 1946. Sold to her managers in 1947 and renamed Governor Dixon. Sold in 1949 to Consolidated Ocean Carriers Corp., New York and renamed Dolly. Sold later that year to Aeolian Steamship Corp., Delaware, New York. Renamed Lipari in 1950. Collided with the French tug Ambes in the Gironde on 3 September 1955. Ambes sank with the loss of three of her crew. Ran aground off Grays Harbor, Washington on 23 October 1959 whilst on a voyage from Calcutta, India to Seattle, Washington. Refloated on 30 October and taken in to Portland in a severely damaged condition. Subsequently towed to Japan. Scrapped at Nagasaki in July 1960.

== Abraham Lincoln ==
Abraham Lincoln was built by Delta Shipbuilding Company. Her keel was laid on 21 October 1942. She was launched on 12 December and delivered on 30 December. She was scrapped at Mobile in December 1967.

== Abraham Rosenburg ==
Abraham Rosenburg was built by New England Shipbuilding Corporation, South Portland, Maine. Her keel was laid on 25 August 1944. She was launched on 7 October and delivered on 18 October. Built for the WSA, she was operated under the management of Seas Shipping Co. Management transferred to American Pacific Steamship Co. Laid up in 1948. Sold in 1951 to General Steamship Corp., San Francisco and renamed Western Ocean. Sold in 1955 to Atlanta Shipping Corp., New York and renamed Transwestern, sailing under the flag of Liberia. Sold later that year to St. John Shipping & Trading Corp. and renamed Santa Madre. Remaining under the Liberian flag and operated under the management of Maritime Trade Corp. Sold in 1961 to Peggy Navigation Co., Panama and renamed Tuscany. Remaining under the Liberian flag and operated under the management of Wallem & Co. Ran aground on the Ladd Reef (8°40′N 111°40′E) on 2 December 1962 whilst on a voyage from Borneo to Hong Kong. Declared a constructive total loss and salvage attempts were abandoned.

== Abram S. Hewitt ==
Abram S. Hewitt was built by Permanente Metals Corporation. Her keel was laid on 15 December 1943. She was launched on 5 January 1944 and delivered on 13 January. Built for the WSA, she was operated under the management of Black Diamond Steamship Corp. Sold in 1947 to Compania Transoceanica La Veloce, Genoa and renamed Quemar. Renamed Italo Marsano later that year, then Golfo di Trieste in 1957. Sold in 1962 to Compania Generale di Navigazione. Sprang a leak and sank off the coast of South Vietnam (11°10′N 112°31′E) on 14 December 1964 whilst on a voyage from Gijón, Spain to a Japanese port.

== Acubens ==
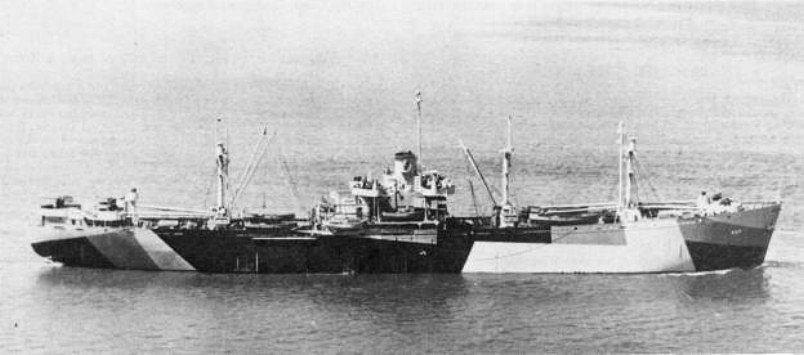
USS Acubens

Acubens was built by the Delta Shipbuilding Company. She was laid down as Jean Louis on25 November 1943. She was launched on 8 January 1944 and was delivered on 9 February 1944 by Todd-Johnson Dry Docks, New Orleans as Acubens for the United States Navy. Decommissioned at Pearl Harbor, Hawaii in March 1946. Towed to San Francisco. To United States Maritime Commission (USMC) in June 1947 and laid up. Scrapped at Portland, Oregon in 1965.

== Ada Rehan ==
Ada Rehan was built by Permanente Metals Corporation. Her keel was laid on 18 December 1943. She was launched on 8 January 1944 and delivered on 17 January. Built for the WSA, she was operated under the management of Pope & Talbot Inc. Sold in 1947 to Navigazione Alta Italia, Genoa and renamed Monviso. Ran aground off St. Margaret's Bay, Kent, United Kingdom on 21 February 1955. She was refloated with the assistance of tugs. Laid up at La Spezia in 1966 and scrapped there in 1967.

== Addie Bagley Daniels ==
Addie Bagley Daniels was built by Southeastern Shipbuilding Corporation. Her keel was laid on 21 August 1944. She was launched on 28 September and delivered on 12 October. She was laid up in the James River post-war. Scuttled off St. Catherines Island, Georgia on 9 July 1975.

== Adhara ==
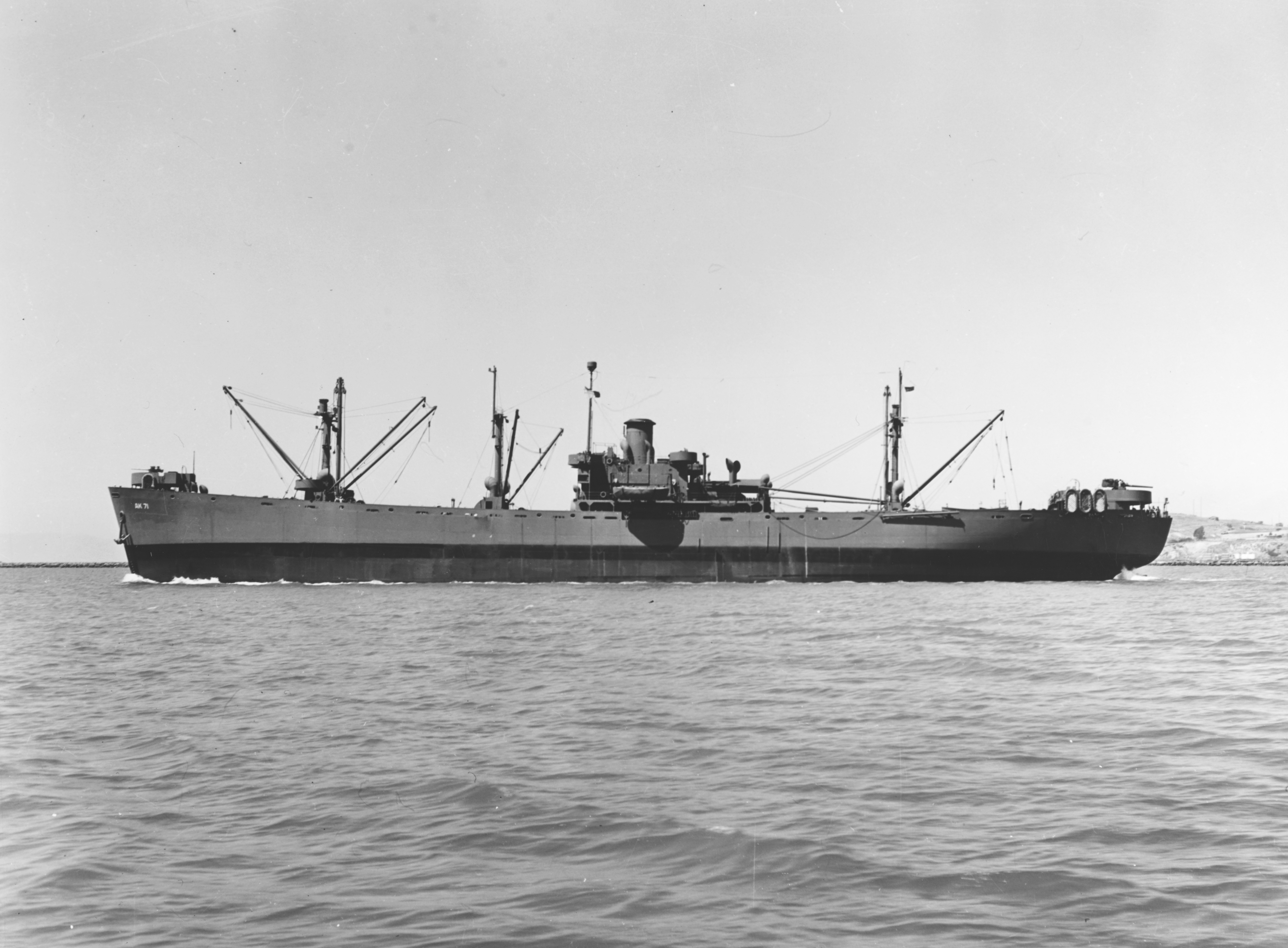
USS Adhara

Adhara was built by Permanente Metals Corporation. Laid down as G. H. Corliss on 16 September 1942, she was launched on 27 October and delivered on 6 November as Adhara for the United States Navy. Returned to WSA in December 1945 and renamed G. H. Corliss. Scrapped at Gandia, Spain in March 1972.

== Adolph Lewisohn ==
Adolph Lewisohn was built by Bethlehem Fairfield Shipyard, Baltimore, Maryland. Her keel was laid on 13 September 1943. She was launched as Adolph Lewisohn on 6 October and delivered as Samota on 13 October. To Ministry of War Transport (MoWT) under Lend-Lease. Operated under the management of Elder Dempster Lines, Liverpool, United Kingdom. Sold to her managers in 1947 and renamed Zungeru. Sold in 1958 to Society Pacifica Marina, Panama and renamed Poros. Operated under the Liberian flag and the management of N. J. Goulandris. Sold in 1959 to Casa Blanca Shipping Corp., Liberia and placed under the management of Suwanee Steamship Co. Sold in 1966 to Marestela Compania Navigation, Panama and renamed Mery. Operated under the Greek flag and management of Franco Shipping Co. Sold in 1968 to Toula Shipping Co., Cyprus, remaining under the same managers. Scrapped at Avilés, Spain in October 1971.

== Adolph S. Ochs ==
Adolph S. Ochs was built by Bethlehem-Fairfield Shipyard. Her keel was laid on 30 August 1943. She was launched on 23 September and delivered as Samwyo on 2 October. To MoWT under Lend-Lease. Operated under the management of Cayzer, Irvine & Co., London. Renamed Adolph S. Ochs later that year. Management transferred to G. Nisbet & Co. in 1946. Returned to America in 1948 and laid up at Wilmington, Delaware. Scrapped at Kearny, New Jersey in December 1968.

== Adolph Sutro ==
Adolph Sutro was built by Permanente Metals Corporation. Her keel was laid on 12 May 1943. She was launched on 4 June and delivered on 16 June. She was scrapped at Tacoma, Washington in May 1961.

== Adoniram Judson ==
Adoniram Judson was built by Permanente Metals Corporation. Her keel was laid on 13 January 1943. She was launched on 19 February and delivered on 3 March. Built for the WSA, she was operated under the management of W. R. Chamberlin & Co. Laid up at Beaumont post-war, she was scrapped at Brownsville in January 1974.

== Aedanus Burke ==
Aedanus Burke was built by Delta Shipbuilding Company. Her keel was laid on 17 February 1943. She was launched on 27 March and delivered on 10 April. She was scrapped at New Orleans in April 1964.

== A. Frank Lever ==
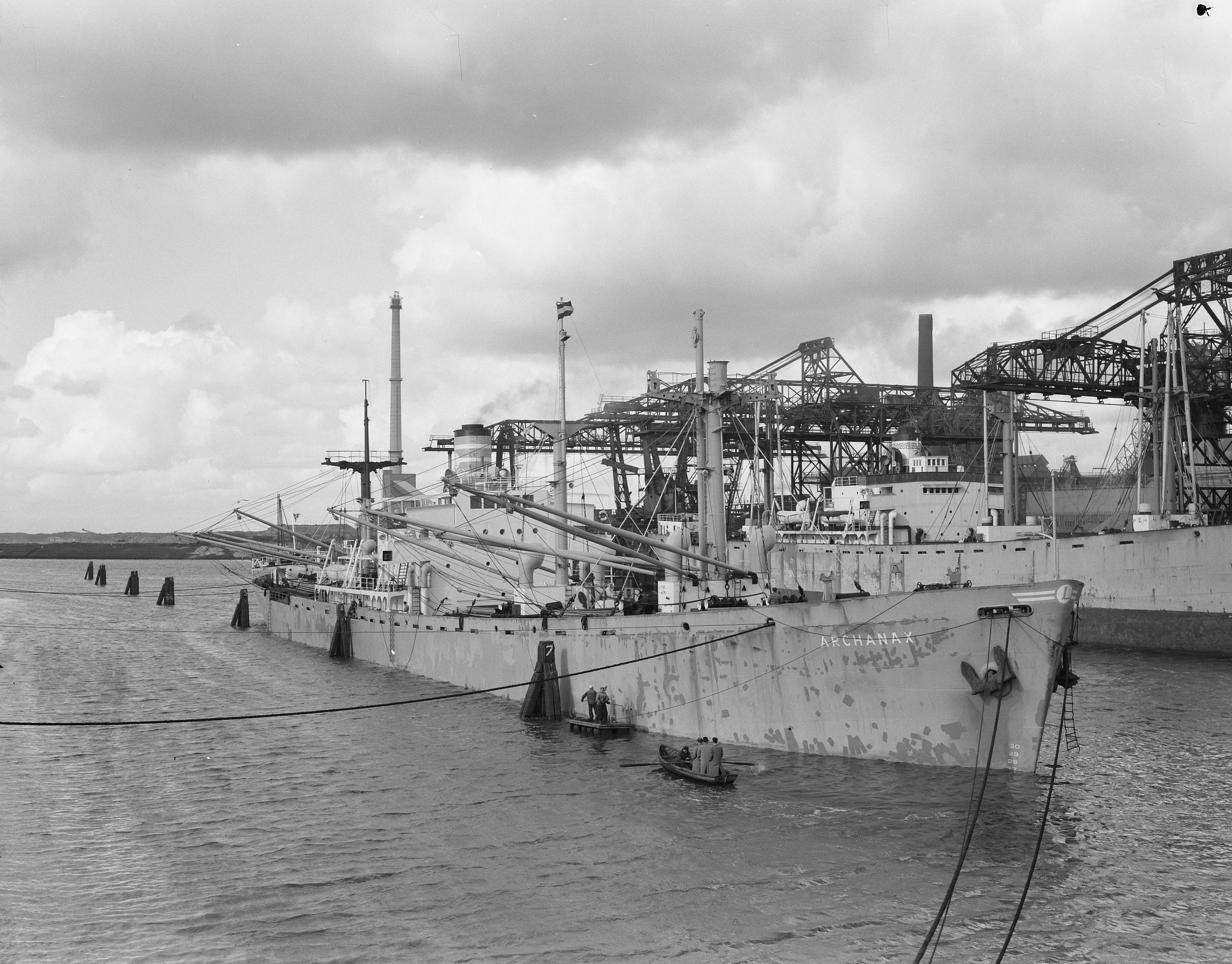
Archanax

A. Frank Lever was built by Southeastern Shipbuilding Corporation, Savannah, Georgia. Her keel was laid on 29 October 1943. She was launched on 7 December and delivered on 21 December. Built for the WSA, she was operated under the management of States Marine Corp., New York. Sold in 1947 to Skibs A/S Vard, Oslo, Norway and renamed Brott. Operated under the management of Jacobsen & Salvesen. Sold in 1948 to Henriksens Rederi A/S, Oslo and placed under the management of Dagfin Henriksen. Sold in 1951 to A/S Norfinn, Oslo. Operated under the management of Jorgen Krag. Sold in 1954 to Liberian Sea Transport Corp., Monrovia and renamed Archanax. Operated under the management of G. M. Livanos. Sold in 1967 to Delta Marine Corp., Liberia and renamed Mistral. Operated under the management of Scio Shipping Inc. Scrapped at Kaohsiung, Taiwan in 1968.

== A. J. Cassatt ==
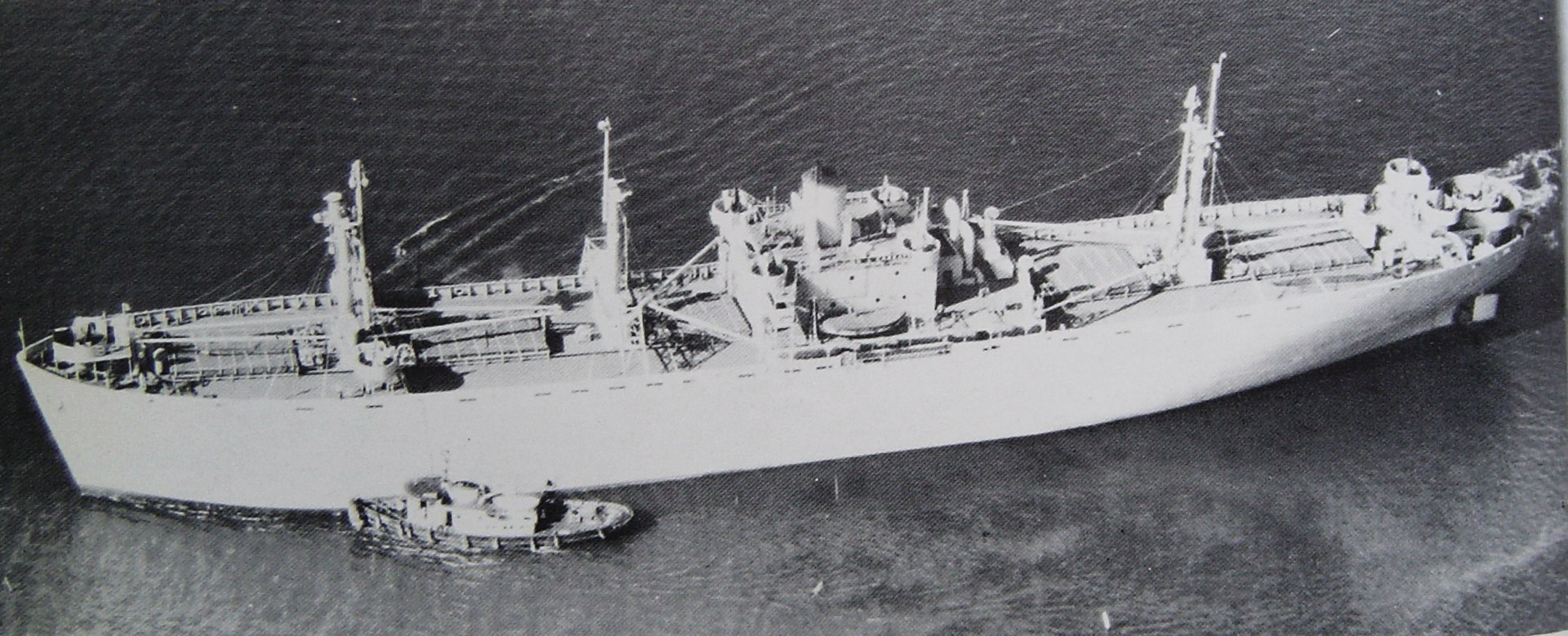
A. J. Cassat

A. J. Cassat was built by the Bethlehem Fairfield Shipyard. Her keel was laid on 20 June 1944. She was launched on 27 July and delivered on 10 August. To United States Navy as USS Appanoose. Returned to WSA in November 1945. Renamed A. J. Cassat and laid up in reserve. Sold in 1947 to Compania Navigation Operaciones Maritimas, Panama and renamed Santa Ana. Sold in 1951 to San Martin Compania di Navigation, Panama. In December 1956, her captain was taken ill at sea when Santa Ana was 450 nautical miles (830 km) south east of Cape Race, Newfoundland, Canada. He was transferred to RMS Queen Mary and taken to New York, United States for treatment. Placed under the management of Cargo & Tankship Management Corp. in 1958. Management transferred in 1961 to Santa Maria Shipowning & Trading Co. (Bermuda) Ltd. Arrived at Yokohama, Japan on 4 November 1964 having lost her propeller. Scrapped at Yokohama in January 1965.

== A. J. Cermak ==
A. J. Cermak was built by the Bethlehem Fairfield Shipyard. Her keel was laid on 9 November 1943. She was launched on 30 November and delivered on 8 December. She was scrapped at Philadelphia, Pennsylvania in 1964.

== Alan Seeger ==
Alan Seeger was a tanker built by California Shipbuilding Corporation. She was completed in October 1943. Built for the WSA, she was operated under the management of Los Angeles Tanker Operators Inc. Management transferred to American Pacific Steamship Co. in 1948. Laid up in Suisun Bay in 1948. Sold in 1951 to Charles Kurz & Co. Operated under the management of Keystone Shipping Co. Sold in 1954 to Seatankers Inc. Renamed Bengt H. Larson and reflagged to Liberia. Rebuilt at Kure, Japan as a 511 feet 6 inches (155.91 m) long, 8,471 GRT ore carrier in 1955. Sold in 1959 to Intercoastal Shipping & Trading Corp. Renamed Sealady and reflagged to the United States. Operated under the management of Paroh Steamship Corp. Management changed to United Shipowners Agency in 1963. Sold for scrapping in 1968. On 9 August 1968, she was damaged by the James Madison-class submarine USS Von Steuben surfacing underneath her in the Gulf of Cádiz (36°34′N 6°16′W). Sealady was being towed from Panama City to Rijeka, Yugoslavia. She was beached in Cádiz Bay and abandoned. She was reported to be sinking into the sands in April 1969.

== Alanson B. Houghton ==
Alanson B. Houghton was built by J. A. Jones Construction Co, Panama City, Florida. Her keel was laid on 19 January 1944. She was launched on 14 March and delivered on 15 April. She was laid up at Mobile post-war. Scrapped at Panama City, Florida in November 1972.

== Albert Abraham Michelson ==
Albert Abraham Michelson was built by Oregon Shipbuilding Corporation. Her keel was laid on 30 September 1943. She was launched on 20 October and delivered on 28 October. Built for the WSA, she was operated under the management of R. A. Nicol & Co. Sold in 1947 to Andreas G. Caravias, Athens, Greece and renamed Panaghia Kathariotis. Renamed Panaghia K. in 1949. Sold in 1952 to Gerassimos G. Caravias, Athens. Sold in 1960 to Costas G. Caravias. On 9 December 1966, she sprang a leak in the Pacific Ocean (27°51′N 126°41′E). She was escorted in to Okinawa, Japan. Panaghia K. was scrapped in Kaohsiung in February 1967.

== Albert A. Robinson ==
Albert A. Robinson was built by Permanente Metals Corporation. Her keel was laid on 11 November 1943. She was launched on 29 November and delivered on 7 December. She was scrapped at Oakland, California in 1958.

== Albert B. Cummins ==
Albert B. Cummins was built by Oregon Shipbuilding Corporation. Her keel was laid on 1 March 1943. She was launched on 23 March and delivered on 31 March. She was scrapped at Seattle in 1961.

== Albert C. Ritchie ==
Albert C. Ritchie was built by Bethlehem Fairfield Shipyard. Her keel was laid on 12 May 1943. She was launched on 6 June and delivered on 16 June. Built for the WSA, she was operated under the management of Merchants & Miners Transport Co. Management transferred to States Marine Lines Corp. in 1946. Sold to her managers in 1947. Renamed Global Miller and transferred to Global Transport Ltd., Panama. Sold in 1948 to Torvald Klaveness Rederi, Oslo and renamed Lesje. Sold in 1949 to Skibs A/S Akershus and renamed Sokna. Operated under the management of Gorrissen & Klaveness. Sold in 1950 to Skibs A/S Akerviken, remaining under the same management. Rebuilt as a 7,271 GRT LNG carrier in 1959. Sold in 1964 to Compania Navigation Angela, Panama. Renamed Angela II and reflagged to Liberia. Operated under the management of Community Chartering Corp. Converted to a cargo ship in 1966. Sold in 1973 to Seatrain International SA, Panama, remaining under the Liberian flag. Scrapped at Kaohsiung in May 1973.

== Albert Gallatin ==
Albert Gallatin was built by California Shipbuilding Corporation. Her keel was laid on 11 September 1941. She was launched on 12 February 1942 and delivered on 30 April. Built for the WSA, she was operated under the management of American-Hawaiian Steamship Company. On 28 July 1943, off Savannah, Georgia, she was struck by three torpedoes fired by U-107, all of which failed to explode. Management transferred to Isthmian Steamship Company in 1944. Torpedoed and sunk in the Arabian Sea (21°21′N 59°58′E) by I-26 on 2 January 1944 whilst on a voyage from New York to Bandar Shapur, Iran.

== Albert G. Brown ==
Albert G. Brown was a tanker built by Delta Shipbuilding Company. Her keel was laid on 3 September 1943. She was launched on 18 October and delivered on 30 November. Built for the WSA, she was operated under the management of American Trading & Production Corp. Sold in 1948 to Bernuth Lembcke Co., New York. Sold in 1955 to Torres Shipping Co. Reflagged to Liberia and placed under the management of Bernuth Lembke. Scrapped at Hirao, Japan in November 1965.

== Albert J. Berres ==
Albert J. Berres was a tanker built by California Shipbuilding Corporation. She was completed in September 1943. Built for the WSA, she was operated under the management of Union Oil Company of California. Sold in 1948 to Strathmore Shipping Co., New York and renamed Strathmore. Sold in 1950 to Dolphin Steamship Company, New York. Converted at Savannah to a 7,197 GRT cargo ship and renamed Nikoklis. Sold in 1954 to American Waterways Corp. and renamed Captain N. B. Palmer. Sold later that hear to Noya Compania Naviera. Renamed National Unity and reflagged to Liberia. Operated under the management of National Shipping & Trading Corp. Rebuilt at Kobe in 1955 as a 511 feet 6 inches (155.91 m) long, 8,562 GRT ore carrier. Sold in 1961 to Hellenic Shipping & Industries, Piraeus, Greece and renamed Serre. Sold in 1963 to North Pacific Trading Co., Panama. Renamed Unity and reflagged to Liberia. Operated under the management of Phoenix Maritime Agencies. Sold in 1965 to Aris Steamship Co., Liberia and renamed Evie W. Operated under the management of Astoria Steamship Co. Management transferred to Atlantic Shipping Co. in 1966. Sold in 1968 to Trans World Steamship Co. and renamed Eastern Venture. Reflagged to Liberia and operated under the management of Grauds Shipping Ltd. Scrapped at Canton, China in December 1968.

== Albert K. Smiley ==
Albert K. Smiley was built by J. A. Jones Construction Company, Brunswick. Her keel was laid on 20 October 1944. She was launched on 21 November and delivered on 30 November. Built for the WSA, She was operated under the management of International Freighting Corp. She was scrapped at Panama City, Florida in October 1965.

== Albert M. Boe ==
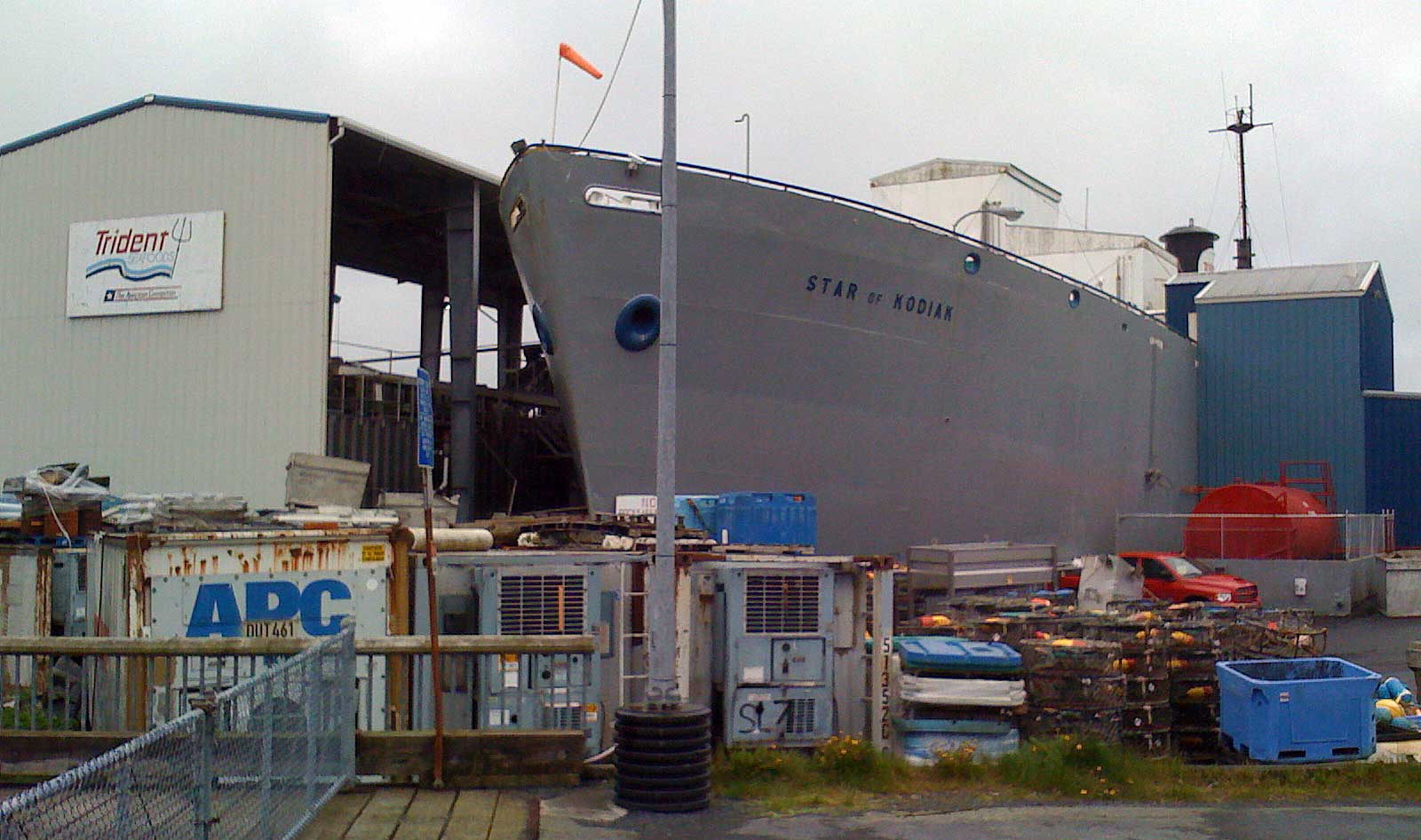
Star of Kodiak

Albert M. Boe was a boxed aircraft transport ship built by New England Shipbuilding Corporation. Laid down on 11 July 1945, launched on 26 September and delivered on 30 October, she was the last Liberty ship built. She served with the United States Army Transportation Corps. Acquired by the United States Navy in December 1949 and transferred to the Military Sea Transportation Service. Returned to the United States Government c. 1954 and laid up in reserve. Sold for scrapping at Portland, Oregon in 1964, but converted to a floating factory ship stationed at Kodiak, Alaska. Renamed Star of Kodiak. Survives as of 2026.

== Albert P. Ryder ==
Albert P. Ryder was built by California Shipbuilding Corporation. Her keel was laid on 8 August 1943. She was launched on 30 August and delivered on 15 September. Built for the WSA, she was operated under the management of the South Atlantic Steamship Line. Sold in 1947 to Michalinos Maritime & Commercial Co., Piraeus and renamed Leonidas Michalos. Operated under the management of C. Michalos & Co. Management transferred to Victoria Steamship Co. in 1963. Scrapped at Hamburg, West Germany in March 1966.

== Albert S. Burleson ==
Albert S. Burleson was built by Todd Houston Shipbuilding Corporation, Houston, Texas. Her keel was laid on 14 September 1943. She was launched on 28 October and delivered on 11 November. Laid up in the James River post war, she was scrapped at Santander, Spain in January 1971.

== Albino Perez ==
Albino Perez was built by California Shipbuilding Corporation. Her keel was laid on 12 August 1943. She was launched on 4 September and delivered on 19 September. She was scrapped at Baltimore in January 1961.

== Albireo ==
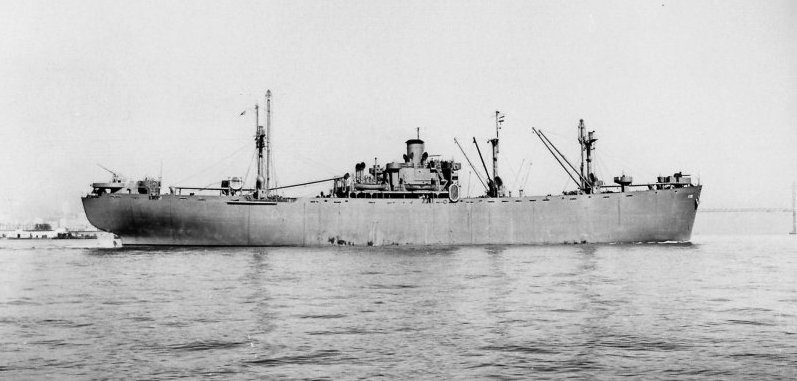
USS Albireo

Albireo was built by Permanente Metals Corporation. She was launched as John G. Nicolay and completed as Albireo for the United States Navy in March 1943. To WSA in 1946 and renamed John G. Nicolay. Sold in 1947 to Southern Steamship Ltd., Johannesburg, Union of South Africa and renamed President Steyn. Sold in 1949 to Northern Steamship Ltd., Johannesburg. Sold in 1951 to Compania Navigation Hidalgo, Panama and renamed Hidalgo. Reflagged to Liberia and operated under the management of Southern Star Shipping Co. Sold in 1954 to Blue Bay Steamship Corp. Remaining under the Liberian flag and placed under the management of Jason Steamship Co. Scrapped at Etajima, Japan in April 1967.

== Alcee Fortier ==
Alcee Fortier was built by Delta Shipbuilding Company. Her keel was laid on 16 May 1944. She was launched on 7 July and delivered on 22 August. She was scrapped at New Orleans in 1964.

== Ales Hrdlicka ==
Ales Hrdlicka was built by Delta Shipbuilding Company. Her keel was laid on 24 August 1944. She was launched on 7 October and delivered on 13 November. Built for the WSA, she was operated under the management of Alcoa Steamship Co. Sold in 1947 to Matson Navigation Co., New York and renamed Hawaiian Logger. Sold in 1960 to Northern Steamship Co., New York and renamed Cape Cod. Sold in 1961 to Artemesion Steamship Co., Panama. Renamed Artemesion and reflagged to Greece. Reflagged to Liberia in 1963. Ran aground off Gaidhouronisi Island, Crete, Greece on 25 January 1964 whilst on a voyage from Port Sudan to a Venezuelan port. Driven further ashore on 29 January. Refloated on 17 February and towed to Piraeus and then Ambeliki Bay. Declared a constructive total loss, she was scrapped at Split, Yugoslavia in June 1965.

== Alexander Baranof ==
Alexander Baranof

Alexander Baranof was built by Permanente Metals Corporation. Her keel was laid on 6 March 1943. She was launched on 4 April and delivered on 17 April. To the Soviet Union under Lend-Lease and renamed Valery Chkalov. Broke in two in the Pacific Ocean (54°22′N 164°49′E) on 12 December 1943 whilst on a voyage from Port Sovetskaya, Soviet Union to Portland, Oregon. Both sections were towed in to Adak, Alaska. Towed to Kodiak in April 1944, then to Vancouver, Washington. She was repaired and renamed Alexander Baranof. Laid up at Wilmington, Delaware in 1946. Scrapped at Philadelphia in 1965.

== Alexander E. Brown ==
Alexander E. Brown was built by J. A. Jones Construction Company, Panama City. Her keel was laid on 18 August 1944. She was launched on 28 September and delivered on 13 October. Built for the WSA, she was operated under the management of South Atlantic Steamship Line. Sold in 1946 to Nicholas Eustathiou, Piraeus. Sold in 1947 to Compania de Navigation Phoceana de Panama. Renamed Michalkis, remaining under the Greek flag. Resold later that year to Nicholas Eustatiou. Sold in 1958 to Memphis Maritime Co., Piraeus. Sold in 1963 to Nimor Corp. and renamed Georgiakis. Reflagged to Panama and placed under the management of P. Wigham Richardson & Co. Sold in 1965 to Compania de Navigation Limar and renamed Humboldt. Operated under the management of Consorcio Naviero Peruano and remaining under the Panamanian flag. Sold in 1966 to Transamar S.A., Lima, Peru. Sold to Spanish shipbreakers in November 1966. Ran aground on the Banjaard Sand, in the North Sea (51°41′N 3°32′W) on 2 December 1966 after breaking free from the tug that was towing her. Refloated on 4 December and taken in to Vlissingen, Netherlands. Voyage recommenced 9 December. Scrapped at Santander in January 1967.

== Alexander Graham Bell ==
Alexander Graham Bell was built by Oregon Shipbuilding Corporation. Her keel was laid on 17 September. She was launched on 18 October and delivered on 27 October. Built for the WSA, she was operated under the management of Weyerhauser Steamship Co. She was scrapped at Philadelphia in August 1962.

== Alexander Hamilton ==
Alexander Hamilton was built by Oregon Ship Building Corporation. Her keel was laid on 20 September 1941. She was launched on 28 December and delivered on 10 March 1942. She was scrapped at Seattle in May 1962.

== Alexander H. Stephens ==
Alexander H. Stephens was built by Alabama Drydock Company. She was launched on 23 July 1942. Laid up at Beaumont post-war, she was scrapped at Brownsville in October 1973.

== Alexander J. Dallas ==
Alexander J. Dallas was built by Oregon Ship Building Corporation. She was completed in January 1943. She was scrapped at Tacoma in 1966.

== Alexander Lillington ==
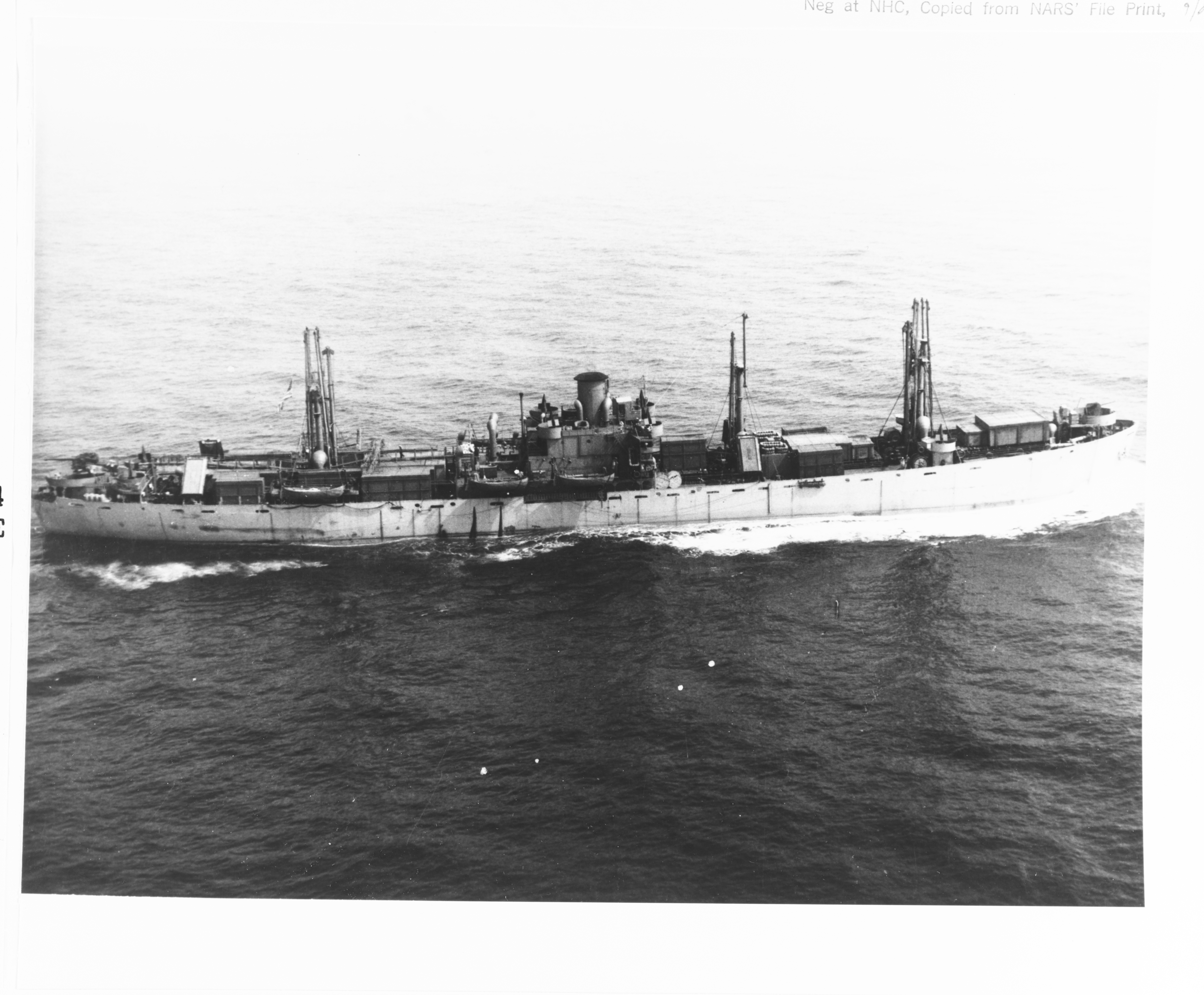
Alexander Lillington

Alexander Lillington was built by North Carolina Shipbuilding Company. Her keel was laid on 2 November 1942. She was launched on 6 December and delivered on 20 December. She was scrapped at Hamburg in January 1961.

== Alexander Macomb ==
Alexander Macomb was built by Bethlehem Fairfield Shipyard. Her keel was laid on 18 February 1942. She was launched on 6 May and delivered on 2 June. Built for the WSA, she was operated under the management of A. H. Bull & Co. Torpedoed and sunk in the Atlantic Ocean (41°48′N 66°35′W) by U-215 on 3 July 1942 whilst on a voyage from New York to Arkhangelsk, Soviet Union.

== Alexander Majors ==
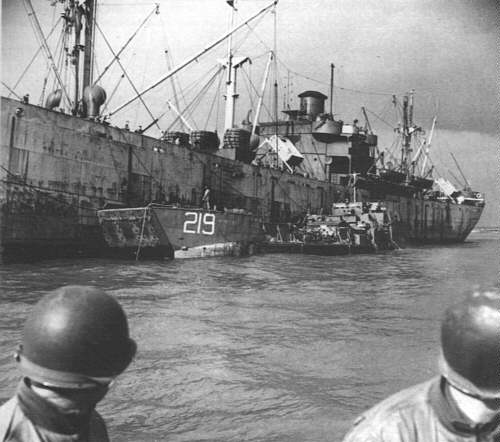
Alexander Majors

Alexander Majors was built by Permanente Metals Corporation. Her keel was laid on 27 December 1943. She was launched on 20 January 1944 and delivered on 4 March. Built for the WSA, she was operated under the management of Isthmian Steamship Co. On 12 November 1944, she was struck by a kamikaze attack off Leyte, Philippines and set afire. The forepart of the ship was severely damaged. She was repaired at San Francisco and returned to service. Sold in 1947 to Società di Navigazione Italia, Genoa and renamed Tritone. Sold in 1950 to Italia Società per Azioni di Navigazione, Genoa. Laid up at Trieste in 1972. Scrapped at Vado Ligure, Italy, in February 1973.

== Alexander Mitchell ==
Alexander Mitchell was built by Permanente Metals Corporation. Her keel was laid on 16 November 1943. She was launched on 6 December and delivered on 14 December. Built for the WSA, she was operated under the management of J. H. Winchester & Co. Sold in 1947 to Lauro & Montella, Naples, Italy and renamed Sirena. Sold in 1960 to Compagnia Balniera Italiana. Operated under the management of Fratelli D'Amico. Scrapped at Trieste in April 1967.

== Alexander Ramsey ==
Alexander Ramsey was built by Permanente Metals Corporation. Her keel was laid on 24 October 1942. She was launched on 1 December and delivered on 10 December. Laid up in the James River post-war. She was scuttled 3 nautical miles (5.6 km) off Wrightsville Beach, North Carolina on 26 August 1974.

== Alexander R. Sheperd ==
Alexander R. Sheperd was built by Southeastern Shipbuilding Corporation. Her keel was laid on 16 June 1944. She was launched on 3 August and delivered on 18 August. She was scrapped at Philadelphia in June 1965.

== Alexander S. Clay ==
Alexander S. Clay was built by J. A. Jones Construction Company, Brunswick. Her keel was laid on 15 May 1944. She was launched on 30 June and delivered on 15 July. Built for the WSA, she was operated under the management of South Atlantic Steamship Line. She was scrapped at New Orleans in January 1970.

== Alexander V. Fraser ==
Alexander V. Fraser was built by Bethlehem Fairfield Shipyard. Her keel was laid on 19 July 1944. She was launched on 22 August and delivered on 31 August. Built for the WSA, she was operated under the management of Pope & Talbot Inc. Management transferred to American Pacific Steamship Co. in 1946. Sold later that year to Calmar Steamship Company and renamed Massmar. Sold in 1955 to Bethlehem Steel Corp. Returned to the United States Government in 1964 in exchange for a Type C4-class ship and laid up in the James River. Scrapped at Wilmington, North Carolina in April 1972.

== Alexander W. Doniphan ==
Alexander W. Doniphan was built by Delta Shipbuilding Company. Her keel was laid on 28 March 1944. She was launched on 15 May and delivered on 5 July. She was scrapped at Philadelphia in 1964.

== Alexander White ==
Alexander White was built by Delta Shipbuilding Company. She was completed in December 1942. She was scrapped at Portland, Oregon in August 1964.

== Alexander Wilson ==
Alexander Wilson was built by Permanente Metals Corporation. Her keel was laid on 13 November 1943. She was launched on 2 December and delivered on 10 December. Built for the WSA, She was operated under the management of United States Lines. Sold in 1947 to Theofano Maritime Co., Greece and renamed Alfios. Operated under the management of N. G. Livanos. On 5 April 1952, she struck the wreck of Kontum off Saigon, French Indo-China (10°20′N 103°03′E), broke in two and sank. She was on a voyage from Dunkirk, France to Saigon. The stern section was refloated in March 1954, towed to Hong Kong and scrapped.

== Alexander Woolcott ==
Alexander Woolcott was built by Permanente Metals Corporation. Her keel was laid on 8 April 1944. She was launched on 27 April and delivered on 4 May. She was scrapped at Tacoma in August 1963.

== Alfred C. True ==
Alfred C. True was built by Permanente Metals Corporation. Her keel was laid on 24 December 1943. She was launched on 15 January 1944 and delivered on 21 January. Built for the WSA, she was operated under the management of Interocean Steamship Corp. Transferred to the United States War Department in 1946. Sold in 1947 to Società Italiana di Armamente "Sidarma", Venice and renamed Francesco Barbarano. Sold in 1949 to A. M. Piaggio & R. Bruzzo, Genoa and renamed Luisiana. Sold in 1960 to Ausonia di Navigazione dei Fratelli Ravano di Albert, Genoa and renamed Serenitas. Sold in 1961 to Hermes Corp. Renamed Arkas and reflagged to Liberia. Operated under the management of A. S. Seferiades. Management transferred to Metrofin Ltd. in 1968. Scrapped at Trieste in April 1970.

== Alfred E. Smith ==
Alfred E. Smith was built by New England Shipbuilding Corporation. Her keel was laid on 27 November 1944. She was launched on 17 January 1945 and delivered on 29 January. Built for the WSA, she was operated under the management of Moore-McCormack Lines. Management transferred to Lykes Brothers Steamship Company in 1946. Sold in 1949 to Eagle Ocean Transport Corp., New Yoak and renamed Mother M. L. Sold in 1955 to Altamira Compania Navigation, Panama and renamed Captain Lyras. Operated under the management of G. Lemos. Sold in 1957 to Hanover Steamship Corp. and renamed Ocean Chief. Reflagged to Liberia and operated under the management of Jason Steamship Co. Sold in 1963 to China Union Lines and renamed Union Transport. Flagged to China but reflagged to Taiwan in 1965. Scrapped at Kaohsiung in March 1970.

== Alfred I. Dupont ==
Alfred I. Dupont was built by St Johns River Shipbuilding Corporation. Her keel was laid on 1 July 1944. She was launched on 15 August and delivered on 28 August. Laid up post-war at Mobile, she was scrapped at New Orleans in May 1970.

== Alfred J. Evans ==
Alfred J. Evans was built by Delta Shipbuilding Company. Her keel was laid on 19 July 1944. She was launched on 28 August and delivered on 17 October. Laid up post-war at Brownsville, She was scrapped at Brownsville in October 1971.

== Alfred L. Baxlay ==
Alfred L. Baxlay was built by Walsh-Kaiser Company, Providence, Rhode Island. She was completed as Lektor Garbo in February 1945. Sold to D/S A/S Theologos, Haugesund, Norway. Operated under the management of Nils Rogenaes. Renamed N. O. Rogenaes in 1947. She collided with the Dutch ship Prins Alexander in the English Channel on 10 July 1952. Prins Alexander was towed in to Dover, United Kingdom. Sold in 1960 to Namdal Shipping & Trading Co. and renamed Kalu. Reflagged to Liberia and placed under the management of Carl Anne & Compania. Sold in 1961 to Compania Navegacão e Comercio Pan-American, Rio de Janeiro. Scrapped in Brazil in April 1973.

== Alfred Moore ==
Alfred Moore was built by North Carolina Shipbuilding Company. Her keel was laid on 24 January 1943. She was launched on 22 February and delivered on 2 March. She was scrapped at Bremerhaven, West Germany in February 1961.

== Alice F. Palmer ==
Alice F. Palmer was built by California Shipbuilding Corporation. Her keel was laid on 12 February 1943. She was launched on 12 March and delivered on 28 March. Torpedoed and sunk in the Mozambique Channel (26°30′S 44°20′E) by U-177 on 10 July 1943 whilst on a voyage from Calcutta to Durban, Union of South Africa.

== Alice H. Rice ==
Alice H. Rice was built by Permanente Metals Corporation. Her keel was laid on 6 January 1944. She was launched on 24 January and delivered on 31 January. She was driven ashore on the Kinabatangan Reef on 23 August 1945 whilst on a voyage from Los Angeles to Lingayan, Philippines. She was refloated on 16 September and taken in to Lingayan for temporary repairs. Subsequently, laid up in Suisun Bay. Declared a constructive total loss, she was scrapped at Terminal Island in October 1947.

== Allegan ==
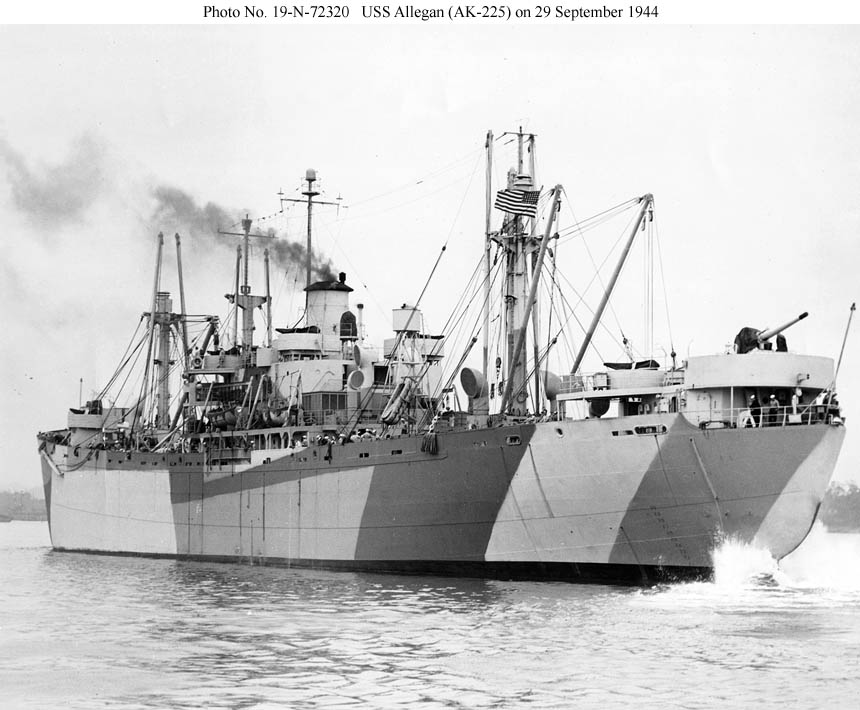
USS Allegan

Allegan was built by Bethlehem Fairfield Shipyard. Her keel was laid on 21 December 1943. She was launched as Van Lear Black on 21 January 1944 and delivered on 31 January 1944. To United States Navy in August 1944 and renamed Allegan. Returned to WSA in November 1945. Renamed Van Lear Black and laid up. Sold in 1947 to Compania de Navigation San Leonardo, Panama and renamed San Leonardo. Operated under the management of Fordom Trading Co. Management transferred to Mar-Trade Corp. in 1949. She lost her propeller 37 nautical miles (69 km) south of Cape Northumberland, South Australia on 18 February 1951. San Leonardo was towed in to Melbourne by the British steamship Waimana. Sold that year to Society Navigation Interamericana, Panama and renamed Wanderer. Operated under the management of Western Shipping Corp. Sold in 1955 to La Guayra Compania Navigation, Panama. Operated under the management of S. G. Embiricos. Reflagged to Liberia in 1956. Sold in 1959 to Force Steamship Corp. and renamed Valiant Force, flying the American flag. Operated under the management of Ocean Carriers Corp. Sold in 1963 to Potomac Steamship Corp., New York and renamed Wanderer. Reflagged to Liberia. Renamed Wanderlust later that year. Sold in 1964 to Macedonian Steamship Corp. Operated under the management of Dynamic Shipping Inc. Scrapped at Onomichi, Japan in October 1969.

== Allen C. Balch ==
Allen C. Balch was built by California Shipbuilding Corporation. Her keel was laid on 21 December 1943. She was launched on 17 January 1944 and delivered on 2 February. Built for the WSA, she was operated under the management of American President Lines. Management transferred to Pacific-Atlantic Steamship Company in 1947, then Pope & Talbot Inc., in 1950. Sold in 1951 to Ocean Shipping Inc., New York and renamed Ocean Seaman. Sold in 1960 to Musas Compania Navigation, Panama. Renamed Theia Maria, reflagged to Greece and operated under the management of Global Navigation Co. Ran aground near Punta Galera, Mexico (15°57′N 97°46′W) on 14 April 1961 whilst on a voyage from Demerara to a Japanese port. She broke in two and was declared a constructive total loss. Scrapped in situ.

== Allen G. Collins ==
Allen G. Collins was built by New England Shipbuilding Corporation. Her keel was laid on 29 March 1945. She was launched on 22 May and delivered on 2 June. To France under Lend-Lease. Sold in 1947 to the French Government and renamed Lyon. Operated under the management of Compagnie de Navigation d'Orbigny. Sold in 1954 to Diego Compania Armamente, Panama and renamed Basil II. Reflagged to Liberia and operated under the management of Coulouthros Ltd. Sold in 1963 to Reliance Marine Corp., Panama and renamed Ever Prosperity. Remained under the Liberian flag and operated under the management of Chinese Maritime Trust. Ran aground on the Isie Reef, off the western coast of New Caledonia on 26 February 1965 whilst on a voyage from Miike, Japan to a port in New Caledonia. She was a total loss.

== Allen Johnson ==
Allen Johnson was built by Permanente Metals Corporation. Her keel was laid on 30 January 1944. She was launched on 18 February and delivered on 26 February. She was scrapped at Seattle in November 1958.

== Amasa Delano ==
Amasa Delano was built by Delta Shipbuilding Company. Her keel was laid on 31 March 1944. She was launched on 16 May and delivered on 6 July. Built for the WSA, she was operated under the management of A. L. Burbank & Co. She was laid up in the Hudson River in 1948. Sold in 1951 to Strathmore Shipping Co., New York and renamed Strathport. Sold in 1954 to Compania Fletera Cajotamil, Panama and renamed Elpis. Reflagged to Libera and placed under the management of Trans-Ocean Steamship Agency. Rebuilt at Kobe in 1956, now 511 feet 6 inches (155.91 m) long and 8,541 GRT. Reflagged to Greece in 1960. Renamed Elpis II in 1966 and reflagged to Liberia. Sold in 1967 to Aris Shipping & Trading Corp. and renamed Ari K.. Operated under the management of Pacific Steamship Agency. Scrapped at Onomichi in December 1968.

== Ambrose Bierce ==
Ambrose Bierce was built by Permanente Metals Corporation. Her keel was laid on 10 June 1943. She was launched on 9 July and delivered on 22 July. She was scrapped at Oakland in October 1958.

== Ambrose E. Burnside ==
Ambrose E. Burnside was built by Permanente Metals Corporation. Her keel was laid on 15 July 1942. She was launched on 4 September and delivered on 16 September. She was scrapped at Wilmington, North Carolina in December 1965.

== Amelia Earhart ==
Amelia Earhart was built by Todd Houston Shipbuilding Corporation. Her keel was laid on 19 October 1942. She was launched on 18 December and delivered on 31 December. Built for the WSA, she was operated under the management of Merchants & Miners Transport Corp. Management had been transferred to Lykes Bros. by 1948. Driven ashore on Borneo (2°47′N 108°36′E) on 10 November 1948 whilst on a voyage from Nagoya, Japan to Mobile. She was refloated on 20 November and towed to Singapore, where she was declared a constructive total loss. She was repaired at Hong Kong. Sold in 1950 to Far Eastern & Panama Transport Corp., Panama and renamed Modena. Operated under the management of Wheelock, Marden & Co. Sold to the Polish Government in 1951 and renamed Przyszlosc. Operated under the management of Polish Ocean Lines. Sold in 1965 to China Ocean Shipping Company, Peking, China and renamed Jiading. Deleted from Lloyd's Register in 1978.

== American Mariner ==
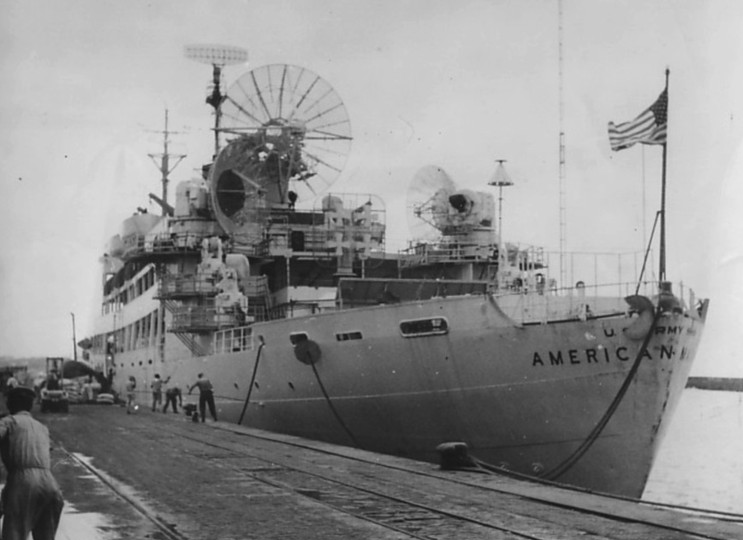
USAS American Mariner

American Mariner was built by Bethlehem Fairfield Shipyard. Her keel was laid on 15 August 1941. She was launched on 30 December and delivered on 12 February 1942. She was launched as George Calvert and completed as American Mariner for the United States Coast Guard Maritime Training Service. She was later transferred to the United States Army, then the United States Army Air Force. In 1961, she was converted to a Missile Range Ship at Brooklyn, New York. To United States Navy on 1 July 1964. Stricken on 1 July 1967. Scuttled as a target ship in Chesapeake Bay in October 1966.

== Amerigo Vespucci ==
Amerigo Vespucci was built by Permanente Metals Corporation. Her keel was laid on 20 February 1944. She was launched on 10 March and delivered on 18 March. She was scrapped at Portland, Oregon in January 1962.

== Ameriki ==
Ameriki was built by New England Shipbuilding Corporation. Her keel was laid on 2 August 1943. She was launched on as William H. Todd on 19 September and delivered as Ameriki on 30 September. To the Greek Government under Lend-Lease. Sold in 1948 to Marathon Steamship Co., Piraeus. Sold in 1956 to Society Anonyme of Maritime Enterprises, Panama and renamed Ellinis, remaining under the Greek flag. Placed under the management of J. C. Carras in 1965. She was scrapped at Sakai, Japan in 1967.

== A. Mitchell Palmer ==
A. Mitchell Palmer was built by Southeastern Shipbuilding Corporation. Her keel was laid on 17 December 1943. She was launched on 13 February 1944 and delivered on 29 February. Built for the WSA, she was operated under the management of Isbrandtsen Steamship Company. Sold in 1947 to Suwanee Fruit & Steamship Corp., Jacksonville, Florida. Sold in 1951 to Honduras Shipping Co., Tegucigalpa, Honduras. Sold later that year to Compania de Navigation Las Cruces, Panama and renamed Waimea. Operated under the management of Carras Ltd. Sold in 1954 to Santa Anna Corp. and renamed Annitsa A., remaining under the flag of Honduras and the same management. Management transferred to Angelos, Leitch & Co. in 1956, then Angelos & Co. in 1957. Sold in 1964 to Compania Navigation Pearl, Panama. Renamed Justice and reflagged to Liberia. Operated under the management of Ten Hu Steamship Co. Sold in 1966 to Ideal United Steamship Corp., Liberia. Operated under the management of Tai An Steamship Co. Scrapped at Kaohsiung in May 1968.

== Am-Mer-Mar ==
Am-Mer-Mar was built by Delta Shipbuilding Company. Her keel was laid on 3 August 1944. She was launched on 14 September and delivered on 25 October. She was driven ashore near Lindesnes, Norway, on 27 December 1946 whilst on a voyage from New Orleans to Larvik, Norway. She floated off and sank on 1 January 1947. The wreck was sold in March 1948 to the Stavanger Shipbreaking Co.

== Ammla ==
Ammla was built by Bethlehem Fairfield Shipyard. Her keel was laid on 12 November 1943. She was launched on 3 December and delivered on 13 December. She was completed as Samvard. To MoWT under Lend-Lease and placed under the management of William Thompson & Co. Renamed Ammla in 1944. Sold in 1947 to Ben Line and renamed Benarty, remaining under the same management. Sold in 1954 to Isla Grande Compania Navigation, Panama and renamed Creator. Reflagged to Liberia and placed under the management of D. Prateras Ltd. Renamed Treis Ierarcha in 1960 and reflagged to Greece. Sold in 1963 to Darien Compania Navigation, Panama and renamed Captain G., remaining under the Greek flag. Sold to shipbreakers in Shanghai, China in 1968. Foundered in a typhoon 60 nautical miles (110 km) south of Hong Kong (approximately 22°24′N 114°55′E) on 21 August whilst on a voyage from Kosseir to Shanghai.

== Amos G. Throop ==
Amos G. Throop was built by California Shipbuilding Corporation. Her keel was laid on 30 October 1942. She was launched on 28 November and delivered on 19 December. She was scrapped at Oakland in February 1968.

== Amos Kendall ==
Amos Kendall was built by Oregon Shipbuilding Corporation. Her keel was laid on 13 February 1943. She was launched on 7 March and delivered on 17 March. She was scrapped at Baltimore in May 1961.

== Amy Lowell ==
Amy Lowell was built by California Shipbuilding Corporation. Her keel was laid on 28 February 1943. She was launched on 27 March and delivered on 10 April. Built for the WSA, she was operated under the management of Seas Shipping Co. Sold in 1947 to Det Forende D/S A/S, Copenhagen, Denmark and renamed Nevada. Sold in 1959 to White Sea Maritime Ltd and renamed White Sea. Reflagged to Liberia and operated under the management of S. Livanos. Sold in 1960 to United White Shipping Co., remaining under the same management. Scrapped at Kaohsiung in 1967.

== Ancil F. Haines ==
Ancil F. Haines was built by Delta Shipbuilding Company. Her keel was laid on 10 July 1944. She was launched on 21 August and delivered on 2 October. Built for the WSA, she was operated under the management of Wessel, Duval & Co. Transferred to United States War Department in 1946 and lent to the Chinese Government. Sold later that year to China Merchants Steam Navigation Company and renamed Hai Sui. Reflagged to Taiwan in 1949. Sold in 1964 to Chi Yuen Navigation Co., Taipei, Taiwan and renamed Wu Chang. Renamed Wuchang in 1965. Scrapped at Kaohsiung in May 1967.

== Andreas Honcharenko ==
Andreas Honcharenko was built by Delta Shipbuilding Company. Her keel was laid on 7 November 1944. She was launched on 11 December and delivered on 31 December. Built for the WSA, she was operated under the management of De La Rama Steamship Company, Inc. Transferred to the United States War Department in 1946. Sold in 1947 to Mount Steamship Co., New York and renamed Alabaman. Operated under the management of American-Hawaiian Steamship Company. Sold to her managers in 1949, then sold in 1952 to Coral Steamship Co. and renamed Seacliff. Sold in 1954 to Seven Seas Steamship Corp., New York. Sold in 1956 to Liberty Navigation and Trading Co., New York and renamed Josefina. Operated under the management of J. H. Winchester & Co. Sold in 1965 to Panoceanic Tankers Corp. Operated under the management of Spiros Polemis Sons. Sold in 1966 to Viafel Compania Navigation Panama and renamed Cindy. Reflagged to Liberia but remained under the same management. Caught fire off Kobe on 7 December 1966 whilst on a voyage from Mormugao, India to Amagasaki, Japan. Towed to Sumoto and beached on Awaji Island. Refloated on 16 December and towed in to Amagasaki, where she was declared a constructive total loss. Scrapped at Hirao in March 1967.

== Andres Almonaster ==
Andres Almonaster was built by Delta Shipbuilding Company. Her keel was laid on 10 January 1044. She was launched on 19 February. She was completed by Todd-Galveston Drydock Co., Houston, in March 1944 as Syrma for the United States Navy, and delivered on 20 March. To the WSA in 1946 and renamed Andres Almonaster. Laid up in reserve. Sold in 1948 to Compania de Navigation San Leonardo, Panama and renamed San Jorge. Operated under the management of Fordom Trading Co. Management changed to Mar Trade Corp. in 1949. Sold in 1950 to Compania Maritime Ganges, Panama. Operated under the management of Lyras Bros. She was attacked by Chinese nationalist troops off Foochow in October 1951. A crew member was injured. Sold in 1954 to St. John Shipping Corp., Panama and renamed St. John, remaining under the same management. Sold in 1961 to Classic Shipping Corp., and reflagged to Lebanon, still under the same managers. Scrapped at Shanghai in January 1968.

== Andrew A. Humphreys ==
Andrew A. Humphreys was a tanker built by Delta Shipbuilding Company. Her keel was laid on 8 August 1943. She was launched on 25 September and delivered on 15 November. Built for the WSA, she was operated under the management of International Freighting Corp. Management transferred to Keystone Shipping Corp. in 1946. Sold in 1948 to Charles Kurz & Co, remaining under the same management. Sold in 1954 to Seatankers Inc. and reflagged to Liberia. Rebuilt at Kobe to a cargo ship. Now 511 feet 6 inches (155.91 m) long and 8,615 GRT. Renamed William R. Tolbert. Sold in 1961 to Hanover Steamship Corp. and renamed Ocean Leader. Operated under the management of Jason Steamship Co. Management transferred to Norland Shipping & Trading Co. in 1963, then Ocean Freighting & Brokerage Corp. in 1965. Scrapped at Onomichi in November 1969.

== Andrew Briscoe ==
Andrew Briscoe was built by Todd Houston Shipbuilding Corporation. Her keel was laid on 22 November 1943. She was launched on 8 January 1944 and delivered on 22 January. Built for the WSA, she was operated under the management of Moore-McCormack Lines. Sold in 1947 to George W. Motsas, Crete and renamed Crete. Sold in 1950 to Andros Steamship Co., Piraeus. Placed under the management of Western Shipping Corp. in 1954. Management transferred to S. G. Embiricos in 1956. Sold in 1961 to C. Bogiazides, remaining under the same management. Scrapped at Sakaide, Japan in February 1969.

== Andrew Carnegie ==
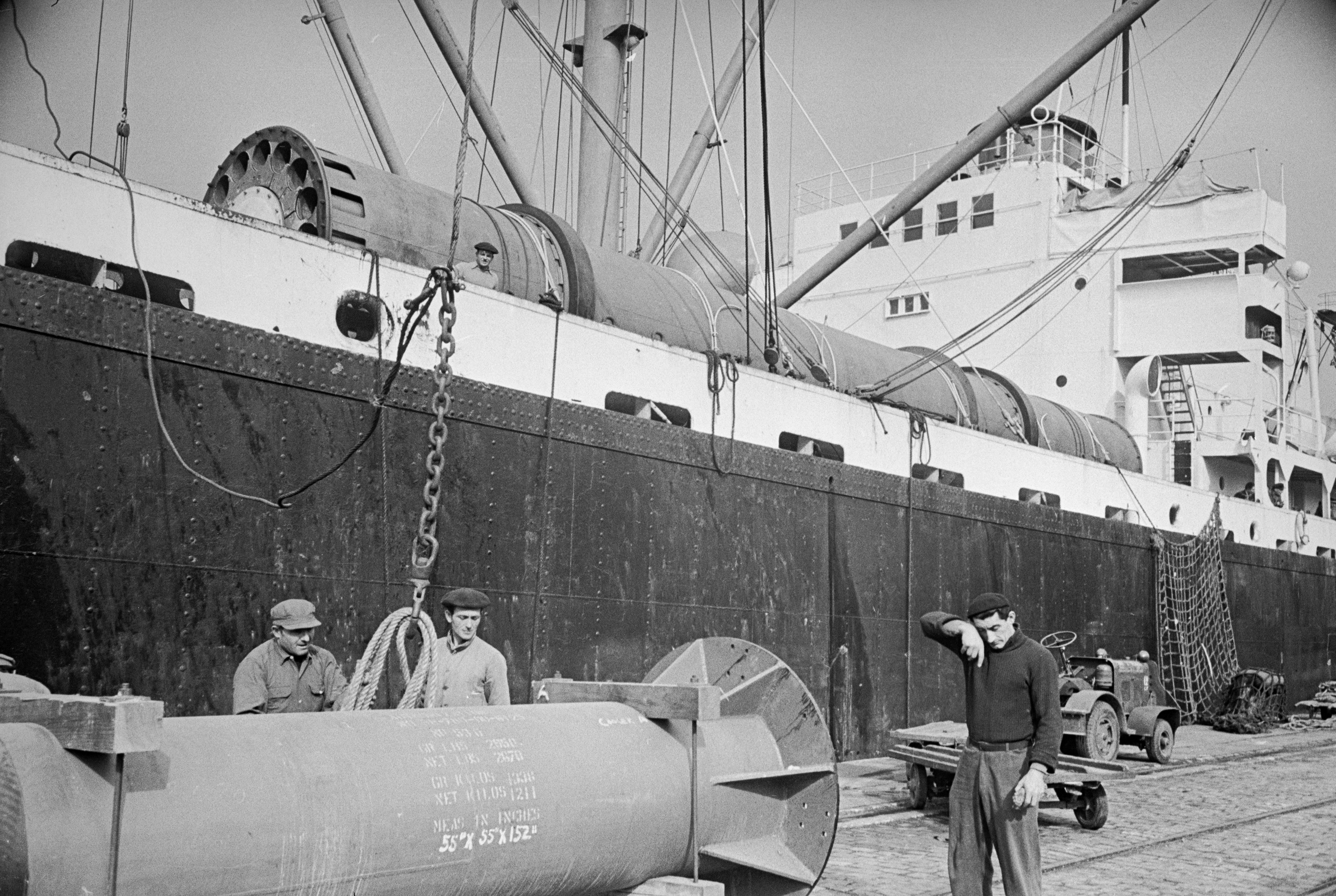
Bastia

Andrew Carnegie was built by Oregon Shipbuilding Corporation. Her keel was laid on 27 July 1942. She was launched on 3 September and delivered on 13 September. Built for the WSA, she was operated under the management of American President Line. To French Government in 1947 and renamed Bastia. Operated under the management of Compagnie de Navigation Fraissinet. Laid up at Toulon, France in 1962. Scrapped at La Seyne-sur-Mer in October 1963.

== Andrew D. White ==
Andrew D. White was built by Marinship Corporation, Sausalito, California. Her keel was laid on 23 November 1942. She was launched on 28 January 1943 and delivered on 27 February. She was scrapped at Portland, Oregon in 1962.

== Andrew Furuseth ==
Andrew Furuseth was built by Permanente Metals Corporation. Her keel was laid on 22 July 1942. She was launched on 7 September and delivered on 8 October. Built for the WSA, she was operated under the management of Matson Navigation Co. Sold in 1946 to Skibs A/S Essi, Oslo and renamed Essi. Operated under the management of Bjorn Ruud-Pedersen. Sold in 1959 to Compania Oceanica de Navigation, Panama and renamed Niobe. Operated under the Greek flag and the management of D. J. Negroponte. She collided with a Japanese fishing vessel on 21 February 1960. The fishing vessel sank with the loss of two of her sixteen crew. Niobe rescued ten survivors; the other four were listed as missing. Scrapped at Hirao in June 1967.

== Andrew G. Curtin ==
Andrew G. Curtin was built by Bethlehem Fairfield Shipyard. Her keel was laid on 9 December 1942. She was launched on 18 January 1943 and delivered on 31 January. Built for the WSA, she was operated under the management of Calmar Steamship Company. Torpedoed and sunk in the Barents Sea (73°25′N 25°16′E) by U-716 on 25 January 1944 whilst on a voyage from New York to Murmansk, Soviet Union.

== Andrew Hamilton ==
Andrew Hamilton was built by Bethlehem Fairfield Shipyard. Her keel was laid on 15 June 1942. She was launched on 6 August and delivered on 17 August. She was scrapped at Wilmington, Delaware in May 1962.

== Andrew J. Newbury ==
Andrew J.Newbury, probably in Belgium

Andrew J. Newbury was built by New England Shipbuilding Corporation. Her keel was laid on 22 May 1944. She was launched on 12 July and delivered on 26 July. To United States Navy in 1955. Converted to a Mobile Auxiliary Ship and laid up at Mobile. Scrapped at Panama City, Florida in December 1973.

== Andrew Marschalk ==
Andrew Marschalk was a tanker built by Delta Shipbuilding Corporation. Her keel was laid on 9 June 1943. She was launched on 7 August and delivered on 6 October. Built for the WSA, she was operated under the management of American Republics Corporation. Sold in 1948 to Flanigan, Loveland Shipping Co. Operated under the management of Compania Alfaro SA. Sold later that year to Philadelphia Marine Corp, Dover, Delaware. Sold in 1950 to Jupiter Steamship Co. and renamed Seaglorious. Operated under the management of Orion Shipping & Trading Co. Reflagged to Panama in 1954. Converted to a cargo ship at Schiedam, Netherlands in 1955. Lengthened at Maizuru, Japan in 1956, now 511 feet 6 inches (155.91 m) long and 8,692 GRT. An ore carrier, she was reflagged to Liberia. Sold in 1957 to Panoceanic Compania Marina, Panama and renamed Andros Glider, remaining under the Liberian flag and the same management. Sold in 1960 to Pioneer Mariners Corp and renamed Evrotas. Reflagged to Greece but still under the management of Orion. Sold in 1962 to Kini Compania Maritima, Panama and renamed Kini. Still under the Greek flag, but now under the management of Trans-Ocean Steamship Agency. Sold in 1965 to Adrian Maritime Co. and renamed Three Sisters. Reflagged to Liberia and placed under the management of Astoria Steamship Agency. Management transferred to Atlantic Shipping Co. in 1967. Sold in 1968 to Ivory Coast Transport Corp. and renamed Kriti. Operated under the management of Commodity Chartering Corp. Sold in 1973 to Vall Carriers Ltd. and renamed Vall Sun. Operated under the management of Intrafirma Ship Management. Scrapped at Kaohsiung in April 1974.

== Andrew Moore ==
Andrew Moore was built by Delta Shipbuilding Company. Her keel was laid on 16 June 1942. She was launched on 7 September and delivered on 11 October. She was scrapped at Philadelphia in March 1963.

== Andrew Pickens ==
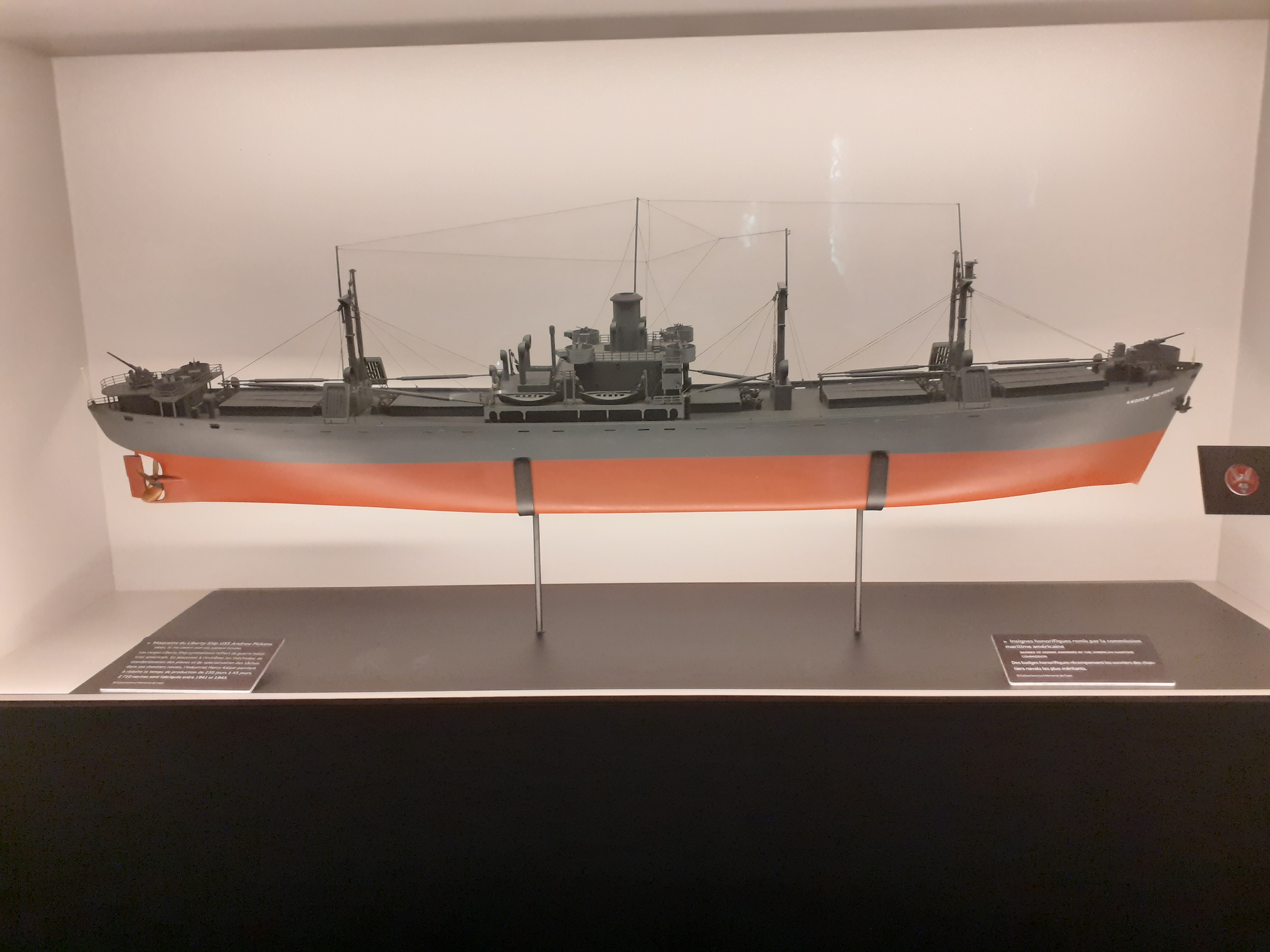
Model of Andrew Pickens

Andrew Pickens was built by Southeastern Shipbuilding Corporation. Her keel was laid on 3 May 1943. She was launched on 10 July and delivered on 5 August. Built for the WSA, she was operated under the management of South Atlantic Steamship Line. To the French Government in 1946 and renamed Caen. Operated under the management of Société Navigation Caennaise. She collided with a floating wreck in the Atlantic Ocean 180 nautical miles (330 km) off Cape May, United States on 18 October 1949 and lost her propeller. USCGC Campbell was sent to her assistance. Campbell took Caen in tow, but the tow line subsequently broke. Sold in 1961 to ZIM-Israel Navigation Co., Haifa, Israel and renamed Fenice. New diesel engine fitted at Nantes, France by Ateliers et Chantiers de Bretagne. Sold in 1964 to Pagan Steamship Corp., Nassau, Bahamas. Reflagged to the United Kingdom. Sold in 1967 to Marcalibre Compania Navigation, Panama. Operated under the management of Pateras Bros. Sold in 1970 to Arendal Shipping Co., Cyprus and renamed Arendal, remaining under the same management. Scrapped at Bilbao, Spain in May 1972.

== Andrew Rowan ==
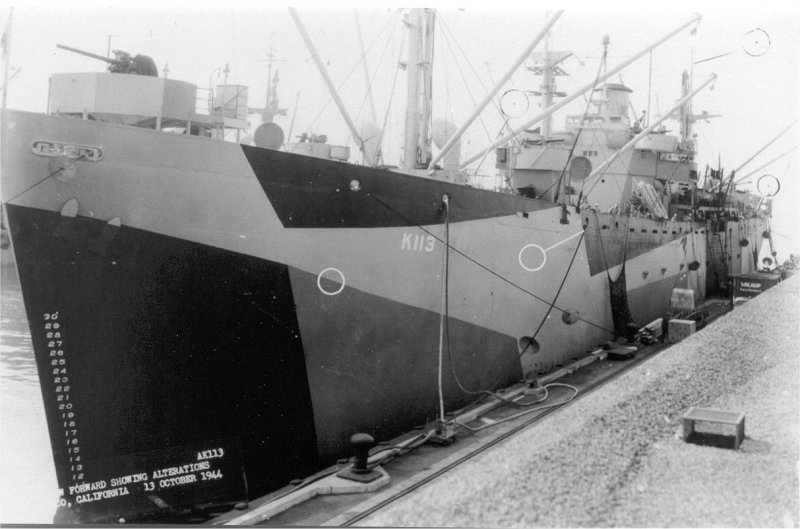
USS Rutilicus

Andrew Rowan was built by California Shipbuilding Corporation. Her keel was laid on 2 April 1943. She was launched on 26 April and delivered on 8 May. To United States Navy in October 1943 and renamed Rutilicus. Returned to WSA in December 1945 and renamed Andrew Rowan. Laid up in the James River, she was scrapped at Gandia in February 1972.

== Andrew Stevenson ==
Andrew Stevenson was built by Delta Shipbuilding Company. Her keel was laid on 21 February 1944. She was launched on 5 April and delivered on 19 May. Laid up in reserve at Beaumont post-war, she was scrapped at Cleveland, Ohio in September 1972.

== Andrew T. Huntington ==
Andrew T. Huntington was built by California Shipbuilding Corporation. Her keel was laid on 16 May 1943. She was launched on 8 June and delivered on 20 June. Built for the WSA, she was operated under the management of American President Lines. To the Dutch Government in 1947 and renamed Lorentz. Chartered later that year to Vereenigde Nederlandsche Scheepvaarts Maatschappij (VNSM), Den Haag and renamed Lindekerk. Sold in 1950 to Nederland NV Stoomvaart Maatschappij, Amsterdam. Sold in 1951 to VNSM . Sold in 1961 to Maritza Compania Navigation, Panama and renamed Maritsa. Reflagged to Lebanon and placed under the management of Troodos Shipping Co. Sold in 1966 to Compania de Navigation Para Viajes Mondiales and renamed Efdromos. Reflagged to Greece and operated under the management of Victoria Steamship Co. Ran aground at Porto Alexandre, Angola (15°47′S 11°49′E) on 29 May 1970 whilst on a voyage from Ancona, Italy to Shanghai. She broke in two and was abandoned as a total loss.

== Andrew Turnbull ==
Andrew Turnbull was built by St. Johns River Shipbuilding Company, Jacksonville, Florida. Her keel was laid on 15 December 1943. She was launched on 8 February 1944 and delivered on 19 February. She was scrapped at Portland, Oregon in June 1968.

== Andrew W. Preston ==
Andrew W. Preston was built by Todd Houston Shipbuilding Corporation. Her keel was laid on 9 May 1944. She was launched on 12 June and delivered on 21 June. Built for the WSA, she was operated under the management of United Fruit Company. Laid up at Lee Hall, Virginia in 1945, she was returned to service in 1947. Laid up in the Hudson River in 1948. Sold in 1951 to Blidberg Rothchild Company, New York and renamed Northport. Sold in 1957 to Compania Maritime Columbell, Panama and renamed Abalone. Placed under the flag of Liberia. Lengthened at Tokyo, Japan in 1961, now 511 feet 6 inches (155.91 m) long and 8,565 GRT. Sold in 1962 to Rexford Steamship Co. and renamed Norwalk. Reflagged to the United States and placed under the management of Blidberg Rothchild Company. Scrapped at Kaohsiung in September 1969.

== Angus McDonald ==
Angus McDonald was built by Todd Houston Shipbuilding Corporation. Her keel was laid on 5 June 1944. She was launched on 12 July and delivered on 23 July. She was scrapped at Seattle in October 1969.

== Anna Dickinson ==
Anna Dickinson was built by St. Johns River Shipbuilding Corporation. Her keel was laid on 26 July 1944. She was launched on 4 September and delivered on 16 September. She was scrapped at Panama City, Florida in June 1962.

== Anna H. Branch ==
Anna H. Branch was built by Todd Houston Shipbuilding Corporation. Her keel was laid on 19 January 1944. She was launched on 2 March and delivered on 15 March. Built for the WSA, she was operated under the management of Interocean Steamship Corporation. Sold in 1946 to Lorentzens Rederi A/S, Oslo and renamed Arthur R. Stove. Sold in 1955 to Costis Compania Maritima, Panama and renamed Kostis. Reflagged to Liberia. Placed under the management of Laimos Bros. in 1956. Reflagged to Greece in 1961. Ran aground in the Bissagos Islands, Portuguese Guinea (11°18′N 16°48′W) on 3 June 1968 whilst on a voyage from Sfax, Tunisia to a Chinese port. Caught fire, was gutted and abandoned. She subsequently broke up.

== Anna Howard Shaw ==
Anna Howard Shaw was built by New England Shipbuilding Corporation. Her keel was laid on 21 July 1943. She was launched on 31 August and delivered on 14 September. She was scrapped at Tacoma in May 1967.

== Anne Bradstreet ==
Anne Bradstreet was built by New England Shipbuilding Corporation. Her keel was laid on 6 October 1942. She was launched on 27 December and delivered on 18 January 1943. Built for the WSA, she was operated under the management of Agwilines Inc. To the French Government in 1947. Renamed La Pallice and placed under the management of Compagnie Delmas Vieljeux. She was scrapped at Hamburg in May 1969.

== Anne Hutchinson ==
Anne Hutchinson was built by Oregon Ship Building Corporation. Her keel was laid on 23 April 1942. She was launched on 31 May and delivered on 16 June. built for the WSA, she was operated under the management of Sudden & Christensen. She was torpedoed, shelled and damaged in the Indian Ocean off the coast of the Union of South Africa (33°10′S 28°30′E) by U-504 on 26 October 1942. She was taken in tow, but was split in two by explosive charges as the tug had insufficient power to tow her. The stern section sank. The bow section was towed in to Port Elizabeth. Presumed scrapped.

== Annie Oakley ==
Annie Oakley was built by California Shipbuilding Corporation. Her keel was laid on 21 August 1943. She was launched on 12 September and delivered as Samida on 25 September. To MoWT, operated under the management of Peninsular and Oriental Steam Navigation Company. Torpedoed and sunk in the English Channel 3 nautical miles (5.6 km) off Dungeness by a midget submarine on 9 April 1945 whilst on a voyage from Barry to Antwerp, Belgium. The wreck was subsequently dispersed by explosives.

== Ansel Briggs ==
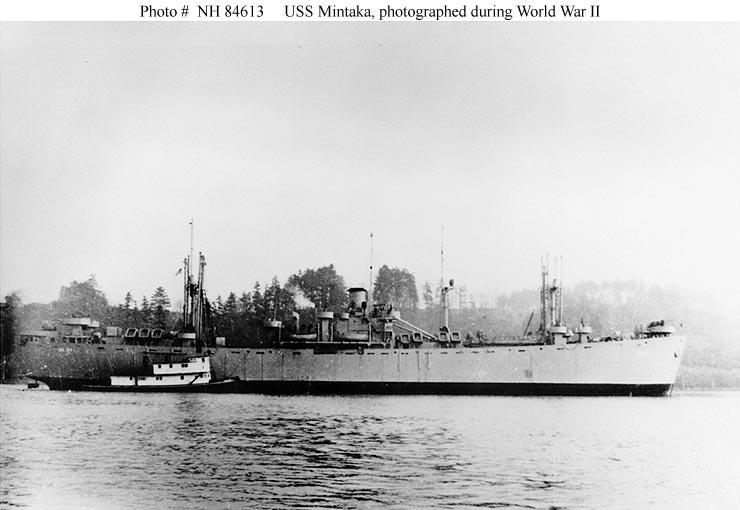
USS Mintaka

Ansel Briggs was built by California Shipbuilding Corporation. Her keel was laid on 9 February 1943. She was launched on 10 March and delivered as Mintaka for the United States Navy on 26 March. She was converted to a troopship at Portland, Oregon in November 1943. To WSA in February 1946, renamed Ansel Briggs. Laid up in Suisun Bay. She was scrapped at Oakland in April 1968.

== Anson Burlinghame ==
Anson Burlinghame was built by Permanente Metals Corporation. Her keel was laid on 27 March 1943. She was launched on 24 April and delivered on 9 May. Built for the WSA, she was operated under the management of Seas Shipping Co. Sold in 1947 to P. K. Lemos, Chios, Greece and renamed Kostis Lemos. Driven ashore on Camiguin Island, Philippines on 31 December 1950 whilst on a voyage from Vancouver, Canada to Bombay. She broke in two and was a total loss.

== Anson Jones ==
Anson Jones was built by Todd Houston Shipbuilding Corporation. Her keel was laid on 1 April 1943. She was launched on 14 May and delivered on 30 May. Built for the WSA, she was operated under the management of Isthmian Steamship Co. Management transferred to A. L. Burbank & Co. in 1946. Sold later that year to Anfartygs A/B Tirfing, Sweden and renamed Lappland. On 13 November 1949, she participated in the search for survivors from the Spanish ship Monte Gurugu, which had foundered off Lundy Island, United Kingdom. Sold in 1950 to Steamship Co. 1949 and renamed Caspiana. Placed under the flag of Liberia and the management of Isbrandtsen Co. Sold in 1951 to Society Naviera Panmar, Panama. Remained under the Liberian flag but place under the management of Goulandris Bros. Sold in 1954 to Palmyra Trading Corp. Reflagged to Greece in 1960. Scrapped at Shanghai in 1969.

== Anson Mills ==
Anson Mills was built by Todd Houston Shipbuilding Corporation. Her keel was laid on 9 September 1944. She was launched on 17 October and delivered on 27 October. Laid up in the Hudson River post-war, she was scrapped at Bilbao in January 1971.

== Anthony P. K. Stafford ==
Anthonhy P. K. Stafford was built by California Shipbuilding Corporation. She was completed in July 1943. She was scrapped at Kearny in December 1065.

== Anthony F. Lucas ==
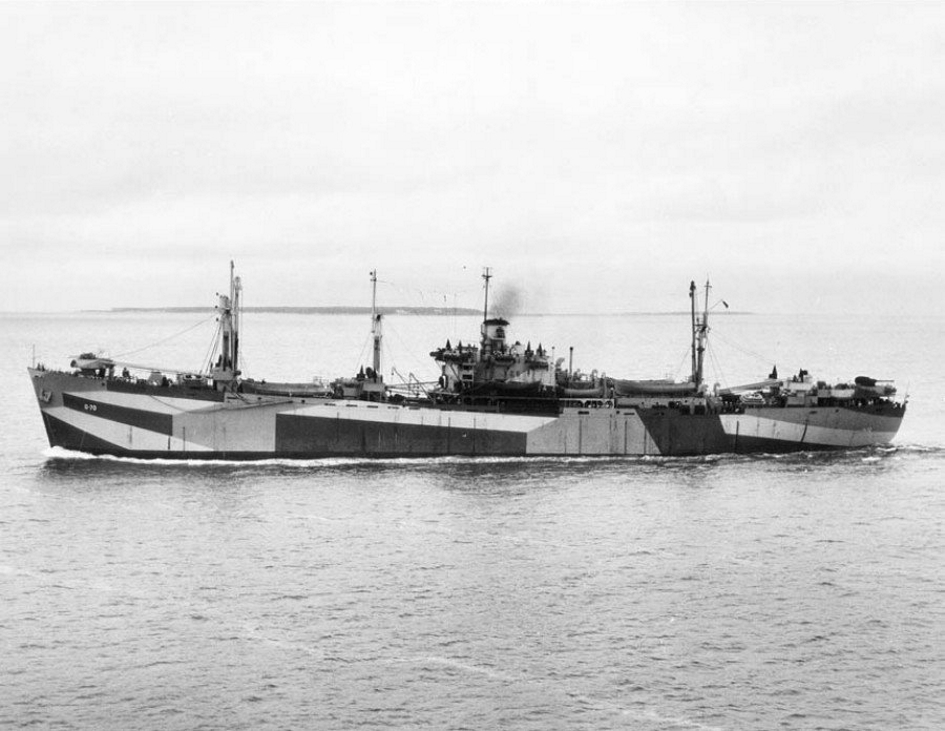
USS Zaniah

Anthony F. Lucas was built by Todd Houston Shipbuilding Corporation. Her keel was laid on 29 October 1943. She was launched on 12 December and delivered on 22 December. To United States Navy and renamed Zaniah. Converted to a stores, barracks and distilling ship by Alabama Drydock and Shipbuilding Company, Mobile in March 1944. Laid up in reserve at Pearl Harbor, Hawaii in April 1946. Towed to San Francisco in May 1947 and transferred to USMC. Laid up in reserve at Suisun Bay. Scrapped at Oakland in November 1961.

== Anthony Ravalli ==
Anthony Ravalli was built by Oregon Shipbuilding Corporation. Her keel was laid on 1 September 1943. She was launched on 16 September and delivered on 23 September. She was scrapped at Philadelphia in 1961.

== Anthony Wayne ==
Anthony Wayne was built by Permanente Metals Corporation. Her keel was laid on 6 October 1941. She was launched on 15 March 1942 and delivered on 23 April. She was scrapped at Baltimore in March 1960.

== Antoine Saugrain ==
Antoine Saugrain was built by Permanente Metals Corporations. Her keel was laid on 26 July 1943. She was launched on 15 August and delivered on 28 August. Built for the WSA, she was operated under the management of Agwilines Inc. Torpedoed and damaged by Japanese aircraft in the Leyte Gulf on 5 December 1944. She was taken in tow, but was torpedoed and sunk the next day.

== Anton M. Holter ==
Anton M. Holter was built by Oregon Shipbuilding Corporation. Her keel was laid on 9 July 1943. She was launched on 29 July and delivered as Sambay on 5 August. To MoWT, operated under the management of Glen Line Ltd. Sold in 1947 to T. & J. Harrison, Liverpool and renamed Senator. Requisitioned in 1956 by the British Ministry of Transport during the Suez Crisis. Sold in 1964 to Bienventos Compania Navigation SA, Panama and renamed Ajax. Scrapped at Kaohsiung in May 1968.

== Antonin Dvorak ==
Antonin Dvorak was built by Permanente Metals Corporation. Her keel was laid on 10 November 1943. She was launched on 27 November and delivered on 7 December. Sold for scrapping in March 1959. Broke free from the tug Oiltransco on 28 March whilst under tow from Wilmington, North Carolina to Baltimore and came ashore at Cape Hatteras, North Carolina. Refloated in April and towed to Baltimore. Scrapped later that year.

== A. P. Hill ==
A. P. Hill was built by Todd Houston Shipbuilding Corporation. Her keel was laid on 13 August 1942. She was launched on 15 October and delivered on 31 October. She was scrapped at Panama City, Florida in October 1965.

== Aram J. Pothier ==
Aram J. Pothier was built by New England Shipbuilding Corporation. Her keel was laid on 1 May 1944. She was launched on 16 June and delivered on 28 June. Laid up at Beaumont post-war, she was scrapped at Brownsville in June 1970.

== Archbishop Lamy ==
Archbishop Lamy was built by California Shipbuilding Corporation. Her keel was laid on 11 November 1942. She was launched on 12 December and delivered on 28 December. She was scrapped at Mobile in April 1964.

== Archibald R. Mansfield ==
Archibald R. Mansfield was built by New England Shipbuilding Corporation. Her keel was laid on 13 July 1944. She was launched on 31 August and delivered on 9 September. She was scrapped at Wilmington, North Carolina in June 1966.

== Arided ==
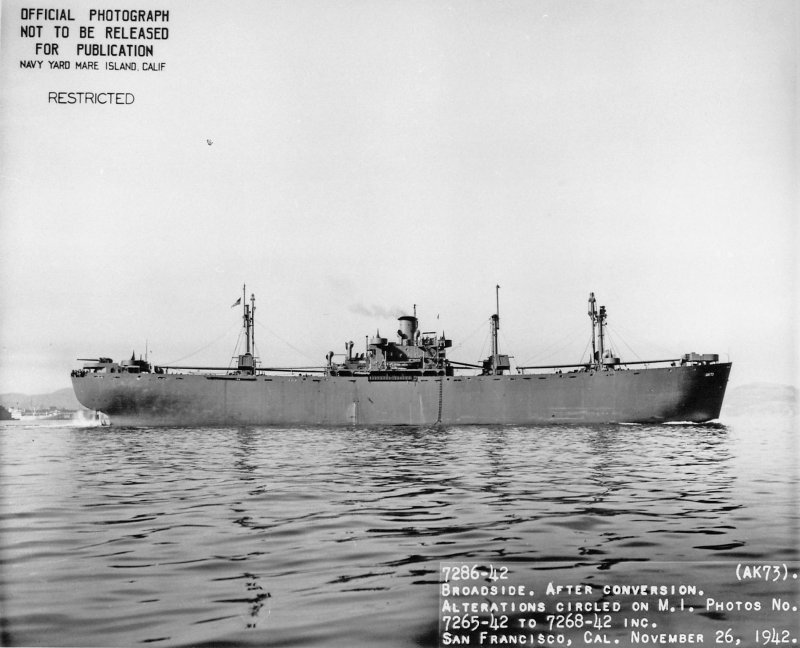
USS Arided

Arided was built by Permanente Metals Corporation. Her keel was laid on 20 September. She was launched as Noah H. Swayne on 28 October. She was completed as Arided for the United States Navy, and delivered on 12 November. Laid up in reserve in January 1946. Transferred to the WSA, laid up in Suisun Bay. Scrapped at Terminal Island in August 1962.

== Arkab ==
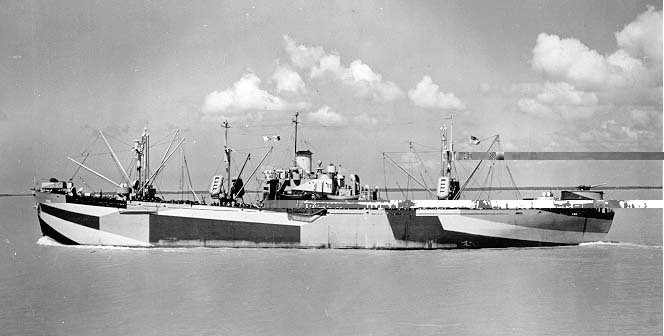
USS Arkab

Arkab was built by Delta Shipbuilding Company. Her keel was laid on 4 December 1943. She was launched as Warren Stone on 22 January 1944. She was completed by Alabama Drydock and Shipbuilding Company as Arkab for the United States Navy. She was delivered on 21 February 1944. To the WSA in January 1946. Laid up in the James River, she was scrapped at Burriana, Spain in November 1971.

== Arlie Clark ==
Arlie Clark was built by Southeastern Shipbuilding Corporation. Her keel was laid on 18 December 1944. She was launched on 27 January 1945 and delivered on 14 February. built for the WSA, she was operated under the management of Dichmann, Wright & Pugh. Management transferred to States Marine Corp. in 1946. Sold to her managers later that year and renamed Palmetto State. Sold in 1955 to Bethlehem Steel Corp. and renamed Flomar. Returned to the United States Government in exchange for a C4-class ship. Laid up in the James River. Scrapped at Santander in September 1970.

== Art Young ==
Art Young was built by J. A. Jones Construction Company, Panama City. Her keel was laid on 5 October 1944. She was launched on 13 November and delivered on 27 November. Laid up post-war at Beaumont, she was scrapped at Beaumont in January 1972.

== Artemas Ward ==
Artemas Ward was built by North Carolina Shipbuilding Company. Her keel was laid on 24 March 1942. She was launched on 14 June and delivered on 30 June. Built for the WSA, she was operated under the management of American Export Lines. Collided with the American tanker Manassas in the Irish Sea (51°52′N 5°31′W) on 24 March 1944 and was beached in Angle Bay. Sunk as part of Gooseberry 2 off Saint-Laurent, France on 8 June 1944. Foundered in storms between 19 and 22 June. Abandoned as a total loss on 16 July.

== Arthur A. Penn ==
Arthur A. Penn was built by Permanente Metals Corporation. Her keel was laid on 28 January 1944. She was launched on 17 February and delivered on 25 February. She was scrapped at Portland, Oregon in January 1959.

== Arthur Dobbs ==
Arthur Dobbs was built by North Carolina Shipbuilding Company. Her keel was laid on 24 May 1943. She was launched on 20 June and delivered on 27 June. Built for the WSA, she was operated under the management of Calmar Steamship Corp. Loaned to the Chinese Government in 1946 and renamed Hai Lieh. Operated under the management of China Merchants Steam Navigation Company. Sold to her managers in 1947. To United States Department of Commerce in 1952, returning to China Merchants Steam Navigation Company the next year. Sold in 1956 to Taiwan Navigation Co. Renamed Chi Lung, operated under the Chinese flag. Reflagged to Taiwan in 1965. Scrapped at Kaohsiung in May 1968.

== Arthur J. Tyrer ==
Arthur J. Tyrer was built by J. A. Jones Construction Company, Brunswick. Her keel was laid on 13 July 1944. She was launched on 22 August and delivered on 31 August. Built for the WSA, she was operated under the management of Grace Line. Laid up in the James River post-war, she was scrapped at Castellón de la Plana, Spain in May 1972.

== Arthur L. Perry ==
Arthur L. Perry was built by New England Shipbuilding Corporation. Her keel was laid on 4 June 1943. She was launched on 8 August and delivered on 21 August. She was scrapped at Seattle in 1957.

== Arthur M. Huddell ==
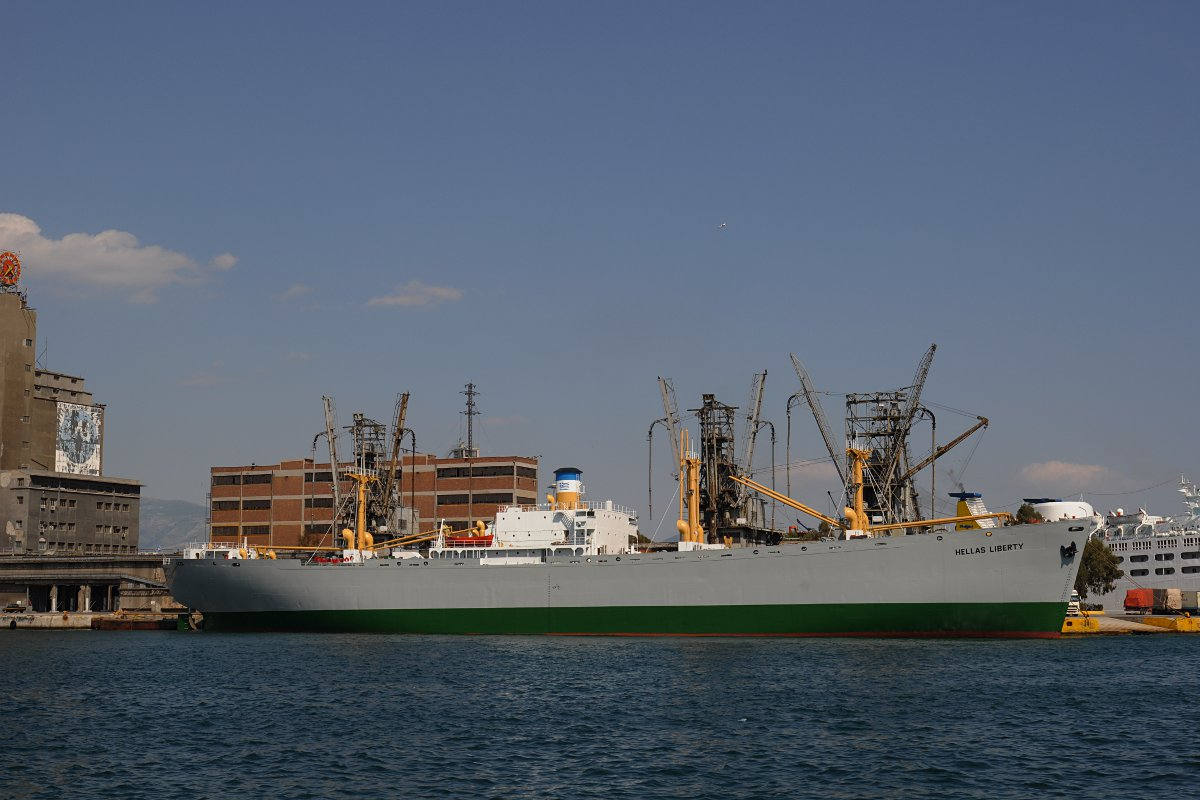
Hellas Liberty

Arthur M. Huddell was built by St Johns River Shipbuilding Company. Her keel was laid on 25 October 1943. She was launched on 7 December and delivered on 18 December. Converted to a pipe carrying ship in 1944 for use in Operation Pluto. Laid up in Suisun Bay in 1946. Sold in 1956 to American Telephone & Telegraph Co. Transported cables between Hawaii and the Arctic for use in the Distant Early Warning Line. Used in various classified projects, some under the jurisdiction of the United States Navy. In 1978, she was a special project ship of the Military Sealift Command. In 1980, she was used as a cable ship by the Simplex Wire & Cable Company. In 1982, she was operating in the Pacific Ocean under United States Navy control. Laid up in the James River in 1984, she was scheduled for disposal by scuttling. Donated to Greece in 2008, restored as a museum ship and renamed Hellas Liberty.

== Arthur M. Hulbert ==
Arthur M. Hulbert was built by J. A. Jones Construction Company, Brunswick. Her keel was laid on 4 November 1944. She was launched on 6 December and delivered on 16 December. Built for the WSA, she was operated under the management of Alcoa Steamship Co. She was scrapped at New Orleans in 1967.

== Arthur Middleton ==
Arthur Middleton was built by Alabama Drydock and Shipbuilding Company, Mobile. She was launched on 8 July 1943. Built for the WSA, she was operated under the management of Lykes Brothers Steamship Co. Torpedoed and sunk in the Mediterranean Sea off Cape Falcon, French Algeria (35°45′N 0°45′W) by U-73 on 1 January 1943 whilst on a voyage from New York to Oran, French Algeria.

== Arthur P. Davis ==
Arthur P. Davis was built by California Shipbuilding Corporation. Her keel was laid on 29 June 1943. She was launched on 23 July and delivered on 6 August. Built for the WSA, she was operated under the management of American West African Line. Sold in 1947 to North Valley Steamship Co. and renamed North Valley. Operated under the management of Norton Lilley Management Co. Sold in 1950 to Estados del Norte Compania Navigation, Panama and renamed Andre. Operated under the management of Orion Shipping & Trading Co. Management transferred to Seacrest Shipping Co. in 1952, then Seaways Shipping Corp. in 1957. Sold in 1960 to Marero Compania Navigation, Panama and renamed Captain Lemos. Placed under the Greek flag and the management of Eagle Ocean Transport Inc. Management transferred to G. Lemos Bros. in 1961, then Hunter Shipping Co. in 1966. Scrapped at Shanghai in May 1968.

== Arthur P. Gorman ==
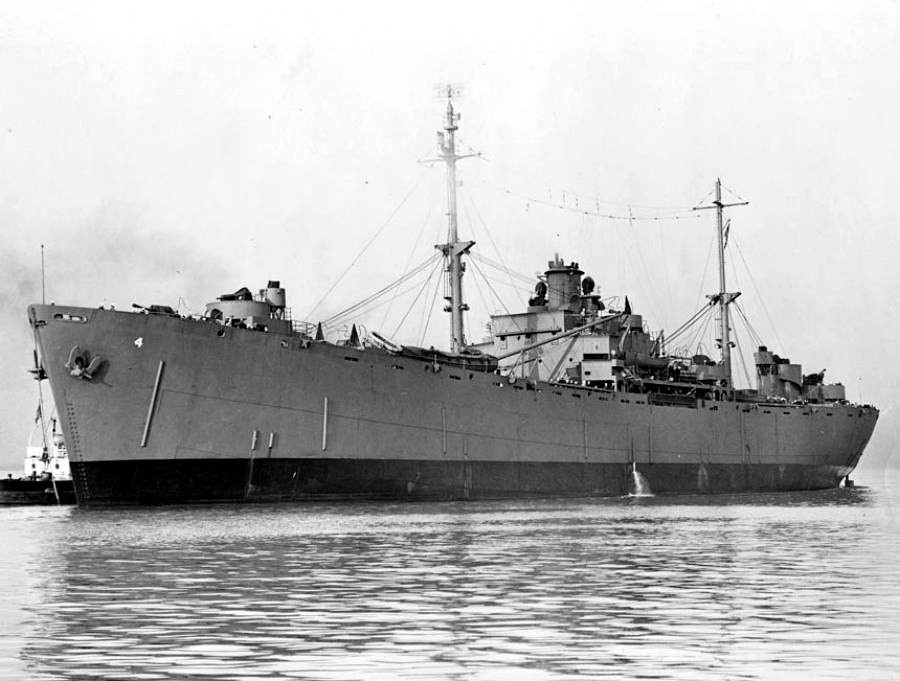
USS Tutuila

SS Arthur P. Gorman was built by Bethlehem Fairfield Shipyard. Her keel was laid on 11 August 1943. She was renamed Tutuila before being launched on 12 September and Delivered to the United States Navy on 18 September. She served as a floating advanced base. Laid up in reserve at Galveston in December 1946. Recommissioned in May 1951. Participated in the naval quarantine of Cuba during the Cuban Missile Crisis in October–November 1962. Assisted in supplying petrol to the Dominion Republic in 1963-64 after rebels had prevented normal tanker deliveries. Transferred to Taiwanese Navy on 21 February 1972 and renamed Pien Tai. Stricken in 1979.

== Arthur R. Lewis ==
Arthur R. Lewis was built by St. Johns River Shipbuilding Company. Her keel was laid on 13 March 1944. She was launched on 27 Apri9l and delivered on 12 May. She was scrapped at Philadelphia in January 1965.

== Arthur Riggs ==
Arthur Riggs was built by Oregon Shipbuilding Corporation. Her keel was laid on 15 January 1943. She was launched on 13 February and delivered on 23 February. She collided with the British steamship Egton off the Goodwin Sands on 7 November 1945. She was scrapped at Panama City, Florida in June 1962.

== Arthur Sewall ==
Arthur Sewall was built by New England Shipbuilding Corporation. Her keel was laid on 14 January 1944. She was launched on 7 March and delivered on 24 March. Built for the WSA, she was operated under the management of Eastern Steamship Co. Torpedoed and damaged in the English Channel by U-772 on 29 December 1944 whilst on a voyage from the Seine to Mumbles, United Kingdom. She was towed to Portland, United Kingdom where temporary repairs were made. Towed to Bremerhaven, Allied-occupied Germany on 11 May 1946 to ne loaded with obsolete chemical ammunition. Scuttled at sea on 12 October 1946.

== Arthur St. Clair ==
Arthur St. Clair was built by Todd Houston Shipbuilding Corporation. Her keel was laid on 5 April 1944. She was launched on 15 May and delivered on 26 Mau. She was scrapped at Wilmington, North Carolina in May 1963.

== Arunah S. Abell ==
Arunah S. Abell was built by Bethlehem Fairfield Shipyard. Her keel was laid on 4 July 1943. She was launched on 3 August and delivered on 12 August. She was scrapped at Baltimore in 1961.

== Asa Gray ==
Asa Gray was built by New England Shipbuilding Corporation. Her keel was laid on 8 March 1943. She was launched on 3 May and delivered on 17 May. She was scrapped at Kearny in September 1967.

== Ascella ==
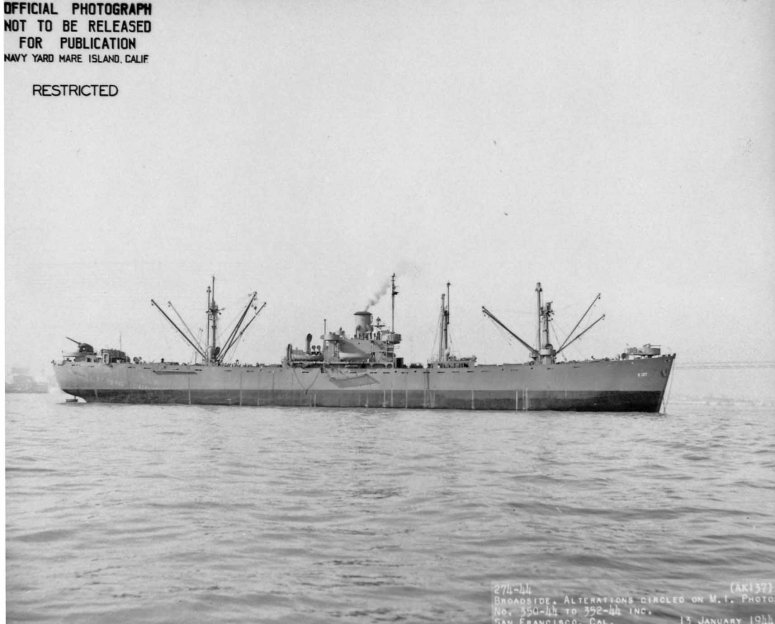
USS Ascella

Ascella was built by California Shipbuilding Corporation. Her keel was laid on 7 January 1943. She was launched as George C. Yount on 4 February and delivered as Ascella for the United States Navy on 23 February. Decommissioned at Pearl Harbor in August 1946, she was transferred to the USMC in May 1947 and renamed George C. Yount. Laid up in Suisun Bay. Scrapped at Terminal Island in June 1964.

== Askold ==
Askold was built by Oregon Shipbuilding Corporation. Her keel was laid on 5 June 1943. She was launched as Henry L. Pittock on 24 June and delivered as Askold on 2 July. To the Soviet Union under Lend-Lease. Renamed Dalryba in 1977. Scrapped in the Soviet Union in 1982.

== Assistance ==
Assistance was built by Bethlehem Fairfield Shipyard. Her keel was laid on 17 May 1944. She was launched on 20 June and delivered on 28 June as a repair ship for the United States Navy. Transferred to the Royal Navy. Returned to the United States Navy in August 1946. Laid up in the James River. Scrapped in the United States inn January 1971.

== August Belmont ==
August Belmont was built by St Johns River Shipbuilding Company. Her keel was laid on 1 March 1944. She was launched on 20 April and delivered on 30 April. Laid up in the James River post-war, she was scrapped at Darıca, Turkey in October 1970.

== Augustin Daly ==
Augustin Daly was built by Permanente Metals Corporation. Her keel was laid on 17 January 1944. She was launched on 17 February and delivered on 8 April. She was scrapped at Portland, Oregon in 1967.

== Augustine B. McManus ==
Augustine B. McManus was built by J. A. Jones Construction Company, Brunswick. Her keel was laid on 21 April 1944. She was launched on 10 June and delivered on 24 June. Built for the WSA, she was operated under the management of W. Rountree Co. Laid up in the Hudson River post-war, she was scrapped at Kearny in December 1970.

== Augustine Heard ==
Augustine Heard was built by New England Shipbuilding Corporation. Her keel was laid on 29 September 1942. She was launched on 26 November and delivered on 20 January 1943. Built for the WSA, she was operated under the management of Sprague Steamship Co. Sold in 1947 to Skibs A/S Herva, Oslo and renamed Herva. Operated under the management of Sigurd Herlofson & Co. Sold in 1952 to A/S Castillo, Oslo and renamed Modena. Operated under the management of Alf Torgersen & Co. Sold in 1956 to Arcturus Steamship Co. and renamed Alaska. Reflagged to Liberia and operated under the management of A. Luisi Ltd. Sold in 1960 to Alopha Compania Navigation. Reflagged to Lebanon and operated under the management of Vlassopoulos. Scrapped at Hong Kong in April 1968.

== Augustine Herman ==
Augustine Herman was built by Bethlehem Fairfield Shipyard. Her keel was laid on 9 October 1943. She was launched on as Augustine Herman 5 November and delivered as Samsette on 12 November. To the MoWT under Lend-Lease. Operated under the management of A. Holt & Co. Sold in 1947 to China Mutual Steam Navigation Co., Liverpool and renamed Eurypylus, remaining under the same management. Sold in 1951 to Glen Line Ltd., Liverpool and renamed Pembrokeshire. Sold in 1957 to Ocean Steamship Co., Liverpool and renamed Eurypylus. Operated under the management of A. Holt & Co. Sold in 1960 to Federal Shipping Co., Hong Kong and renamed Kota Bahru, remaining under the British flag. Sold in 1966 to Cresta Shipping Co., Panama and renamed Cresta. Operated under the management of Gibson Shipping Co. Scrapped at Kaohsiung in February 1968.

== Augustin Stahl ==
Augustin Stahl was built by California Shipbuilding Corporation. Her keel was laid on 11 December 1943. She was launched on 5 January 1944 and delivered on 22 January. Built for the WSA, she was operated under the management of Polaris Steamship Co. To the Dutch Government in 1947 and renamed Van't Hoff. Operated under the management of Halcyon Lijn NV. Management transferred to Koninklijk Rotterdamsche Lloyd in 1948. Sold to her managers in 1950 and renamed Tomori. Sold in 1960 to Marina Compania Navigation, Panama and renamed Thetis. Operated under the management of Dracoulis Ltd. Sold in 1963 to Simfonia Compania Navigation, Panama and renamed Marmion. Reflagged to Liberia and operated under the management of Dynamic Shipping Inc. Scrapped at Split in September 1969.

== Augustus H. Garland ==
Augustus H. Garland was built by California Shipbuilding Corporation. Her keel was laid on 30 June 1943. She was launched on 24 July and delivered as Samblade on 8 August. To MoWT, operated under the management of Port Line Ltd. To USMC in 1948, renamed Augustus H. Garland and laid up in the James River. Scrapped at Baltimore in October 1959.

== Augustus P. Loring ==
Augustus P. Loring was built by New England Shipbuilding Corporation. Her keel was laid on 10 May 1944. She was launched on 27 June and delivered on 3 July. Laid up in the James River post-war, she was scrapped at Kearny in October 1971.

== Augustus Saint-Gaudens ==
Augustus Saint-Gaudens was built by J. A. Jones Construction Company, Panama City. Her keel was laid on 20 December 1943. She was launched on 17 February 1944 and delivered on 30 March. Built for the WSA, she was operated under the management of Black Diamond Steamship Corp. To Italian Government in 1947 and renamed Nazareno. Operated under the management of Società Coop di Navigazione a Resp. Ltda. Sold to her managers in 1948. Scrapped at La Spezia in February 1967.

== Augustus S. Merrimon ==
Augustus S. Merrimon was built by North Carolina Shipbuilding Company. Her keel was laid on 12 July 1943. She was launched on 11 August and delivered on 19 August. She was scrapped in Baltimore in October 1957.

== Augustus Thomas ==
Augustus Thomas was built by Permanente Metals Corporation. Her keel was laid on 29 August 1943. She was launched on 17 September and delivered on 26 September. Built for the WSA, she was operated under the management of Pacific Far East Line. Severely damaged by a crashing Japanese aircraft in San Pedro Bay, Philippines on 24 October 1944 and was beached. Further damage sustained in an air attack on 17 November. Later refloated and towed to Hollandia, Netherlands East Indies, where she was declared a constructive total loss. Subsequently towed to Newcastle, Australia then Suisun Bay and laid up. Offered for sale for scrap in January 1947. Scrapped at Oakland in 1957.

== Avery Island ==
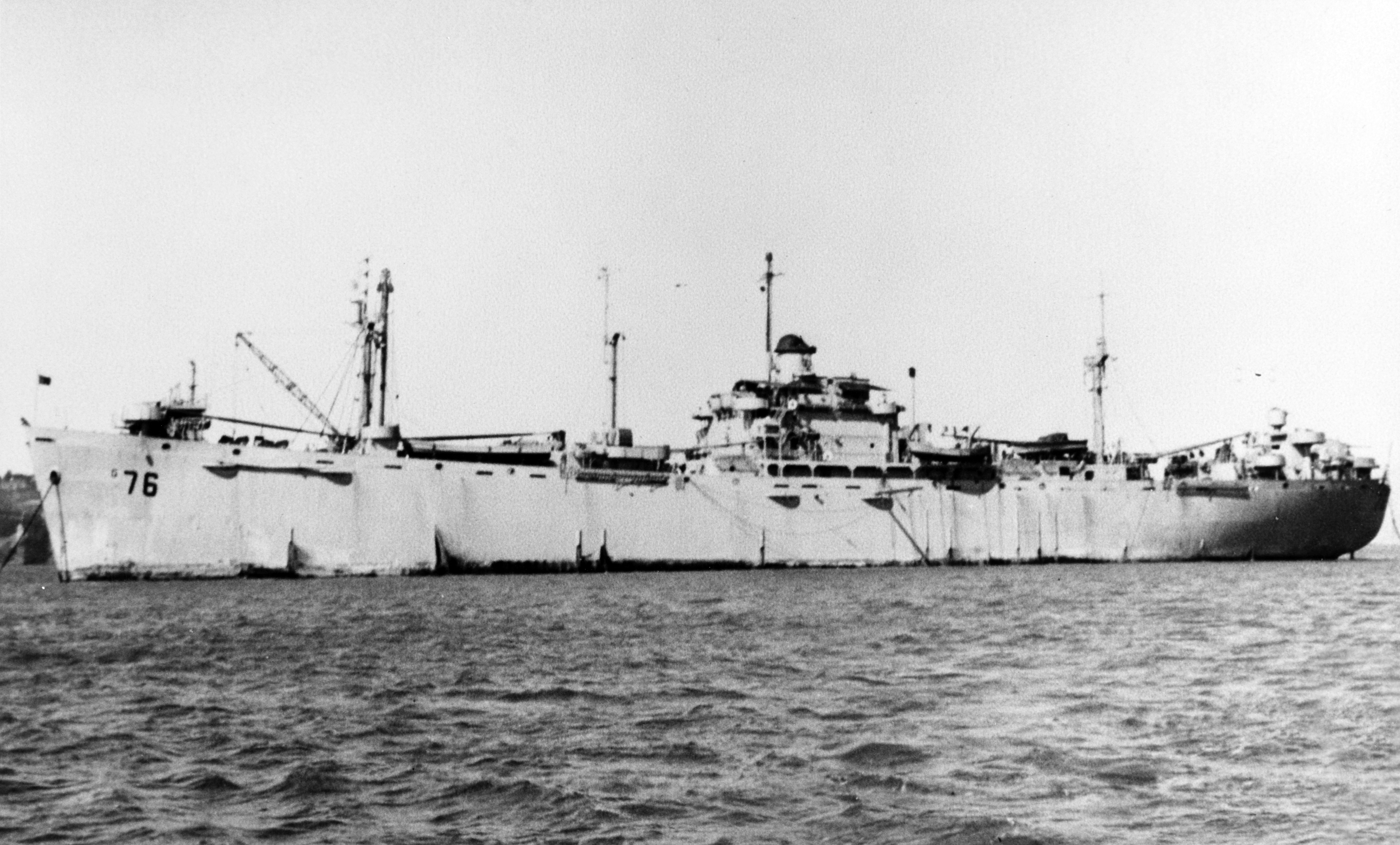
USS Avery Island

Avery Island was built by New England Shipbuilding Corporation. Her keel was laid on 31 October 1944. She was launched on 13 December. She was completed by Atlantic Basin Iron Works, New York, in December 1944 for the United States Navy. Avery Island was delivered on 21 December. Used as an instrumentation monitoring ship during Operation Crossroads in 1946. Placed in reserve at San Pedro, California in May 1947. Scrapped at Sakai in March 1967.

== Sources ==
- Sawyer, L.A.; Mitchell, W.H. (1985). The Liberty Ships (2nd ed.). London: Lloyd's of London Press Ltd. ISBN 1-85044-049-2.
