= Annie Oakley (disambiguation) =

Annie Oakley (1860–1926) was a sharpshooter in Buffalo Bill's Wild West Show.

Annie Oakley may also refer to:

- Annie Oakley (1894 film), a short film
- Annie Oakley (1935 film), starring Barbara Stanwyck
- Annie Oakley (TV series) (1954–1957)
- SS Annie Oakley, a Liberty ship in World War II

== See also ==
- Ann Oakley (born 1944), British sociologist, feminist, and writer
