= Abigail Adams (disambiguation) =

Abigail Adams (1744–1818) was the wife and closest advisor of U.S. president John Adams.

Abigail or Abbie Adams may also refer to:

- Abigail Adams Smith (1765–1813), née Abigail Adams, daughter of President John Adams and his wife, First Lady Abigail Adams
- SS Abigail Adams, a Liberty ship
- Abbie Adams (born 1990), American artist
- Abigail Brooks Adams, granddaughter-in-law of John and Abigail Adams
- Abbie Adams, character in Flood!
