= SS Abigail Adams =

1943 cargo ship in United States Navy

History

United States
- Name: Abigail Adams
- Namesake: Abigail Adams
- Owner: War Shipping Administration (WSA)
- Operator: American Foreign Steamship Corporation
- Builder: Permanente Metals Corporation
- Yard number: 2
- Way number: 4
- Laid down: 24 February 1943
- Launched: 21 March 1943
- Fate: Scrapped on 19 September 1972

General characteristics
- Class & type: Liberty ship, type EC2-S-C1 (standard)
- Tonnage: 10,865 LT DWT; 7,176 GRT
- Displacement: 3,380 long tons (3,434 t) (light); 14,245 long tons (14,474 t) (max)
- Length: 441 feet 6 inches (135 m) oa; 416 feet (127 m) pp; 427 feet (130 m) lwl
- Beam: 57 feet (17 m)
- Draft: 27 ft 9.25 in (8.4646 m)
- Propulsion: 1 × triple-expansion steam engine, 1 × screw propeller
- Speed: 11.5 knots (21.3 km/h; 13.2 mph)
- Complement: 38–62 USMM; 21–40 USNAG
- Armament: Varied by ship; Bow-mounted 3-inch (76 mm)/50-caliber gun; Stern-mounted 4-inch (102 mm)/50-caliber gun; 2–8 × single 20-millimeter (0.79 in) Oerlikon anti-aircraft (AA) cannons and/or, 2–8 × 37-millimeter (1.46 in) M1 AA guns

SS Abigail Adams was a Liberty ship built in the United States during World War II. The ship was named after Abigail Adams, who was the wife and closest advisor of John Adams and the mother of John Quincy Adams. She is also sometimes considered to be one of the Founders of the United States.

== History ==
She was laid down on 24 February 1943 and built by the Permanente Metals Corporation in Richmond Shipyards in Richmond, California. On 21 March 1943, just 25 days after being laid down, she was launched. She was delivered to the United States Maritime Commission and the War Shipping Administration on 1 April 1943 and operated by the American Foreign Steamship Corporation.

On 16 September 1949, Abigail Adams entered the reserve fleet but briefly re-entered service from 14 March 1951 until 15 May 1952 for service in the Korean War. After sitting in the reserve fleet for two decades, she was sold to Consolidated Steel Corporation on 10 July 1972 for $47,009.33, or $332,404.21 in today's money (as of September 2022). She was delivered to Beaumont, Texas on 19 September 1972 where she was subsequently scrapped.

== See also ==
- List of Liberty ships (A–F)
