= SS Arthur J. Tyrer =

World War II Liberty ship of the United States

History

United States
- Name: Arthur J. Tyrer
- Namesake: Arthur J. Tyrer
- Ordered: as type (EC2-S-C1) hull, MC hull 2372
- Builder: J.A. Jones Construction, Brunswick, Georgia
- Cost: $1,006,070
- Yard number: 157
- Way number: 5
- Laid down: 13 July 1944
- Launched: 22 August 1944
- Sponsored by: Mrs. H.D. Ussery
- Completed: 31 August 1944
- Identification: Call Signal: KSFD
- Fate: Laid up in National Defense Reserve Fleet, Wilmington, North Carolina, 15 April 1948; Laid up in National Defense Reserve Fleet, James River Group, Lee Hall, Virginia, 23 April 1953; Sold for scrapping, 19 November 1971

General characteristics
- Class & type: Liberty ship; type EC2-S-C1, standard
- Tonnage: 10,865 LT DWT; 7,176 GRT
- Displacement: 3,380 long tons (3,434 t) (light); 14,245 long tons (14,474 t) (max)
- Length: 441 feet 6 inches (135 m) oa; 416 feet (127 m) pp; 427 feet (130 m) lwl
- Beam: 57 feet (17 m)
- Draft: 27 ft 9.25 in (8.4646 m)
- Installed power: 2 × Oil fired 450 °F (232 °C) boilers, operating at 220 psi (1,500 kPa); 2,500 hp (1,900 kW)
- Propulsion: 1 × triple-expansion steam engine, (manufactured by General Machinery Corp., Hamilton, Ohio); 1 × screw propeller
- Speed: 11.5 knots (21.3 km/h; 13.2 mph)
- Capacity: 562,608 cubic feet (15,931 m^{3}) (grain); 499,573 cubic feet (14,146 m^{3}) (bale)
- Complement: 38–62 USMM; 21–40 USNAG
- Armament: Varied by ship; Bow-mounted 3-inch (76 mm)/50-caliber gun; Stern-mounted 4-inch (102 mm)/50-caliber gun; 2–8 × single 20-millimeter (0.79 in) Oerlikon anti-aircraft (AA) cannons and/or, 2–8 × 37-millimeter (1.46 in) M1 AA guns

SS Arthur J. Tyrer was a Liberty ship built in the United States during World War II. She was named after Arthur J. Tyrer, a supervising inspector general for the Steamboat Inspection Service and a founding member of the Bureau of Navigation in 1903.

== Construction ==
Arthur J. Tyrer was laid down on 13 July 1944, under a Maritime Commission (MARCOM) contract, MC hull 2372, by J.A. Jones Construction, Brunswick, Georgia; she was sponsored by Mrs. H.D. Ussery, and launched on 22 August 1944.

== History ==
She was allocated to Grace Line, on 31 August 1944. On 15 April 1948, she was laid up in the National Defense Reserve Fleet in Wilmington, North Carolina. On 23 April 1953, she was laid up in the National Defense Reserve Fleet in the James River Group, Lee Hall, Virginia. On 25 June 1953, she was withdrawn from the fleet to be loaded with grain under the "Grain Program 1953". She returned to the fleet loaded with grain on 16 July 1953. She was withdrawn from the fleet on 13 June 1956, to have the grain unloaded and returned empty on 26 July 1956. On 22 July 1958, she was withdrawn from the fleet to be loaded with grain under the "Grain Program 1958", she returned loaded with grain on 6 August 1956. She was withdrawn from the fleet on 2 February 1960, to have the grain unloaded and returned empty on 5 February 1960. On 21 October 1961, she was withdrawn from the fleet to be loaded with grain under the "Grain Program 1960", she returned loaded with grain on 31 October 1960. She was withdrawn from the fleet on 4 February 1963, to have the grain unloaded and returned empty on 9 February 1963. On 19 November 1971, she was sold, along with five other ships, for $433,200, to N.V. Intershitra, Rotterdam, for scrapping. She was removed from the fleet on 8 March 1972.

== Bibliography ==
- "Jones Construction, Brunswick GA". www.ShipbuildingHistory.com. 13 October 2010.
- "Liberty Ships – World War II".
- Maritime Administration. "Arthur J. Tyrer". Ship History Database Vessel Status Card. U.S. Department of Transportation, Maritime Administration. Archived from the original on 12 December 2019.
- Davies, James (May 2004). "Specifications (As-Built)" (PDF). p. 23.
- "SS Arthur J. Tyrer".
