= SS Abraham Clark =

WWII Liberty Ship

History

United States
- Name: Abraham Clark
- Namesake: Abraham Clark
- Builder: California Shipbuilding Corporation, Terminal Island, Los Angeles
- Laid down: 3 December 1941
- Launched: 2 April 1942
- Fate: Sold, 1947. Wrecked, 1959.

General characteristics
- Type: Liberty ship
- Tonnage: 7,000 DWT
- Length: 441 ft 6 in (134.57 m)
- Beam: 56 ft 11 in (17.35 m)
- Draft: 27 ft 9 in (8.46 m)
- Propulsion: 2 oil-fired boilers; Triple expansion steam engine; 1 screw; 2,500 hp (1,864 kW)
- Speed: 11.5 knots (21.3 km/h; 13.2 mph)
- Capacity: 9,140 long tons (9,287 t) cargo
- Complement: 41
- Armament: 1 × stern-mounted 4 in (100 mm) deck gun for use against surfaced submarines; Variety of anti-aircraft guns

SS Abraham Clark (Hull Number 75) was a Liberty ship built in the United States during World War II. She was named after Abraham Clark, a signer of the Declaration of Independence from New Jersey.

The ship was laid down by the California Shipbuilding Corporation, Terminal Island, Los Angeles on 3 December 1941, then launched on 2 April 1942. She was operated by the Grace Line and took part in operations supporting the invasion of Normandy in June 1944.

The ship survived the war and was sold into private ownership in 1947. However, in 1959, the ship was wrecked off Grays Harbor in Washington and subsequently scrapped.
