= USS Syrma =

Cargo ship of the United States Navy

History

United States
- Name: Andres Almonaster; Syrma
- Namesake: Andres Almonaster; The star system Syrma
- Ordered: as a type (EC2-S-C1) hull, MCE hull 2455, SS Andres Almonaster
- Builder: Delta Shipbuilding Co., New Orleans, Louisiana
- Laid down: 10 January 1944
- Launched: 19 February 1944
- Sponsored by: Mrs. James L. Wallace
- Acquired: 20 March 1944
- Commissioned: 21 March 1944
- Decommissioned: 27 March 1944
- In service: 3 August 1944
- Out of service: 8 January 1946
- Refit: converted to Naval service at Todd-Galveston Drydock Co., Galveston, TX., from 27 March to 12 August 1944
- Stricken: 21 January 1946
- Identification: Hull symbol:AK-134
- Fate: sold to Fordham Trading Corp., 6 January 1948, renamed SS San Jorge; Renamed SS St. John in 1954; Scrapped in 1968 at Shanghai, People's Republic of China

General characteristics
- Class & type: Crater-class cargo ship
- Displacement: 4,023 long tons (4,088 t) (standard); 14,550 long tons (14,780 t) (full load)
- Length: 441 ft 6 in (134.57 m)
- Beam: 56 ft 11 in (17.35 m)
- Draft: 28 ft 4 in (8.64 m)
- Installed power: 2 × Babcock & Wilcox header-type boilers, 220psi 450°; 2,500 shp (1,900 kW)
- Propulsion: 1 × American Ship Building Company triple-expansion reciprocating steam engine; 1 × shaft
- Speed: 12.5 kn (23.2 km/h; 14.4 mph)
- Complement: 240
- Armament: 1 × 5 in (130 mm)/38-caliber dual-purpose gun; 1 × 3 in (76 mm)/50-caliber dual purpose gun; 2 × 40 mm (1.6 in) Bofors anti-aircraft gun mounts; 8 × 20 mm (0.79 in) Oerlikon cannons anti-aircraft gun mounts

USS Syrma (AK-134) was a Crater-class cargo ship commissioned by the U.S. Navy for service in World War II. She was responsible for delivering troops, goods and equipment to locations in the war zone.

== Built in New Orleans, Louisiana ==
Syrma (AK-134), ex-SS Andres Almonaster (MC hull 2455), was laid down on 10 January 1944 by the Delta Shipbuilding Co., New Orleans, Louisiana; launched on 19 February 1944; sponsored by Mrs. James L. Wallace; acquired by the Navy on 20 March 1944; and commissioned on 21 March 1944.

== World War II operations ==
Syrma was acquired from the War Shipping Administration on a bareboat charter and converted to naval use as an auxiliary cargo ship by the Todd-Galveston Drydock Co., Galveston, Texas, from 27 March to 12 August 1944. She sailed for Norfolk, Virginia, the next day and arrived there on the 20th to begin her shakedown cruise. She was in the yard from 26 to 31 August for a short availability period and sailed with a convoy on 3 September. Her orders were modified five days later to proceed independently to Gulfport, Mississippi. Syrma loaded cargo there from 10 to 14 September and moved to New Orleans to complete loading.

=== Pacific Theatre operations ===
Syrma, moved to Mobile, Alabama, where she took AFD-29 in tow and sailed for Panama on the 23d. She arrived at the Panama Canal Zone on 30 September; remained there until 9 October; and continued on to Hawaii. She arrived at Pearl Harbor on 31 October and remained in the islands until 25 November when she got underway for San Francisco, California. The cargo ship arrived there on 4 December 1944 and got underway for Portland, Oregon, the same day. Syrma remained there until 28 January 1945 when she departed for San Francisco. She loaded cargo from 1 to 9 February and sailed for Manus Island on the 10th with YF-619 in tow.

=== Supporting troops on Tarawa ===
Syrma arrived at Seeadler Harbor on 7 March; unloaded her cargo and tow; and began the return voyage to San Francisco on the 23d. She arrived on 13 April and remained there until 8 June when she sailed for Hawaii with YF-738 in tow. She arrived at Pearl Harbor on 18 May, released the tow, and sailed the next day for Tarawa, Gilbert Islands. Tarawa was reached on the 28th. The ship unloaded her cargo and took on deck cargo for the Marshall Islands and left the next day.

=== End-of-war operations ===
Syrma operated in the Marshalls from 1 July to 12 August when she stood out for San Francisco, arriving there on the 26th. On 28 September, the ship again headed westward en route to Guam. She arrived at Apra Harbor on 18 October and departed Guam on 10 November for the east coast of the United States. The Panama Canal was transited on 9 December, and Syrma arrived at Norfolk on the 20th.

== Post-war decommissioning ==
The remainder of December 1945 was spent in preparing the ship for inactivation. Syrma was decommissioned on 8 January 1946, returned to the War Shipping Administration on the 11th, and struck from the Navy List on 21 January 1946.
