= SS Annie Oakley =

World War II Liberty ship of the United States

General characteristics
- Type: Cargo ship
- Tonnage: 10,856 tonnes deadweight (DWT)
- Displacement: 14,245 tons
- Length: 135 m (441 ft 6 in)
- Beam: 17.3 m (56 ft 10.75 in)
- Draft: 8.5 m (27 ft 9.25 in)
- Propulsion: Two oil-fired boilers, triple-expansion steam engine, single screw, 2,500 horsepower (1,864 kW)
- Speed: 11 to 11.5 knots (20 to 21 km/h)
- Range: 23,000 miles (37,000 km)
- Complement: 41 men
- Armament: Stern-mounted 4-in (102 mm) deck gun for use against surfaced submarines, variety of anti-aircraft guns

SS Annie Oakley (Hull Number 2227) was a Liberty ship built in the United States during World War II. She was named after Annie Oakley, an American sharpshooter from the American West.

The ship was laid down on 21 August 1943, then launched on 12 September 1943. She was lost after she was torpedoed by a German submarine in the English Channel in 1945.
