= Banner-class environmental research ship =

US Navy ship class

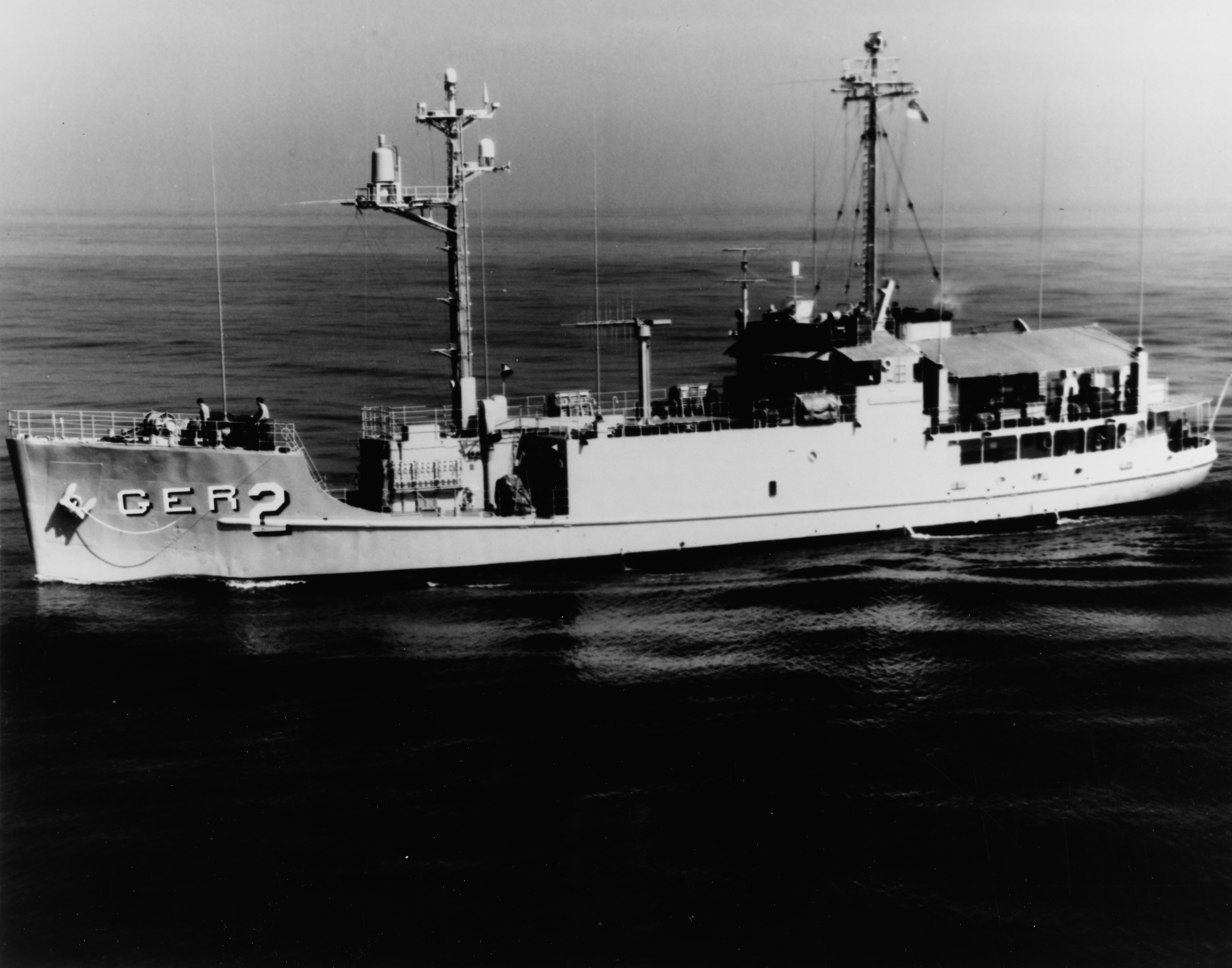
- USS Pueblo in October 1967

Class overview
- Name: Banner class
- Builders: Kewaunee Shipbuilding and Engineering Corporation, Kewaunee, Wisconsin; Higgins Industries, New Orleans, Louisiana
- Operators: United States Navy
- Subclasses: None
- Built: 1944
- In service: 1945–Present
- Completed: 3
- Active: 1
- Lost: 1
- Retired: 1

General characteristics
- Type: (As Built) Army Freight and Supply (FS); (Initial Navy) Light Cargo Ship (AKL); (As Converted) Environmental Research Ship
- Displacement: 550 tons light, 895 tons full, 345 tons dead
- Length: 177 ft (54 m)
- Beam: 32 ft (9.8 m)
- Draft: 9 ft (2.7 m)
- Propulsion: 2 x 500 hp (370 kW) GM Cleveland Division 6-278A 6-cyl V6 diesel engines
- Speed: 12.7 knots (23.5 km/h; 14.6 mph)
- Complement: 83 as AGER
- Armament: 2 × M2 Browning .50-caliber machine guns, small arms

The Banner class is a class of three environmental research ships converted from Camano-class cargo ships by the United States Navy during the 1960s. The class comprised three ships: Banner, Pueblo, and Palm Beach. The ships were originally United States Army vessels, which had been built in 1944. Although officially classified as environmental research ships, they were actually used for signals intelligence gathering, as part of the AGER program.

In 1964 the Department of Defence became interested in having smaller, less expensive, more flexible, and responsive signals intelligence collection vessels than the existing AGTR and T-AG vessels. The mothballed light cargo ships were the most suitable existing DOD ships. The National Security Agency (NSA) wanted 25 AGER vessels, though after a detailed discussion with the Navy, this was reduced to 15 in budget requests for what the NSA called the Phase I and Phase II Trawler program. Eventually, only three were converted.

== Ships in class ==
=== Banner ===
Banner (AKL-25) was the second ship of the United States Navy named in honor of Banner County, Nebraska. Her keel was laid down in 1944 as the US Army small freighter Captain William M. Galt (FS-345) by Kewaunee Shipbuilding and Engineering Corporation of Kewaunee, Wisconsin. She was commissioned on 26 July 1944, Lieutenant Junior Grade G.W. Oberst of the United States Coast Guard Reserve in command. During World War II, FS-345 served in the Southwest Pacific Theater, operating at Guam and Manila. She was acquired by the United States Navy on 1 July 1950, and placed in service by the Military Sea Transportation Service and redesignated T-AKL-25. On 24 November 1950, she was commissioned as Banner (AKL-25). Banner was assigned to Pacific Fleet's Service Division 31, where she supplied bases in the Pacific. She was converted to an environmental research ship from August to October 1965, after which she collected intelligence out of Yokosuka until decommissioning on 14 November 1969. She was scrapped by Mitsui and Co. at Tadotsu from 5 June 1970.

=== Pueblo ===
Pueblo (AGER-2) was the third ship of the United States Navy named in honor of Pueblo, Colorado. She was laid down in 1944, as the US Army small freighter FS-344 by Kewaunee Shipbuilding and Engineering Corporation of Kewaunee, Wisconsin. She was commissioned on 7 April 1945. FS-344 was placed out of service in 1954. FS-344 was transferred to the United States Navy on 12 April 1966, and was renamed Pueblo (AKL-44). Initially, she served as a light cargo ship, but shortly after resuming service was converted to an intelligence gathering ship and redesignated AGER-2 on 13 May 1967.

On 23 January 1968, Pueblo was attacked, boarded, and seized by North Korean forces while in, according to U.S. officials, international waters. As of 2016, Pueblo is still held by North Korea as a tourist attraction in Pyongyang, North Korea. She was moored on the Taedong River, near the spot that the General Sherman incident is believed to have taken place, from 1999 until 2012. In late 2012 Pueblo was moved again to the Botong River in Pyongyang next to a new addition to the Pyongyang Victorious War Museum, where the ship is currently located. The ship was renovated and made open to tourists with an accompanying video of the North Korean perspective in late July 2013. To commemorate the anniversary of the Korean War, the ship had a new layer of paint added.

Pueblo is still considered to be commissioned by the United States Navy and remains the second-oldest commissioned ship in the U.S. Navy, behind USS Constitution. Pueblo is one of only a few American ships to have been captured since the wars in Tripoli.

=== Palm Beach ===
Palm Beach (AGER-3) was the only ship of the United States Navy named after Palm Beach, Florida. She was laid down in 1944, as the US Army small freighter Colonel Armond Peterson (FS-217), a Design 427 coastal freighter. First based in San Francisco, Colonel Armond Peterson later surveyed the coasts of Central America after being moved to Balboa, in the Panama Canal Zone. Placed in reserve on 17 February 1956, Colonel Armond Peterson was acquired by the United States Navy and converted to an environmental research ship, also being redesignated Palm Beach (AGER-3). She served for two years in that capacity, collecting intelligence in the Mediterranean Sea and the North Sea. The vessel was decommissioned in 1969, and later sold to a private owner, involved in drug smuggling and later sunk and used as a scuba diving reef.
