= Monument to the Victorious Fatherland Liberation War =

Monument in Pyongyang, North Korea

- North Korea
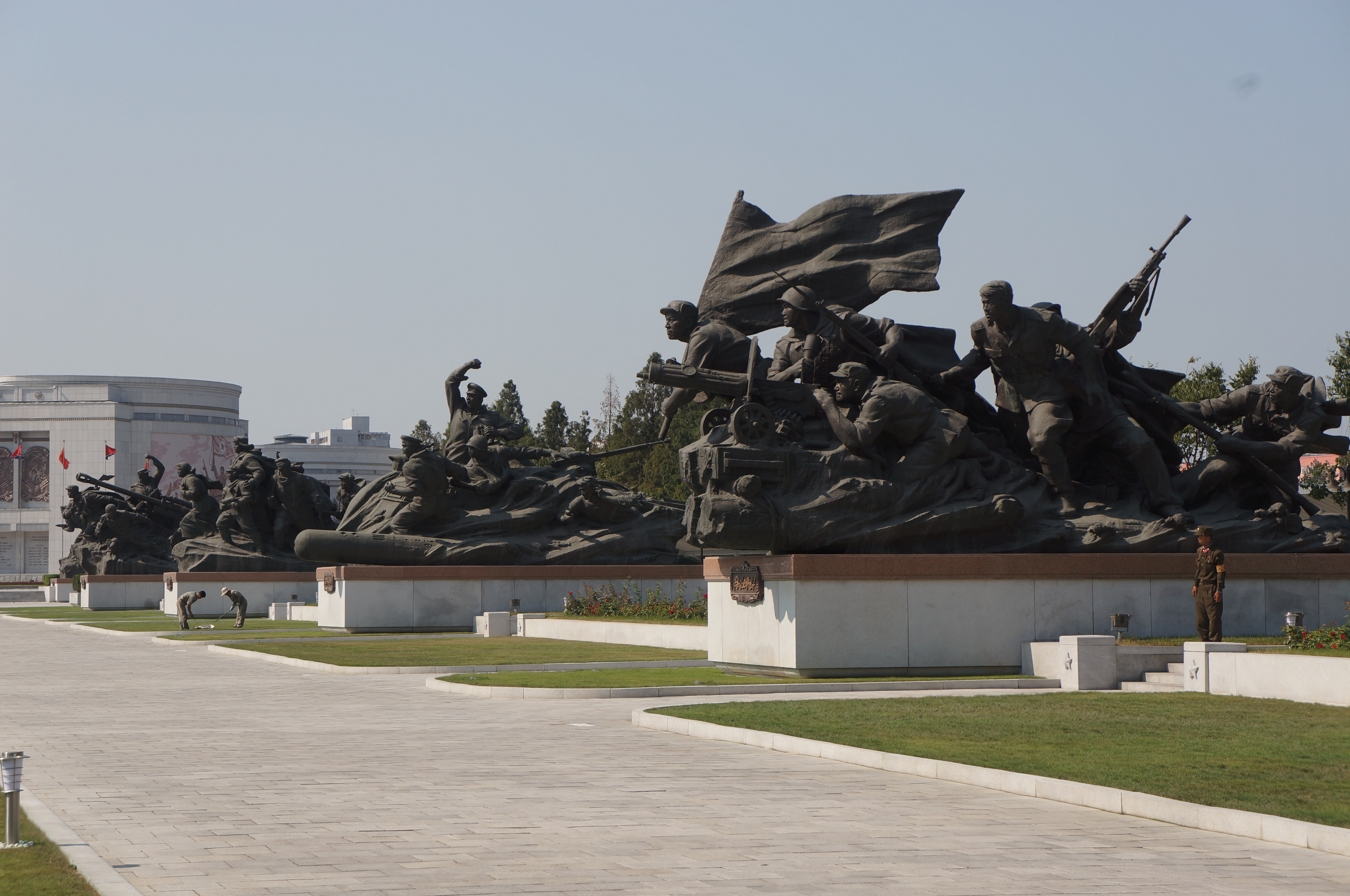
- The monument in 2013
- For Korean War
- Established: 1993
- Location: 39°02′22″N 125°44′21″E near Pyongyang, North Korea

The Monument to the Victorious Fatherland Liberation War is an outdoor monument in Pyongyang, North Korea. The monument is outside of the Victorious Fatherland Liberation War Museum. The monument itself is a series of statues depicting soldiers of the various branches of the Korean People's Army. The central statue of the collection is known as the Victory Statue and it depicts a soldier of the KPA raising the flag of North Korea. The monument was completed in 1993 to mark the 40th anniversary of the end of the Korean War (or the "Fatherland Liberation War", as it is referred to in North Korea). This includes side monuments titled "Defenders of Altitude 1211", "Liberated south Korea", "Heroes of Wolmido", "Moving the Artillery Gun Up", Peoples' Reinforcement Frontline", "Defenders of Airspace of the Fatherland", War of Liberation of Taejon", Defenders of the Fatherland's Maritime", "Battle of Nakdong River", and "Combat of the Peoples' Guerllia Force". Moored on a nearby bank of the Taedong River is the captured United States Navy spy ship the USS Pueblo.
