= Pothonggang Canal =

Canal in Pyongyang, North Korea

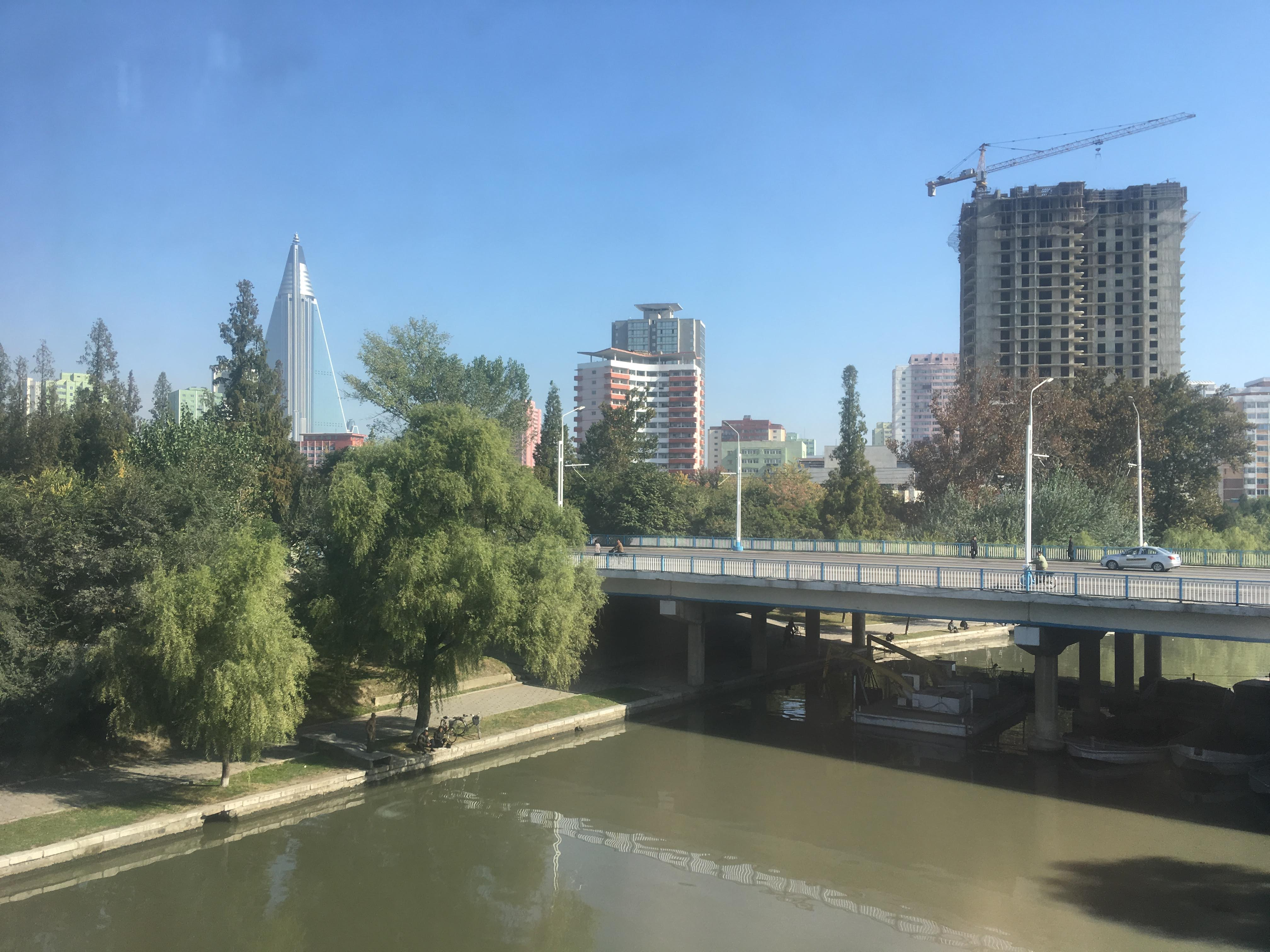

Korean name
- Hangul: 보통강운하
- Hanja: 普通江運河
- RR: Botonggang unha
- MR: Pot'onggang unha

The Pothonggang Canal (Pot'onggang Canal, Potonggang Unha) is a river in North Korea. It flows through the capital Pyongyang and is a tributary of the Pothong River. Prior to 1946, the canal was part of the Pothong River. That year, the Pothong River Improvement Project separated the Canal.

Today, the canal is home to a park, the Potong River Pleasure Ground. Since 2013, the USS Pueblo, a US Navy vessel captured by North Korea in 1968, is moored in the canal, where it serves as a museum ship.
