= Nathaniel M. Gorton =

American judge (born 1938)

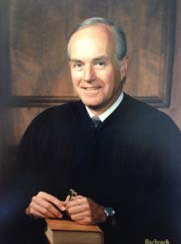

Senior Judge of the United States District Court for the District of Massachusetts
- Incumbent
- Assumed office May 31, 2025

Judge of the United States Foreign Intelligence Surveillance Court
- In office May 19, 2001 – May 18, 2008
- Appointed by: William Rehnquist
- Preceded by: John F. Keenan
- Succeeded by: Reggie Walton

Judge of the United States District Court for the District of Massachusetts
- In office September 24, 1992 – May 31, 2025
- Nominated by: George H. W. Bush
- Preceded by: Seat established by 104 Stat. 5089
- Succeeded by: vacant

Personal details
- Born: Nathaniel Matheson Gorton; 1938 (age 87–88) Evanston, Illinois, U.S.
- Relatives: Slade Gorton (brother)
- Education: Dartmouth College (BA); Columbia University (LLB)

Military service
- Branch/service: United States Navy
- Years of service: 1960–1962
- Rank: Lieutenant Junior Grade, and Executive Officer
- Unit: USS Banner (AKL-25) in the Western Pacific Ocean

Nathaniel Matheson Gorton (born 1938) is an American lawyer serving as a senior United States district judge of the United States District Court for the District of Massachusetts.

== Early life and early legal career ==
Gorton was born in 1938 in Evanston, Illinois, the son of Ruth (Israel) and Thomas Slade Gorton, Jr. His elder brother was Slade Gorton, who later became a member of the United States Senate from Washington.

Gorton received a Bachelor of Arts degree from Dartmouth College in 1960, and a Bachelor of Laws from Columbia Law School in 1966. He was in the United States Navy from 1960 to 1962, where he was a Lieutenant Junior Grade, and an executive officer on the USS Banner (AKL-25) in the Western Pacific Ocean.

Gorton worked in private practice in Boston from 1966 to 1992, where he was an associate in the trial and business departments at Nutter McClennen & Fish until 1969, an associate at Powers & Hall PC from 1970 to 1974 and a partner at the latter firm from 1975 until 1992, practicing civil business litigation.

== Federal judicial service ==
On April 28, 1992, Gorton was nominated by President George H. W. Bush to a new seat on the United States District Court for the District of Massachusetts created by Section 203(a)(14) of the Civil Justice Reform Act of 1990 (Pub. L. 101–650, 104 Stat. 5100). He was confirmed by the United States Senate on September 23, 1992, and received his commission the following day. He assumed senior status on May 31, 2025. In 2015 Gorton received the Federal Bar Association, Massachusetts chapter, Recognition Award for dedication and service.

According to the USA Today in April 2019, Gorton "has a reputation for issuing stronger sentences than his peers," while Law360 stated that he "has a reputation for being a no-nonsense, fairly conservative judge." He presided over the sentencing of many parents indicted in the 2019 College admissions bribery scandal, most notably actress Lori Loughlin and her husband, fashion designer Mossimo Giannulli, which saw the two of them sentenced to two months and five months in prison respectively.

== Other activities ==
Gorton is a former Chair of the Board of Trustees of Buckingham Browne & Nichols School, an independent co-educational day school in Cambridge, Massachusetts, with students from pre-kindergarten through 12th grade.

== See also ==
- List of United States federal judges by longevity of service

Legal offices
Preceded by Seat established by 104 Stat. 5089	Judge of the United States District Court for the District of Massachusetts; 1992–2025	Vacant
Preceded by John F. Keenan	Judge of the United States Foreign Intelligence Surveillance Court; 2001–2008	Succeeded by Reggie Walton
