= USS Banner (AKL-25) =

US Environmental research ship

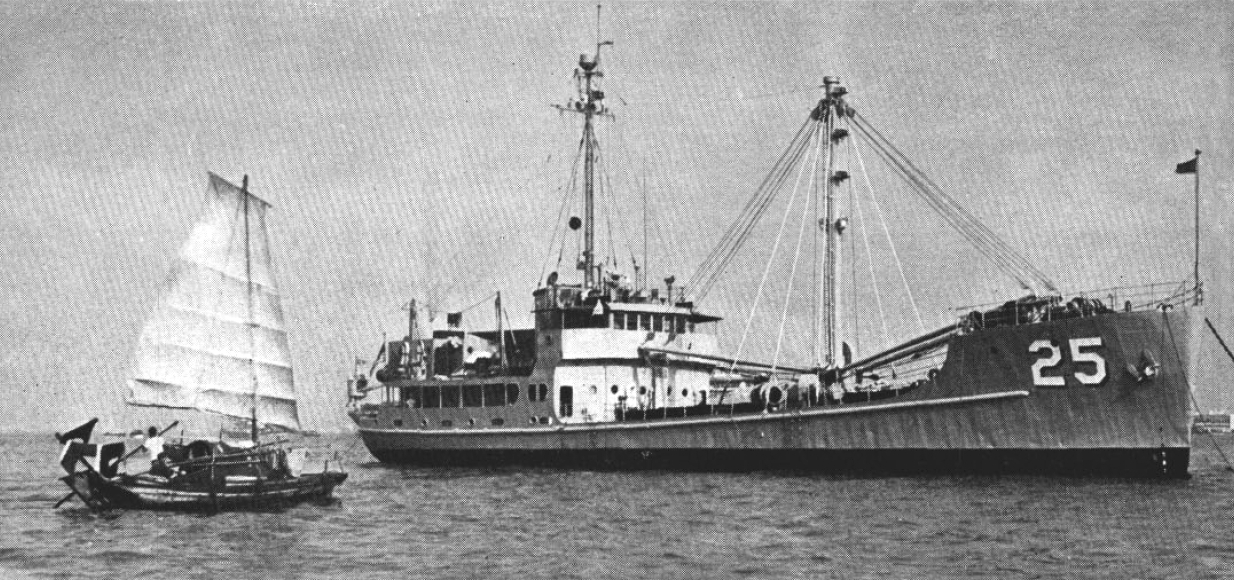
- USS Banner (AKL-25) at Hong Kong, 1959

History

United States
- Name: FS-345; Banner
- Builder: Kewaunee Shipbuilding and Engineering
- Laid down: 1944
- Commissioned: 24 November 1952
- Decommissioned: 14 November 1969
- Fate: Scrapped

General characteristics
- Displacement: 550 tons light, 895 tons full, 345 tons dead
- Length: 177 ft (54 m)
- Beam: 32 ft (9.8 m)
- Draft: 9 ft (2.7 m)
- Propulsion: twin diesel
- Speed: 12.7 knots (23.5 km/h)
- Complement: 6 officers, 70 men
- Armament: 2 × M2 Browning .50-caliber machine guns

The USS Banner (AKL-25, then AGER-1) was originally U.S. Army FS-345 serving in the Southwest Pacific during the closing days of World War II as one of the Army's United States Coast Guard crewed ships. In 1950 the ship was acquired by the Navy and converted into a light auxiliary cargo (AKL). In 1967 the ship was converted for electronic intelligence and reclassified as Auxiliary General Environmental Research (AGER).

== Construction ==
Banner was built as a Design 381 coastal freighter for the United States Army as U.S. Army FS-345 at Kewaunee Shipbuilding and Engineering Corporation, Kewaunee, Wisconsin, United States. (Note: The DANFS statement the ship was built as Captain William Galt is doubtful. The Army did not tend to name these vessels until 1945 or later. No other references, including the Coast Guard wartime synopsis mentions a name during this period.)

== History ==
U.S. Army FS-345 was Coast Guard manned during World War II, commissioning at Kewaunee 26 July 1944. (Note: The Army did not "commission" its ships. Those manned by Coast Guard crews underwent a commissioning in Coast Guard tradition.) The vessel was assigned to the Southwest Pacific Area operating there and moving north with Allied advances to Guam and finally Manila, being anchored there 1 July 1945 – 31 August 1945.

The ship was acquired by the Navy on 1 July 1950 and placed in service by the Military Sea Transportation Service and sometime before 20 August 1952 designated as T-AKL-25. On 5 September 1952 T-AKL-25 was renamed Banner and then, on 24 November 1952, at Pearl Harbor, T.H. commissioned as USS Banner (AKL-25). The ship was assigned to Service Division (ServDiv) 51, Service Force, Pacific Fleet, supplying advanced Pacific bases until assigned regular duty in the Mariana Islands supplying bases in those islands as well as at Chichijima and Hahajima from Guam with occasional trips to Japan or Hong Kong.

On 25 July 1965 Banner departed Guam for the Puget Sound Naval Shipyard where from August to October 1965 she was converted to an "environmental research ship." In reality, the ship was converted to a SIGINT platform. Banner returned to Japan in 1966 operating out of Yokosuka where she was redesignated AGER-1 on 1 June 1967.

Banner operated with USS Pueblo (AGER-2) and USS Palm Beach (AGER-3) gathering signals intelligence for the remainder of her career. In mid-1969 Banner was found unfit for further service and decommissioned at Yokosuka, Japan, on 14 November 1969 and struck from the Naval Vessel Register on the same day. The ship was sold for scrapping on 5 June 1970 to Mitsui & Co., Tadotsu, Japan.

== Former seamen ==
- Nathaniel M. Gorton, federal judge

== Bibliography ==
- Coast Guard Historian's Office (17 November 2014). "World War II Coast Guard-Manned U.S. Army Freight and Supply Ship Histories". United States Coast Guard.
- Colton, T. (28 November 2012). "U.S. Army Coastal Freighters (F, FS)". Shipbuilding History. T. Colton.
- Naval History And Heritage Command. "Banner II (AKL-25)". Dictionary of American Naval Fighting Ships. Naval History And Heritage Command.
- USS Pueblo Veteran's Association. "US Navy AGER Program". USS Pueblo Veteran's Association.
