= USS Palm Beach =

Banner-class environmental research ship of the United States Navy

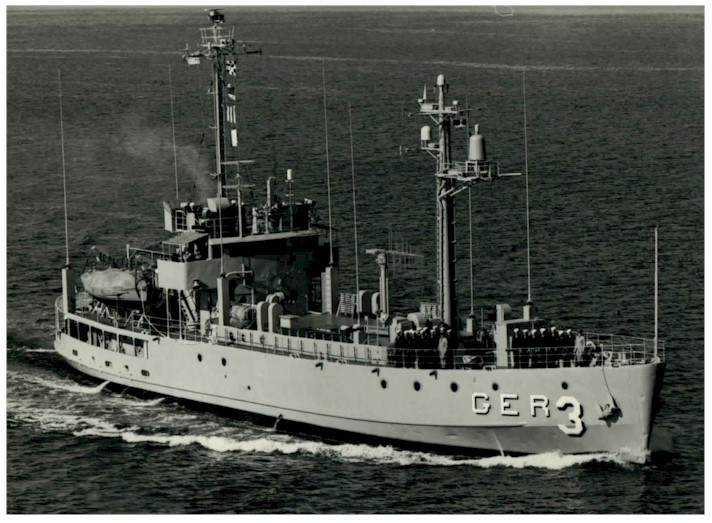

History

United States

U.S. Army service:
- Name: FS-217; Colonel Armond Peterson
- Builder: Higgins Industries, New Orleans, Louisiana
- In service: December 1944
- Out of service: Placed in reserve 17 February 1956

U.S. Navy service:
- Name: USS Palm Beach (AGER-3)
- Acquired: 18 June 1966
- Identification: IMO number: 8836089
- Fate: Sunk as Diving Wreck

General characteristics
- Type: Design 427 coastal freighter
- Displacement: 693 long tons (704 t)
- Length: 180 ft (55 m)
- Beam: 33 ft (10 m)
- Draft: 10 ft (3.0 m)
- Propulsion: 2 500hp GM Cleveland Division 6-278A 6 cyl V6 Diesel engines, twin screws
- Speed: 13 knots (24 km/h; 15 mph)
- Complement: 42 as AKL, 83 as AGER
- Armament: Two M2HB 0.5 in (12.7 mm) HMG's

USS Palm Beach (AGER-3) was a former Army Auxiliary Aircraft Repair Ship converted to an electronic and signals intelligence ship of the United States Navy.

== Service history ==
She was laid down as FS-217 one of the 18 specialized Design 427 variants of the Army Freight and Supply type, officially Vessel, Supply, Aircraft Repair, Diesel, Steel, 180', at Higgins Industries in New Orleans. FS-217 was delivered to the US Army Transportation Corps operation under technical control of the United States Army Air Forces in December 1944. At some point, after delivery, the Army Air Forces named the repair vessels with FS-217 being named Colonel Armond Peterson. (Note: Only the USAAF named the FS types, though some of the others gained names after the war.) The ship was first based in San Francisco, but later engaged in coastal surveys off the Lesser Antilles and coast of Central America. The ship was based at Balboa, Canal Zone before being placed in reserve status on 17 February 1956.

Colonel Armond Peterson was acquired and converted by the United States Navy and redesignated as Light Cargo Ship Palm Beach (AKL-45) on 18 June 1966. She was converted to a Banner class environmental research ship at Puget Sound Naval Shipyard and reclassified as AGER-3. The Palm Beach was commissioned on 13 October 1967 and served two years as an ELINT/SIGINT ship, deploying in the Mediterranean and in the North Sea. She was decommissioned and later struck on 1 December 1969. She was sold to a private owner, then resold to a Panamanian company and renamed MV Oro Verde. The ship was eventually involved in drug smuggling and ran aground in the Cayman Islands. She was sunk by the Cayman Islands government as a SCUBA dive wreck.

== Bibliography ==
- Frampton, Viktor & Morison, Samuel Loring (1991). "Question 41/89". Warship International. XXVIII (1). International Naval Research Organization: 83–84. ISSN 0043-0374.
- Grover, David (1987). U.S. Army Ships and Watercraft of World War II. Naval Institute Press. ISBN 0-87021-766-6. LCCN 87015514.
- Jackson, Ramon (23 January 2012). "Army FP/FS Vessels". Army Ships – The Ghost Fleet. Archived from the original on 12 February 2012.
- Naval History And Heritage Command (7 January 2015). "Palm Beach". Dictionary of American Naval Fighting Ships. Naval History And Heritage Command.
- NavSource Online (25 April 2014). "USS Palm Beach (AGER-3)". NavSource.
