= Victorious War Museum =

North Korean history and military museum in Pyongyang

Victorious Fatherland Liberation War Museum
- 조국해방전쟁승리기념관
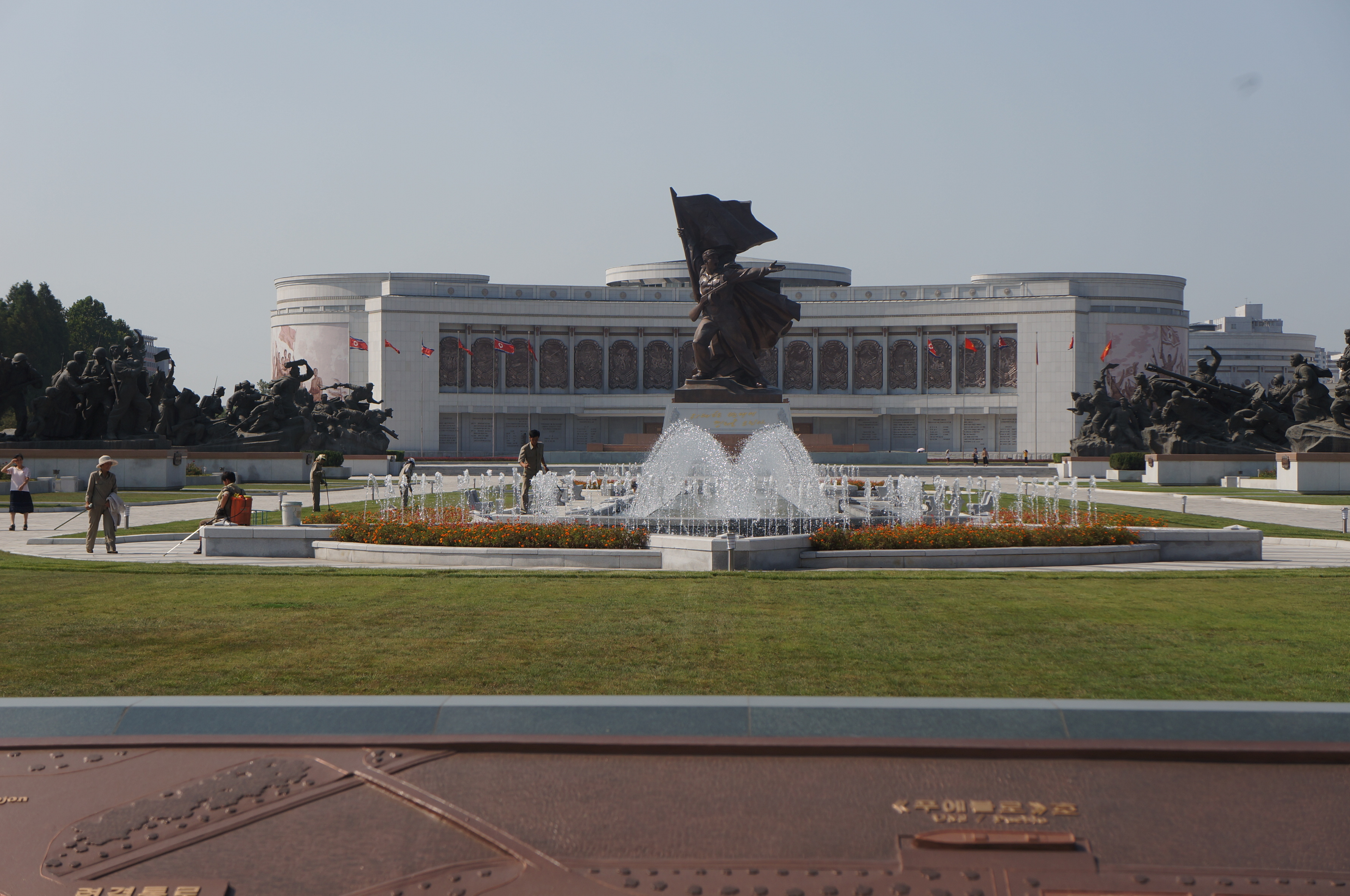
- The main entrance of the Victorious War Museum

- Location within North Korea
- Established: April 1974 (current location)
- Coordinates: 39°02′18″N 125°44′26″E
- Public transit access: Hyŏksin: Kŏnsŏl

The Victorious Fatherland Liberation War Museum is a history and military museum dedicated to the Korean War located in North Korea's capital of Pyongyang.

The museum was first set up in August 1953 and built in the Central District of Pyongyang, initially named as the "Fatherland Liberation War Museum." In April 1963, it was relocated to the Sosong District and re-established in a purpose-built building compound.

In 2014, the museum was renovated and upgraded significantly and the new design included a building spanning across the nearby Botong River, together with a large panorama-style display hall at the top.

== Exhibits ==
The general character and influence of the museum reflects the North Korean view of their 'success in fighting against their American arch-enemy and its puppet state of South Korea', and much of the museum presents the victories of North Korea and its military over its enemies, which are shown to be 'utterly defeated and broken by the might of North Korea'. Such can be seen from how a display in the museum shows a large cache of captured US infantry-based weapons and combat-helmets stacked up, presenting the idea of the severe casualties sustained by the US military in the Korean War.

Exhibits in the museum include a 360-degree full-scale diorama and cyclorama of the Battle of Taejon during the Korean War, along with displays of North Korean military hardware used in that conflict, such as Soviet T-34/85 tanks, anti-aircraft artillery, naval craft as well as warplanes. Also on display are several captured American (and some British) military equipment, such as ex-US M26 Pershing, M4 Sherman and M24 Chaffee tanks, a former British Army Universal Carrier armoured personnel carrier (APC), along with some artillery guns and downed aircraft of the US-led UN forces fighting against North Korea. In addition to the many statues, figures, murals and artifacts in the museum, one major exhibit is USS Pueblo, a US Navy vessel that was captured by North Korea when it allegedly entered North Korean territorial waters in January 1968. Local and foreign visitors to the museum are allowed to board the ship, now permanently moored on the river beside the museum, and enter and see the ship's secret code-room (which contains classified military intelligence and information on board) and former ship and crew artifacts now put on display, such as a US flag.

Images from the museum
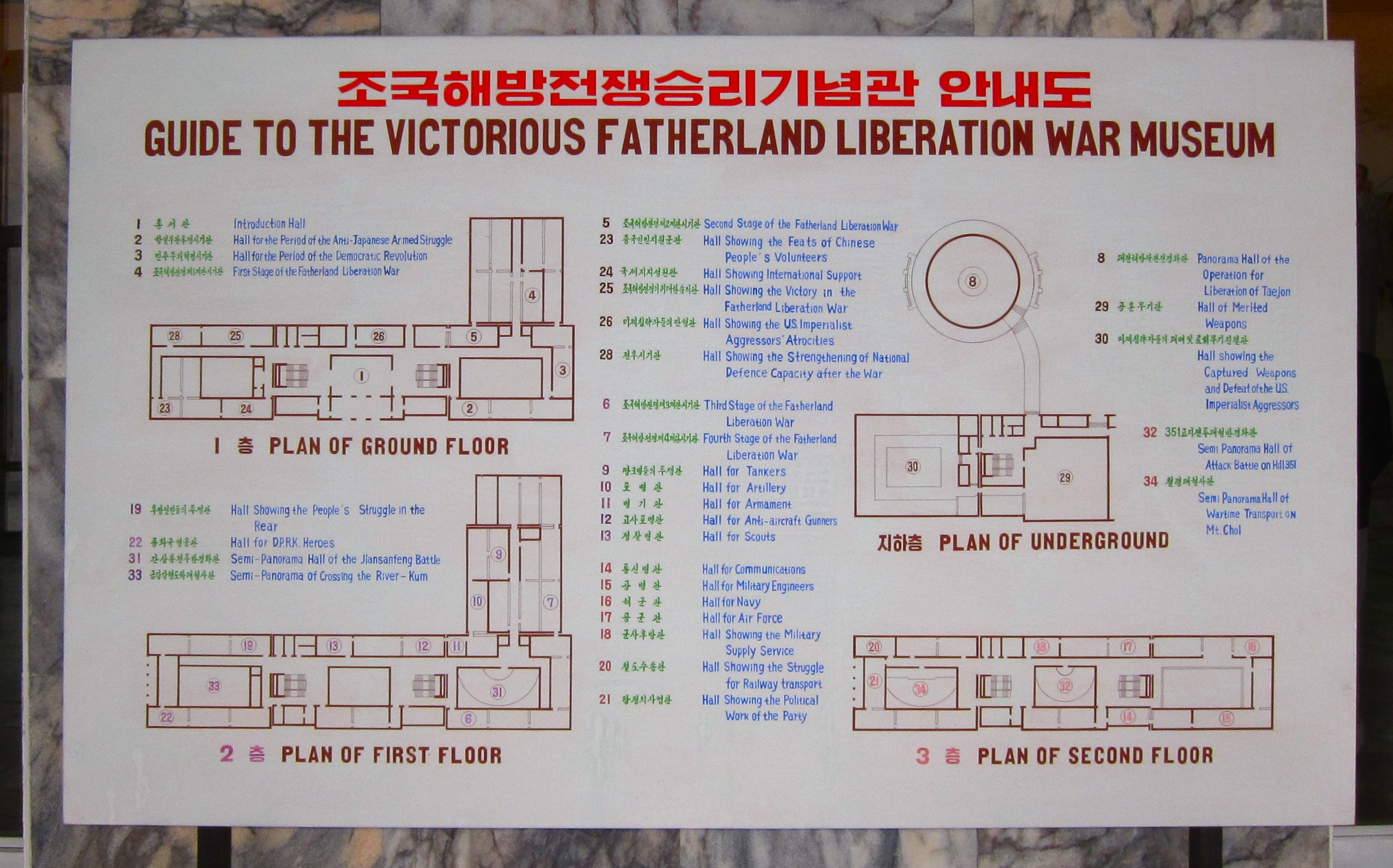
A guide-diagram showing the ways around the Victorious Fatherland Liberation War Museum in Pyongyang.

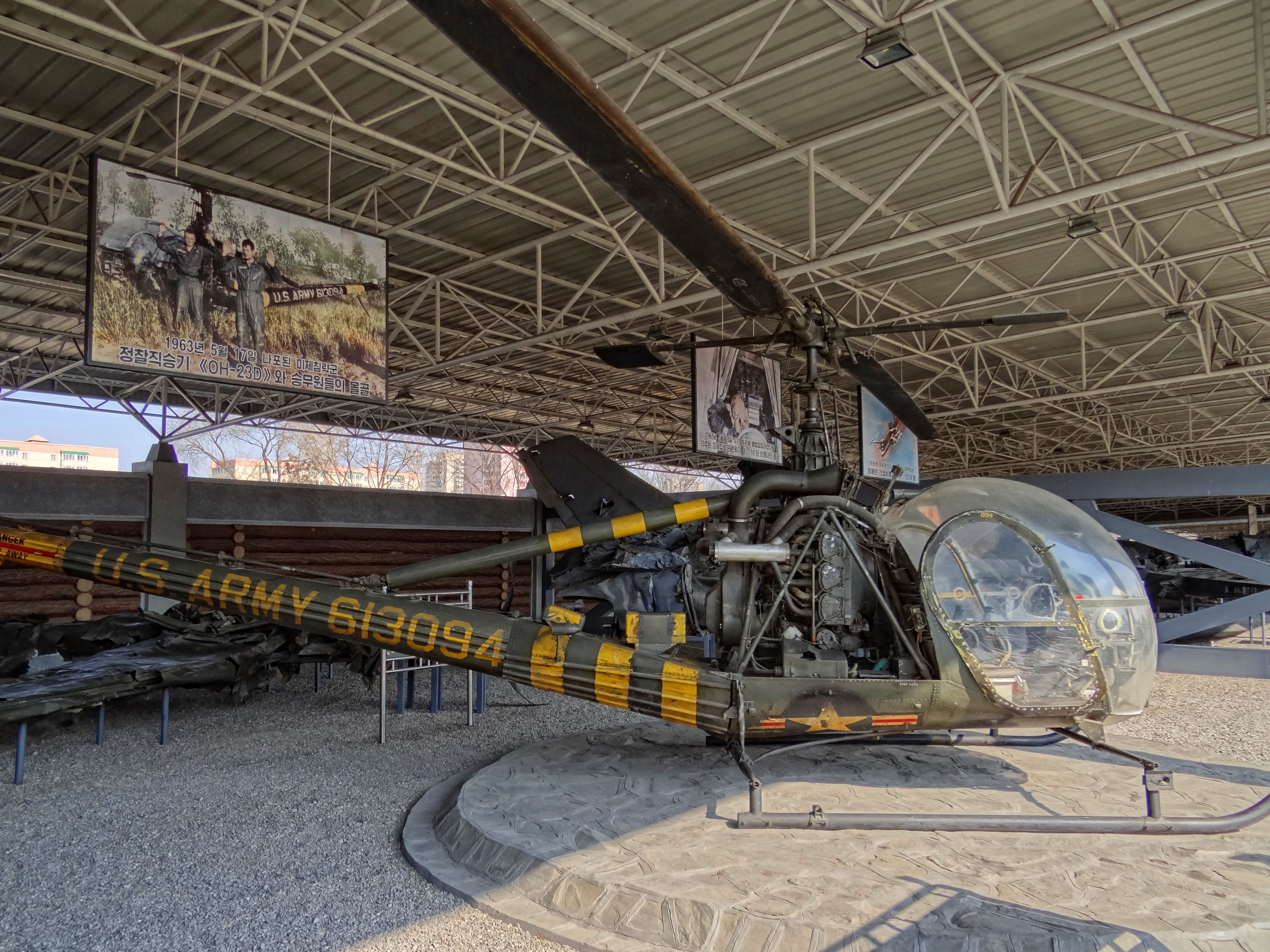
A US Army OH-23 Raven helicopter captured by the North Korean military in 1963.

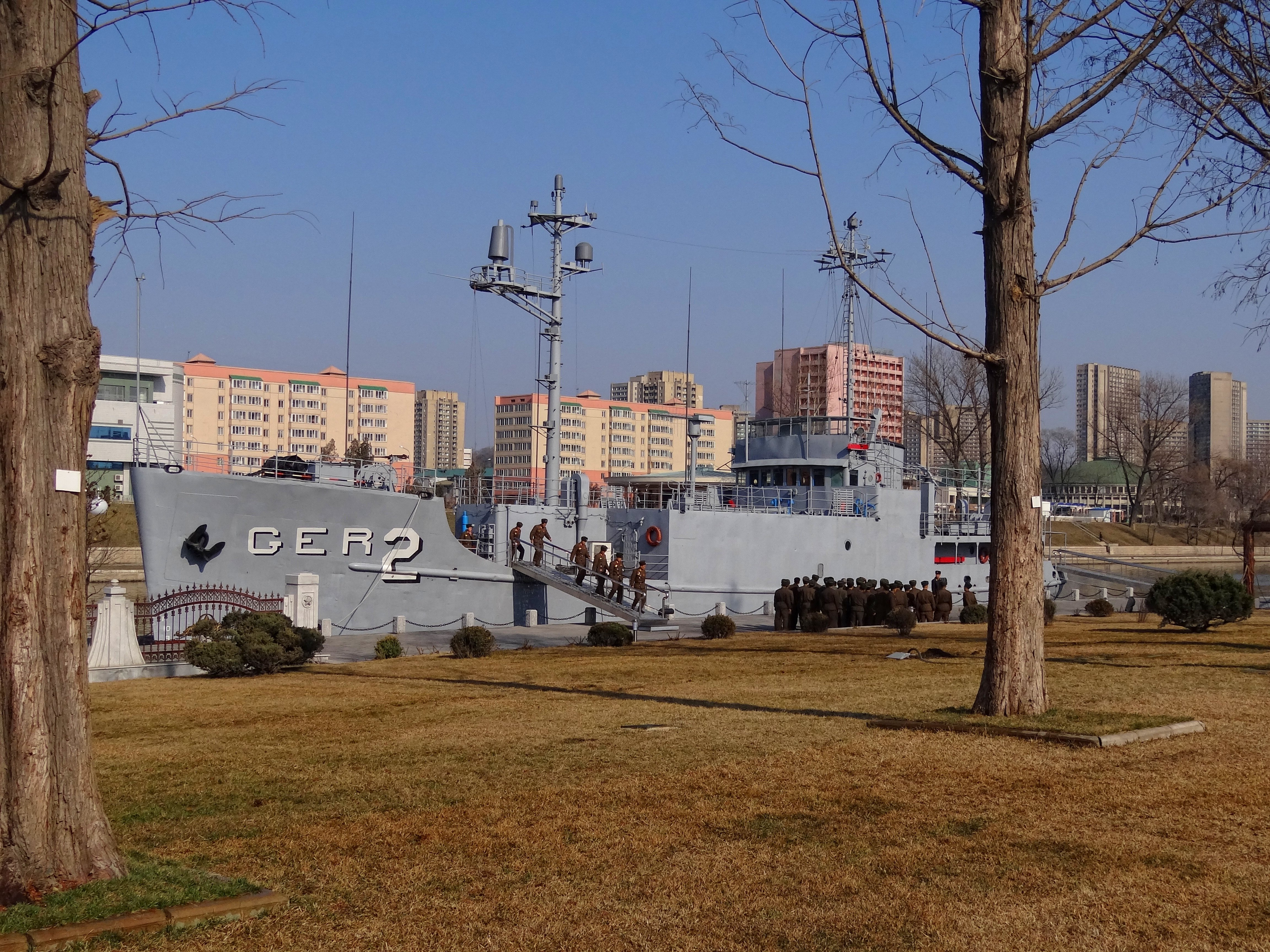
USS Pueblo, which was seized by North Korea in January 1968.

== Alleged sinking of USS Baltimore ==
The museum has several exhibits that claim that the U.S. Navy heavy cruiser USS Baltimore was sunk by Motor Torpedo Boats belonging to the Korean People's Navy on 2 July 1950. Exhibits include a poster and the torpedo boat which supposedly sank the American cruiser. However, the cruiser, at the time of its alleged loss, was still in the U.S. Navy's decommissioned reserve, and had been as such since 1946. In 1951, it was recommissioned and assigned to the Atlantic Fleet. In 1955, Baltimore was transferred to the Pacific Fleet two years after the Korean War. Clearly, the ship was nowhere near Korea during the three years of conflict there.

The actual battle involved light cruiser USS Juneau as well as the Royal Navy's sloop HMS Black Swan and cruiser HMS Jamaica. Together, they destroyed several (at least 3) North Korean torpedo boats without suffering losses or damage.

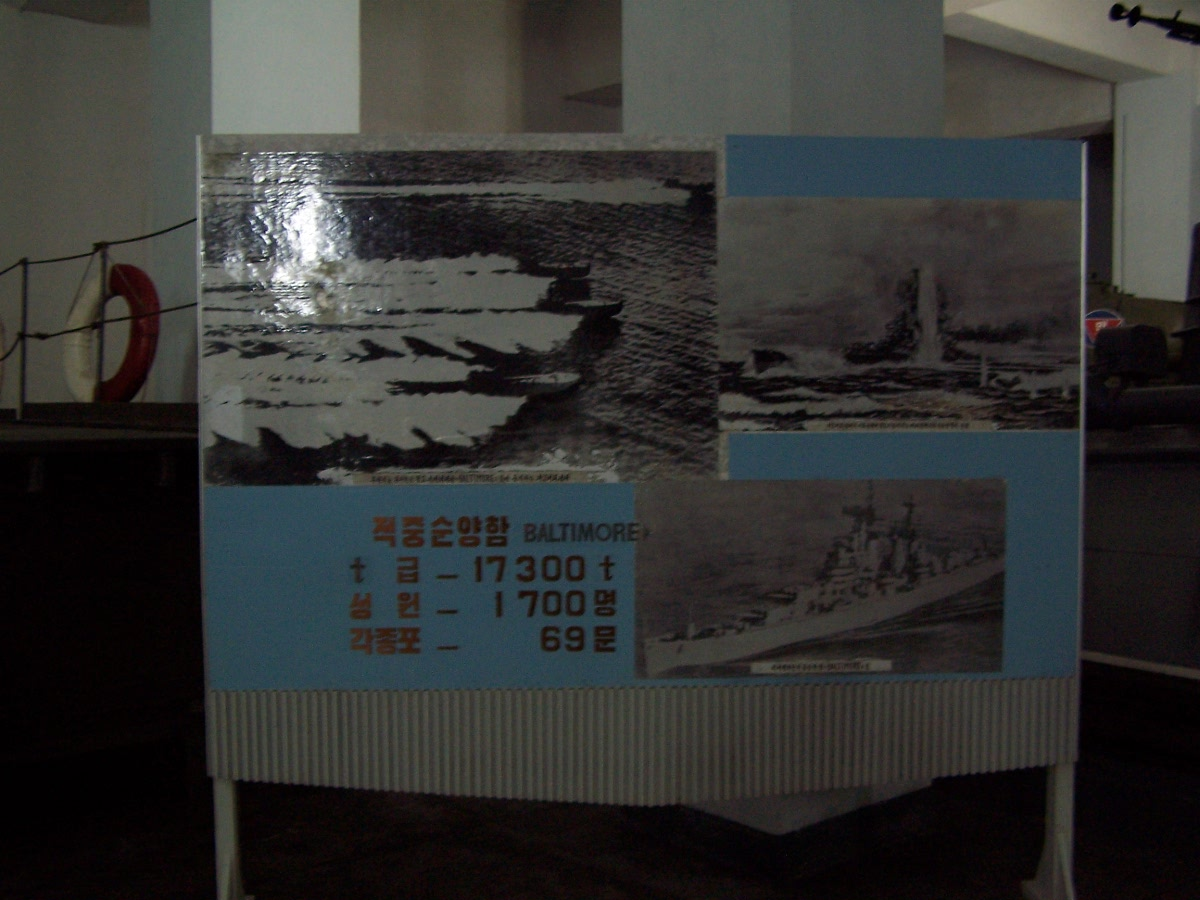
The North Korean propaganda poster proclaiming the sinking of USS Baltimore.

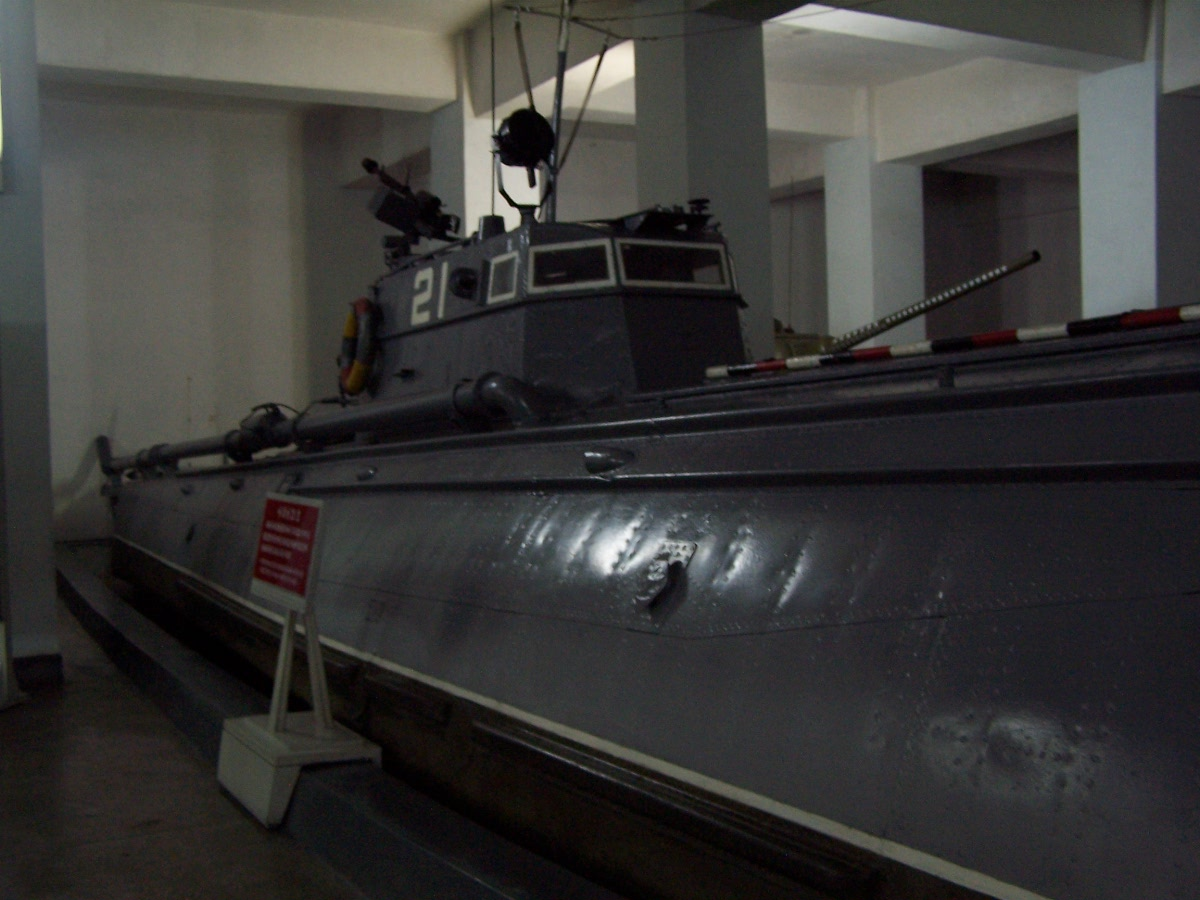
The North Korean torpedo boat, No. 21, that supposedly sunk the heavy cruiser Baltimore.

== See also ==
- List of museums in North Korea
- War Memorial of Korea, Seoul, its South Korean counterpart
