= USS Pueblo (AGER-2) =

Ship attacked and captured by North Korea

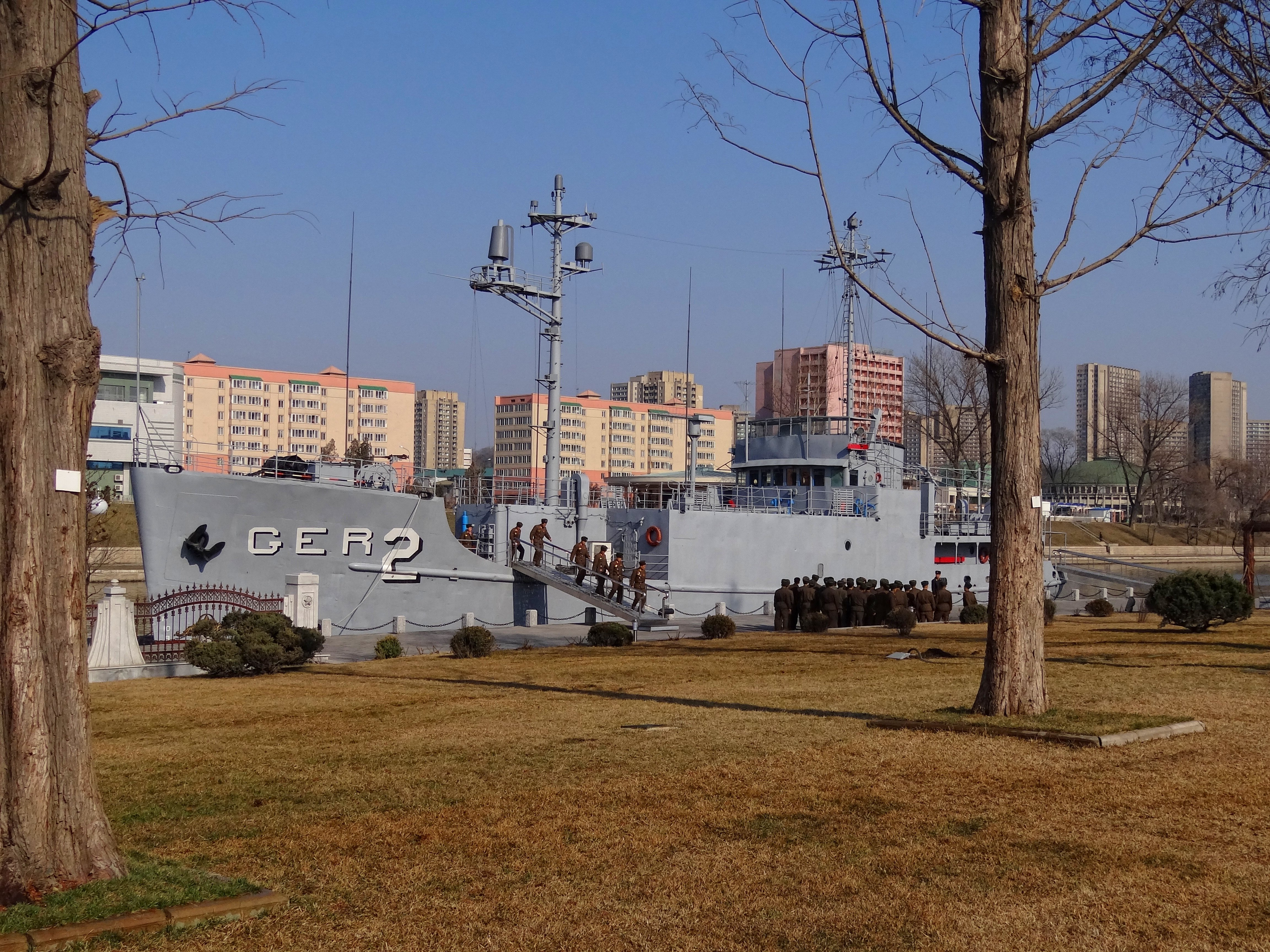
- Pueblo in North Korea, 2014

History

United States
- Name: Pueblo
- Namesake: Pueblo, Colorado and Pueblo County, Colorado
- Builder: Kewaunee Shipbuilding and Engineering
- Laid down: 1944
- Launched: 16 April 1944
- Commissioned: 7 April 1945
- In service: 1945
- Reclassified: 18 June 1966: AKL-44; 13 May 1967: AGER-2
- Honors and awards: National Defense Service Medal; Korean Defense Service Medal; Combat Action Ribbon (retroactive)
- Captured: 23 January 1968
- Fate: Captured by North Korea; 39°2′26″N 125°44′23″E
- Status: Active, in commission (held by North Korea as a museum ship)
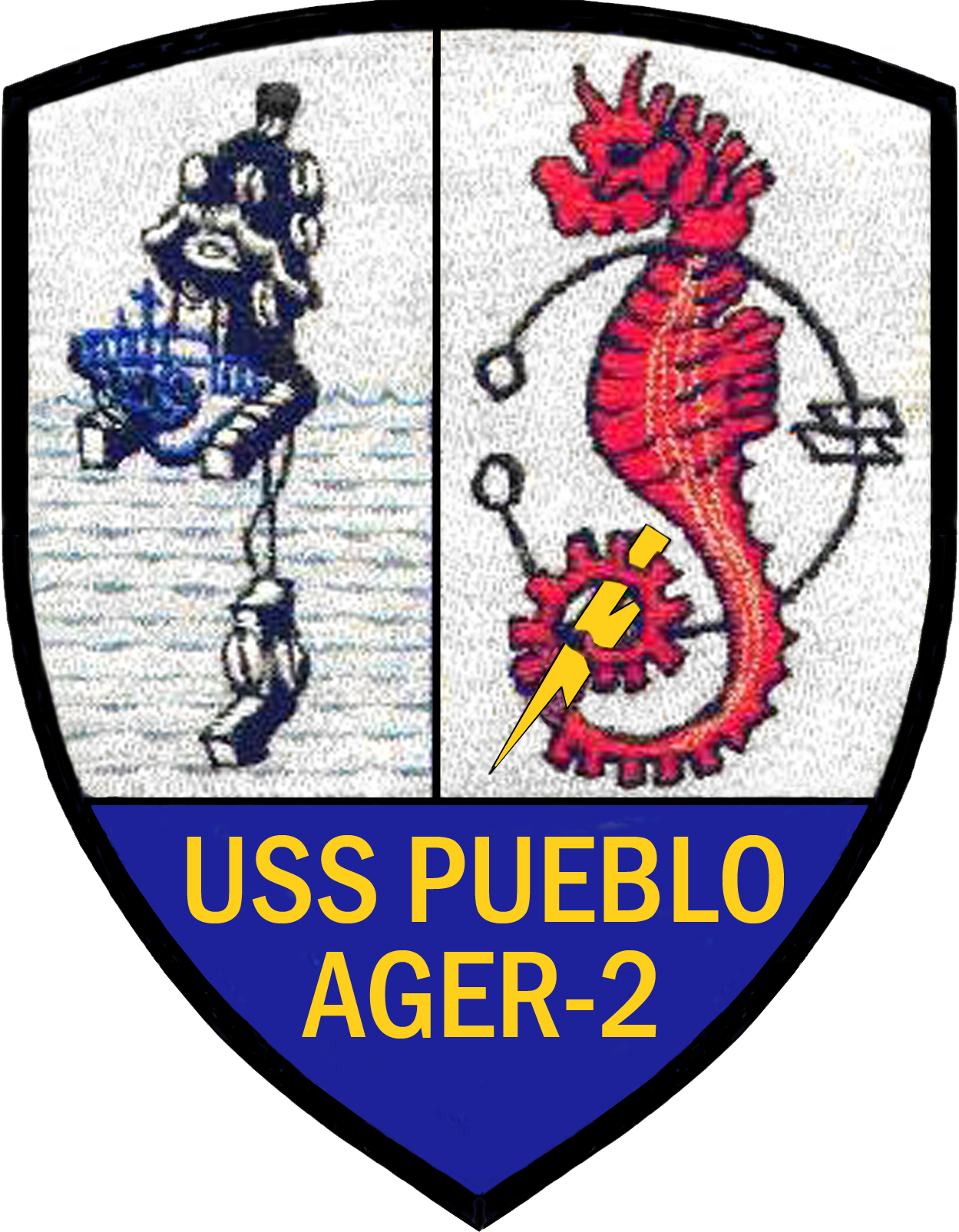
- Badge

General characteristics
- Class & type: (as built) Army Freight and Supply (FS); Navy Camano-class cargo ship (AKL); (as converted) Banner-class environmental research ship
- Type: (as built) Light Cargo Ship; (as converted) Intel-Gathering Vessel
- Tonnage: 345 tons dwt
- Displacement: 550 tons light, 895 tons full
- Length: 177 ft (54 m)
- Beam: 32 ft (9.8 m)
- Draft: 9 ft (2.7 m)
- Propulsion: two 500hp GM Cleveland Division 6-278A 6-cyl V6 Diesel engines
- Speed: 12.7 knots (23.5 km/h; 14.6 mph)
- Complement: 6 officers, 70 men
- Armament: 2 × M2 Browning .50 cal. (12.7×99 mm) machine guns

USS Pueblo (AGER-2) is a Banner-class technical research ship, placed into service during World War II, then converted to a spy ship in 1967 by the United States Navy. She gathered intelligence and oceanographic information, monitoring electronic and radio signals from North Korea. On 23 January 1968, the ship was attacked and captured by a North Korean vessel, in what became known as the "Pueblo incident".

The seizure of the U.S. Navy ship and her 83 crew members, one of whom was killed in the attack, came less than a week after President Lyndon B. Johnson's State of the Union address to the United States Congress, a week before the start of the Tet Offensive in South Vietnam during the Vietnam War and three days after 31 men of North Korea's KPA Unit 124 had crossed the Korean Demilitarized Zone (DMZ) and killed 26 South Koreans and 4 Americans in an attempt to attack the South Korean Blue House (executive mansion) in the capital Seoul. The taking of Pueblo and the abuse and torture of her crew during the next eleven months became a major Cold War incident, raising tensions between western and eastern powers.

North Korea stated that Pueblo deliberately entered their territorial waters 7.6 nautical miles (14 km) away from Ryo Island, and that the logbook shows that they intruded several times. However, the United States maintained that the vessel was in international waters at the time of the incident and that any purported evidence supplied by North Korea to support its statements was fabricated. Pueblo remains held in North Korea, officially a commissioned vessel of the United States Navy.

Since early 2013, the ship has been moored along the Pothonggang Canal in Pyongyang and is displayed there as a museum ship at the Victorious War Museum. Pueblo is the only ship of the U.S. Navy still on the commissioned roster and held captive.

== Initial operations ==
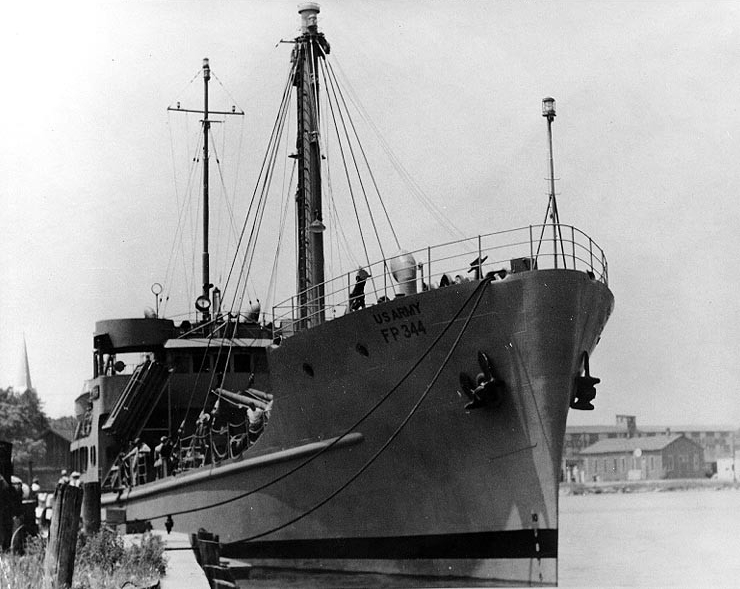
U.S. Army Cargo Vessel FP-344 (1944). Transferred to the Navy in 1966, she became USS Pueblo (AGER-2)

The ship was launched at the Kewaunee Shipbuilding and Engineering Company in Kewaunee, Wisconsin, on 16 April 1944, as the United States Army Freight and Passenger (FP) FP-344. The Army later redesignated the FP vessels as Freight and Supply changing the designation to FS-344. The ship, commissioned at New Orleans on 7 April 1945, served as a Coast Guard–manned Army vessel used for training civilians for the Army. Her first commanding officer was Lt. J. R. Choate, USCGR, succeeded by Lt. J.G. Marvin B. Barker, USCGR, on 12 September 1945. FS-344 was placed out of service in 1954.

In 1964 the Department of Defense became interested in having smaller, less expensive, more flexible and responsive signals intelligence collection vessels than the existing AGTR and T-AG vessels. The mothballed light cargo ships were the most suitable existing DOD ships, and one was converted to USS Banner in 1964 and began operations in 1965. Banner's mission was to surveil high-frequency electronic emissions with line-of-sight propagation requiring operating closer to shore than previous intelligence gathering missions. Banner was unarmed, but the crew were issued five M1911 pistols and three M1 Garand rifles. Banner was confronted by Soviet Navy ships while operating off the Pacific coast of the Soviet Union. These ships would sometimes display international signal flags meaning: "Heave to or I will fire," but Banner kept steaming with scrupulous attention to International Regulations for Preventing Collisions at Sea. Soviet recognition of possible American reciprocity against Soviet ships on similar missions discouraged attacks.

FS-344 was transferred to the United States Navy on 12 April 1966 and was renamed USS Pueblo (AKL-44) after Pueblo and Pueblo County, Colorado on 18 June. Initially, she was classified as a light cargo ship for basic refitting at Puget Sound Naval Shipyard during 1966. As Pueblo was prepared under a non-secret cover as a light cargo ship, the general crew staffing and training was on this basis, with 44% having never been to sea when first assigned. Installation of signals intelligence equipment, at a cost of $1.5 million, was delayed to 1967 for budgetary reasons, resuming service as what is colloquially known as a "spy ship" and redesignated AGER-2 on 13 May 1967. The limited budget for conversion caused disapproval of several improvements requested by the prospective commanding officer, Lloyd Bucher. Requested engine overhaul was denied despite Banner's experience of drifting for two days unable to communicate following failure of both engines on patrol. A requested emergency scuttling system was denied, and Bucher was subsequently unable to obtain explosives for demolition charges. Replacement of burn barrels with a fuel-fed incinerator to allow speedy destruction of classified documents was denied. After Bucher's subsequent request to reduce the ship's library of classified publications was similarly denied, he was able to purchase a less capable incinerator using some discretionary funds intended for crew comfort. Following the USS Liberty incident on 8 June, Vice Chief of Naval Operations (VCNO) Horacio Rivero Jr. ordered that no Navy ship would operate without adequate means of defending itself. VCNO staff directed the shipyard to install a 3-inch/50-caliber gun on Pueblo's main deck with provisions for ammunition storage, but Bucher successfully argued against such installation because of reduced ship stability by addition of weight above the main deck. After testing and deficiency rework Pueblo sailed from the shipyard on 11 September 1967 to San Diego for shake-down training.

When the unarmed Pueblo reached the U.S. Navy base at Yokosuka, Japan, the commander of United States Naval Forces Japan directed the ship to take two M2 Browning .50 caliber machine guns as a substitute for the missing deck gun. In the limited time available for training, ten of the ship's crew fired five rounds each. Bucher opted to mount these guns in exposed positions on the bow and stern to keep them as far as possible from his position on the bridge. These positions eliminated possible use of the ship's superstructure to protect the gunners and conceal the guns and ammunition service lockers. The exposed guns, with no nearby ammunition supply, were disguised under canvas covers which became rigid with frozen spray.

== Pueblo incident ==
Pueblo incident
- Part of the Korean DMZ Conflict and the Korean conflict
Date	20–23 January 1968
Location	Sea of Japan
Result	North Korean victory

Belligerents
United States	North Korea

Commanders and leaders
(United States) Lloyd M. Bucher	(North Korea) Kim Il-chol

Strength
1 Spy ship	2 Fishing trawlers 2 Submarine chasers 4 Torpedo boats 2 MiG-21 fighters

Casualties and losses
1 killed 9 wounded 82 captured	None

On 5 January 1968, Pueblo left Yokosuka in transit to the U.S. naval base at Sasebo, Japan; from there she left on 11 January 1968, headed northward through the Tsushima Strait into the Sea of Japan. She left with specific orders to intercept and conduct surveillance of Soviet Navy activity in the Tsushima Strait and to gather signal and electronic intelligence from North Korea. Mission planners failed to recognize that the absence of similar North Korean missions around the United States would free North Korea from the possibility of retribution in kind which had restrained Soviet response. The declassified SIGAD for the National Security Agency (NSA) Direct Support Unit (DSU) from the Naval Security Group (NSG) on Pueblo during the patrol involved in the incident was USN-467Y. AGER (Auxiliary General Environmental Research) denoted a joint Naval and National Security Agency (NSA) program. Aboard were the ship's crew of five officers and 38 enlisted men, one officer and 37 enlisted men of the NSG, and two civilian oceanographers to provide a cover story.

On 16 January 1968, Pueblo arrived at the 42°N parallel in preparation for the patrol, which was to transit down the North Korean coast from 41°N to 39°N, and then back, without getting closer than 13 nautical miles (24 km) from the North Korean coast, at night moving out to a distance of 18 to 20 nautical miles (33 to 37 km). This was challenging as only two sailors had good navigational experience, with the captain later reporting, "I did not have a highly professional group of seamen to do my navigational chores for me."

At 17:30 on 20 January 1968, a North Korean modified SO-1 class Soviet style submarine chaser passed within 4,000 yards (3.7 km) of Pueblo, which was about 15.4 nautical miles (28.5 km) southeast of Mayang-do at a position 39°47'N and 128°28.5'E.

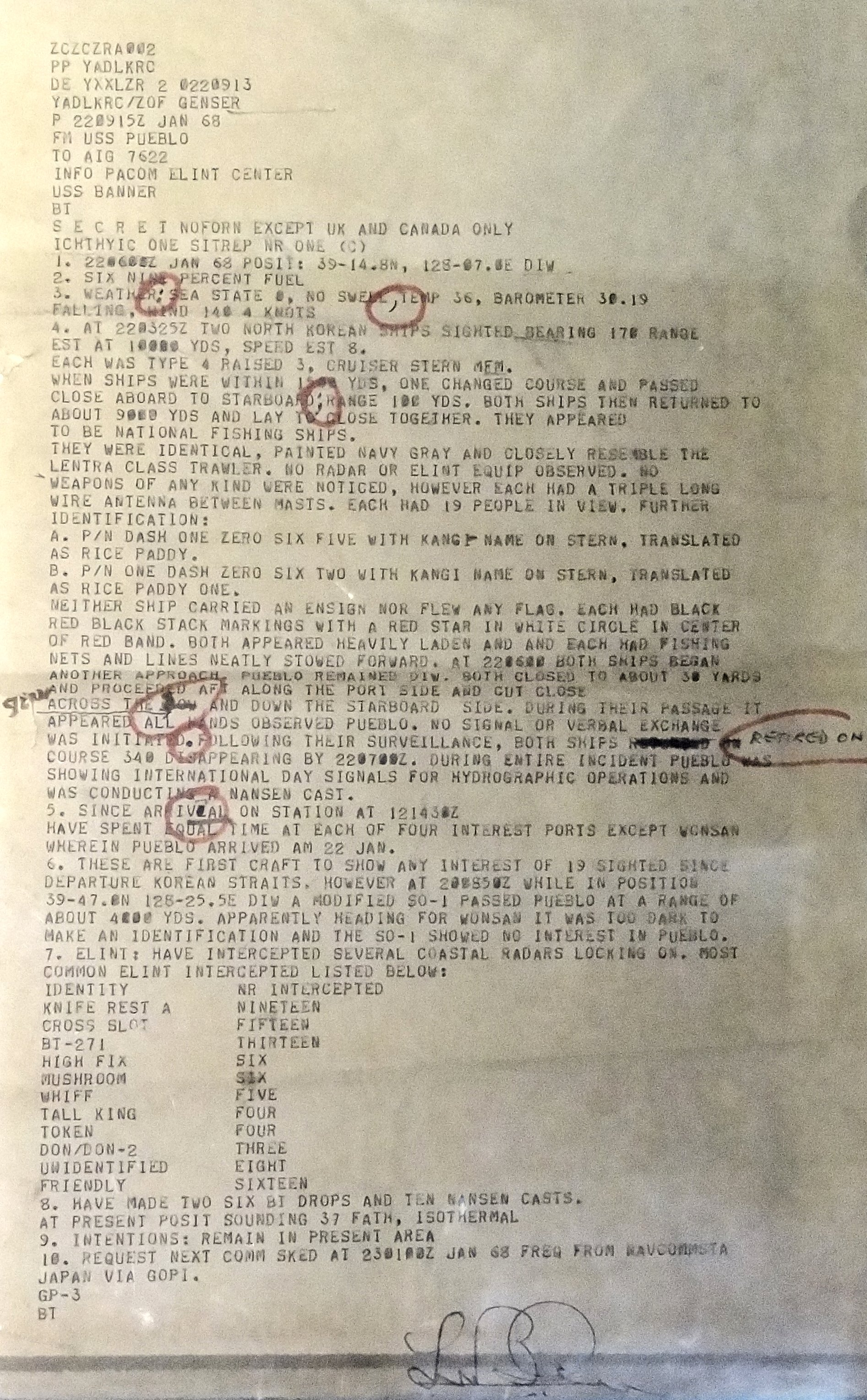
Intelligence report made by USS Pueblo related to the incident.

In the afternoon of 22 January 1968, the two North Korean fishing trawlers Rice Paddy 1 and Rice Paddy 2 passed within 30 yards (27 m) of Pueblo. That day, a North Korean KPA Special Operations Force unit made an assassination attempt at the Blue House executive mansion against South Korean president Park Chung Hee, but the crew of Pueblo was not informed.

According to the American account, the following day, 23 January, Pueblo was approached by a submarine chaser and her nationality was challenged; Pueblo responded by raising the U.S. flag and directing the civilian oceanographers to commence water sampling procedures with their deck winch. The North Korean vessel then ordered Pueblo to stand down or be fired upon. Pueblo attempted to maneuver away, but was considerably slower than the submarine chaser. Several warning shots were fired. Additionally, three torpedo boats appeared on the horizon and then joined in the chase and subsequent attack.

The attackers were soon joined by two Korean People's Air Force MiG-21 fighters. A fourth torpedo boat and a second submarine chaser appeared on the horizon a short time later. The ammunition on Pueblo was stored below decks, and her machine guns were wrapped in cold-weather tarpaulins. The machine guns were unmanned, and no attempt was made to man them. An NSA report quotes the sailing order:

( ... ) Defensive armament (machine guns) should be stowed or covered in such manner so that it does not cause unusual interest by surveyed units. It should be used only in the event of a threat to survival ( ... )

and notes:

In practice, it was discovered that, because of the temperamental adjustments of the firing mechanisms, the .50-caliber machine guns took at least ten minutes to activate. Only one crew member, with former army experience, had ever had any experience with such weapons, although members of the crew had received rudimentary instructions on the weapons immediately prior to the ship's deployment.

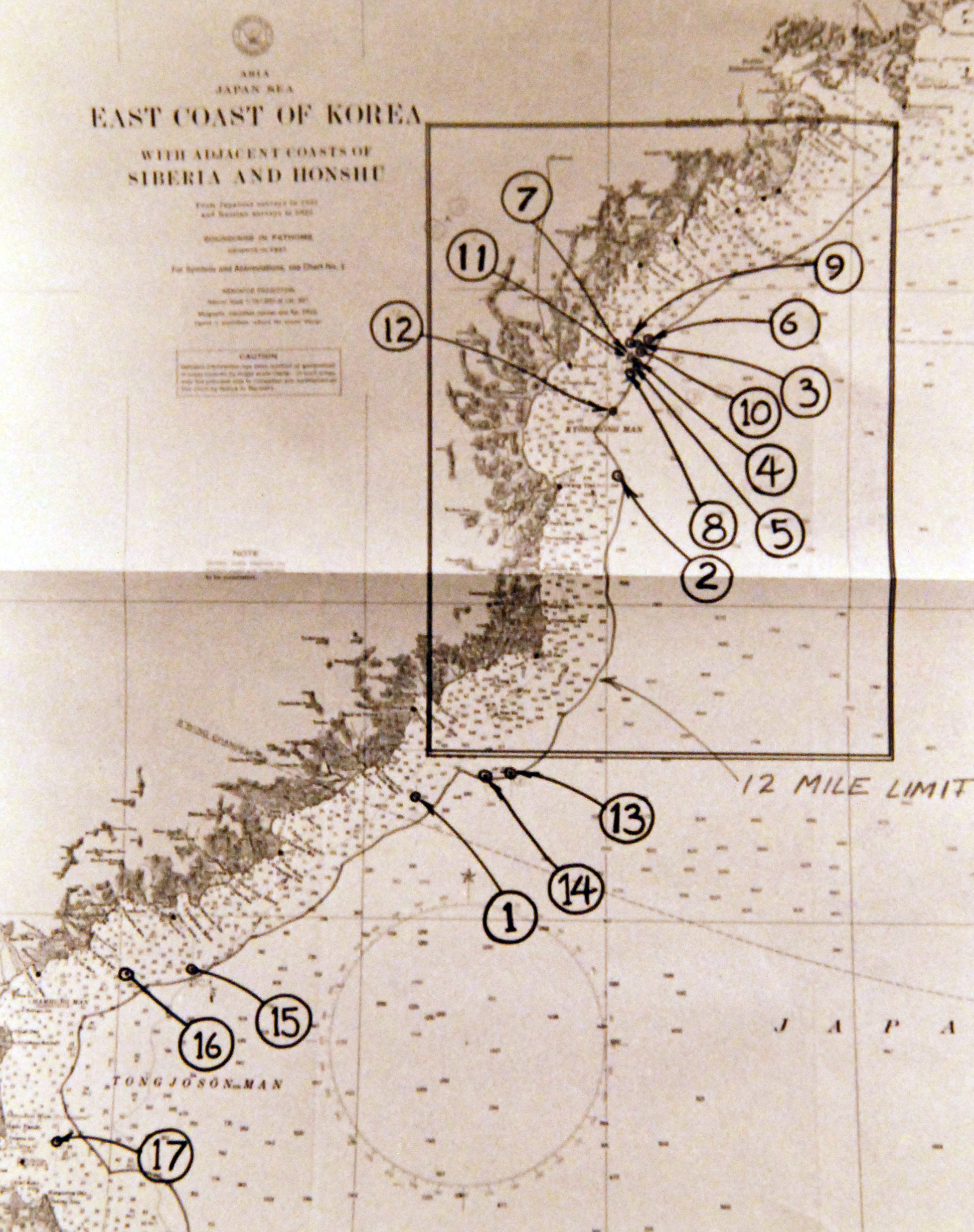
Chart showing the 17 locations North Korea reported Pueblo had entered their 12 nautical miles (22 km) territorial waters

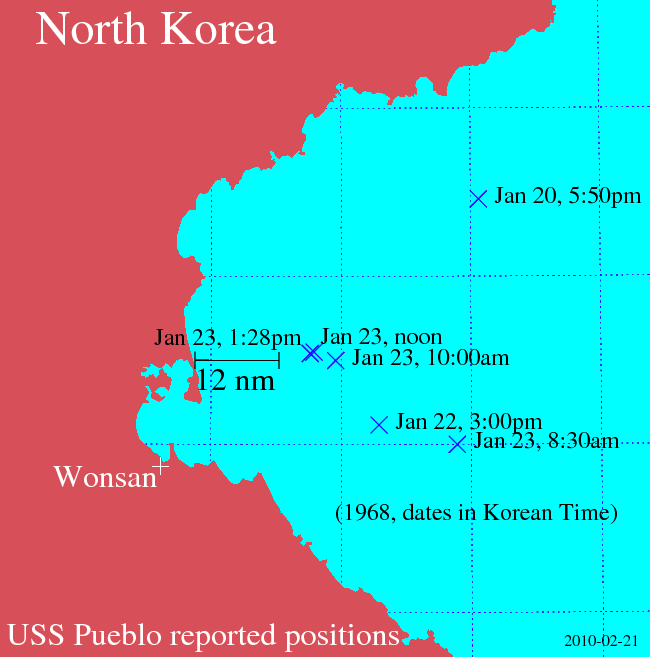
Positions of Pueblo reported by the U.S. Navy

U.S. Navy authorities and the crew of Pueblo insist that before the capture, Pueblo was miles outside North Korean territorial waters. North Korea claims that the vessel was well within North Korean territory. The Pueblo's mission statement allowed her to approach within a nautical mile (1,852 m) of that limit. However, North Korea describes a 50-nautical-mile (93 km) sea boundary even though international standards were 12 nautical miles (22 km) at the time.

The North Korean vessels attempted to board Pueblo, but she was maneuvered to prevent this for over two hours. The submarine chaser then opened fire with a 57 mm cannon and the smaller vessels fired machine guns, injuring Signalman Leach in his left calf and upper right side. Captain Bucher, too, received slight shrapnel wounds, but they were not incapacitating. The crew of Pueblo then began destroying sensitive material. The volume of material on board was so great that it was impossible to destroy it all. An NSA report quotes Lieutenant Steve Harris, the officer in charge of Pueblo's Naval Security Group Command detachment:

( ... ) we had retained on board the obsolete publications and had all good intentions of getting rid of these things but had not done so at the time we had started the mission. I wanted to get the place organized eventually and we had excessive numbers of copies on board ( ... )

and concludes:

Only a small percentage of the total classified material aboard the ship was destroyed.

Radio contact between Pueblo and the Naval Security Group in Kamiseya, Japan had been ongoing during the incident. As a result, Seventh Fleet command was fully aware of Pueblo's situation. Air cover was promised but never arrived. The Fifth Air Force had no aircraft on strip alert, and estimated a two-to-three-hour delay in launching aircraft. USS Enterprise was located 510 nautical miles (940 km) south of Pueblo, yet her four F-4B aircraft on alert were not equipped for an air-to-surface engagement. Enterprise's captain estimated that 1.5 hours (90 minutes) were required to get the converted aircraft into the air.

Eventually the shelling forced Pueblo to stop, signal compliance, and follow the North Korean vessels as ordered. Pueblo stopped again immediately outside North Korean waters in an attempt to obtain more time for destroying sensitive material, but was immediately fired upon by the submarine chaser, and a sailor, fireman Duane Hodges, was killed, after which Pueblo resumed following the North Korean vessels. The ship was finally boarded at 05:55 UTC (2:55 pm local) by men from a torpedo boat and the submarine chaser. Crew members had their hands tied and were blindfolded, beaten, and prodded with bayonets. Once Pueblo was in North Korean territorial waters, she was boarded again, this time by high-ranking North Korean officials.

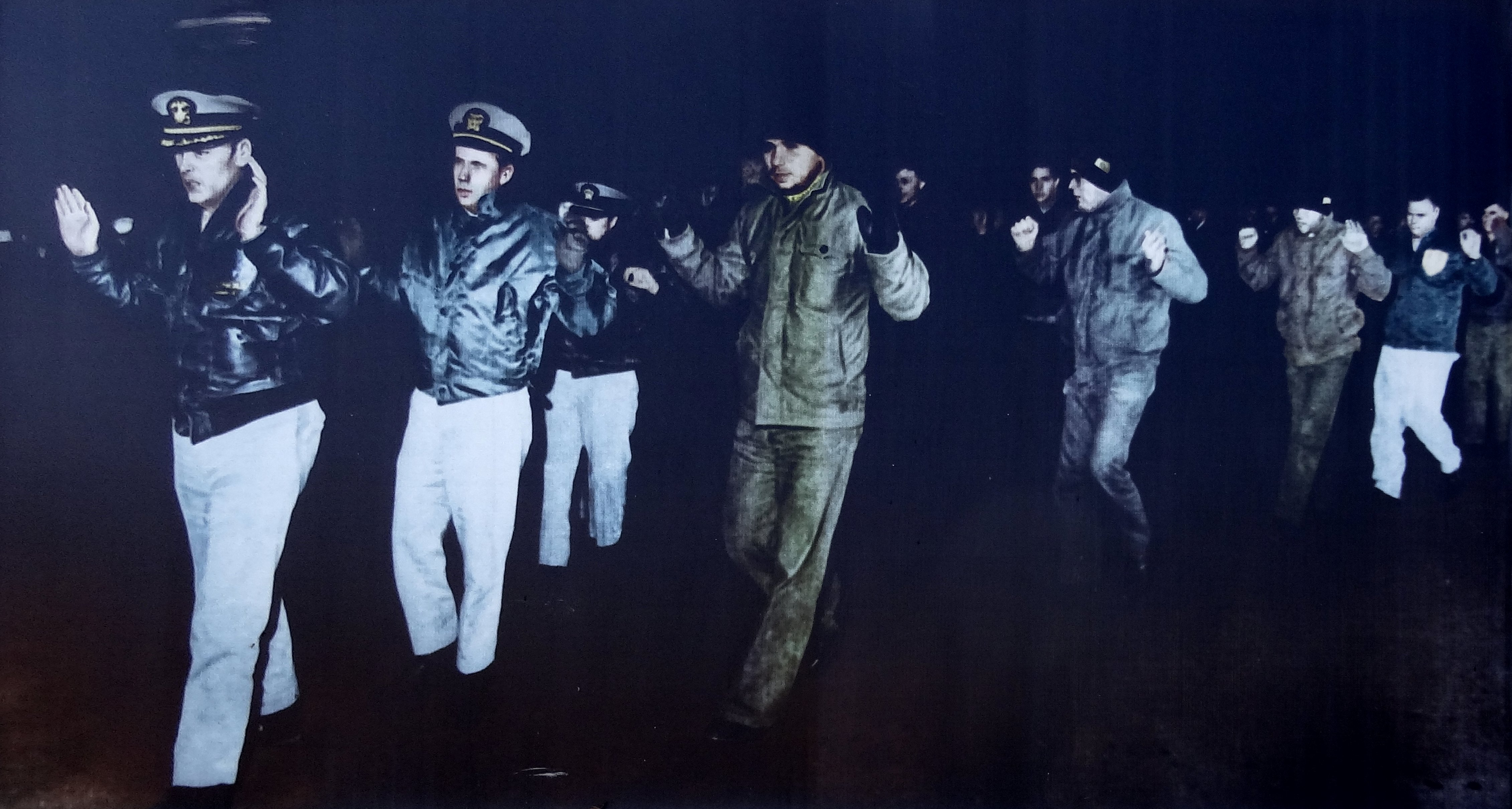
Photo of captured crew, on display in war museum in Pyongyang.

The first official confirmation that the ship was in North Korean hands came five days later, 28 January 1968. Two days earlier, a flight by a CIA A-12 Oxcart aircraft from the Project Black Shield squadron at Kadena, Okinawa, flown by pilot Jack Weeks, made three high-altitude, high-speed flights over North Korea. When the aircraft's films were processed in the United States, they showed Pueblo to be in the Wonsan harbor area surrounded by two North Korean vessels.

There was dissent among government officials in the United States regarding the nation's response to the situation. Congressman Mendel Rivers suggested that President Johnson issue an ultimatum for the return of Pueblo under penalty of nuclear attack, while Senator Gale McGee said that the United States should wait for more information and not make "spasmodic response[s] to aggravating incidents." According to Horace Busby, Special Assistant to President Johnson, the president's "reaction to the hostage taking was to work very hard here to keep down any demands for retaliation or any other attacks upon North Koreans", worried that rhetoric might result in the prisoners being killed.

On Wednesday, 24 January 1968, the day following the incident, after extensive cabinet meetings Washington decided that its initial response should be to:

- Deploy air and naval forces to the immediate area.
- Make reconnaissance flights over the location of the Pueblo.
- Call up military reserves and extend terms of military service.
- Protest the incident within the framework of the United Nations.
- Have President Johnson personally cable Soviet premier Alexei Kosygin.

The Johnson Administration also considered a blockade of North Korean ports, air strikes on military targets and an attack across the Demilitarized Zone separating the two Koreas.

Although American officials assumed that the seizure of Pueblo had been directed by the Soviet Union, declassified Soviet archives later showed that the Soviet leadership was caught by surprise, and became fearful of war on the Korean peninsula. Eastern Bloc ambassadors urged North Korea to exercise caution after the incident. Several documents suggest that North Korea's aggressive action may have been an attempt to signal a tilt towards the Chinese Communist Party in the aftermath of the Sino-Soviet split in 1966.

== Aftermath ==
Pueblo was taken into port at Wonsan and the crew was moved twice to prisoner-of-war (POW) camps. The crew members reported upon release that they were starved and regularly tortured while in North Korean custody. This treatment turned worse when the North Koreans realized that crewmen were secretly giving them "the finger" in staged propaganda photos. The torture included severe beatings and use of stress positions.

North Korean Propaganda Photograph of prisoners of USS Pueblo. Photo and explanation from the Time article that exposed the Hawaiian Good Luck Sign secret. The sailors were flipping the middle finger, as a way to covertly protest their captivity in North Korea, and the propaganda on their treatment and guilt. The North Koreans for months photographed them without knowing the real meaning of flipping the middle finger, while the sailors explained that the sign meant good luck in Hawaii.

Commander Lloyd M. Bucher was psychologically tortured, including being put through a mock firing squad in an effort to make him confess. Eventually the North Koreans threatened to execute his men in front of him, and Bucher relented and agreed to "confess to his and the crew's transgression." Bucher wrote the confession since a "confession" by definition needed to be written by the confessor himself. They verified the meaning of what he wrote, but failed to catch the pun when he said "We paean the DPRK [North Korea]. We paean their great leader Kim Il Sung". (Bucher pronounced "paean" as "pee on.")

Negotiations for the release of the crew took place at Panmunjom. At the same time, U.S. officials were concerned with conciliating the South Koreans, who expressed discontent about being left out of the negotiations. Richard A. Ericson, a political counselor for the American embassy in Seoul and operating officer for the Pueblo negotiations, notes in his oral history:

The South Koreans were absolutely furious and suspicious of what we might do. They anticipated that the North Koreans would try to exploit the situation to the ROK's disadvantage in every way possible, and they were rapidly growing distrustful of us and losing faith in their great ally. Of course, we had this other problem of how to ensure that the ROK would not retaliate for the Blue House Raid and to ease their growing feelings of insecurity. They began to realize that the DMZ was porous and they wanted more equipment and aid. So, we were juggling a number of problems.

He also noted how the meetings at Panmunjom were usually unproductive because of the particular negotiating style of the North Koreans:

As one example, we would go up with a proposal of some sort on the release of the crew and they would be sitting there with a card catalog ... If the answer to the particular proposal we presented wasn't in the cards, they would say something that was totally unresponsive and then go off and come back to the next meeting with an answer that was directed to the question. But there was rarely an immediate answer. That happened all through the negotiations. Their negotiators obviously were never empowered to act or speak on the basis of personal judgment or general instructions. They always had to defer a reply and presumably they went over it up in Pyongyang and passed it around and then decided on it. Sometimes we would get totally nonsensical responses if they didn't have something in the card file that corresponded to the proposal at hand.

Ericson and George Newman, the Deputy Chief of Mission in Seoul, wrote a telegram for the State Department in February 1968, predicting how the negotiations would play out:

What we said in effect was this: If you are going to do this thing at Panmunjom, and if your sole objective is to get the crew back, you will be playing into North Korea's hands and the negotiations will follow a clear and inevitable path. You are going to be asked to sign a document that the North Koreans will have drafted. They will brook no changes. It will set forth their point of view and require you to confess to everything they accuse you of ... If you allow them to, they will take as much time as they feel they need to squeeze every damn thing they can get out of this situation in terms of their propaganda goals, and they will try to exploit this situation to drive a wedge between the U.S. and the ROK. Then when they feel they have accomplished all they can, and when we have agreed to sign their document of confession and apology, they will return the crew. They will not return the ship. This is the way it is going to be because this is the way it has always been.

Following an apology, a written admission by the U.S. that Pueblo had been spying, and an assurance that the U.S. would not spy in the future, the North Korean government decided to release the 82 remaining crew members, although the written apology was preceded by an oral statement that it was done only to secure the release. On 23 December 1968, the crew was taken by buses to the Korean Demilitarized Zone (DMZ) border with South Korea and crossing at the "Bridge of No Return", carrying with them the body of Fireman Duane D. Hodges, who was killed during the capture. Exactly 11 months after being taken prisoner, the captain led the long line of crewmen, followed at the end by the executive officer, Lieutenant Ed Murphy, the last man across the bridge.

Bucher and all of the officers and crew subsequently appeared before a Navy Court of Inquiry. A court-martial was recommended for Bucher and the officer in charge of the research department, Lieutenant Steve Harris, for surrendering without a fight and for failing to destroy classified material, but Secretary of the Navy John Chafee, rejected the recommendation, stating, "They have suffered enough." Commander Bucher was never found guilty of any indiscretions and continued his Navy career until retirement.

In 1970, Bucher published an autobiographical account of the USS Pueblo incident entitled Bucher: My Story. Bucher died in San Diego on 28 January 2004, at the age of 76. James Kell, a former sailor under his command, suggested that the injuries that Bucher suffered during his time in North Korea contributed to his death.

Along with the Battle of Khe Sanh and the Tet Offensive, the Pueblo incident was a key factor in turning U.S. public opinion against the Vietnam War and influencing Lyndon B. Johnson into withdrawing from the 1968 presidential election.

USS Pueblo is still held by North Korea. In October 1999, she was towed from Wonsan on the east coast, around the Korean Peninsula, to the port of Nampo on the west coast. This required moving the vessel through international waters, and was undertaken just before the visit of U.S. presidential envoy James Kelly to Pyongyang. After the stop at the Nampo shipyard, Pueblo was relocated to Pyongyang and moored on the Taedong River near the spot where the General Sherman incident is believed to have taken place. In late 2012, Pueblo was moved again to the Pothonggang Canal in Pyongyang, next to a new addition to the Fatherland Liberation War Museum.

Today, Pueblo remains the second-oldest commissioned ship in the U.S. Navy, behind USS Constitution ("Old Ironsides"). Pueblo is one of only a few American ships to have been captured since the First Barbary War.

=== Breach of U.S. communications security ===
Reverse engineering of communications devices on Pueblo allowed the North Koreans to share knowledge with the Soviet Union that led to the replication of those communications devices. This allowed the two nations access to the US Navy's communication systems until the US Navy revised those systems. The seizure of Pueblo followed soon after US Navy warrant officer John Anthony Walker introduced himself to Soviet authorities, setting up the Walker spy ring. It has been argued (by John Prados in the June 2010 issue of Naval History Magazine) that the seizure of Pueblo was executed specifically to capture the encryption devices aboard. Without them, it was difficult for the Soviets to make full use of Walker's information. Mitchell Lerner and Jong-Dae Shin argue that Soviet-bloc Romanian dossiers demonstrate that the Soviets had no knowledge of the capture of the ship and were taken by surprise when it happened.

After debriefing the released crew, the U.S. prepared a "Cryptographic Damage Assessment" that was declassified in late 2006. The report concluded that, while the crew made a diligent effort to destroy sensitive material, most of them were not familiar with cryptographic equipment and publications, had not received training in their proper destruction, and that their efforts were not sufficient to prevent the North Koreans from recovering most of the sensitive material. The crew itself thought the North Koreans would be able to rebuild much of the equipment.

Cryptographic equipment on board at the time of capture included "one KL-47 for off-line encryption, two KW-7s for on-line encryption, three KWR-37s for receiving the Navy Operational Intelligence Broadcast, and four KG-14s which are used in conjunction with the KW-37 for receiving the Fleet Broadcasts." Additional tactical systems and one-time pads were captured, but they were considered of little significance since most messages sent using them would be of value for only a short time.

The ship's cryptographic personnel were subject to intense interrogation by what they felt were highly knowledgeable electronics experts. When crew members attempted to withhold details, they were later confronted with pages from captured manuals and told to correct their earlier accounts. The report concluded that the information gained from the interrogations saved the North Koreans three to six months of effort, but that they would have eventually understood everything from the captured equipment and accompanying technical manuals alone. The crew members were also asked about many U.S. cryptographic systems that were not on board the Pueblo, but only supplied superficial information.

The Pueblo carried key lists for January, February and March 1968, but immediately after the Pueblo was captured, instructions were sent to other holders of those keys not to use them, so damage was limited. However it was discovered in the debriefing that the Pueblo had onboard superseded key lists for November and December 1967 which should have been destroyed by 15 January, well before the Pueblo arrived on station, according to standing orders. The report considered the capture of the superseded keys for November and December the most damaging cryptographic loss. The capture of these keys likely allowed North Korea and its allies to read more than 117,000 classified messages sent during those months. The North Koreans would also have gained a thorough knowledge of the workings of the captured systems but that would only have been of use if additional key material was compromised in the future. The existence of the Walker spy ring was, of course, not known at the time of the report.

The report noted that "the North Koreans did not display any of the captured cryptographic material to the crew, except for some equipment diagrams, or otherwise publicize the material for propaganda purposes. When contrasted with the international publicity given to the capture of other highly classified Special Intelligence documents, the fact that this material was not displayed or publicized would indicate that they thoroughly understood its significance and the importance of concealing from the United States the details of the information they had acquired."

=== In the communist camp ===
Documents released from National Archives of Romania suggest it was the Chinese rather than the Soviets who actively encouraged the reopening of hostilities in Korea during 1968, promising North Korea vast material support should hostilities in Korea resume. Together with the Blue House raid, the Pueblo incident turned out to be part of an increasing divergence between the Soviet leadership and North Korea. Fostering a resumption of hostilities in Korea, allegedly, was seen in Beijing as a way to mend relations between North Korea and China, and pull North Korea back in the Chinese sphere of influence in the context of the Sino-Soviet split. After the (then secret) diplomatic efforts of the Soviets to have the American crew released fell on deaf ears in Pyongyang, Leonid Brezhnev publicly denounced North Korea's actions at the 8th plenary session of the 23rd Congress of the Communist Party of the Soviet Union. In contrast, the Chinese (state controlled) press published declarations supportive of North Korea's actions in the Pueblo incident.

Furthermore, Soviet archives reveal that the Soviet leadership was particularly displeased that North Korean leader Kim Il-sung had contradicted the assurances he previously gave Moscow that he would avoid a military escalation in Korea. Previously secret documents suggest the Soviets were surprised by the Pueblo incident, first learning of it in the press. The same documents reveal that the North Koreans also kept the Soviets completely in the dark regarding ongoing negotiations with the Americans for the crew's release, which was another bone of contention. The Soviet reluctance at a reopening of hostilities in Korea was partly motivated by the fact that they had a 1961 treaty with North Korea that obliged them to intervene in case the latter got attacked. Brezhnev however had made it clear in 1966 that just as in the case of the similar treaty they had with China, the Soviets were prepared to ignore it rather than go to all-out war with the United States.

Given that Chinese and North Korean archives surrounding the incident remain secret, Kim Il-sung's intentions cannot be known with certainty. The Soviets revealed however that Kim Il-sung sent a letter to Alexei Kosygin on 31 January 1968 demanding further military and economic aid, which was interpreted by the Soviets as the price they would have to pay to restrain Kim Il-sung's bellicosity. Consequently, Kim Il-sung was invited to Moscow, but he refused to go in person owing to "increased defense preparations" he had to attend to, sending instead his defense minister, Kim Chang-bong, who arrived on 26 February 1968. During a long meeting with Brezhnev, the Soviet leader made it clear that they were not willing to go to war with the United States, but agreed to an increase in subsidies for North Korea, which did happen in subsequent years.

Aftermath: capture and repatriation
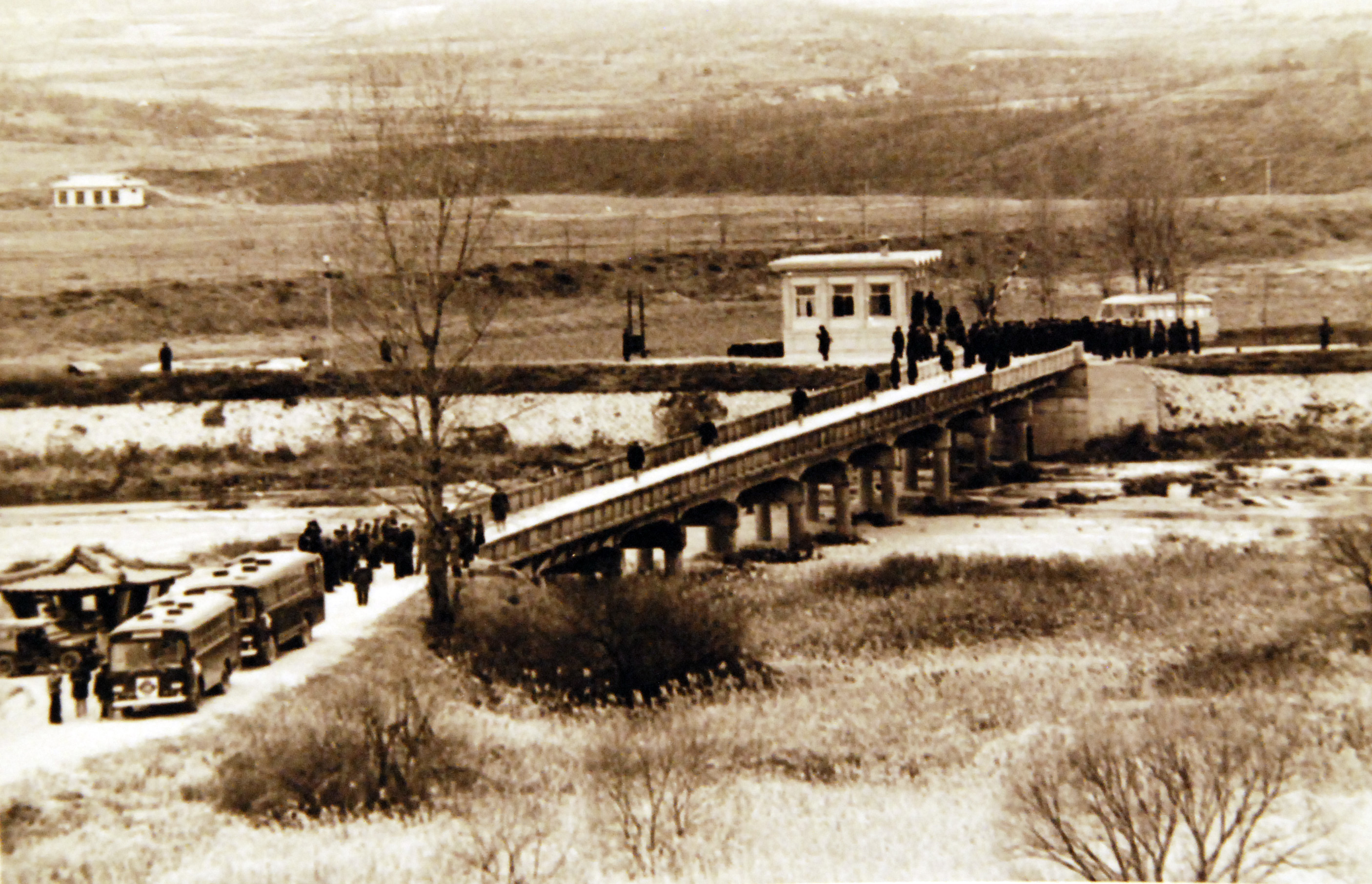
Pueblo's crew being released by the North Koreans across the Bridge of No Return in the Joint Security Area of the DMZ (De-militarized Zone) in Panmunjom, Korea on 23 December 1968.

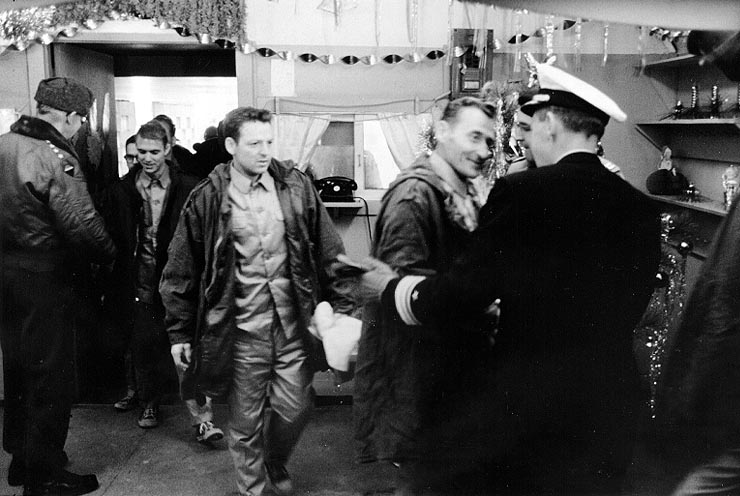
Crew of USS Pueblo
upon release on 23 December 1968.

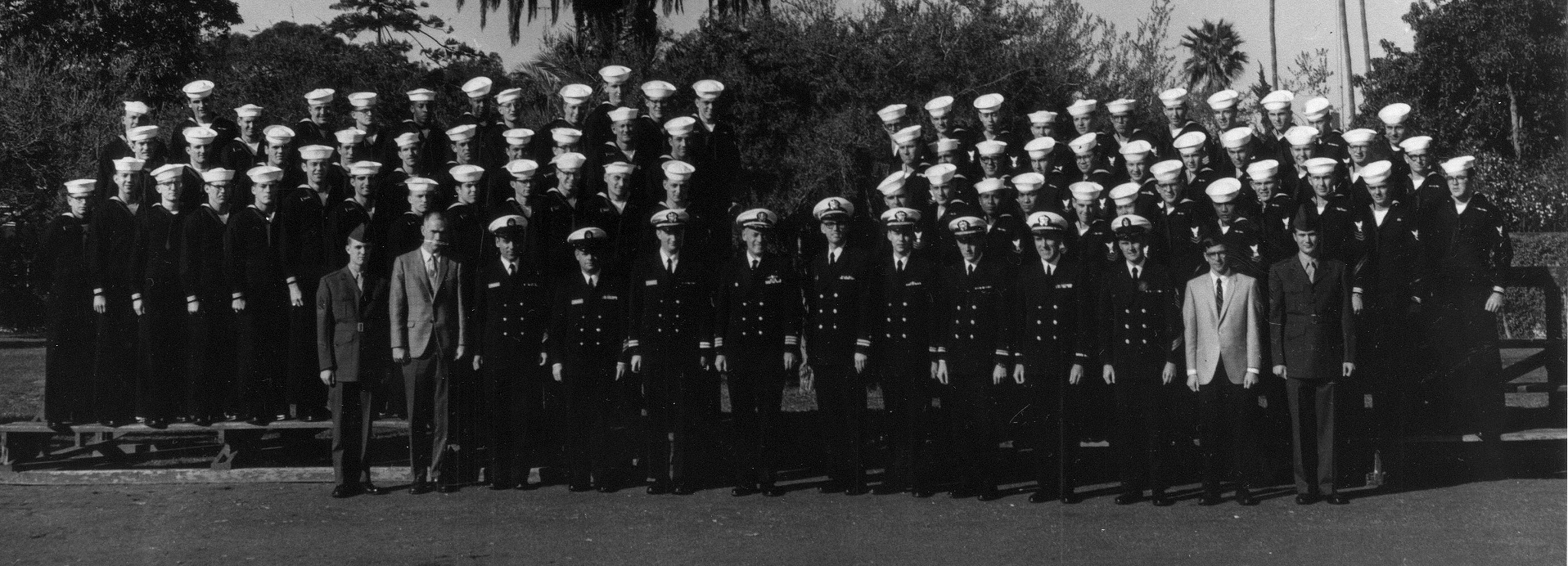
Official Navy photograph of Pueblo's crew taken on the grounds of the Balboa Naval Hospital in San Diego shortly after their arrival.

== Timeline of negotiations ==
Major General Pak Chung-kuk represented North Korea (DPRK) and U.S. Navy Rear Admiral John Victor Smith represented the United States until April 1968, at which point he was replaced by U.S. Army Major General Gilbert H. Woodward. The timeline and quotations are taken from Matter of Accountability by Trevor Armbrister.

Date	Chief Negotiator	Event / Position of respective government
23 January 1968 (around noon local time)		Pueblo is intercepted by North Korean forces close to the North Korean port city of Wonsan.
24 January 1968 (11 am local time)	Admiral Smith	Protests the "heinous" Blue House raid and subsequently plays a tape of a captured North Korean soldier's "confession" ...
24 January 1968 (11 am local time)	Admiral Smith	I want to tell you, Pak, that the evidence against you North Korean Communists is overwhelming ... I now have one more subject to raise which is also of an extremely serious nature. It concerns the criminal boarding and seizure of ... Pueblo in international waters. It is necessary that your regime do the following: one, return the vessel and crew immediately; two, apologize to the Government of the United States for this illegal action. You are advised that the United States reserves the right to ask for compensation under international law.
24 January 1968 (11 am local time)	General Pak	Our saying goes, 'A mad dog barks at the moon', ... At the two hundred and sixtieth meeting of this commission held four days ago, I again registered a strong protest with your side against having infiltrated into our coastal waters a number of armed spy boats ... and demanded you immediately stop such criminal acts ... this most overt act of the U.S. imperialist aggressor forces was designed to aggravate tension in Korea and precipitate another war of aggression ...
24 January 1968 (11 am local time)	General Pak	The United States must admit that Pueblo entered North Korean waters, must apologize for this intrusion, and must assure the Democratic People's Republic of Korea that such intrusions will never happen again. Admit, Apologize and Assure (the "Three As").
4 March 1968		Names of dead and wounded prisoners are provided by the DPRK.
late April 1968		Admiral Smith is replaced by U.S. Army Major General Gilbert H. Woodward as chief negotiator.
8 May 1968		General Pak presents General Woodward with the document by which the United States would admit that Pueblo had entered the DPRK's waters, would apologize for the intrusion and assure the DPRK that such an intrusion would never happen again. It cited the Three A's as the only basis for a settlement and went on to denounce the United States for a whole host of other "crimes".
29 August 1968	General Woodward	A proposal drafted by U.S. Under Secretary of State Nicholas Katzenbach [the "overwrite" strategy] is presented.
29 August 1968	General Woodward	If I acknowledge receipt of the crew on a document satisfactory to you as well as to us, would you then be prepared to release all of the crew?
29 August 1968	General Pak	Well, we have already told you what you must sign ...
17 September 1968	General Pak	If you will sign our document, something might be worked out ...
30 September 1968	General Pak	If you will sign the document, we will at the same time turn over the men.
30 September 1968	General Woodward	We do not feel it is just to sign a paper saying we have done something we haven't done. However, in the interest of reuniting the crew with their families, we might consider an 'acknowledge receipt'
10 October 1968	General Woodward	(demonstrating to General Pak the nature of the 'signing')
10 October 1968	General Woodward	I will write here that I hereby acknowledge receipt of eighty-two men and one corpse ...
10 October 1968	General Pak	You are employing sophistries and petty stratagems to escape responsibility for the crimes which your side committed ...
23 October 1968		The "overwrite" proposal is again set out by General Woodward and General Pak again denounces it as a "petty strategem".
31 October 1968	General Woodward	If I acknowledge receipt of the crew on a document satisfactory to you as well as to us, would you then be prepared to release all of the crew?
31 October 1968	General Pak	The United States must admit that Pueblo had entered North Korean waters, must apologize for this intrusion, and must assure the Democratic People's Republic of Korea that this will never happen again.
17 December 1968	General Woodward	Explains a proposal by State Department Korea chief James Leonard: the "prior refutation" scheme. The United States would agree to sign the document but General Woodward would then verbally denounce it once the prisoners had been released.
17 December 1968	General Pak	[following a 50 min recess]
17 December 1968	General Pak	I note that you will sign my document ... we have reached agreement.
23 December 1968		General Woodward on behalf of the United States signs the Three As document and the DPRK at the same time allows Pueblo's prisoners to return to U.S. custody.

== Tourist attraction ==
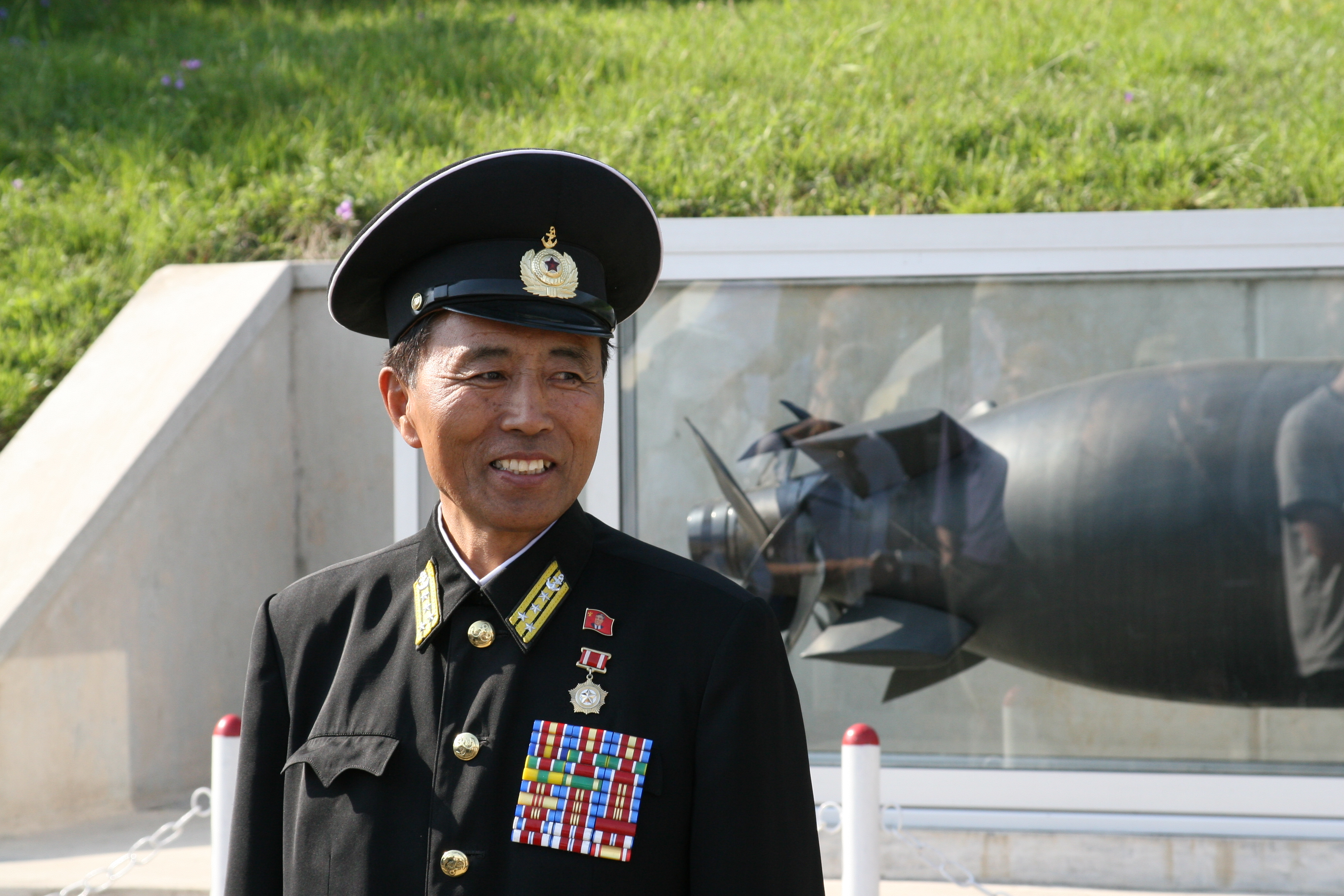
Captain Pak In Ho, who led the 7-man squad of North Korean sailors who stormed the USS Pueblo, often works as a tour guide of the captured ship at the Victorious Fatherland Liberation War Museum.

Pueblo is a tourist attraction in Pyongyang, North Korea, since being moved to the Taedong River. Pueblo used to be anchored at the spot where it is believed the General Sherman incident took place in 1866. In late November 2012 Pueblo was moved from the Taedong river dock to a casement on the Pothong river next to the new Victorious Fatherland Liberation War Museum. The ship was renovated and made open to tourists with an accompanying video of the North Korean perspective in late July 2013. To commemorate the anniversary of the Korean War, the ship had a new layer of paint added. Visitors are allowed to board the ship and see its superstructure, secret code room and crew artifacts. Sailors of the KPN, as well as officers of the KPA, lead tourists through the ship.

The USS Pueblo being visited by tourists in Pyongyang
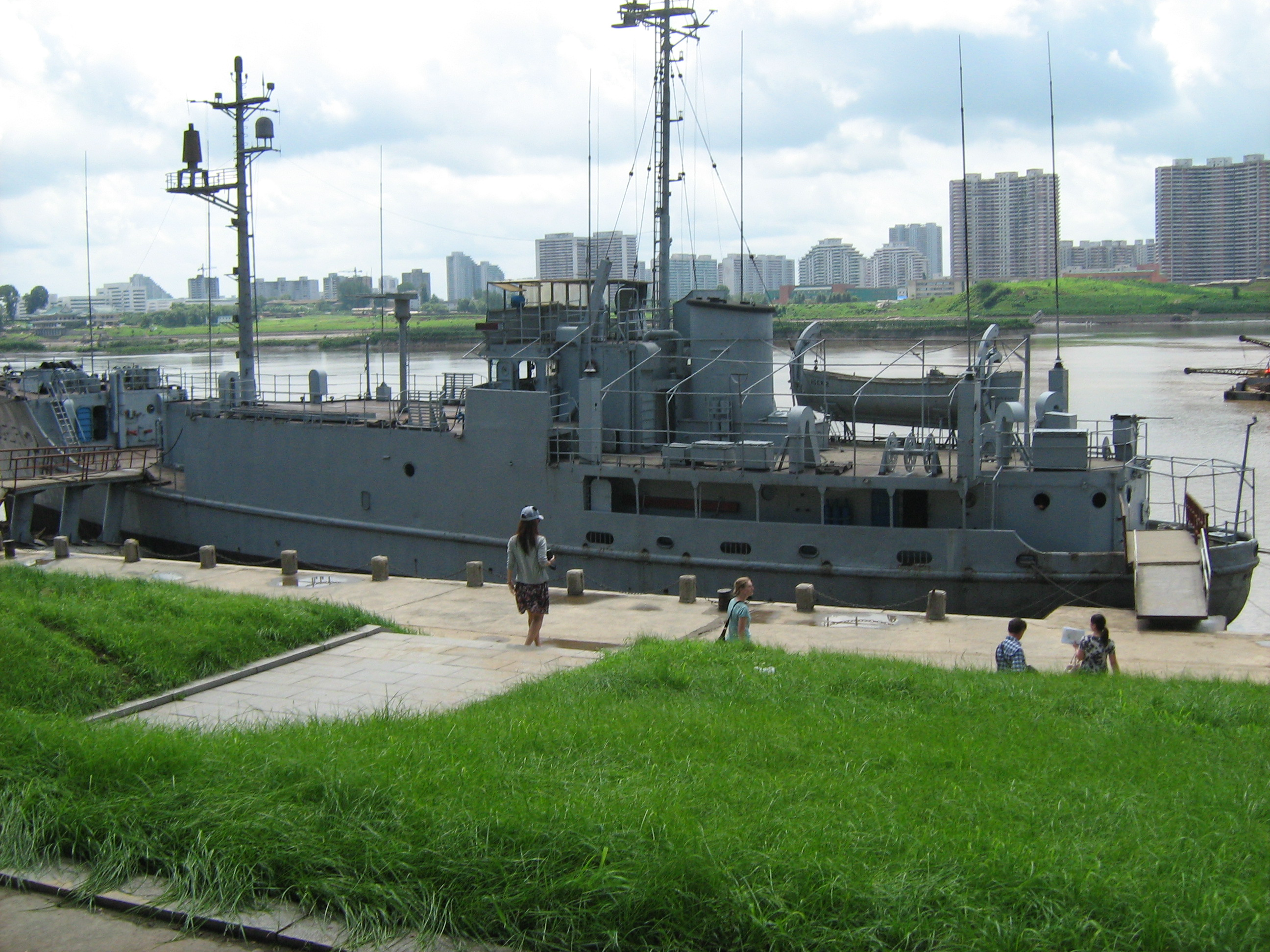

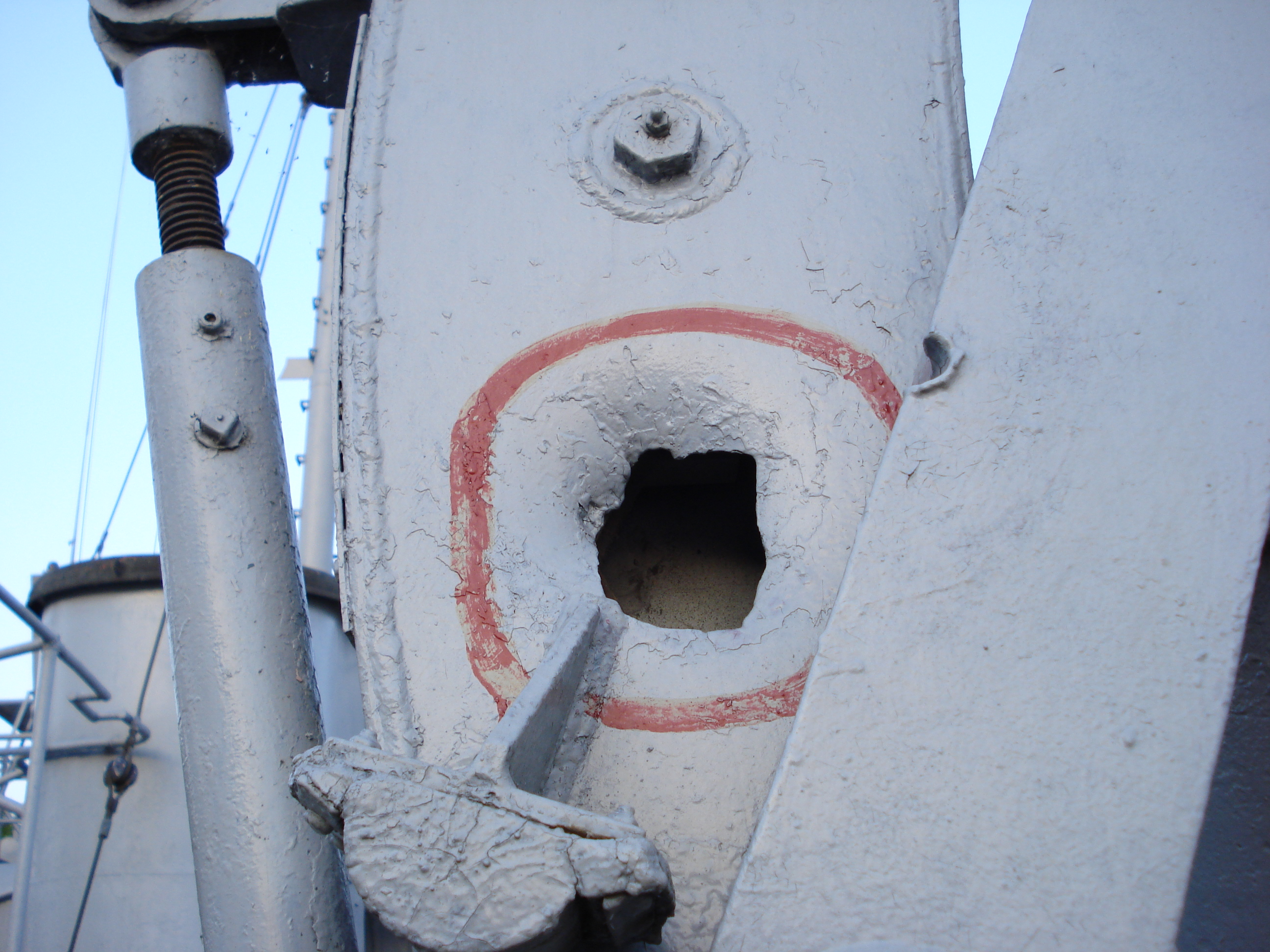

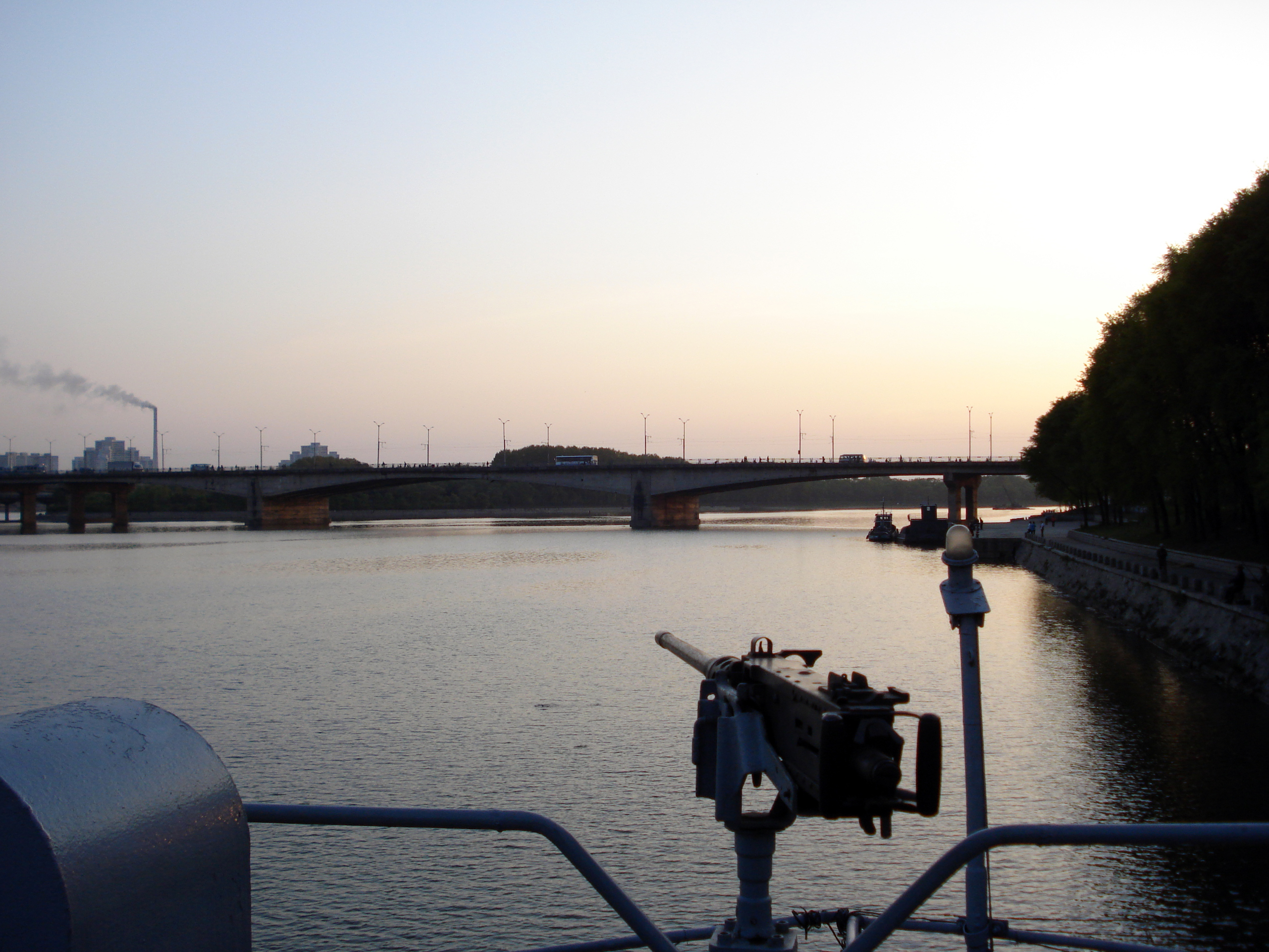

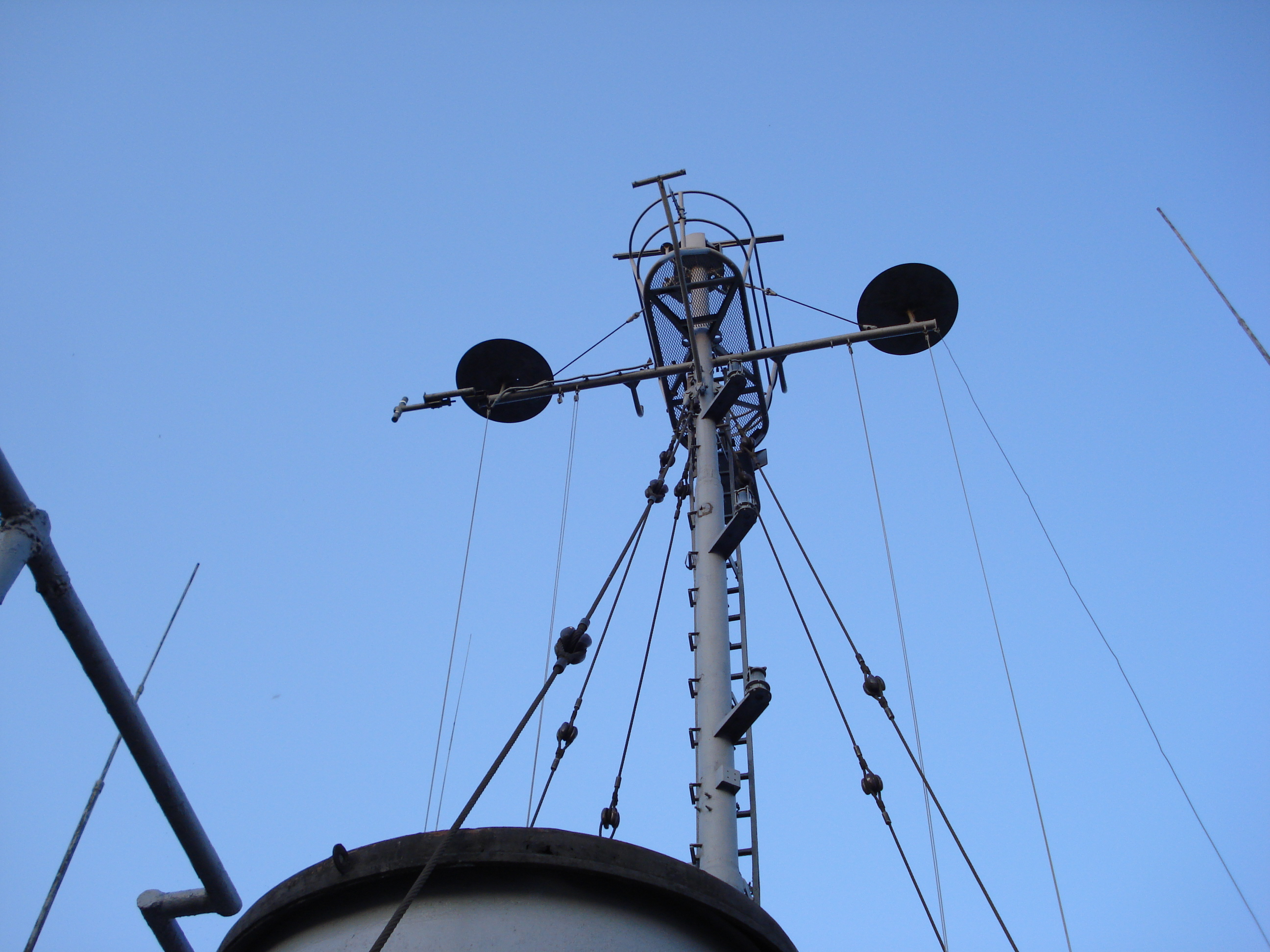

== Offer to repatriate ==
During an August 2005 diplomatic session in North Korea, former U.S. Ambassador to South Korea Donald Gregg received verbal indications from high-ranking North Korean officials that the state would be willing to repatriate Pueblo to United States authorities, on the condition that a prominent U.S. government official, such as the Secretary of State, come to Pyongyang for high level talks. While the U.S. government has publicly stated on several occasions that the return of the still-commissioned Navy vessel is a priority, there has been no indication that the matter was brought up by U.S. Secretary of State Mike Pompeo on his April 2018 visit.

== Lawsuits ==
Former Pueblo crew members William Thomas Massie, Dunnie Richard Tuck, Donald Raymond McClarren, and Lloyd Bucher sued the North Korean government for the abuse they suffered at its hands during their captivity. North Korea did not respond to the suit. In December 2008, U.S. District Judge Henry H. Kennedy, Jr., in Washington, D.C., awarded the plaintiffs $65 million in damages, describing their ill treatment by North Korea as "extensive and shocking." The plaintiffs, as of October 2009, were attempting to collect the judgement from North Korean assets frozen by the U.S. government.

In February 2021, a U.S. court awarded the survivors and their families $2.3 billion. It is uncertain if they will be able to collect the money from North Korea.

== Awards ==
Pueblo has earned the following awards:

As FS-344

American Campaign Medal	World War II Victory Medal	National Defense Service Medal

As USS Pueblo

Combat Action Ribbon	National Defense Service Medal with two service stars

Armed Forces Expeditionary Medal	Global War on Terrorism Service Medal	Korea Defense Service Medal

As for the crew members, they did not receive full recognition for their involvement in the incident until decades later. In 1988, the military announced it would award Prisoner of War medals to those captured in the nation's conflicts. While thousands of American prisoners of war were awarded medals, the crew members of Pueblo did not receive them. Instead, they were classified as "detainees". It was not until Congress passed a law overturning this decision that the medals were awarded; the crew finally received the medals at San Diego in May 1990.

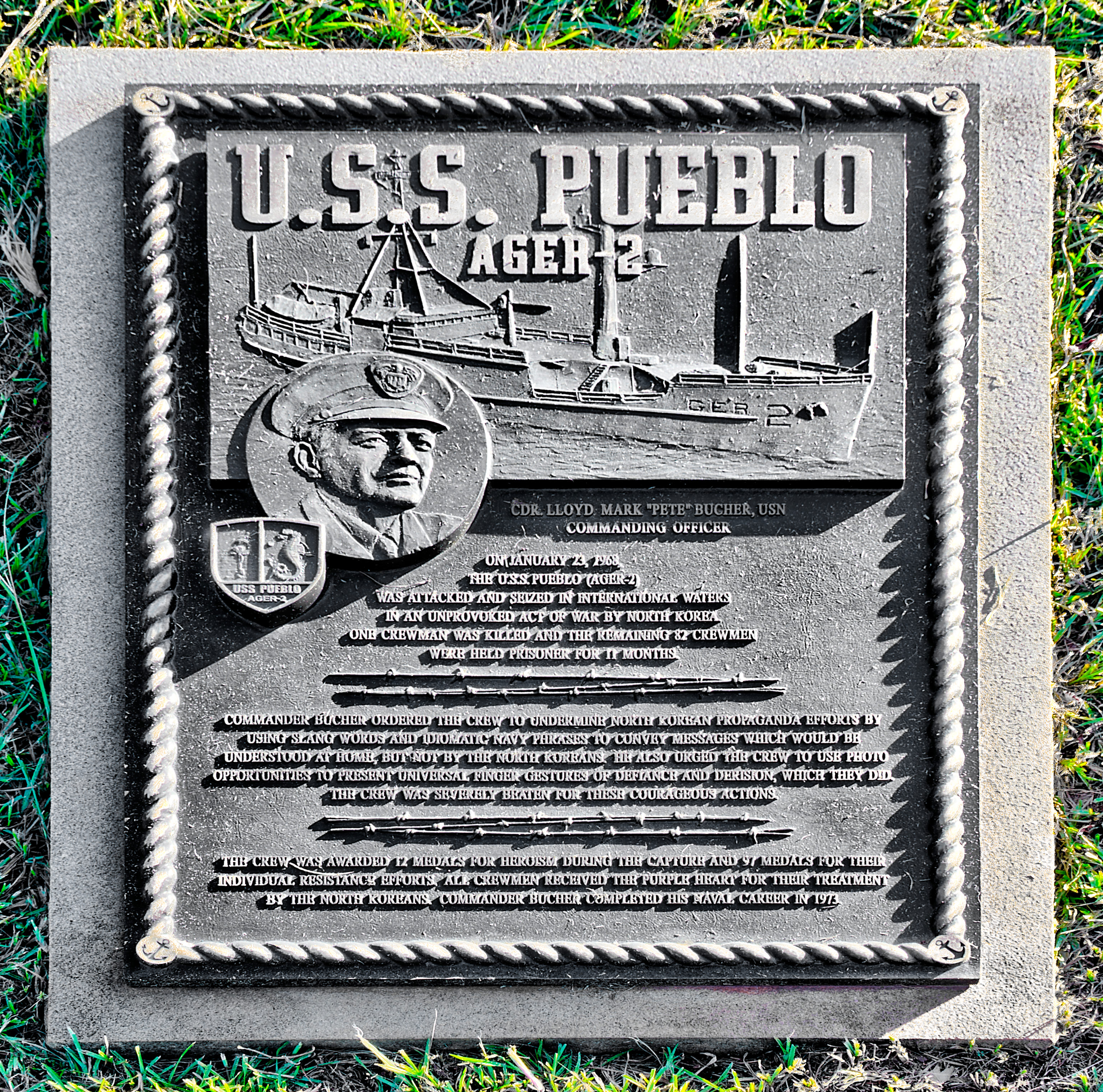
Memorial at Andersonville National Historic Site

== Representation in popular culture ==
The 1968 Star Trek episode "The Enterprise Incident" was very loosely based upon the Pueblo incident. In the episode written by D. C. Fontana, Captain Kirk takes the Federation starship USS Enterprise, apparently without authorization, into enemy Romulan space.

The Pueblo incident was dramatically depicted in the 1973 ABC Theater televised production Pueblo. Hal Holbrook starred as Captain Lloyd Bucher. The two-hour drama was nominated for three Emmy Awards, winning two.

A 2000 North Korean film titled Pueblo based on the incident stars Charles Robert Jenkins. This was his final role in a North Korean film.

== See also ==
- 1969 EC-121 shootdown incident
- Korean DMZ Conflict (1966–1969)
- List of museums in North Korea

Other conflicts:

- Gulf of Tonkin incident
- Hainan Island incident
- Mayaguez incident
- USS Liberty incident

General:

- Technical research ship
- List of hostage crises
