= Pothong River =

River in North Korea

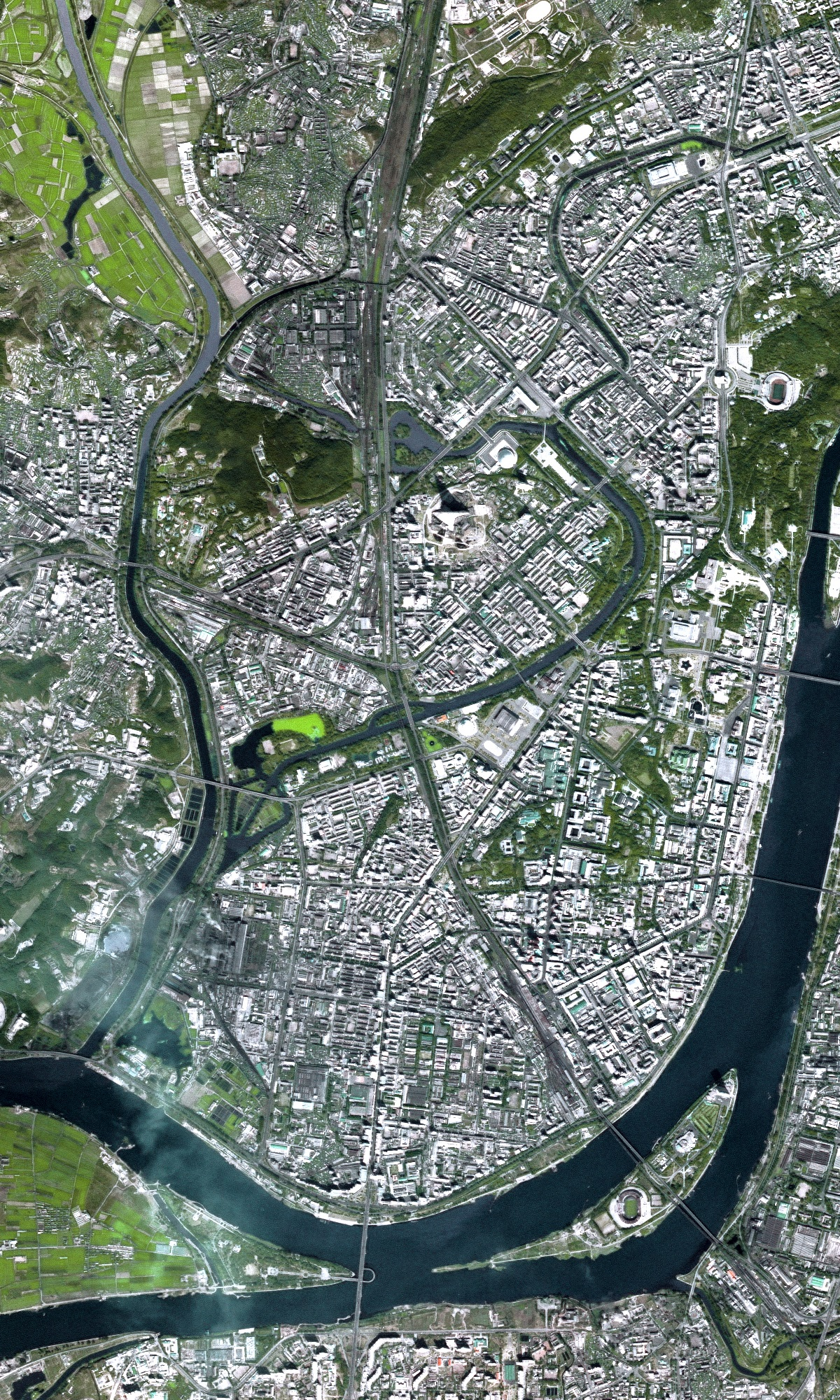

Korean name
- Hangul: 보통강
- Hanja: 普通江
- RR: Botonggang
- MR: Pot'onggang

The Pothong River (Pot'ong River, Potonggang or Potong) is a river in North Korea. It flows through the capital Pyongyang and is a tributary of the Taedong River.

There are several bridges across the river in Pyongyang, including one at its mouth called the "Pothong Bridge"; however, the largest is the one known as "Ansan Bridge", 39°02′02″N 125°42′15″E, which supports the main east–west divided highway.

Prior to 1946, the arable land west of Pyongyang alongside the river (the flood plain), down to where it entered the Taedong River was subject to annual flooding. This area was known as Tosongrang. The farmers there annually rebuilt their homes after the floods subsided, so the construction was, perforce, of a temporary nature, huts and even pit-houses. In 1946 the river was channelized through Tosongrang as the "Pothong River Improvement Project". Tosongrang is now part of Pyongyang.

In 1971, in a park on Mount Bonghwa, a hill on the left (east) bank of the river, the government erected a monument for the "Pothong River Improvement Project", 39°02′38″N 125°42′34″E. It commemorates Kim Il Sung's 1945 visit to Tosongrang and the 1946 channelization.

In 1976 the North Korean postal service (DPRK) issued a stamp commemorating Kim Il Sung's 1945 visit to Tosongrang. In 1998, they issued a stamp souvenir sheet showing Kim Il Sung breaking ground for the construction of the channelization project.
