= SS Empire Duke =

Cargo ship

History
- Name: Empire Duke (1943–46); Lieutenant J Le Meur (1946–49); Zelidja (1949–55); Propontis (1955–66)
- Owner: Ministry of War Transport (1943–46); French Government (1946–49); Compagnie Franco-Cherifienne de Navigation, (1949–55); Compagnia de Navigazione Hellespont SA, (1955–57); Compagnie de Navigazione Propontis Liberia SA (1957–66)
- Operator: H Hogarth & Sons Ltd (1943–46); Compagnie Générale Transatlantique (1946–49); Compagnie Franco Chérifienne de Navigation, (1949–55); Compagnia de Navigazione Hellespont SA, (1955–57); A M Embiricos (1957–66)
- Port of registry: (United Kingdom) Sunderland, UK (1943–46); France (1946–49); Casablanca, Morocco (1949–55); Monrovia, Liberia (1955–66)
- Builder: J L Thompson & Sons Ltd
- Yard number: 628
- Launched: 20 July 1943
- Completed: November 1943
- Maiden voyage: 18 December 1943
- Out of service: 24 May 1966
- Identification: United Kingdom Official Number 180048 (1943–46); Code Letters GCJW (1943–46)
- Fate: Scrapped

General characteristics
- Type: Cargo ship
- Tonnage: 7,240 GRT; 4,179 NRT
- Length: 432 ft 8 in (131.88 m)
- Beam: 57 ft 2 in (17.42 m)
- Draught: 26 ft 11 in (8.20 m)
- Depth: 35 ft 9 in (10.90 m)
- Installed power: 510 nhp
- Propulsion: Triple expansion steam engine
- Speed: 10.5 knots (19.4 km/h)
- Armament: One 4-inch or 4.7-inch gun, six machine guns (Empire Duke)

Empire Duke was a 7,067 GRT cargo ship that was used during the Second World War in investigations into the metallurgical problems that Liberty ships were suffering from.

Empire Duke was built in 1943 by J L Thompson & Sons Ltd, Sunderland, Co Durham for the Ministry of War Transport (MoWT) as an Empire ship.

She was transferred to France in 1945 and renamed Lieutenant J Le Meur. She was sold to Morocco in 1949 and renamed Zelidja. In 1955, she was sold to Liberia and renamed Propontis, not being renamed after a sale in 1957. She served until 1966, when she was scrapped in Taiwan.

== Description ==
The ship was built in 1943 by J L Thompson & Sons Ltd, Sunderland. She was yard number 628.

The ship was 432 feet 8 inches (131.88 m) long, with a beam of 57 feet 2 inches (17.42 m). She had a depth of 35 feet 9 inches (10.90 m) and a draught of 26 feet 11 inches (8.20 m). She was assessed at 7,240 GRT, 4,179 NRT.

The ship was propelled by a 510 nhp triple expansion steam engine, which had cylinders of 24 1/2 inches (62 cm), 39 inches (99 cm) and 70 inches (180 cm) diameter by 48 inches (120 cm) stroke. The engine was built by Duncan Stewart & Co Ltd, Glasgow. It drove a single screw propeller and could propel the ship at 10.5 knots (19.4 km/h).

== History ==
=== World War II ===
Empire Duke was launched on 20 July 1943 and completed in November. The United Kingdom Official Number 180048 and Code Letters GCJW were allocated. Her port of registry was Sunderland and she was placed under the management of H Hogarth & Sons Ltd. Armament consisted of either a 4-in or a 4.7-inch gun, and six machine guns.

Empire Duke departed from Sunderland on 2 December for the Tyne, arriving that day. She departed from the Tyne on 18 December to join Convoy FN 1208, which had departed from Southend, Essex the previous day and arrived at Methil, Fife on 19 December. She then joined Convoy EN 322, which departed on 21 December and arrived at Loch Ewe on 23 December. Empire Duke sailed on to Oban, Argyllshire, arriving the next day. Laden with a cargo of coal, she departed on 26 December to join Convoy OS 63/KMS 37G, which departed from Liverpool, Lancashire on 25 December and split at sea on 7 January 1944. Convoy OS 63 arrived at Freetown, Sierra Leone on 17 January. Empire Duke was in the part of the convoy that formed Convoy KMS 37G, which arrived at Gibraltar on 7 January. She then joined Convoy KMS 37, which departed on 9 January and arrived at Port Said, Egypt on 20 January. Empire Duke left the convoy at Oran, Algeria, where she arrived on 10 January. She departed on 25 January to join Convoy GUS 28, which had departed from Port Said on 15 January and arrived at the Hampton Roads, Virginia, United States on 15 February. She left the convoy at Casablanca, Morocco, She departed on 1 February, joining Convoy SL 147, which had departed from Freetown on 22 January and rendezvoused at sea with Convoy MKS 38 on 2 February. The combined convoys arrived at Liverpool on 13 February. Empire Duke sailed on to Loch Ewe, arriving on 12 February and joining Convoy WN 544, which arrived at Methil on 14 February.

Empire Duke was a member of Convoy EN 350, which departed from Methil on 24 February and arrived at Loch Ewe two days later. She left the convoy at Aberdeen on 25 February. Empire Duke departed on 7 March to join Convoy EN 355, which had departed from Methil the previous day and arrived at Loch Ewe on 8 March. She sailed on to the Clyde, arriving the next day. Empire Duke departed on 16 March to join Convoy ON 228, which had departed from Liverpool the previous day and arrived at New York, United States on 1 April. She left the convoy at Halifax, Nova Scotia, Canada, arriving on 30 March. Laden with a cargo of grain, she departed on 7 April to join Convoy HX 286, which had departed from New York on 5 April and arrived at Liverpool on 20 April. She was bound for Manchester, Lancashire.

Empire Duke's movements are not recorded for over eight weeks. It may have been during this period that she was on loan to the Cambridge University Engineering Department for tests to be undertaken in connection with research into problems affecting various Liberty Ships (see below). She departed from Southend on 12 June as a member of Convoy ETM 7, which arrived at the Seine Bay, France the next day. She spent the next three months shuttling between those two place in various ETM and FTM convoys, arriving at Southend on 12 September as a member of Convoy FTM 2A.

Empire Duke departed from Southend on 30 October as a member of Convoy FN 1526, which arrived at Methil on 1 November. She departed from Methil on 24 November with Convoy FS 1646, arriving at Southend on 26 November. She spent the next four months sailing between Southend and Antwerp, Belgium with various TAM and ATM convoys, arriving at Southend on 28 March 1945 as a member of Convoy ATM 106. Empire Duke was a member of Convoy TBC 117, which departed from Southend on 3 April and arrived at Milford Haven, Pembrokeshire on 6 April. She then sailed to the Clyde, where she arrived two days later. She departed on 22 April to join Convoy ON 298, which had departed from Southend on 21 April and arrived at New York on 7 May. Her destination was Montreal, Quebec, Canada. She arrived at Father Point, Quebec on 6 May.

=== Solving the Liberty ship problem ===
Early Liberty ships suffered problems with brittle fractures, leading to some of them breaking in two without warning. Following the loss of John P. Gaines off the Aleutian Islands, Alaska, United States in 1943, research was carried out by Cambridge University Engineering Department in the United Kingdom into the causes of these losses. Empire Duke was lent for the purpose of testing of the steel used to build ships in the United Kingdom. Constance Tipper proved that low temperatures sustained by Liberty ships in the North Atlantic were leading to brittle fractures. Further research into the plasticity of steel led to the development of specialist steels that are used in artificial human and animal joints. The Victory ship was developed, which was stronger and faster than the Liberty ship.

=== Post-war ===
In June–July 1945 Empire Duke sailed from Montreal to The Downs, off the coast of Kent and then back to Montreal. She then sailed from Montreal on 11 August, arriving in Casablanca on 24 August and then sailed to Avonmouth, Somerset, where she arrived on 8 September. As a member of Convoy TAM 32, she departed Southend on 28 December and arrived at Antwerp the next day.

In May 1946,^{[Note A]} Empire Duke was transferred to the French Government and renamed Lieutenant J Le Meur, after Julien Le Meur, an officer who had served on Île de France, and had been killed in Provence on 28 August 1944, whilst serving as a pilot with the Marine Nationale when his aircraft crashed. She was operated by the Compagnie Générale Transatlantique. Lieutenant J Le Meur loaded a cargo of ammonium nitrate at the Port of Texas City, Texas, United States between 8 and 10 April 1947, a week before the Grandcamp exploded in the Texas City Disaster, which killed 581 and injured 3,500 people.

In 1949, Lieutenant J Le Meur was sold to the Compagnie Franco Chérifienne de Navigation', Casablanca, Morocco and was renamed Zelidja. In 1955, she was sold to Compagnia de Navigazione Hellespont SA, Monrovia, Liberia and was renamed Propontis, after the Sea of Marmara. She was placed under the management of A M Embiricos, Monaco.

In 1957, Propontis was sold to Compagnie de Navigazione Propontis Liberia SA, Monrovia. She was not renamed and remained under the management of Embiricos. Propontis served until 1966, arriving on 24 May at Kaohsiung, Taiwan for scrapping.

== Notes ==
A Sources give the year as 1945. A month of May is given by one source, but Empire Duke was (another states) still in service under that name in December 1945.
