= SS Edvard Grieg =

World War II Liberty ship of the United States

- Edvard Grieg

History
- Name: SS Edvard Grieg
- Namesake: Edvard Grieg
- Builder: Bethlehem-Fairfield Shipyard, Baltimore, Maryland
- Laid down: April 24, 1943
- Launched: May 24, 1943
- Acquired: May 31, 1943
- Renamed: Ultragaz São Paulo in 1951; Mundogaz São Paulo in 1952
- Fate: Scrapped, 1972

General characteristics
- Type: Liberty ship cargo ship
- Displacement: 14,500 long tons (14,733 t) full
- Length: 441 ft 6 in (134.57 m)
- Beam: 56 ft 11 in (17.35 m)
- Draft: 28 ft 4 in (8.64 m)
- Speed: 12.5 knots (23.2 km/h; 14.4 mph)
- Armament: (during war) *1 × 5 in (130 mm) gun; 4 × 40 mm guns

SS Edvard Grieg was a Liberty ship built in the United States during World War II. She was named after Edvard Grieg, a Norwegian composer and pianist. She was laid down as the SS Thomas F. Bayard after Thomas F. Bayard, but she was renamed before being put into service, as she was chartered to Norway. In 1951 she was sold and renamed Ultragaz São Paulo. In 1951 she was converted to a Liquid natural gas Carrier. In 1952 she was sold and renamed Mundogaz São Paulo. In 1972 she was removed from service.

== History ==
The ship was commissioned by the United States War Shipping Administration from the Bethlehem Fairfield Shipyard in Baltimore. The Liberty ship was laid down on April 24, 1943, and launched on May 24 as Thomas F. Bayard. After delivery on May 31, 1943, it went under the management of Nortraship in London as Edvard Grieg in a barebone charter to the Norwegian state. In December 1946 Andreas Stray from Farsund acquired the ship and in February 1950 the Edvard Grieg was transferred to the Oslo company A/S Sobral.

After the end of the Second World War, the need to transport liquid gas increased, which until then had been transported in individual tanks on the deck of general cargo ships. In November 1947, Warren Petroleum Corporation's Natalie O. Warren, one of the world's first LNG carriers, began scheduled service between Houston and New York City, followed shortly thereafter by another LNG carrier converted in the United States. Øivind Lorentzen was one of the pioneers of gas shipping. He initially sold the Edvard Grieg to the Brilliant Transportation Company in Panama, which belonged to the Socony-Vacuum Oil Company. Howaldtswerken in Kiel, Germany converted her into a gas tanker.

After the conversion, the ship was used in trade between Texas and the South American east coast starting in from July 1952. In August 1961, the gas tanker was transferred to A/S Gasskib, which also belonged to Øivind Lorentzen, and was renamed Mundogaz São Paulo. In February 1969, the ship was taken out of service and transferred to the company Mundogas (Storage Inc.), which used her as a gas tank farm in Santos, Brazil. After the machinery was removed in 1971, the ship was struck off the register in 1972.

== Conversion ==
The conversion to a liquid gas tanker was also certified as ship class by the American Bureau of Shipping and DNV. The ship was the oldest type of gas tanker that transported its cargo at ambient temperature. The gases were liquefied at a pressure of around 15 bar. To withstand this pressure, the walls of the cargo tanks were 33 mm thick. They weighed up to 50 tons and gave the ship a high dead weight. The 66 upright cylindrical cargo tanks had a diameter of up to 3.83 meters and were up to 14.65 meters high. As a result, they did not fully use the volume of the ship's hull, which reduced the loading capacity compared to the existing ship's space. The Ultragaz São Paulo had 7248 m^{3} cargo tank volume and could transport 3804 tons of liquid gas.

== Bibliography ==
- "Jones Construction, Panama City FL". www.ShipbuildingHistory.com. October 13, 2010.
- "Liberty Ships – World War II".
- Maritime Administration. "Howard Gray". Ship History Database Vessel Status Card. U.S. Department of Transportation, Maritime Administration. Archived from the original on December 12, 2019.
- Davies, James (May 2004). "Specifications (As-Built)" (PDF). p. 23.
- "SS Howard Gray".
