= SS U.S.O. =

World War II Liberty ship of the United States

History

United States
- Name: U.S.O.
- Namesake: United Service Organizations
- Builder: Bethlehem-Fairfield Shipyard, Baltimore, Maryland
- Laid down: 29 September 1943
- Launched: 21 October 1943
- Completed: 30 October 1943
- Fate: Sold, 1947

General characteristics
- Type: Liberty ship
- Tonnage: 7,000 long tons deadweight (DWT)
- Length: 441 ft 6 in (134.57 m)
- Beam: 56 ft 11 in (17.35 m)
- Draft: 27 ft 9 in (8.46 m)
- Propulsion: 2 × oil-fired boilers; Triple expansion steam engine; 2,500 hp (1.9 MW), single screw
- Speed: 11.5 knots (21.3 km/h; 13.2 mph)
- Capacity: 9,140 tons cargo
- Complement: 41
- Armament: 1 × stern-mounted 4 in (100 mm) deck gun; Variety of anti-aircraft guns

SS U.S.O was a Liberty ship of the United States during World War II, named after the United Service Organizations, an organization designed to provide morale to servicemen deployed all around the world.

Built at the Bethlehem-Fairfield Shipyard in Baltimore, Maryland under MC contract (hull number 1811), the ship was laid down on 29 September 1943, and launched on 21 October 1943. The ship survived the war and was sold into private ownership in 1947. However, in 1967, the ship was wrecked and subsequently scrapped.
