= Liberty ship =

US cargo ship class of WWII

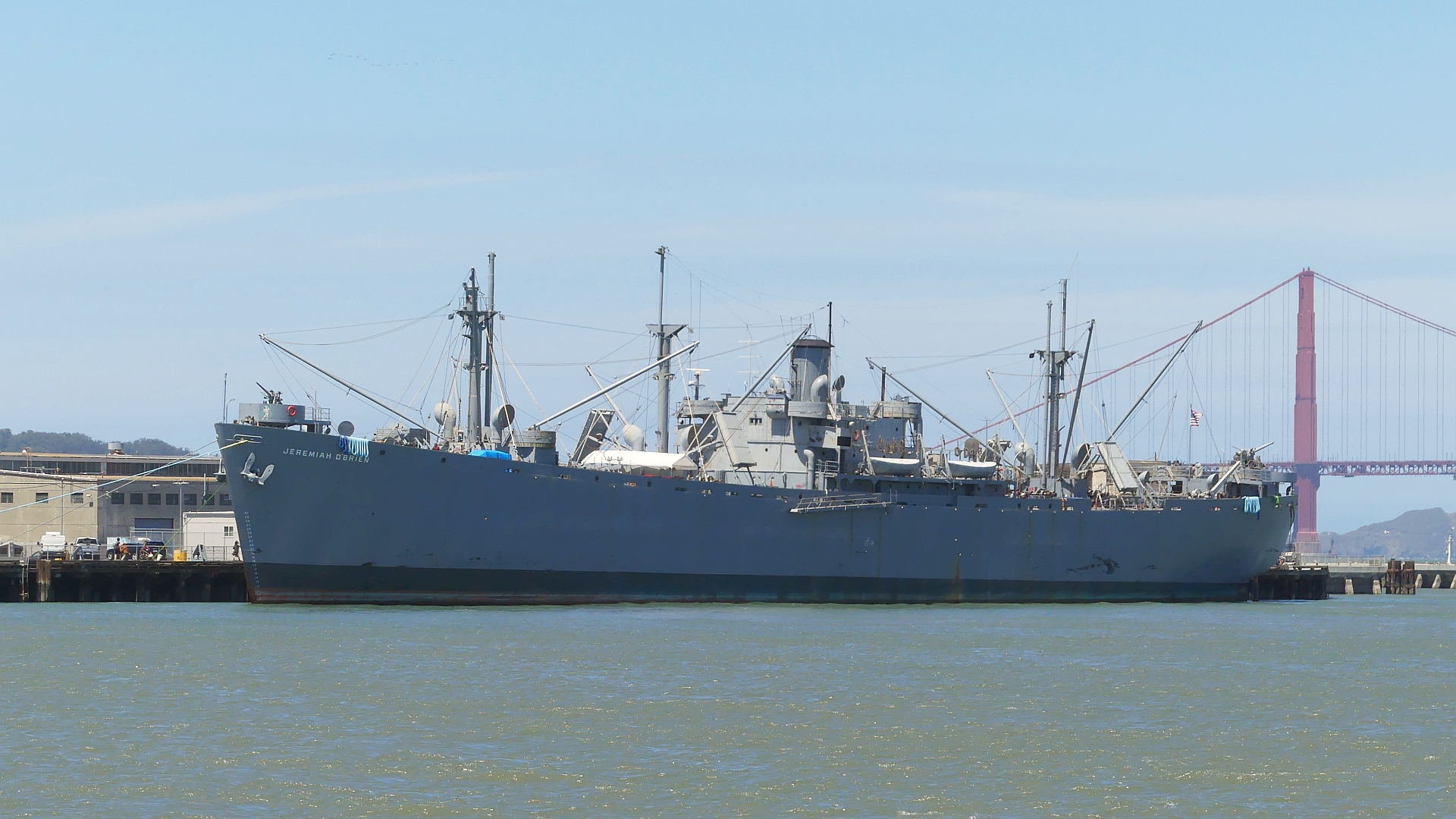
- SS Jeremiah O'Brien, one of the four surviving Liberty ships, photographed in 2022

Class overview
- Name: Liberty ship
- Builders: 18 shipyards in the United States
- Operators: U.S. Maritime Commission & War Shipping Administration, United States Navy (attack cargo ships only)
- Succeeded by: Victory ship
- Cost: US$2 million ($46 million in 2025) per ship
- Planned: 2,751
- Completed: 2,710
- Active: 2 (Traveling museum ships)
- Preserved: 4

General characteristics
- Class & type: Cargo ship
- Tonnage: 7,176 GRT, 10,865 DWT
- Displacement: 14,245 long tons (14,474 t)
- Length: 441 ft 6 in (134.57 m)
- Beam: 56 ft 10.75 in (17.3 m)
- Draft: 27 ft 9.25 in (8.5 m)
- Propulsion: Two oil-fired boilers; triple-expansion steam engine; single screw, 2,500 hp (1,900 kW)
- Speed: 11–11.5 knots (20.4–21.3 km/h; 12.7–13.2 mph)
- Range: 20,000 nmi (37,000 km; 23,000 mi)
- Complement: 38–62 USMM; 21–40 USNAG
- Armament: Stern-mounted 4-in (102 mm) deck gun for use against surfaced submarines, variety of anti-aircraft guns

Liberty ships are a class of cargo ship built in the United States during World War II under the Emergency Shipbuilding Program. Although British in concept, the design was adopted by the United States for its simple, low-cost construction. Mass-produced on an unprecedented scale, the Liberty ship came to symbolize U.S. wartime industrial output.

The class was developed to meet British orders for transports to replace ships that had been lost. Eighteen American shipyards built 2,710 Liberty ships between 1941 and 1945 (an average of three ships every two days), easily the largest number of ships ever produced to a single design.

The Liberty ship was effectively superseded by the Victory ship, a somewhat larger, materially faster, more modern-powered vessel of generally similar design. A total of 531 Victory ships were built between 1944 and 1946.

Liberty ship production mirrored (albeit on a much larger scale) the manufacture of "Hog Islander" and similar standardized ship types during World War I. The immensity of the effort, the number of ships built, the role of female workers in their construction, and the survival of some far longer than their original five-year design life combine to make them the subject of much continued interest.

== History ==
=== Design ===
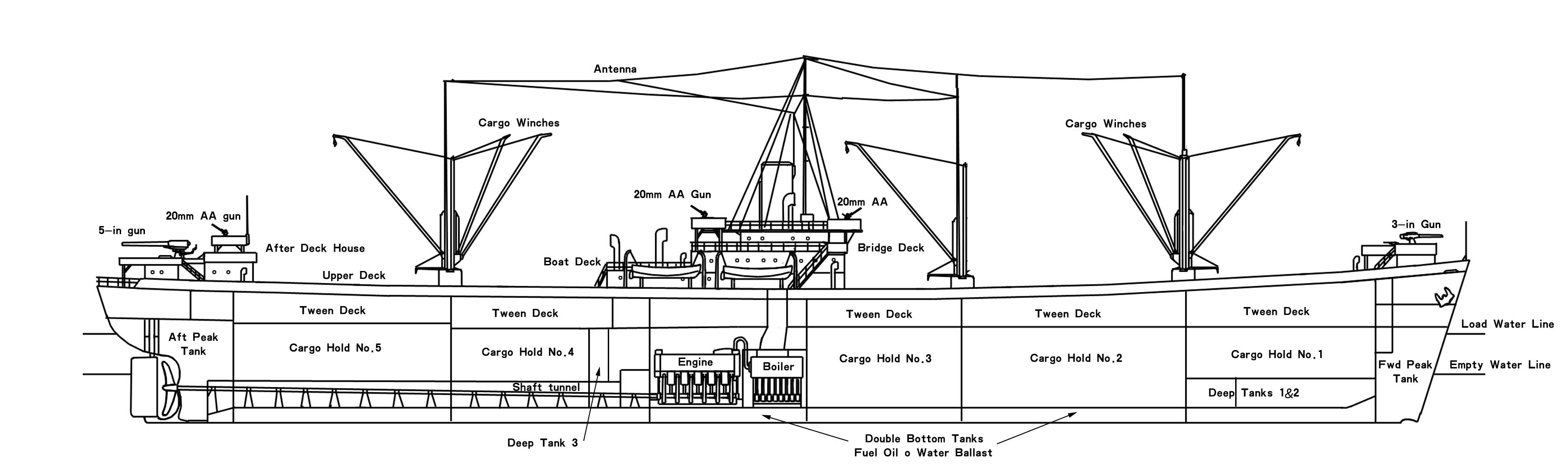
Profile plan of a Liberty ship

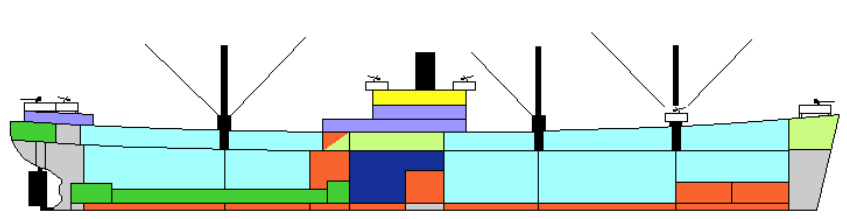
A colored diagram of compartments on a Liberty ship, from the right side, front to the right Machinery spaces Command and control Liquid stores Dry cargo Engine room Misc Dry stores Habitation

In 1936, the American Merchant Marine Act was passed to subsidize the annual construction of 50 commercial merchant vessels which could be used in wartime by the United States Navy as naval auxiliaries, crewed by U.S. Merchant Mariners. The number was doubled in 1939 and again in 1940 to 200 ships a year. Ship types included two tankers and three types of merchant vessel, all to be powered by steam turbines. Limited industrial capacity, especially for reduction gears, meant that relatively few of these designs of ships were built.

However, in 1940, the British government ordered 60 Ocean-class freighters from American yards to replace war losses and boost the merchant fleet. These were simple but fairly large (for the time) with a single 2,500 horsepower (1,900 kW) compound steam engine of outdated but reliable design. Britain specified coal-fired plants, because it then had extensive coal mines and no significant domestic oil production. (Note: During WW II, Nazi Germany made the exact same decision, when they decided to mass-produce coal-powered, steam-engine driven Kriegslokomotives. Despite electrical industrial technology having begun to replace stationary steam engines in the late 19th century, and Internal combustion engines in two-railcar, high speed Diesel-electric locomotive and train sets, developed by Maybach, were series produced in Germany since 1935, the war also made Germany short on oil, but still rich in coal, especially in the Ruhr region, and thus mass-produced old-fashioned but very effective steam locomotives for transporting goods and people across the large conquered European area.)

The predecessor designs, which included the "Northeast Coast, Open Shelter Deck Steamer", were based on a simple ship originally produced in Sunderland by J.L. Thompson & Sons based on a 1939 design for a simple tramp steamer, which was cheap to build and cheap to run (see Silver Line). Examples include SS Dorington Court built in 1939. The order specified an 18-inch (0.46 m) increase in draft to boost displacement by 800 long tons (810 t) to 10,100 long tons (10,300 t). The accommodation, bridge, and main engine were located amidships, with a tunnel connecting the main engine shaft to the propeller via a long aft extension. The first Ocean-class ship, SS Ocean Vanguard, was launched on 16 August 1941.

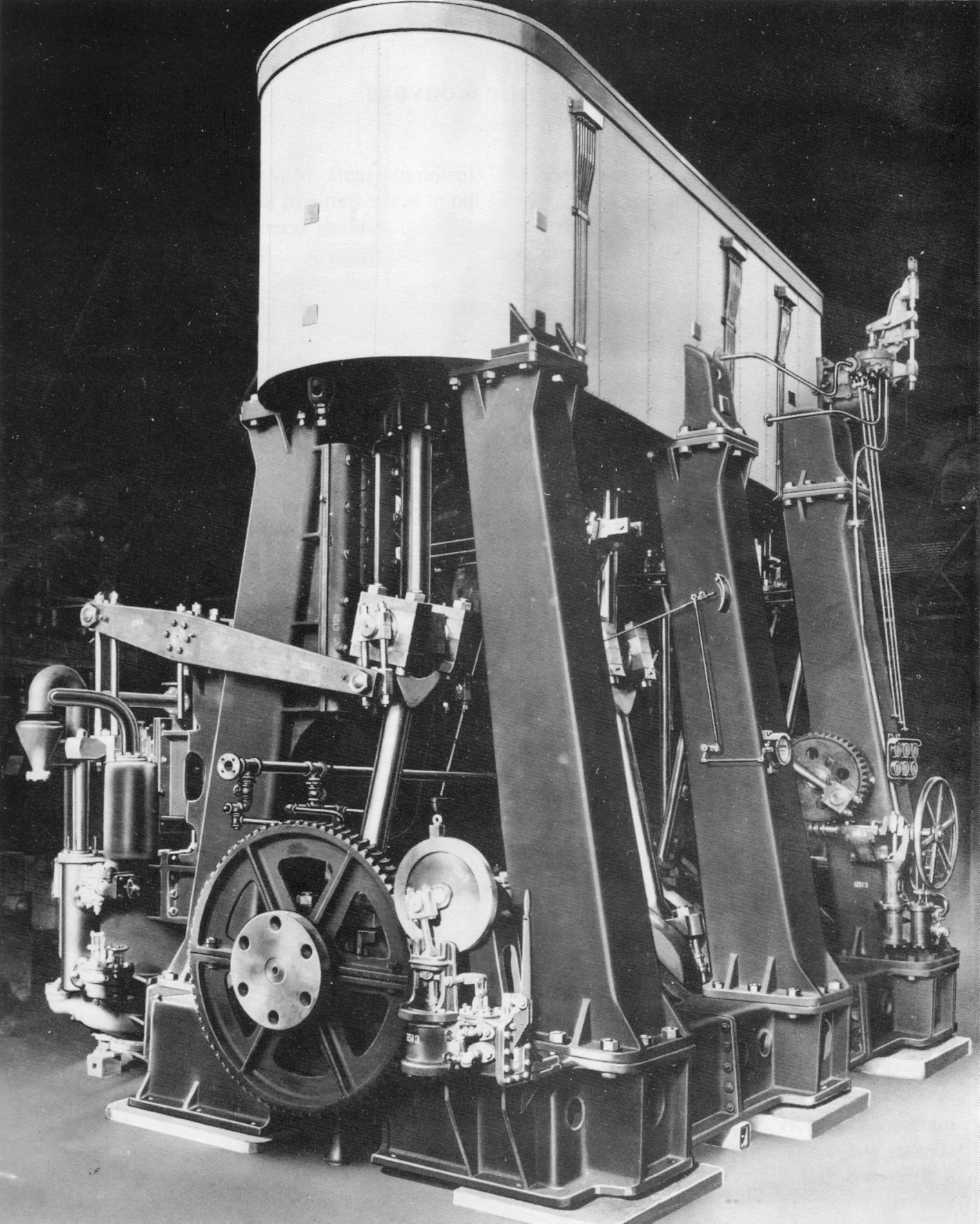
140-ton vertical triple expansion steam engine of the type used to power World War II Liberty ships, assembled for testing before delivery

The design was modified by the United States Maritime Commission, in part to increase conformity to American construction practices, but more importantly to make it even quicker and cheaper to build. The US version was designated 'EC2-S-C1': 'EC' for Emergency Cargo, '2' for a ship between 400 and 450 feet (120 and 140 m) long (Load Waterline Length), 'S' for steam engines, and 'C1' for design C1. The new design replaced much riveting (which accounted for one-third of previous designs labor costs) with welding, and had oil-fired boilers. It was adopted as a Merchant Marine Act design, and production awarded to a conglomerate of West Coast engineering and construction companies headed by Henry J. Kaiser known as the Six Companies. Liberty ships were designed to carry 10,000 long tons (10,200 t) of cargo, usually one type per ship, but, during wartime, generally carried loads far exceeding this.

On 27 March 1941, the number of lend-lease ships was increased to 200 by the Defense Aid Supplemental Appropriations Act and increased again in April to 306, of which 117 would be Liberty ships.

=== Variants ===
The basic EC2-S-C1 cargo design was modified during construction into three major variants with the same basic dimensions and slight variance in tonnage. One variant, with basically the same features but different type numbers, had four rather than five holds served by large hatches and kingpost with large capacity booms. Those four hold ships were designated for transport of tanks and boxed aircraft.

In the detailed Federal Register publication of the post war prices of Maritime Commission types the Liberty variants are noted as:

EC2-S-AW1
Collier (All given names of coal seams as SS Banner Seam, Beckley Seam and Bon Air Seam)
Z-EC2-S-C2
Tank carrier (four holds, kingposts) – example SS Frederic C. Howe (Note: The Z-EC2-S-C2 Tank carrier type details had not been previously published until 17 August 1946 Federal Register.)
Z-ET1-S-C3
T1 tanker – example SS Carl R. Gray. Eighteen were commissioned into USN in 1943 as the Armadillo-class tanker
Z-EC2-S-C5
Boxed aircraft transport (four holds, kingposts) – example SS Charles A. Draper. (Note: photo showing holds, kingposts) Post war 16 of these Liberty ships were converted 1954–1958 into Guardian-class radar picket ship

In preparation for the Normandy landings and afterward to support the rapid expansion of logistical transport ashore a modification was made to make standard Liberty vessels more suitable for mass transport of vehicles and in records are seen as "MT" for Motor Transport vessels. As MTs four holds were loaded with vehicles while the fifth was modified to house the drivers and assistants.

The modifications into troop transports also were not given special type designations.

=== Propulsion ===
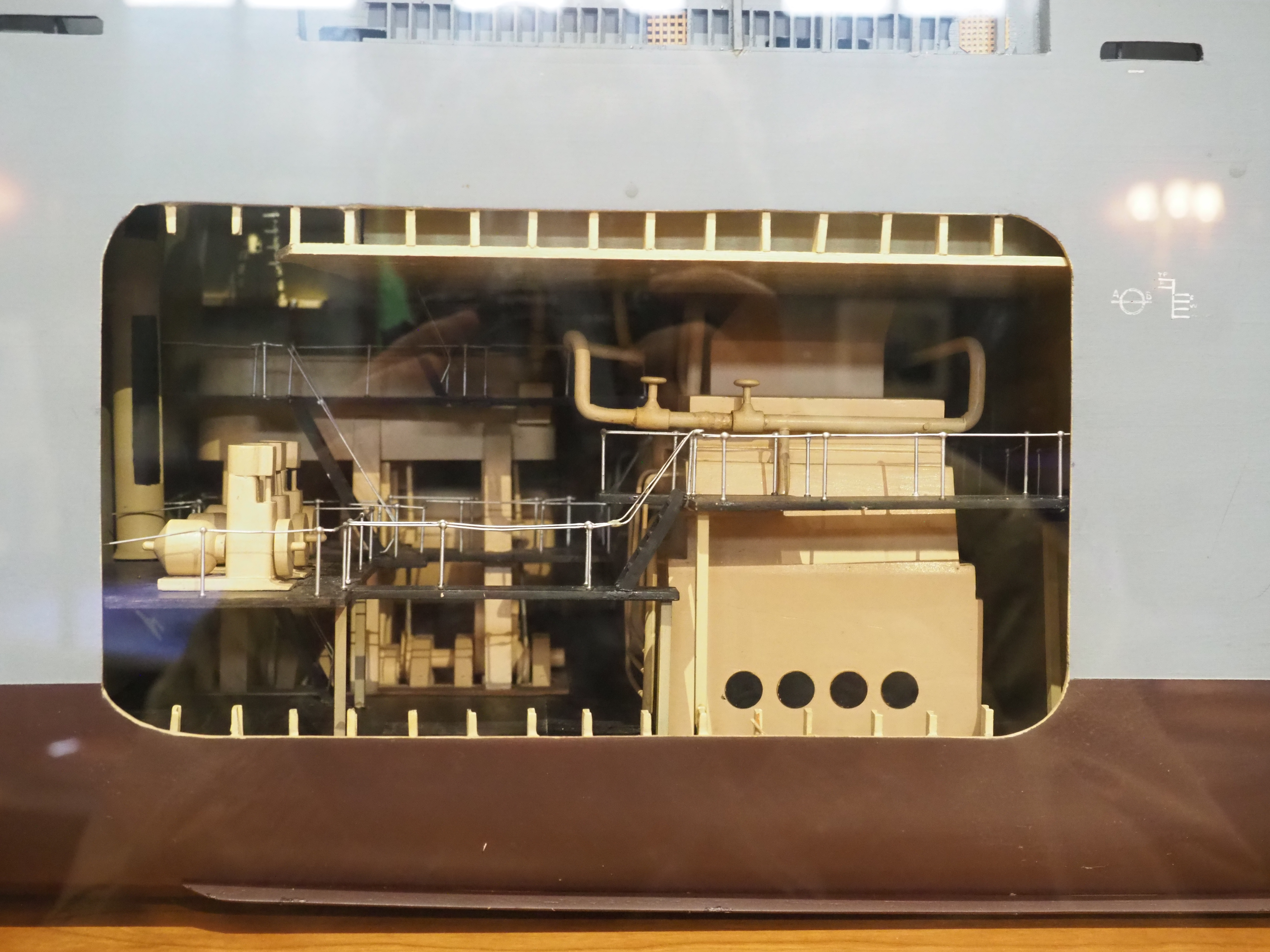
Engine room (model cutaway)

By 1941, the steam turbine was the preferred marine steam engine because of its greater efficiency compared to earlier reciprocating compound steam engines. Steam turbine engines however, required very precise manufacturing techniques to machine their complicated double helical reduction gears, and the companies capable of producing them were already committed to the large construction program for warships. Therefore, a 140-short-ton (130 t) vertical triple expansion steam engine, of obsolete design, was selected to power Liberty ships because it was cheaper and easier to build in the numbers required for the Liberty ship program, and because more companies could manufacture it. Eighteen different companies eventually built the engine. It had the additional advantage of ruggedness, simplicity and familiarity to seamen. Parts manufactured by one company were interchangeable with those made by another, and the openness of its design made most of its moving parts easy to see, access, and oil. The engine—21 feet (6.4 m) long and 19 feet (5.8 m) tall—was designed to operate at 76 rpm and propel a Liberty ship at about 11 knots (20 km/h; 13 mph).

=== Construction ===
The ships were constructed of sections that were welded together. This is similar to the technique used by Palmer's at Jarrow, northeast England, but substituted welding for riveting. Riveted ships took several months to construct. The work force was newly trained as the yards responsible had not previously built welded ships. As America entered the war, the shipbuilding yards employed women, to replace men who were enlisting in the armed forces.

The construction of a Liberty ship at the Bethlehem-Fairfield Shipyards, Baltimore, Maryland, in March/April 1943

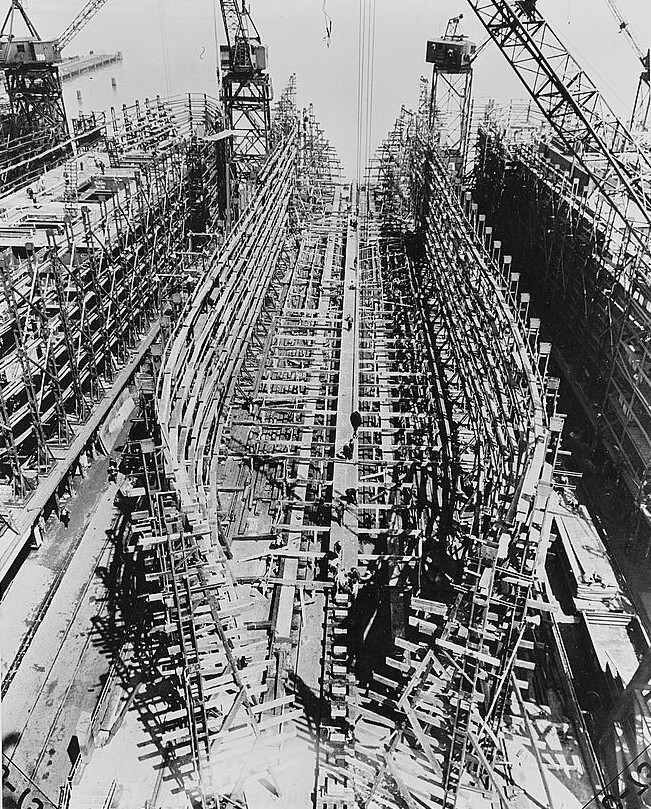
Day 2 : Laying of the keel plates

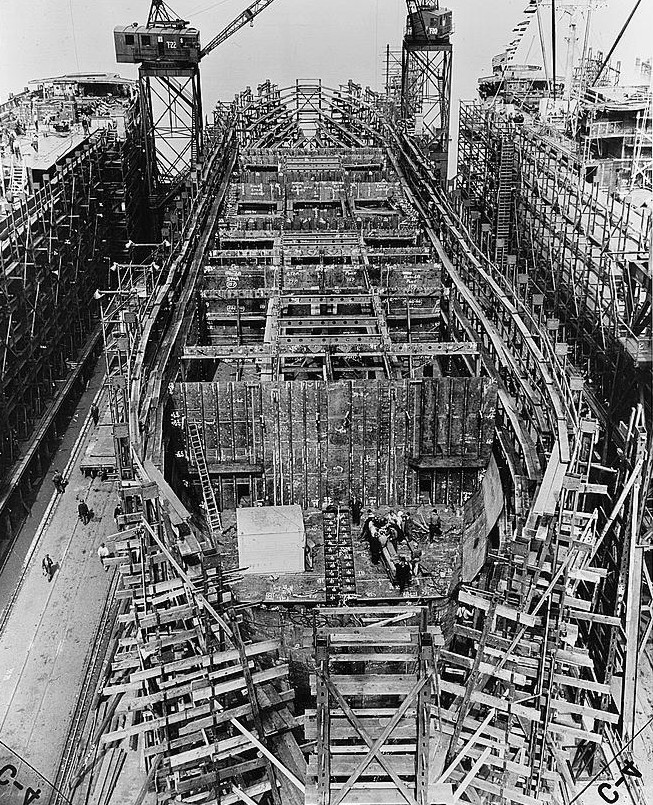
Day 6 : Bulkheads and girders below the second deck are in place.

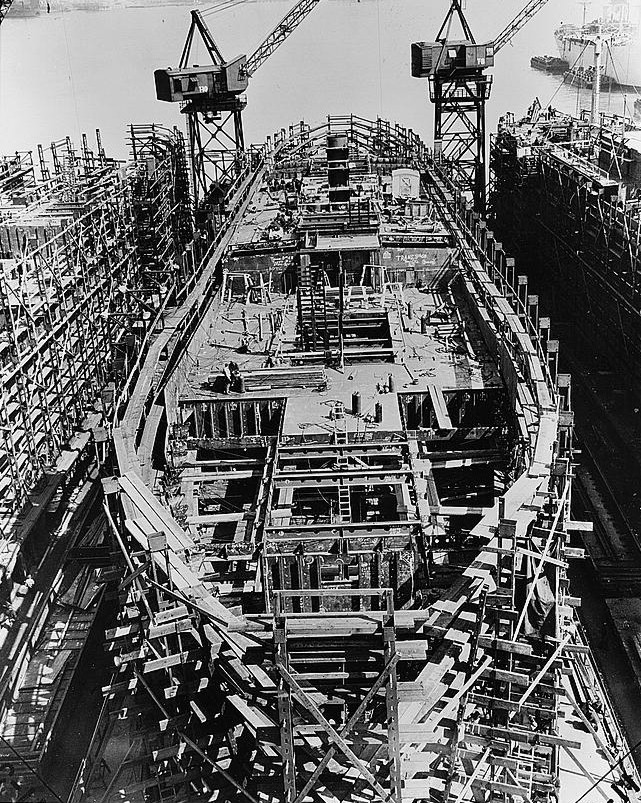
Day 10 : Lower deck being completed and the upper deck amidship erected

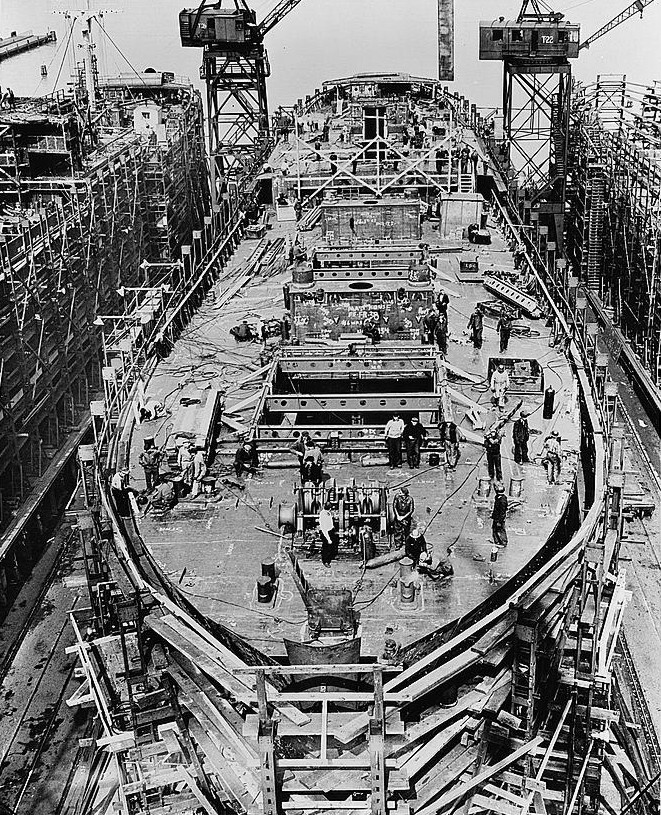
Day 14 : Upper deck erected and mast houses and the after-deck house in place

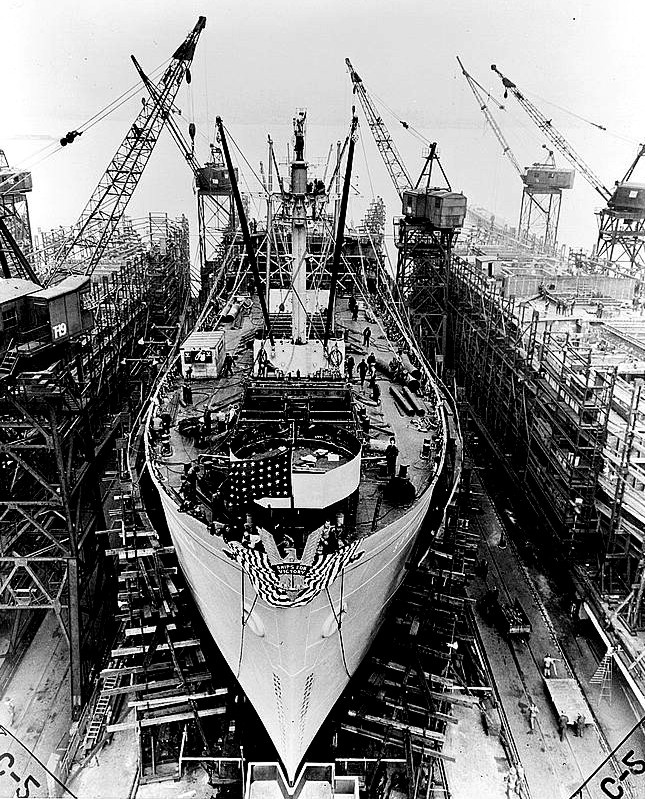
Day 24 : Ship ready for launching

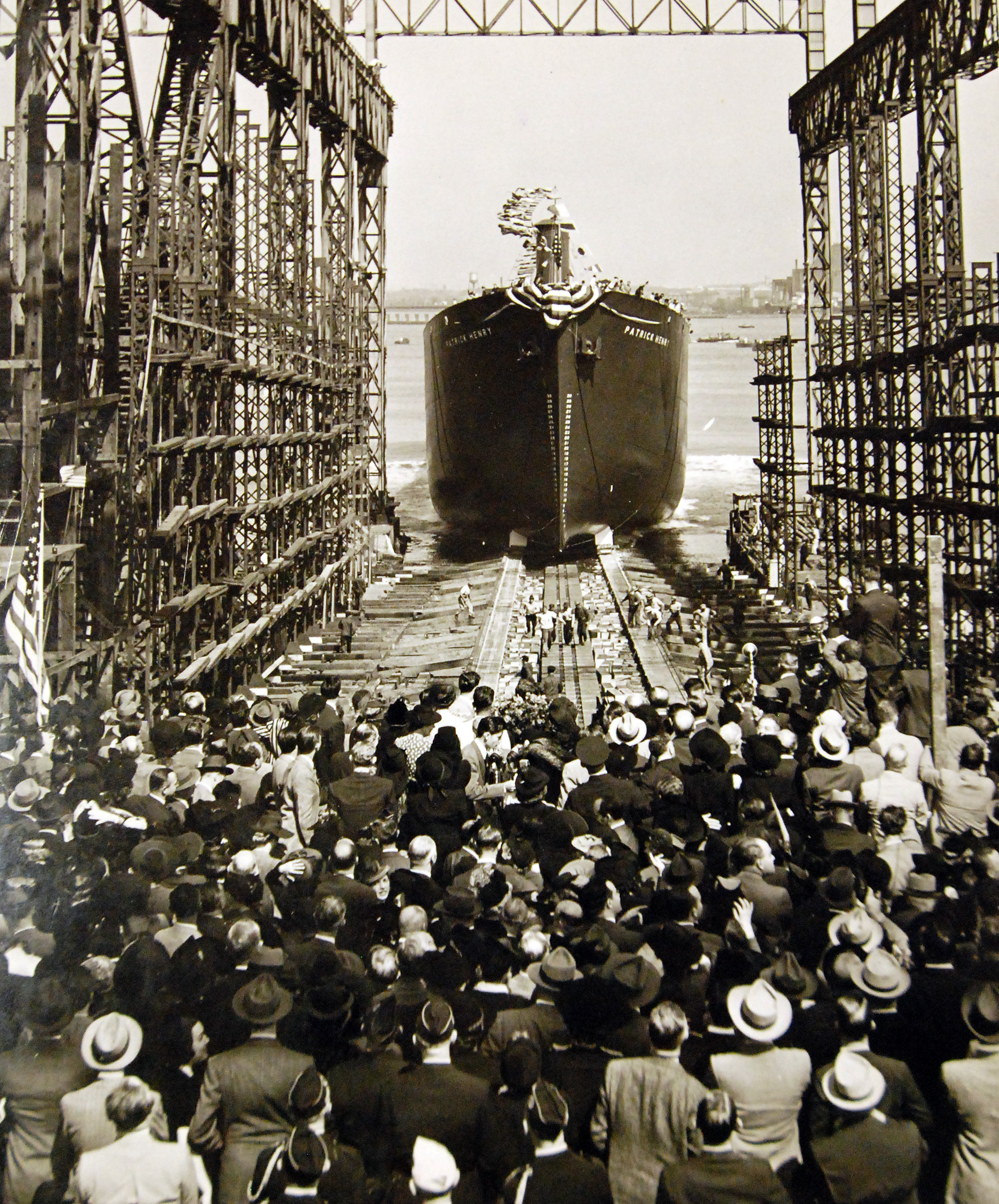
Launch of SS Patrick Henry, the first Liberty ship, on 27 September 1941

The ships initially had a poor public image owing to their appearance. In a speech announcing the emergency shipbuilding program President Franklin D. Roosevelt had referred to the ship as "a dreadful looking object", and Time called it an "Ugly Duckling". 27 September 1941 was dubbed Liberty Fleet Day to try to assuage public opinion, since the first 14 "Emergency" vessels were launched that day. The first of these was SS Patrick Henry, launched by President Roosevelt. In remarks at the launch ceremony FDR cited Patrick Henry's 1775 speech that finished "Give me liberty or give me death!". Roosevelt said that this new class of ship would bring liberty to Europe, which gave rise to the name Liberty ship.

The first ships required about 230 days to build (Patrick Henry took 244 days), but the median production time per ship dropped to 39 days by 1943. The record was set by SS Robert E. Peary, which was launched 4 days and 15 1/2 hours after the keel had been laid, although this publicity stunt was not repeated: in fact much fitting-out and other work remained to be done after the Peary was launched. The ships were made assembly-line style, from prefabricated sections. In 1943 three Liberty ships were completed daily. They were usually named after famous Americans, starting with the signatories of the Declaration of Independence. Newsreel footage of the launching of the ship named for American author Jack London can be seen in the film Jack London. Seventeen of the Liberty ships were named in honor of outstanding African-Americans. The first, in honor of Booker T. Washington, was christened by Marian Anderson in 1942, and the SS Harriet Tubman, recognizing the only woman on the list, was christened on 3 June 1944.

Any group that raised war bonds worth $2 million could propose a name. Most bore the names of deceased people. The only living namesake was Francis J. O'Gara, the purser of SS Jean Nicolet, who was thought to have been killed in a submarine attack, but in fact survived the war in a Japanese prisoner of war camp; see USS Outpost. Not named after people were: SS Stage Door Canteen, named after the USO club in New York; and SS U.S.O., named after the United Service Organizations (USO).

Another notable Liberty ship was SS Stephen Hopkins, which sank the German commerce raider Stier in a ship-to-ship gun battle in 1942 and became the first American ship to sink a German surface combatant.

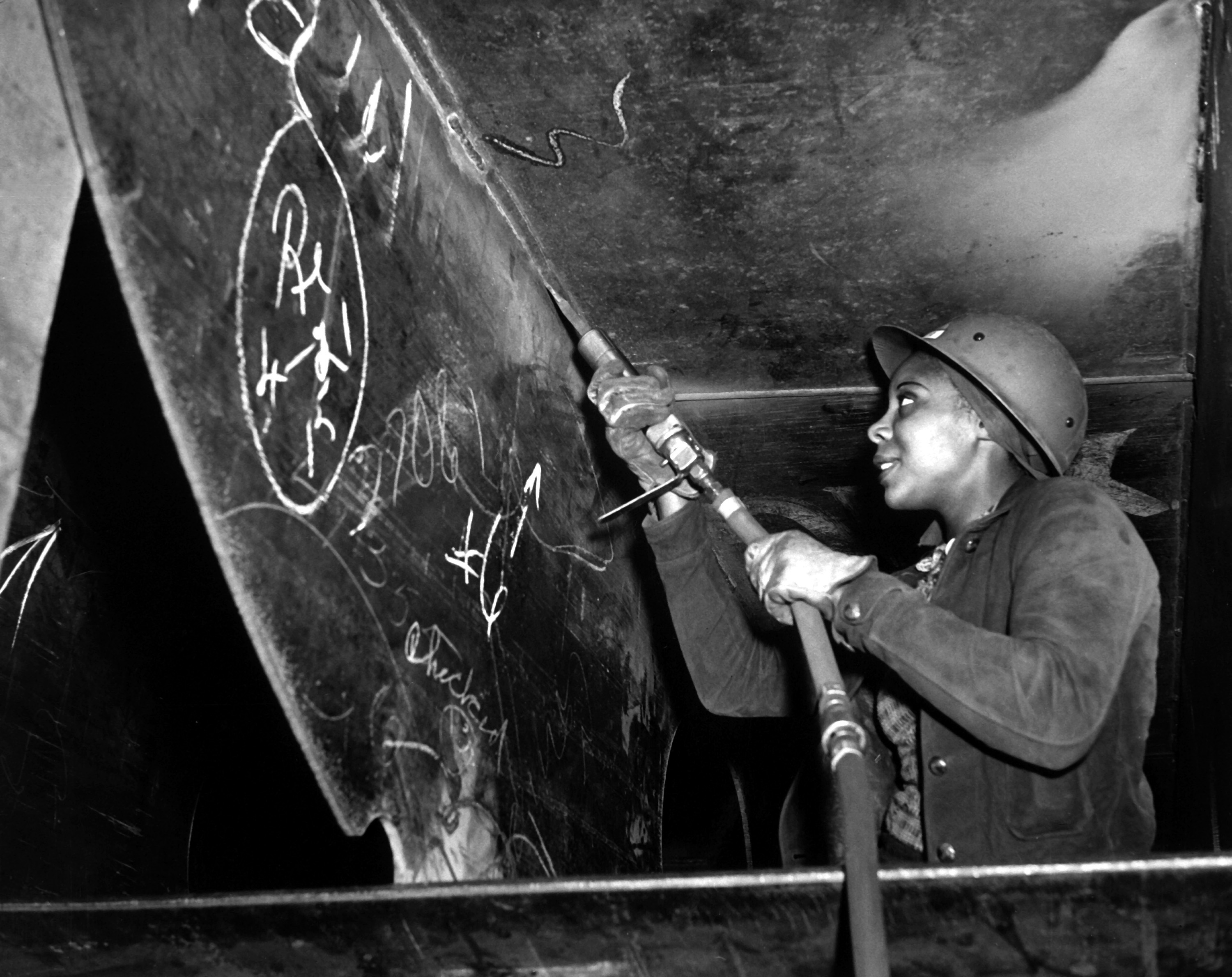
Eastine Cowner, a former waitress, at work on the Liberty ship SS George Washington Carver at the Kaiser shipyards, Richmond, California, in 1943. One of a series taken by E. F. Joseph on behalf of the Office of War Information, documenting the work of African-Americans in the war effort

The wreck of SS Richard Montgomery lies off the coast of Kent with 1,500 short tons (1,400 tonnes) of explosives still on board, enough to match a very small yield nuclear weapon should they ever go off. SS E. A. Bryan detonated with the energy of 2,000 tons of TNT (8,400 GJ) in July 1944 as it was being loaded, killing 320 sailors and civilians in what was called the Port Chicago disaster. Another Liberty ship that exploded was the rechristened SS Grandcamp, which caused the Texas City Disaster on 16 April 1947, killing at least 581 people.

Six Liberty ships were converted at Point Clear, Alabama, by the United States Army Air Force, into floating aircraft repair depots, operated by the Army Transport Service, starting in April 1944. The secret project, dubbed "Project Ivory Soap", provided mobile depot support for B-29 Superfortress bombers and P-51 Mustang fighters based on Guam, Iwo Jima, and Okinawa beginning in December 1944. The six ARU(F)s (Aircraft Repair Unit, Floating), however, were also fitted with landing platforms to accommodate four Sikorsky R-4 helicopters, where they provided medical evacuation of combat casualties in both the Philippine Islands and Okinawa.

The last new-build Liberty ship constructed was SS Albert M. Boe, launched on 26 September 1945 and delivered on 30 October 1945. She was named after the chief engineer of a United States Army freighter who had stayed below decks to shut down his engines after a 13 April 1945 explosion, an act that won him a posthumous Merchant Marine Distinguished Service Medal. In 1950, a "new" Liberty ship was constructed by Industriale Maritime SpA, Genoa, Italy by using the bow section of Bert Williams and the stern section of Nathaniel Bacon, both of which had been wrecked. The new ship was named SS Boccadasse, and served until scrapped in 1962.

Several designs of mass-produced petroleum tanker were also produced, the most numerous being the T2 tanker series, with about 490 built between 1942 and the end of 1945.

=== Problems ===
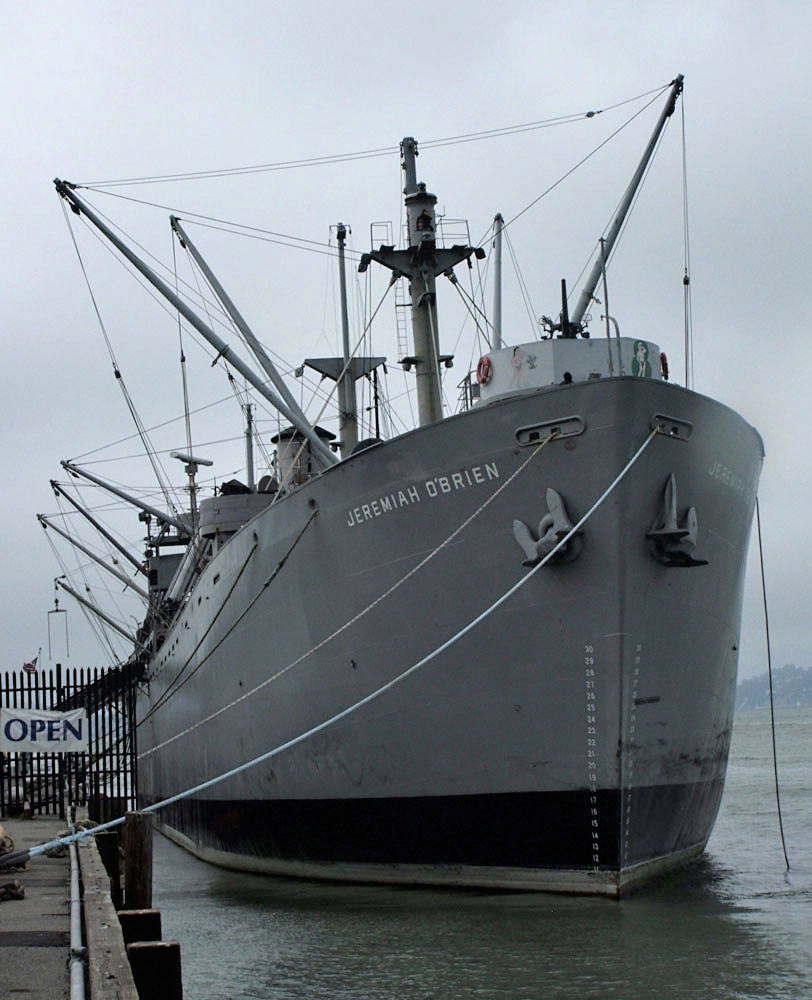
SS Jeremiah O'Brien

==== Hull cracks ====
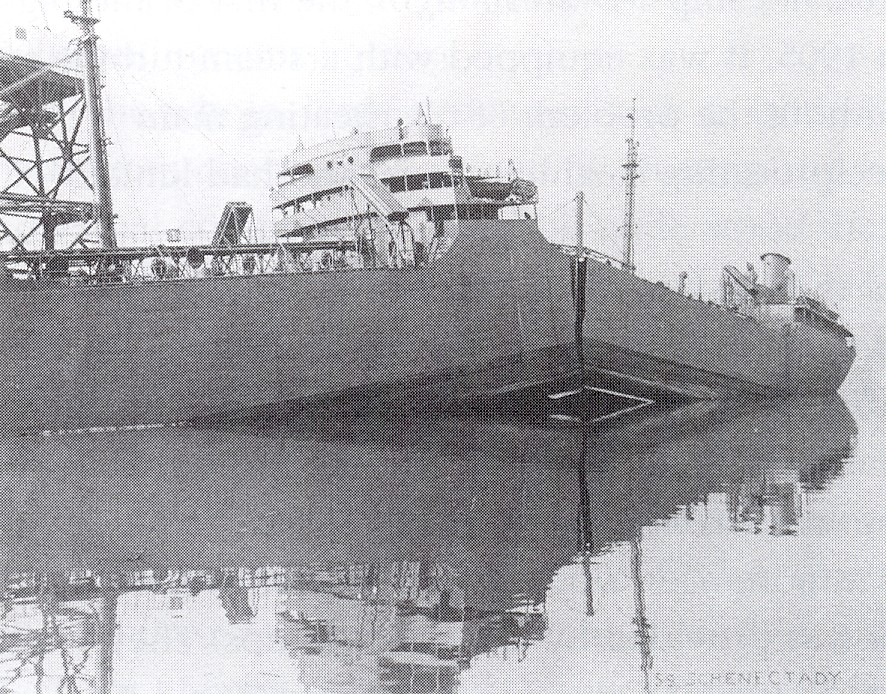
The SS Schenectady split apart by brittle fracture while in harbor, 1943. It was a 152-meter-long T2 tanker.

Early Liberty ships suffered hull and deck cracks, and a few were lost due to such structural defects. During World War II there were nearly 1,500 instances of significant brittle fractures. Twelve ships, including three of the 2,710 Liberty ships built, broke in half without warning, including SS John P. Gaines, which sank on 24 November 1943 with the loss of 10 lives. Suspicion fell on the shipyards, which had often used inexperienced workers and new welding techniques to produce large numbers of ships in great haste.

The Ministry of War Transport borrowed the British-built Empire Duke for testing purposes. Constance Tipper of Cambridge University demonstrated that the fractures did not start in the welds, but were due to the embrittlement of the steel used. When used in riveted construction, however, the same steel did not have this problem. Tipper discovered that at a certain temperature, the steel the ships were made of changed from being ductile to brittle, allowing cracks to form and propagate. This temperature is known as the critical ductile-brittle transition temperature. Ships in the North Atlantic were exposed to temperatures that could fall below this critical point. The predominantly welded hull construction, effectively a continuous sheet of steel, allowed small cracks to propagate unimpeded, unlike in a hull made of separate plates riveted together. One common type of crack nucleated at the square corner of a hatch which coincided with a welded seam, both the corner and the weld acting as stress concentrators. Furthermore, the ships were frequently grossly overloaded, greatly increasing stress, and some of the structural problems occurred during or after severe storms that would have further increased stress. Minor revisions to the hatches and various reinforcements were applied to the Liberty ships to arrest the cracking problem. These are some of the first structural tests that gave birth to the study of materials. The successor Victory ships used the same steel, also welded rather than riveted, but spacing between frames was widened from 30 inches (760 mm) to 36 inches (910 mm), making the ships less stiff and more able to flex.

==== Consequences and results ====
The sinking of the Liberty ships led to a new way of thinking about ship design and manufacturing. Modern ships avoid the use of rectangular corners to avoid stress concentration. New types of steel were developed that have higher fracture toughness, especially at lower temperatures. In addition, more talented and educated welders can produce welds without, or at least with fewer, flaws. While the context and time in which Liberty ships were constructed resulted in many failures, the lessons learned led to new innovations that allow for more efficient and safer shipbuilding today.

== Service ==
=== Use as troopships ===
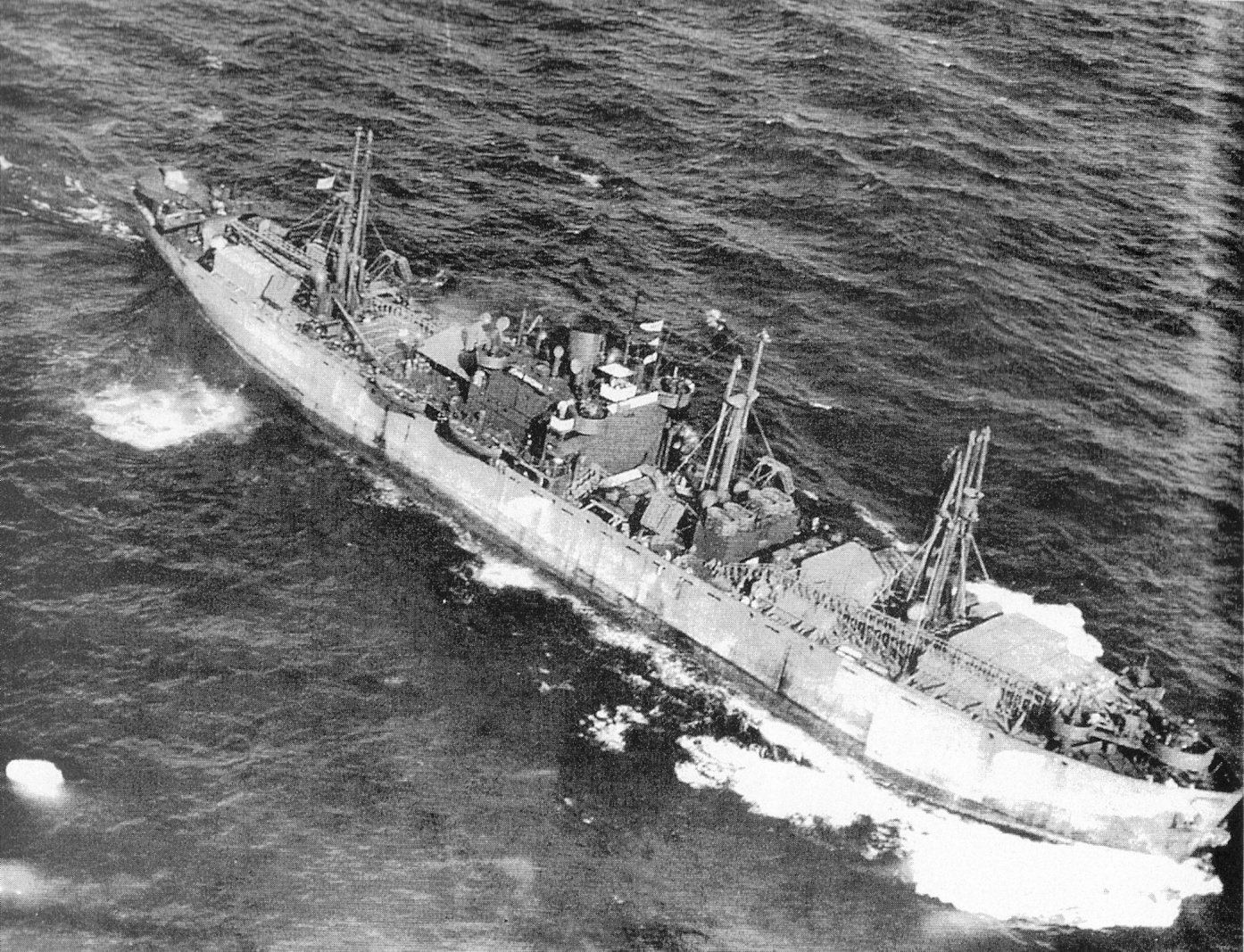
Aerial photograph of the Liberty ship SS John W. Brown outbound from the United States carrying a large deck cargo after her conversion to a "Limited Capacity Troopship". It probably was taken in the summer of 1943 during her second voyage.

In September 1943 strategic plans and shortage of more suitable hulls required that Liberty ships be pressed into emergency use as troop transports with about 225 eventually converted for this purpose. The first general conversions were hastily undertaken by the War Shipping Administration (WSA) so that the ships could join convoys on the way to North Africa for Operation Torch. Even earlier the Southwest Pacific Area command's U.S. Army Services of Supply had converted at least one, William Ellery Channing, in Australia into an assault troop carrier with landing craft (LCIs and LCVs) and troops with the ship being reconverted for cargo after the Navy was given exclusive responsibility for amphibious assault operations. Others in the Southwest Pacific were turned into makeshift troop transports for New Guinea operations by installing field kitchens on deck, latrines aft between #4 and #5 hatches flushed by hoses attached to fire hydrants and about 900 troops sleeping on deck or in 'tween deck spaces. While most of the Liberty ships converted were intended to carry no more than 550 troops, thirty-three were converted to transport 1,600 on shorter voyages from mainland U.S. ports to Alaska, Hawaii and the Caribbean.

The problem of hull cracks caused concern with the United States Coast Guard, which recommended that Liberty ships be withdrawn from troop carrying in February 1944 although military commitments required their continued use. The more direct problem was the general unsuitability of the ships as troop transports, particularly with the hasty conversions in 1943, that generated considerable complaints regarding poor mess, food and water storage, sanitation, heating / ventilation and a lack of medical facilities. After the Allied victory in North Africa, about 250 Liberty ships were engaged in transporting prisoners of war to the United States. By November 1943 the Army's Chief of Transportation, Maj. Gen. Charles P. Gross, and WSA, whose agents operated the ships, reached agreement on improvements, but operational requirements forced an increase of the maximum number of troops transported in a Liberty from 350 to 500. The increase in production of more suitable vessels did allow for returning the hastily converted Liberty ships to cargo-only operations by May 1944. Despite complaints, reservations, Navy requesting its personnel not travel aboard Liberty troopers and even Senate comment, the military necessities required use of the ships. The number of troops was increased to 550 on 200 Liberty ships for redeployment to the Pacific. The need for the troopship conversions persisted into the immediate postwar period in order to return troops from overseas as quickly as possible.

=== Combat ===
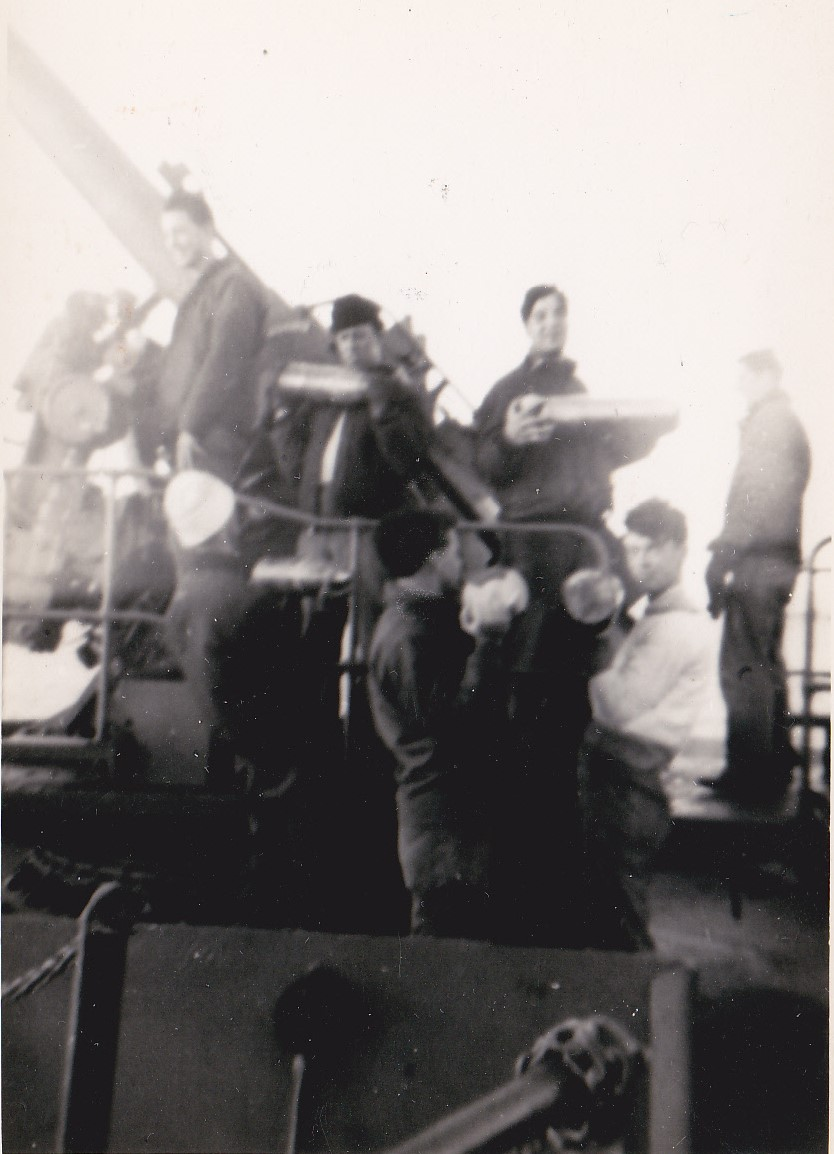
Seamen during shell loading practice aboard SS Lawton B. Evans in 1943

On 27 September 1942 the SS Stephen Hopkins was the only US merchant ship to sink a German surface combatant during the war. Ordered to stop, Stephen Hopkins refused to surrender, so the heavily armed German commerce raider Stier and her tender Tannenfels with one machine gun opened fire. Although greatly outgunned, the crew of Stephen Hopkins fought back, replacing the Armed Guard crew of the ship's single 4-inch (100 mm) gun with volunteers as they fell. The fight was short, and both ships were wrecks.

On 10 March 1943 SS Lawton B. Evans became the only ship to survive an attack by the German submarine U-221. The following year from 22 to 30 January 1944, Lawton B. Evans was involved in the Battle of Anzio in Italy. It was under repeated bombardment from shore batteries and aircraft for eight days. It endured a prolonged barrage of shelling, machine-gun fire and bombs. The ship shot down five German planes.

=== After the war ===
More than 2,400 Liberty ships survived the war. Of these, 835 made up the postwar cargo fleet. Greek entrepreneurs bought 526 ships and Italians bought 98. Shipping magnates including John Fredriksen, John Theodoracopoulos, Aristotle Onassis, Stavros Niarchos, Stavros George Livanos, the Goulandris brothers, and the Andreadis, Tsavliris, Achille Lauro, Grimaldi and Bottiglieri families were known to have started their fleets by buying Liberty ships. Andrea Corrado, the dominant Italian shipping magnate at the time, and leader of the Italian shipping delegation, rebuilt his fleet under the programme. Weyerhaeuser operated a fleet of six Liberty Ships (which were later extensively refurbished and modernized) carrying lumber, newsprint, and general cargo for years after the end of the war.

Some Liberty ships were lost after the war to naval mines that were inadequately cleared. Pierre Gibault was scrapped after hitting a mine in a previously cleared area off the Greek island of Kythira in June 1945, and the same month saw Colin P. Kelly Jnr take mortal damage from a mine hit off the Belgian port of Ostend. In August 1945, William J. Palmer was carrying horses from New York to Trieste when she rolled over and sank 15 minutes after hitting a mine a few miles from destination. All crew members, and six horses were saved. Nathaniel Bacon ran into a minefield off Civitavecchia, Italy in December 1945, caught fire, was beached, and broke in two; the larger section was welded onto another Liberty half hull to make a new ship 30 feet longer, named Boccadasse.

As late as December 1947, Robert Dale Owen, renamed Kalliopi and sailing under the Greek flag, broke in three and sank in the northern Adriatic Sea after hitting a mine. Other Liberty ships lost to mines after the end of the war include John Woolman, Calvin Coolidge, Cyrus Adler, and Lord Delaware.

On 16 April 1947, a Liberty ship owned by the Compagnie Générale Transatlantique called the Grandcamp (originally built as the SS Benjamin R. Curtis) docked in Texas City, Texas to load a cargo of 2,300 tons of ammonium nitrate fertilizer. A fire broke out on board which eventually caused the entire ammonium nitrate cargo to explode. The massive explosion levelled Texas City and caused fires which detonated more ammonium nitrate in a nearby ship and warehouse. It was one of the largest non-nuclear explosions in US history. This incident is known as the Texas City disaster today.

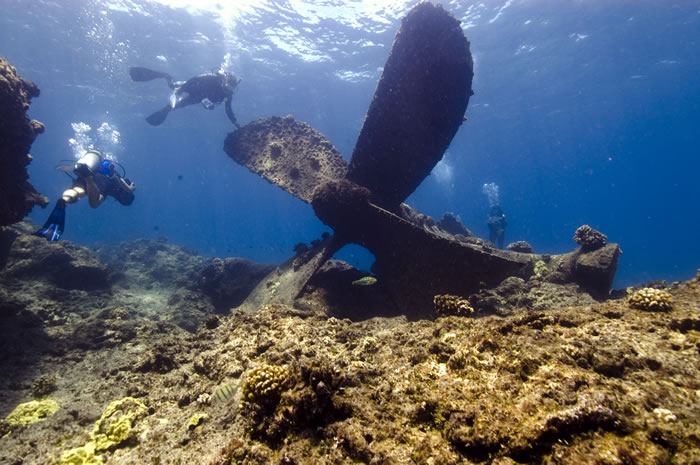
Propeller of the Liberty ship Quartette which ran aground in 1952 on the Pearl and Hermes Atoll in the Pacific Ocean

On 21 December 1952, the SS Quartette, a 422-foot-long (129 m) Liberty ship of 7,198 gross register tons, struck the eastern reef of the Pearl and Hermes Atoll at a speed of 10.5 kn (19 km/h; 12 mph). The ship was driven further onto the reef by rough waves and 35 mph (56 km/h) winds, which collapsed the forward bow and damaged two forward holds. The crew was evacuated by the SS Frontenac Victory the following day. The salvage tug Ono arrived on 25 December to attempt to tow the ship clear, but persistent stormy weather forced a delay of the rescue attempt. On 3 January, before another rescue attempt could be made, the ship's anchors tore loose and the Quartette was blown onto the reef, and deemed a total loss. Several weeks later, it snapped in half at the keel and the two pieces sank. The wreck site now serves as an artificial reef which provides a habitat for many fish species.

In 1953, the Commodity Credit Corporation (CCC), began storing surplus grain in Liberty ships located in the Hudson River, James River, Olympia, and Astoria National Defense Reserve Fleets. In 1955, 22 ships in the Suisun Bay Reserve Fleet were withdrawn to be loaded with grain and were then transferred to the Olympia Fleet. In 1956, four ships were withdrawn from the Wilmington Fleet and transferred, loaded with grain, to the Hudson River Fleet.

From 1955 to 1959, 16 former Liberty ships were repurchased by the U.S. Navy and converted to the Guardian-class radar picket ships for the Atlantic and Pacific Barrier.

In the 1960s, three Liberty ships and two Victory ships were reactivated and converted to technical research ships with the hull classification symbol AGTR (auxiliary, technical research) and used to gather electronic intelligence and for radar picket duties by the United States Navy. The Liberty ships SS Samuel R. Aitken became USS Oxford, SS Robert W. Hart became USS Georgetown, SS J. Howland Gardner became USS Jamestown with the Victory ships being SS Iran Victory which became USS Belmont and SS Simmons Victory becoming USS Liberty. All of these ships were decommissioned and struck from the Naval Vessel Register in 1969 and 1970.

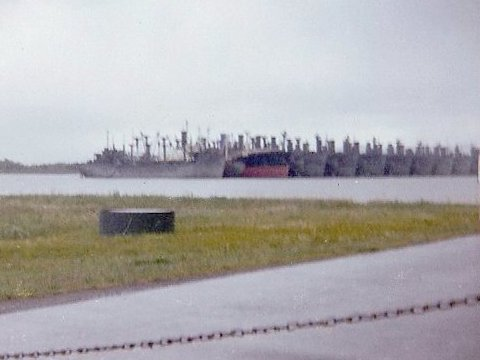
Liberty ships mothballed at Tongue Point, Astoria, Oregon, 1965

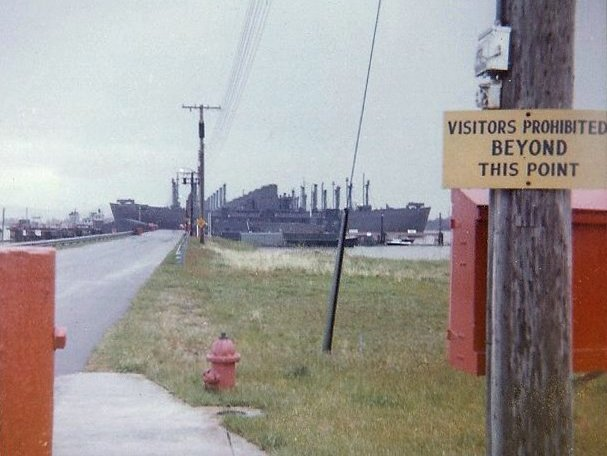
Liberty Ships mothballed at Tongue Point, Astoria, Oregon, 1965

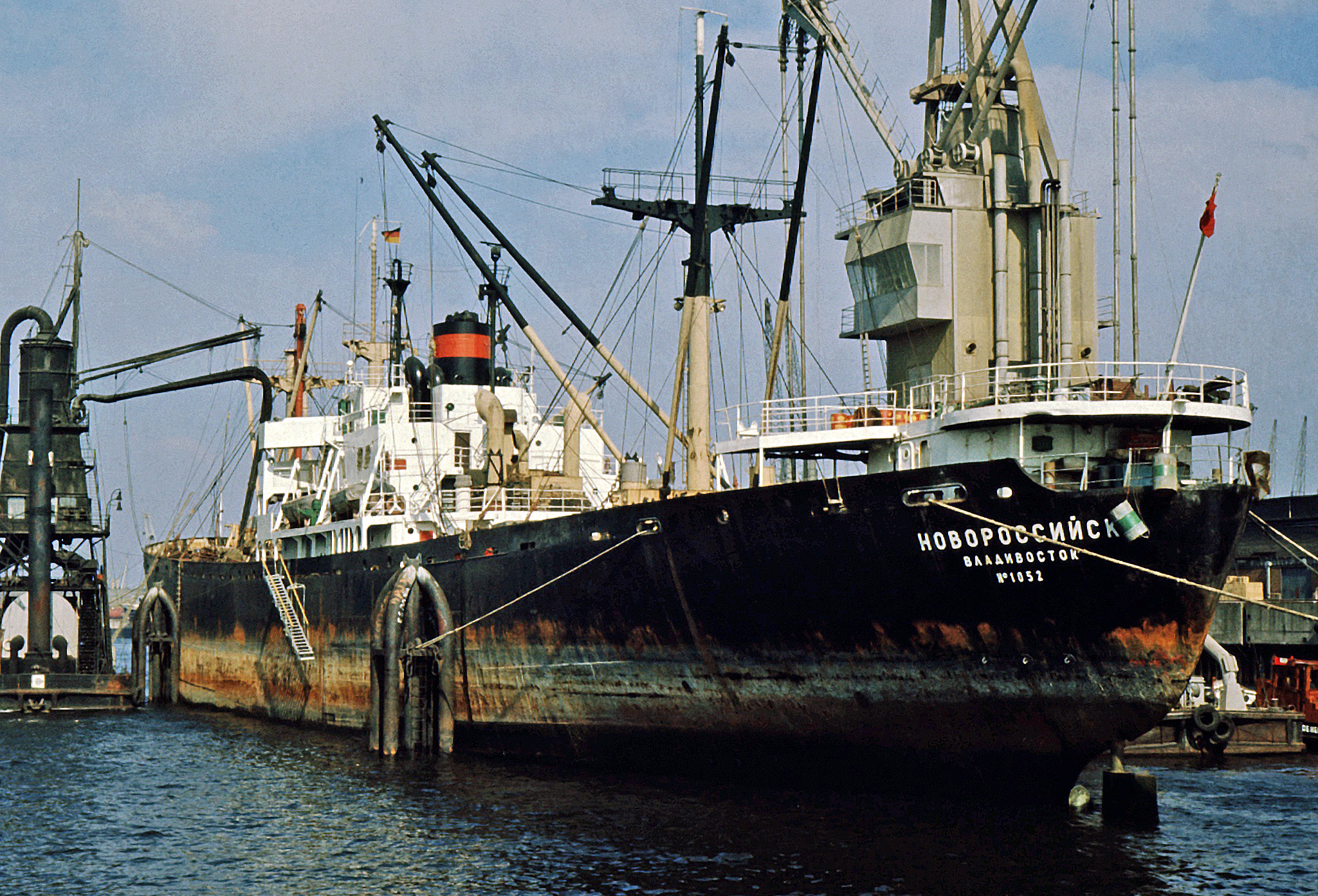
Novorossiysk, delivered 1943 to USSR, sailed until 1974

From 1946 to 1963, the Pacific Ready Reserve Fleet – Columbia River Group, retained as many as 500 Liberty ships.

In 1946, Liberty ships were mothballed in the Hudson River Reserve Fleet near Tarrytown, New York. At its peak in 1965, 189 hulls were stored there. The last two were sold for scrap to Spain in 1971 and the reserve permanently shut down.

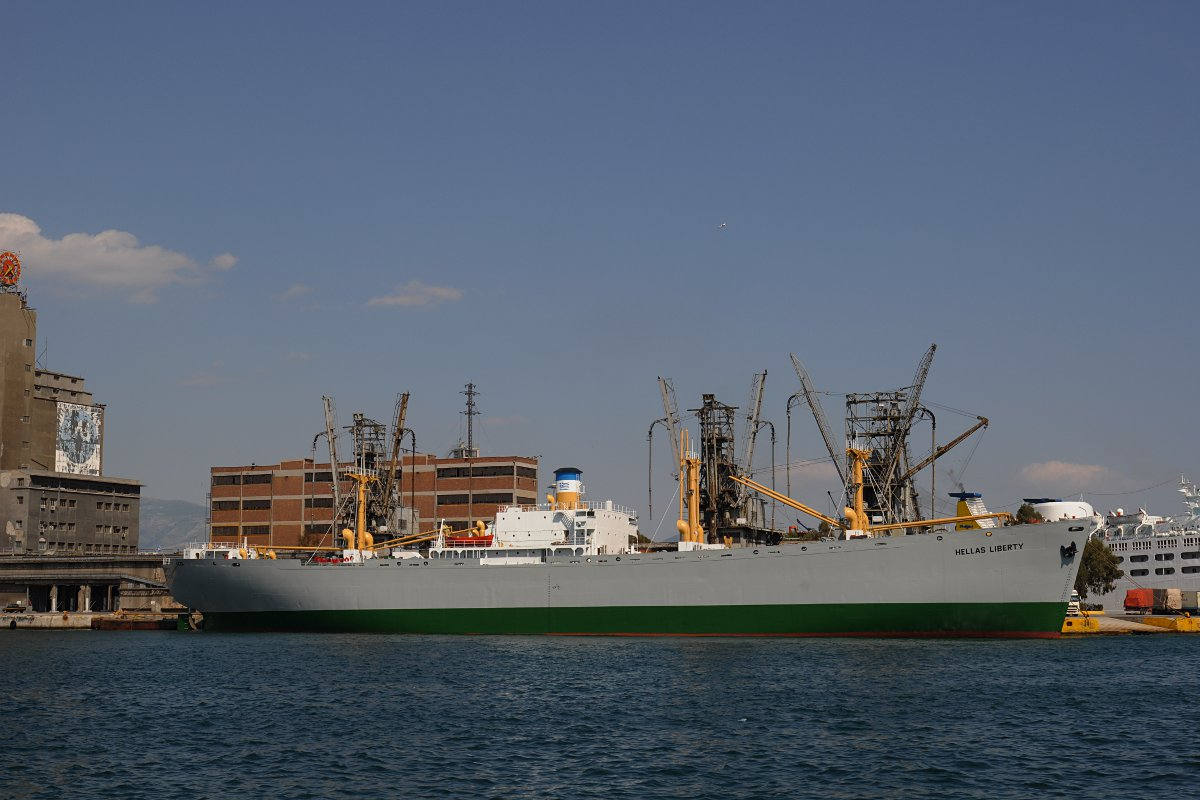
SS Hellas Liberty (ex-SS Arthur M. Huddell), June 2010

Only two operational Liberty ships, SS John W. Brown and SS Jeremiah O'Brien, remain. John W. Brown has had a long career as a school ship and many internal modifications, while Jeremiah O'Brien remains largely in her original condition. Both are museum ships that still put out to sea regularly. In 1994, Jeremiah O'Brien steamed from San Francisco to England and France for the 50th anniversary of D-Day, the only large ship from the original Operation Overlord fleet to participate in the anniversary. In 2008, SS Arthur M. Huddell, a ship converted in 1944 into a pipe transport to support Operation Pluto, was transferred to Greece and converted to a floating museum dedicated to the history of the Greek merchant marine; although missing major components were restored this ship is no longer operational.

Liberty ships continue to serve in a "less than whole" function many decades after their launching. In Portland, Oregon, the hulls of Richard Henry Dana and Jane Addams serve as the basis of floating docks. SS Albert M. Boe survives as the Star of Kodiak, a landlocked cannery, in Kodiak Harbor at 57°47′12″N 152°24′18″W.

SS Charles H. Cugle was converted into MH-1A (otherwise known as USS Sturgis). MH-1A was a floating nuclear power plant and the first ever built. MH-1A was used to generate electricity at the Panama Canal Zone from 1968 to 1975. She was also used as a fresh water generating plant. She was anchored in the James River Reserve Fleet. The ship was dismantled in 2019 in Brownsville, Texas.

Fifty-eight Liberty ships were lengthened by 70 feet (21 m) starting in 1958, giving them additional carrying capacity at a small additional cost. The bridges of most of these were also enclosed in the mid-1960s in accordance with a design by naval architect Ion Livas.

In the 1950s, the Maritime Administration instituted the Liberty Ship Conversion and Engine Improvement Program, which had a goal to increase the speed of Liberty ships to 15 knots (28 km/h; 17 mph), making them competitive with more modern designs, as well as gaining experience with alternate propulsion systems. Four ships were converted in the $11 million program. SS Benjamin Chew had its existing condensers modified and a new superheater and geared turbine installed to give the ship 6,000 shp, up from 2,500. SS Thomas Nelson had its bow lengthened, diesel engines installed in place of the original steam engine, and movable cranes outfitted in place of the original cargo handling gear. The GTS (Gas Turbine Ship) John Sergeant had its bow extended, and its steam engine replaced with a General Electric gas turbine of 6,600 shp, connected to a reversible pitch propeller via reduction gearing. John Sergeant was considered overall to be a success, but problems with the reversible pitch propeller ended its trial after three years. GTS William Patterson had its bow extended and its steam engine replaced with 6 General Electric GE-14 free-piston gas generators, connected to two reversible turbines and capable of 6,000 shp total. William Patterson was considered to be a failure as reliability was poor and the scalability of the design was poor. All four vessels were fueled with Bunker C fuel oil, though John Sergeant required a quality of fuel available at limited ports and also required further treatment to reduce contaminants. Three were scrapped in 1971 or 1972 and the diesel-equipped Thomas Nelson was scrapped in 1981.

In 2011, the United States Postal Service issued a postage stamp featuring the Liberty ship as part of a set on the U.S. Merchant Marine.

== Shipyards ==
Liberty ships were built at eighteen shipyards located along the U.S. Atlantic, Pacific and Gulf coasts:

- Alabama Drydock and Shipbuilding, Mobile, Alabama
- Bethlehem-Fairfield Shipyard, Baltimore, Maryland
- California Shipbuilding Corp., Los Angeles, California
- Delta Shipbuilding Corp., New Orleans, Louisiana
- J.A. Jones Construction Company
  - Panama City, Florida
  - Brunswick, Georgia
- Kaiser Company, Vancouver, Washington
- Marinship, Sausalito, California
- New England Shipbuilding Corporation, South Portland, Maine The East and West Yards were both on the same 60 acres (240,000 m^{2}) of shipyard. However, the two yards commenced operations under different titles and until early 1942 were separated by rigid legal conditions.
  - East Yard
  - West Yard
- North Carolina Shipbuilding Company, Wilmington, North Carolina
- Oregon Shipbuilding Corporation, Portland, Oregon
- Permanente Metals Corporation, Richmond, California (a Kaiser facility)
  - Kaiser Richmond No. 1 Yard
  - Kaiser Richmond No. 2 Yard
- St. Johns River Shipbuilding, Jacksonville, Florida
- Southeastern Shipbuilding Corporation, Savannah, Georgia
- Todd Houston Shipbuilding, Houston, Texas
- Walsh-Kaiser Co., Inc., Providence, Rhode Island
  - Small yard:
- Rheem Manufacturing Company built one ship the SS William Coddington.

== Survivors ==
Riveters from H. Hansen Industries work on the Liberty ship John W. Brown at Colonna's Shipyard, a ship repair facility located in the Port of Norfolk, Virginia, December 2014

There are four surviving Liberty ships.

- SS John W. Brown – operational and in use as a museum ship in Baltimore Harbor, Maryland
- SS Jeremiah O'Brien – operational and in use as a museum ship, docked at Pier 35, San Francisco, California
- SS Arthur M. Huddell – transferred to Greece in 2008 and renamed Hellas Liberty. Restored for use as a maritime museum in Piraeus harbor, Greece.
- SS Albert M. Boe – The last Liberty ship built, sold to private ownership in 1964 and renamed Star of Kodiak. Used as a fish cannery ship. She is currently landlocked but remains the headquarters of Trident Seafoods in Kodiak, Alaska.

== Ships in class ==
=== World War II ===
- EC2-S-AW1 Collier, for coal transport, 24 built by Delta SB.
- EC2-S-C1 dry cargo ships for Merchant Navy
  - Converted to troopships 220 ships
  - Converted to ammunition ships
  - One ship, SS Joseph Holt, had engineering spaces converted to unmanned operation and was used with a reduced Navy crew as a temporary minesweeper in 1945 and 1946.
- EC2-S-C1 converted for US Navy use
  - Acubens-class general stores issue ships (AKS) 11 cargo ships
  - Basilan-class Internal Combustion repair ships (ARG), 2 ships
  - Belle Isle-class General Stores Issue Ships (AKS), 6 ships
  - Crater-class cargo ship (AK) 65 ships
    - Two Crater-class were converted to Aviation Stores Issue Ships (AVS)
  - Chourre-class aircraft repair ships (ARV) 2 ships (1944–1945)
  - Indus-class net cargo ships (AKN), 4 built for support of Net laying ships. (1943–1946)
  - Luzon-class Internal Combustion repair ships (ARG) 12 conversions
  - Xanthus-class repair ship (AR) 5 ships (1944–1946)
  - Five converted to unclassified miscellaneous (IX) dry bulk storage ships for Service Squadron use (Note: these bulk storage ships were USS Peter H. Burnett (IX-104), USS Antelope (IX-109), USS Don Marquis (IX-215), USS Triana (IX-223), USS Inca (IX-229))
- EC2-S-C1 converted for US Coast Guard use
  - American Mariner-class ship, US Coast Guard training (1943–1950)
- EC2-S-C1 converted for US Army use
  - Operation Ivory Soap six conversions to US Army Air Force aircraft repair and maintenance ships in 1944
- Z-ET1-S-C3 converted for US Navy use
  - Armadillo-class tankers (IX) 18 ships for Service Squadrons for bulk storage of fuel oil, or diesel or gasoline, Merchant Navy and US Navy crews
  - Stag-class water distillation ships (IX, later AW), 2 ships for Service Squadrons
- Z-EC2-S-C2, eight Tank carriers, with larger hatches and a 30 tons crane. Built by J.A.Jones Construction in 1943 for Merchant Navy
- Z-EC2-S-C5 ships for Merchant Navy
  - Boxed aircraft transport with large larger hatches and 30 tons crane, 28 built by J.A.Jones Construction

=== Post-World War II ===
- EC2-S-C1 ships for US Army
  - USAS American Mariner, Radar ship (1950–1963)
- EC2-S-C1 ships for US Air Force
  - USAFS American Mariner, Radar ship (1963–1964)
- EC2-S-C1 ships for US Navy
  - USNS American Mariner (T-AGM-12), Radar ship (1964–1966)
  - Two converted to WMD test ships (YAG) with laboratories and air sampling devices (Note: USS George Eastman and USS Granville S. Hall were given the District Auxiliary, Miscellaneous (YAG) hull symbol)
  - Four converted to EC2-S-22a standard to become remote control minesweepers (YAG) (Note: Three ships (MSC hull numbers 2802, 1122, and 2207) were converted and given hull symbols YAG-36, YAG-37, and YAG-38 respectively from the District Auxiliary, Miscellaneous (YAG) sequence. One ship SS R. Ney McNeely (MSC hull 1513) was also converted and was to have been given a YAG symbol but was returned to the inactive fleet after conversion and no YAG hull number was assigned)
- Z-EC2-S-C5 ships for US Navy
  - Guardian-class radar picket ships (YAGR / AGR) 16 converted in 1955
  - Oxford-class technical research ships (AGTR), 3 Sigint ships converted in 1961–1963
- US Army conversion
  - MH-1A first floating nuclear power plant (1967–1976), nicknamed USS Sturgis (Note: Sturgis was the actual name, but the USS prefix could not be used by an Army ship)
- EC2-S-8a SS Benjamin Chew converted to a high-speed cargo ship in 1956
- EC2-M-8b, SS Thomas Nelson converted to a high-speed cargo ship in 1956
- Jumbo Liberty ship, in the 1950s some Liberty ships were lengthened in Japan. The SS Henry M. Stephens became the SS Andros Fairplay.
- LNG, Liquid Natural Gas Carrier conversion by Howaldtswerke Deutsche Werft AG at Kiel, Germany. Example SS Thomas F. Bayard to SS Ultragaz São Paulo in 1952, scrapped in 1972.
- SS William P McArthur was converted to a floating crane in 1966.
- SS Arthur M. Huddell converted to a pipe carrier in 1944, then cable carrier for AT&T in 1956, then and a museum ship in Greece in 2008.
- Floating dock conversions: SS Joe C. S. Blackburn in 1968 and S Jane Addams in 1947.

== See also ==
- Allied technological cooperation during World War II
- Empire ships
- Hog Islander, WW I-designed American cargo ship design that served in WW II
- List of Liberty ships
- Fort ship
- Park ship
- Type C2 ship
- Type T2 tanker
- U.S. Merchant Marine Academy
- Victory ship
- World War II United States Merchant Navy

== Sources ==
- Davies, James (2004). "Liberty Cargo Ship" (PDF). ww2ships.com. p. 23.
- Elphick, Peter (2006). Liberty: The Ships that Won the War. Naval Institute Press. ISBN 1591144515.
- Herman, Arthur (2012). Freedom's Forge: How American Business Produced Victory in World War II. New York: Random House. ISBN 978-1400069644.
- Sawyer, L. A.; Mitchell, W. H. (1985). The Liberty Ships: The history of the "emergency" type cargo ships constructed in the United States during the Second World War. London: Lloyd's of London Press. ISBN 978-1850440499.
- Wise, James E.; Baron, Scott (2004). Soldiers Lost at Sea: A Chronicle of Troopship Disasters (2004 ed.). United States Naval Institute. ISBN 978-1591149668. Total pages: 280
