= SS Albert M. Boe =

Liberty ship of WWII

Coordinates: 57.786521°N 152.404784°W

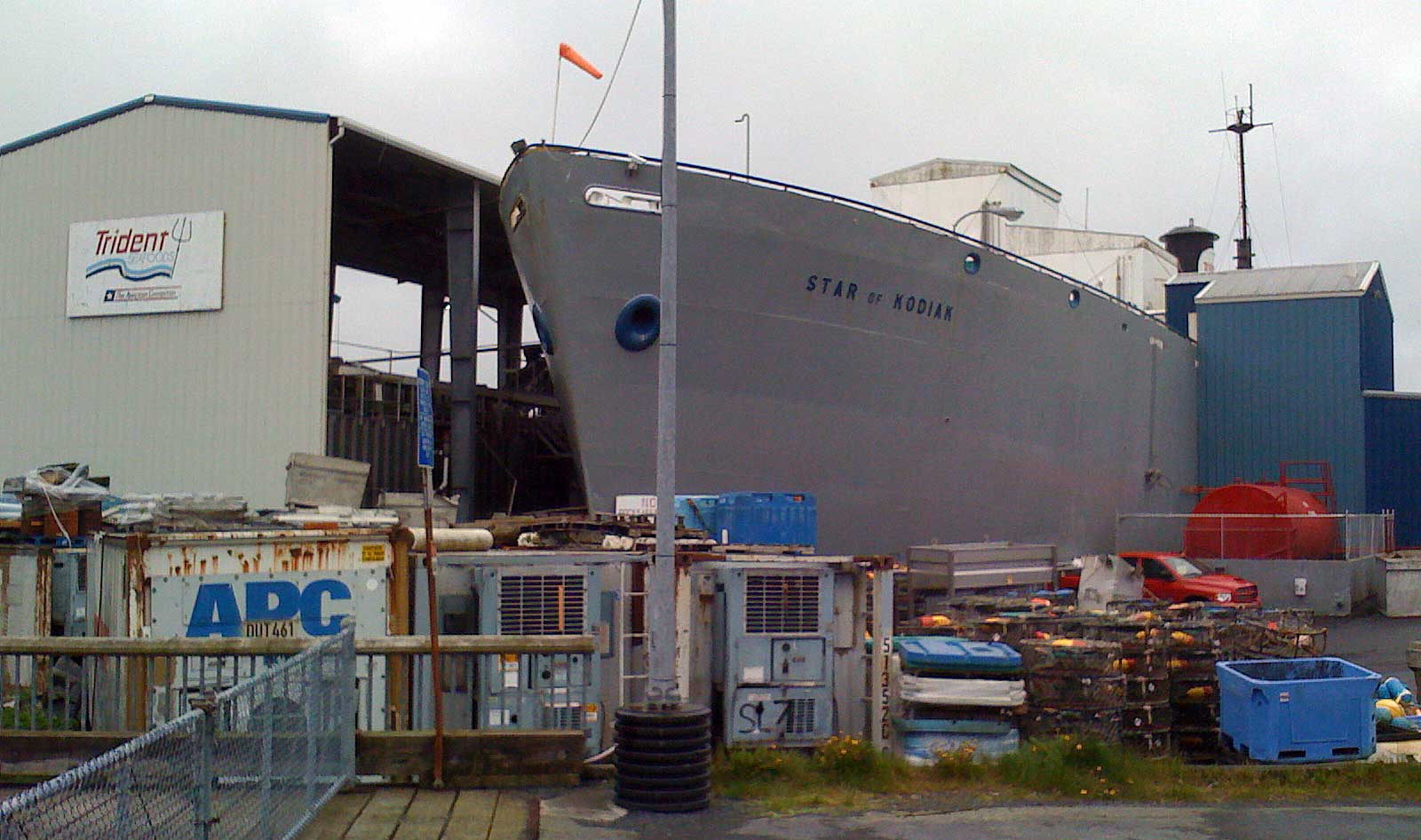
- The former SS Albert M. Boe in its current role as the main office of Trident Seafoods

History

United States
- Name: Albert M. Boe
- Namesake: Merchant Mariner, Chief Engineer, Albert M. Boe
- Builder: New England Shipbuilding Corp., Portland, ME
- Laid down: 11 July 1945
- Launched: 26 September 1945
- Completed: 30 October 1945
- Out of service: 1 December 1953
- Stricken: 11 March 1954
- Identification: Official number 248849
- Fate: Converted to a floating cannery in February 1965, renamed SS Star of Kodiak
- Status: Grounded, but in use

General characteristics
- Class & type: Z-EC2-S-C5
- Tonnage: 10,865 LT DWT; 7,176 GRT
- Displacement: 3,380 long tons (3,434 t) (light); 14,245 long tons (14,474 t) (max)
- Length: 441 feet 6 inches (135 m) oa; 416 feet (127 m) pp; 427 feet (130 m) lwl
- Beam: 57 feet (17 m)
- Draft: 27 ft 9.25 in (8.4646 m)
- Installed power: 2 × Oil fired 450 °F (232 °C) boilers, operating at 220 psi (1,500 kPa); 2,500 hp (1,900 kW)
- Propulsion: 1 × triple-expansion steam engine, (manufactured by Filer and Stowell, Milwaukee, Wisconsin); 1 × screw propeller
- Speed: 11.5 knots (21.3 km/h; 13.2 mph)
- Capacity: 562,608 cubic feet (15,931 m^{3}) (grain); 499,573 cubic feet (14,146 m^{3}) (bale)
- Complement: 38–62 USMM; 21–40 USNAG
- Armament: Varied by ship; Bow-mounted 3-inch (76 mm)/50-caliber gun; Stern-mounted 4-inch (102 mm)/50-caliber gun; 2–8 × single 20-millimeter (0.79 in) Oerlikon anti-aircraft (AA) cannons and/or, 2–8 × 37-millimeter (1.46 in) M1 AA guns

SS Albert M. Boe is a Liberty ship laid down on 11 July 1945 at the East Yard of New England Shipbuilding Corporation in Portland, Maine, as a boxed aircraft transport. The ship is notable as the final Liberty ship built.

She was named after Albert M. Boe, a civilian Chief Engineer who remained in the engine room of the US Army aircraft repair ship FS-214 to stop the engines and fight fires after an engine explosion on 13 April 1945. He suffered fatal burns but was credited with saving the lives of other crew members by that action and received the posthumous Merchant Marine Distinguished Service Medal.

== History ==
Albert M. Boe was assigned hull number 3132 by the U.S. Maritime Commission (USMC), launched on 26 September 1945, assigned official number 248849 and delivered to the War Shipping Administration (WSA) on 30 October 1945. The ship was a special boxed aircraft transport variant of the standard Liberty with four large holds, rather than the usual five and kingpost lifting gear instead of the usual booms. The C5 design varied in other respects from the standard C1 Liberty:

- 7,200 GRT vice 7,170 GRT
- 10,600 DWT vice 10,800 DWT
- 4,300 Net vice 4,380 Net
- 490,000 vice 500,000 Bale cubic capacity

The ship was operated under a WSA agreement by Wessel, Duval & Co. until entering the Wilmington, N.C. Reserve Fleet on 16 November 1946. Albert M. Boe was delivered to the US Army on 17 February 1947 and from 30 October 1945 was operated as USAT Albert M. Boe under bareboat charter from WSA.

On 1 March 1950, due to the reorganization into the Department of Defense and transfer of Army Transportation Service (ATS) ships to the newly formed Military Sea Transportation Service, the ship was transferred to US Navy and placed in service as USNS Albert M. Boe (T-AKV-6). The ship supported operations in the Pacific, Korea, transporting crated aircraft, engines, and spare parts.

Albert M. Boe was removed from service and on 22 January 1954 was transferred to custody of the Maritime Administration entering the Reserve Fleet at Olympia, Washington. On 11 March 1954, she was struck from the Naval Register.

The ship was sold on a bid of $65,556.58 for commercial service awarded on 7 August 1964 to Zidell Explorations, Inc. for non-transportation service. The ship was withdrawn from the reserve fleet on 19 August 1964 and converted for use as the fish cannery ship Star of Kodiak in February 1965. Though currently landlocked, Star of Kodiak is still in use as the Kodiak, Alaska facility of Trident Seafoods.
