= SS John P. Gaines =

World War II Liberty ship of the United States

History

United States
- Name: John P. Gaines
- Namesake: John P. Gaines
- Owner: War Shipping Administration
- Operator: Northland Transportation Company of Seattle
- Builder: Oregon Shipbuilding Corporation
- Laid down: 21 June 1943
- Launched: 11 July 1943
- Fate: Sank on 24 November 1943, off the Aleutian Islands

General characteristics
- Displacement: 14,245 long tons (14,474 t)
- Length: 422.8 ft
- Beam: 57 ft
- Draught: 27 ft 9.25 in
- Propulsion: Two oil-fired boilers, triple expansion steam engine, single screw, 2500 horsepower (1.9 MW)
- Speed: 11 to 11.5 knots (20 to 21 km/h)
- Capacity: 10,856 t (10,685 long tons) deadweight (DWT)

SS John P. Gaines was a Liberty ship built during World War II by the Oregon Shipbuilding Corporation, and named for politician John P. Gaines. Northland Transportation Company was chartering the ship from the Maritime Commission and War Shipping Administration that owned the ship as part of the Merchant navy.

On 24 November 1943 she broke in two and sank with the loss of 10 lives off the Aleutian Islands. It was later determined that the welded construction combined with the grade of steel used had caused embrittlement in cold water that caused a sudden break, as demonstrated by metallurgist Constance Tipper. A number of other Liberty ships suffered similar problems, with three sinking.

== Construction and design ==
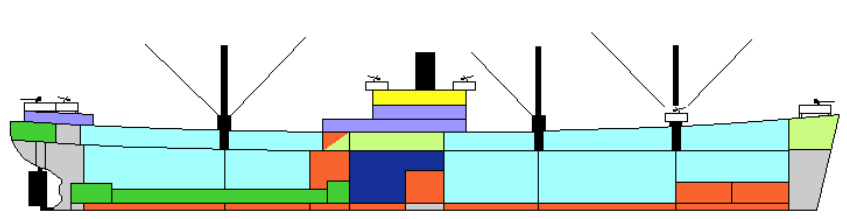
A color-coded diagram of compartments on a Liberty ship, from the starboard side, bow to the right Machinery spaces Command and control Liquid stores Dry cargo Engine room Misc Dry stores Habitation

John P. Gaines was powered by two oil-fired boilers and a single 2,500 hp (1,864 kW) vertical type, triple-expansion reciprocating steam engine. The machinery space (dark blue in the picture) was at the middle of the ship. The single propeller was driven through a long propeller shaft that ran through a tunnel (lower green area in the picture) under the aft cargo holds. The propeller rotated at 76 rpm, giving a speed of about 11 knots (20 km/h; 13 mph). There were two decks running the full length of the ship, with seven watertight bulkheads dividing the machinery space and five cargo holds (light blue in the picture), three ahead of the machinery space and two aft. Crew accommodations were provided in a large three-deck superstructure located in the middle of the ship (medium blue in the picture) directly above the machinery space, and in a small superstructure (medium blue in the picture) located at the stern. The bridge, radio room and Captain's quarters were on the top deck (yellow in the picture) of the three-deck structure. The fuel for the boiler was carried in several tanks (red in the picture) located throughout the ship. Ship's storage (light green in the picture) was located at the bow and above the machinery space. Gun crew quarters and the ship's hospital were in the stern structure. When the ship was armed, the gun 'tubs' (white in the picture) were located at the bow, stern and above the bridge. These could be any mixture of 5 in (130 mm) caliber gun, 4 inches (101.60 mm), 3 in (76 mm), 40 millimetres (1.57 in), 20 millimetres (0.79 in) and/or .5 inches (12.70 mm) caliber guns.

The ship's steering was by a contrabalanced rudder (black, at left in the picture), with its associated steering gear located in a compartment (green in the picture) above the rudder and below the aft structure. Steam-powered generators provided electric power for radios, navigation equipment, refrigeration compressors, pumps, lighting, and degaussing. An evaporator produced fresh water for the boilers and for the crew. Large hatches above the cargo holds allowed steam winches and booms rigged to three centerline masts to quickly load or unload cargo.
