= SS Arthur M. Huddell =

Liberty ship of WWII

Coordinates: 37.942414°N 23.630944°E

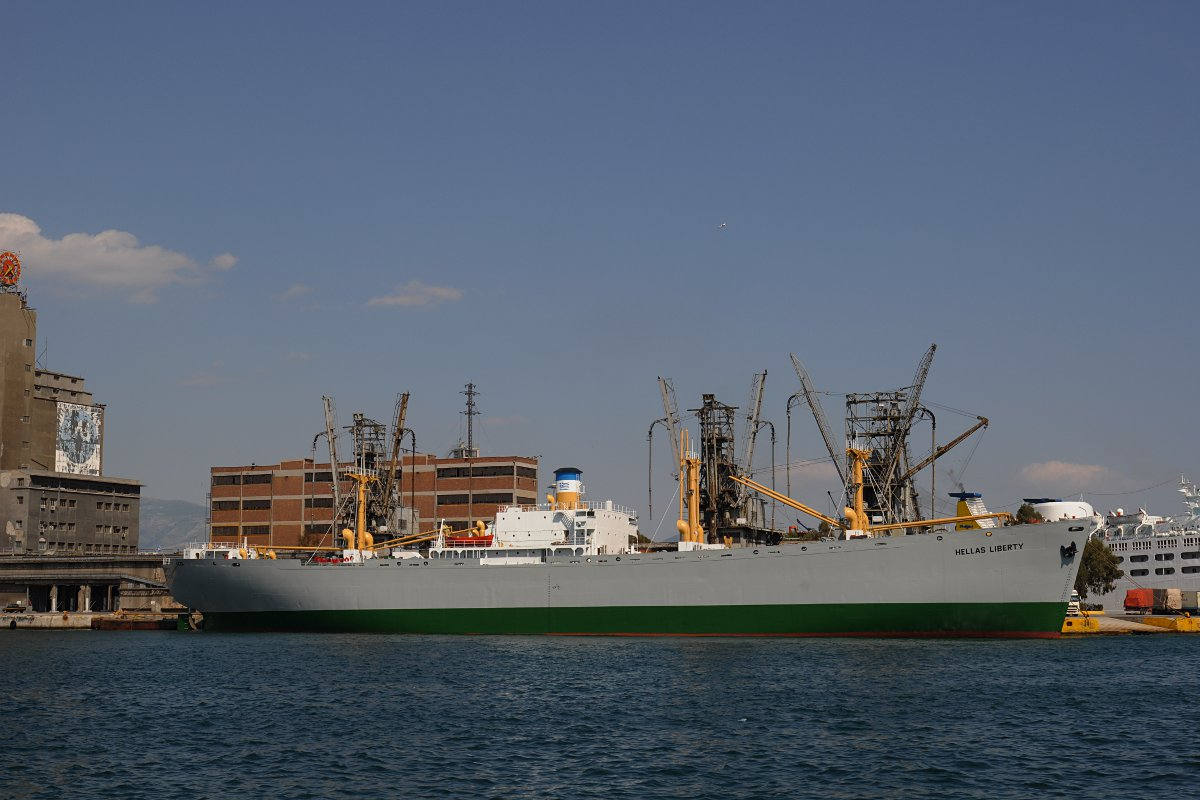
- SS Hellas Liberty in Piraeus Port, Greece after major restoration (2010)

History

United States
- Name: Arthur M. Huddell
- Namesake: Arthur M Huddell
- Owner: War Shipping Administration (WSA)
- Operator: A. H. Bull Steamship Company
- Ordered: as type (EC2-S-C1) hull, MC hull 1215
- Builder: St. Johns River Shipbuilding Company, Jacksonville, Florida
- Cost: $1,401,249
- Yard number: 23
- Way number: 5
- Laid down: 25 October 1943
- Launched: 7 December 1943
- Sponsored by: Mrs. Arthur M. Huddell
- Completed: 18 December 1943
- Identification: U.S. official number: 244760; Call sign: KVDD
- Fate: Laid up in the James River Reserve Fleet, Lee Hall, Virginia, 25 September 1945; Laid up in the Suisun Bay Reserve Fleet, Suisun Bay, California, 11 October 1957; Laid up in the Suisun Bay Reserve Fleet, Suisun Bay, California, 10 July 1964; Laid up in the James River Reserve Fleet, Lee Hall, Virginia, 22 August 1983
- Status: Donated to Greece, 2008

Greece
- Name: Hellas Liberty
- Acquired: 2008
- Identification: IMO number: 5025706; Call sign: SVAD8
- Status: Converted to a museum ship

General characteristics
- Class & type: Liberty ship; type EC2-S-C1, standard
- Tonnage: 10,865 LT DWT; 7,176 GRT
- Displacement: 3,380 long tons (3,434 t) (light); 14,245 long tons (14,474 t) (max)
- Length: 441 feet 6 inches (135 m) oa; 416 feet (127 m) pp; 427 feet (130 m) lwl
- Beam: 57 feet (17 m)
- Draft: 27 ft 9.25 in (8.4646 m)
- Installed power: 2 × Oil fired 450 °F (232 °C) boilers, operating at 220 psi (1,500 kPa); 2,500 hp (1,900 kW)
- Propulsion: 1 × triple-expansion steam engine, (manufactured by Filer and Stowell, Milwaukee, Wisconsin); 1 × screw propeller
- Speed: 11.5 knots (21.3 km/h; 13.2 mph)
- Capacity: 562,608 cubic feet (15,931 m^{3}) (grain); 499,573 cubic feet (14,146 m^{3}) (bale)
- Complement: 38–62 USMM; 21–40 USNAG
- Armament: Varied by ship; Bow-mounted 3-inch (76 mm)/50-caliber gun; Stern-mounted 4-inch (102 mm)/50-caliber gun; 2–8 × single 20-millimeter (0.79 in) Oerlikon anti-aircraft (AA) cannons and/or, 2–8 × 37-millimeter (1.46 in) M1 AA guns

SS Arthur M. Huddell is a Liberty ship built in the United States during World War II and is now a museum ship, SS Hellas Liberty, in Greece.

She was named after Arthur M. Huddell, an American union leader. Huddell had been president of the Boston Central Labor Union, vice president of the International Engineers’ Union, and president of the International Union of Operating Engineers (IUOE).

From delivery on 18 December 1943, the ship was operated by an agent for the War Shipping Administration until laid up in September 1945, with a brief operating period in 1947. Between October 1947 and February 1956, the ship was in long-term layup. In 1956, Arthur M. Huddell began operations as a cable transport for the American Telephone and Telegraph Company (AT&T).

The Historic American Engineering Record for the ship notes its significance as an existing Liberty ship example, its role in Operation PLUTO (pipeline-under-the-sea), its later work as a cable transport for the AT&T communications cable installations, and for the installation of the Sound Surveillance System (SOSUS) until 1983. In 2009, Arthur M. Huddell was donated to Greece to serve as the museum ship Hellas Liberty. The fully restored ship is on display in the Port of Piraeus, Athens.

== Construction ==
Arthur M. Huddell was laid down on 25 October 1943, under a Maritime Commission (MARCOM) contract, MC hull 1215, by the St. Johns River Shipbuilding Company, Jacksonville, Florida; she was sponsored by Mrs. Arthur M. Huddell, the widow of the namesake, and was launched on 7 December 1943. The ship, assigned official number 244760, was delivered to the War Shipping Administration (WSA) on 18 December 1943 with A.H. Bull & Co., Inc. assigned as the WSA operating agent under a general agency agreement.

== War history ==
After Arthur M. Huddell loaded explosives and general cargo in Jacksonville, she sailed for New York, in February 1944, where she joined a convoy for London. Following the completion of this voyage, the ship returned to Norfolk, Virginia, in March 1944, before at the end of April 1944 departing from Charleston, South Carolina, with a cargo of explosives to Oran, in Algeria.

During the summer of 1944, the ship was modified with number 4 and 5 holds converted to carry coiled pipe for the construction of a fuel pipeline under the English Channel as part of Operation PLUTO supporting the Normandy landings. She departed New York, 22 September 1944, carrying 70 mi (110 km) of pipe and general cargo. She then spent 84 days in London, unloading 17 mi (27 km) of pipe into a cable-laying ship and unloading the remainder at the dock. This turned out to be Arthur M. Huddell's first and only fuel pipe transport mission.

For the remainder of the war and immediate post-war period, she carried coal, general cargo, and personnel. Departing in February 1945, the ship carried coal in a convoy from Hampton Roads in Virginia to Marseilles in France before returning the following month to Philadelphia. In May 1945, the ship departed transporting general cargo to Naples in Italy, and Oran in Algeria, before returning to New York.

In June 1945, the ship transported coal to Marseilles in France before continuing on to Port de Bouc from where it carried 619 French and Moroccan troops to Oran in Algeria. In July of that year the ship returned to Baltimore, Maryland before making a voyage to New York before the Maritime Commission laid up the ship in the James River Reserve Fleet, Lee Hall, Virginia, 25 September 1945, with $20,000 worth of costly repairs needed.

Between 15 February 1947 and 9 October 1947 the ship was again assigned under a general agency agreement and bareboat charter to A.H. Bull before being again laid up in the Reserve Fleet.

== Post war history ==
As the ship's pipe and cable-handling fittings had been left intact, she was chartered by AT&T, 23 February 1956, and converted to a cable transport and layer. After operations delivering undersea telephone and communication cables laid between the US mainland, Hawaii and Alaska, in support of the Distant Early Warning (DEW) line, the ship was transferred to the Suisun Bay Reserve Fleet, Suisun Bay, California on 11 October 1957.

After a brief service in 1963, she was again returned to Suisun Bay on 10 July 1964. On 13 December 1977, the US Navy took delivery of the Arthur M. Huddell, and after its propeller, lifeboats, and most of its equipment had been removed, the ship was reclassified as a barge in July 1978 to support cable operations for the Sound Surveillance System (SOSUS).

Two years later, following the loading of cables from the Simplex Wire & Cable Company pier in Newington, the vessel was again employed in cable transport operations, this time in conjunction with the cable ship Long Lines. In 1982, the Arthur M. Huddell was used in US Navy cable-laying operations in the Pacific. Once this work was completed, the vessel was again laid up at James River Fleet, 22 August 1983. After that date, many components, including the rudder, were removed and used as spare parts for SS John W. Brown.

By the late 1970s, the US reserve fleet had considerably increased due to Victory ships being decommissioned following the end of the Vietnam War. As a result, there was no need to retain in the reserve the few remaining Liberty ships, which led to most being scrapped or scuttled with obsolete ammunition or to create dive and fishing reefs. By the end of the 20th century, the SS Arthur M. Huddell was one of three Liberty ships remaining afloat, the others being SS John W. Brown and SS Jeremiah O'Brien. both of which had been restored and preserved following dedicated lobbying and hard work by US preservation groups.

== Museum ship ==
Of the 1,272 ships operating under the Greek flag at the start of World War II, 914 were lost during the course of the war. Following the end of the war, all of the undamaged Allied shipyards were operating at full capacity, building replacement ships for their own fleets. Greece was among a number of countries wanting to rebuild their fleets. In response, the United States passed a law in March 1946 allowing the sale of American vessels to foreign nationals. In July of that same year, the US Maritime Commission decided to sell ships for cash or on credit to allied governments or individuals from allied powers who could produce a letter of guarantee from the state.

As a result, a number of Greek shipowners who had dollars in American banks bought Liberty ships, with many registering them in Honduras, Panama, and the United States. Those shipowners without this source of funds asked the Greek state to provide them with a letter of guarantee, which on 6 April 1946, the Greek government issued for the purchase of up to 100 Liberty ships. Backed by this financial guarantee, Greek shipowners were able to purchase 98 Liberty ships from the US Government between December 1946 and April 1947.

Further, Greek purchases of Liberty ships continued through the 1950s, with the peak occurring in 1963 before the number in the Greek fleet began declining in 1964. Of the 722 Liberties in service in 1966, 603 were owned by Greeks. By the early 1970s, Greeks controlled the biggest commercial fleet in the world. As the Liberty ships had formed the foundations on which their post-war merchant fleet was built, the Greek shipping community referred to the Liberties as the “blessed ships”. To honor the service of the Liberties, several members of the Greek shipping industry developed a vision of acquiring a Liberty-type ship for conversion into a floating museum in Greece. While the Arthur M. Huddell was awaiting its turn to be scuttled as a fish reef, an exchange of communications between Greece and officials in the United States began in an effort to obtain the ship for Greece. Shipowner Spyros M. Polemis played a significant role in activating members of the Greek Diaspora to assist in this effort. As a result of the efforts of US politicians of Greek heritage headed by Rhode Island Senator Leonidas Raptakis and Connecticut congressman Dimitrios Yiannaros approval was given for the gifting of the Arthur M. Huddell to Greece with legislation being passed by the US Congress to allow the transfer of ownership.

The relative agreement was signed on between US Maritime Administrator Sean Connaughton and Greek Minister of Merchant Marine, Georgios Voulgarakis on 30 June 2008. The ship was subsequently towed in the next month to a repair facility in Norfolk, Virginia for the necessary inspections and preparations before on 6 December 2008 the ship left Norfolk under tow by the Polish tug Posidon, and arrived at Piraeus on 11 January 2009.

The project, still without formal Greek government support, was largely financed by Greek shipowners. In January 2009 Arthur M. Huddell was officially transferred to Greece after several years mitigating hazardous materials and negotiations and was renamed Hellas Liberty. General repairs and conversions took place at Perama and Salamis, during 2009 and 2010, including installation of a new rudder and propeller. The rudder was fabricated new in Greece, but the propeller was donated by the United States government to the Greek government. The propeller was a spare Victory ship propeller, which has the same diameter of 18 ft (5.5 m) as on a Liberty ship. The difference is that the Liberty has an output of 2,500 hp (1,900 kW), while the Victory has 7,500 hp (5,600 kW). They had a different pitch, but as it isn't turning, it doesn't make a difference. In June 2010, she was presented to the public in her restored form in Piraeus Harbor in Athens.

Other work was undertaken to restore the vessel, as near as possible, to being a sistership to the Greek Liberties of the post-war years, including changing the grey paint that had covered her hull and superstructure throughout her the service of the US Government to more commercial colours.

== Bibliography ==
- "St. John's River Shipbuilding, Jacksonville FL". ShipbuildingHistory.com. 16 October 2010.
- Maritime Administration. "Arthur M. Huddell". Ship History Database Vessel Status Card. U.S. Department of Transportation, Maritime Administration.
- Davies, James (May 2004). "Specifications (As-Built)" (PDF). p. 23.
- Gerhardt, Frank A. "Arthur M. Huddell". United States Maritime Commission – 1936 thru 1950.
- Clayton, Brian (2011). Liberty Ship / Pipe Carrier Arthur M. Huddell - Design type: EC2-S-Cl (PDF). Historic American Engineering Record (HAER No. VA-132) (Report). National Park Service, U.S. Department of the Interior.
- Harlaftis, Gelina (19 July 2012). "Cornerstone of Greek shipping: 100 Liberties". Ekathimerini.
- Greek Shipping Miracle. "The Hellas Liberty Museum". Greek Shipping Miracle. Archived from the original on 6 December 2020.
- Hellenic Communication Service (14 April 2009). "The Return of an 'Old Loved One' to Greece Last Liberty Arrives to Become a Museum". HCS Article Index or Archives: History--American-Hellenic. Hellenic Communication Service.
- Ship Management International (14 January 2009). "Last Liberty ship reaches Greece". Elaborate Communications Limited. Archived from the original on 28 May 2022.
- "System Log 1949 – 20XX" (PDF). SOSUS/IUSS: Monitoring the World's Oceans. IUSS/CAESAR Alumni Association.
- Pournara, Margarita (29 November 2017). "The little-known story of the Liberty ships and the miracle of Greek shipping". Ekathimerini.
- Young, Victor (October 2020), "Hellas Liberty: A floating museum and a 'blessed ship'", Ships Monthly: 52–55
