= SS John Sergeant =

Liberty ship of WWII

History

United States
- Name: John Sergeant
- Namesake: John Sergeant
- Owner: War Shipping Administration (WSA)
- Operator: Marine Transport Lines, Inc.
- Ordered: as type (EC2-S-C1) hull, MCE hull 63
- Awarded: 14 March 1941
- Builder: Bethlehem-Fairfield Shipyard, Baltimore, Maryland
- Cost: $1,075,184
- Yard number: 2050
- Way number: 2
- Laid down: 6 July 1942
- Launched: 21 August 1942
- Completed: 5 September 1942
- Refit: converted to EC2-G-8f, 26 September 1956
- Identification: Call sign: KGKG
- Fate: Laid up in the National Defense Reserve Fleet, Mobile, Alabama, 23 July 1948; Laid up in the National Defense Reserve Fleet, Beaumont, Texas, 7 October 1949; Laid up in the National Defense Reserve Fleet, Wilmington, North Carolina, 18 July 1952; Withdrawn from fleet for conversion, 14 September 1955; Transferred to the Military Sea Transportation Service, 26 September 1956

United States
- Name: John Sergeant
- Owner: Military Sea Transportation Service
- Operator: United States Lines Co.
- Cost: $2,450,000 (refit cost)
- In service: 26 September 1956
- Out of service: 11 September 1959
- Fate: Laid up in the James River Reserve Fleet, Lee Hall, Virginia, 11 September 1959 Sold for scrapping, 28 March 1972, withdrawn from fleet, 20 April 1972

General characteristics
- Class & type: Liberty ship; type EC2-S-C1, standard
- Type: EC2-G-8f (1955-) (refit)
- Tonnage: 10,865 LT DWT; 7,176 GRT
- Displacement: 3,380 long tons (3,434 t) (light); 14,245 long tons (14,474 t) (max)
- Length: 441 ft 6 in (134.57 m) oa; 467 ft 3 in (142.42 m) oa (refit)
- Beam: 57 feet (17 m)
- Draft: 27 ft 9.25 in (8.4646 m)
- Installed power: 2 × Oil fired 450 °F (232 °C) boilers, operating at 220 psi (1,500 kPa) (removed in refit); 2,500 hp (1,900 kW); gas generators (refit); Gas turbine; 6,000 hp (4,500 kW) (refit)
- Propulsion: 1 × triple-expansion steam engine, (manufactured by Worthington Pump & Machinery Corp, Harrison, New Jersey) (removed in refit); 1 × Geared reduction drive (refit); 1 × screw propeller
- Speed: 11.5 knots (21.3 km/h; 13.2 mph); 18 kn (33 km/h; 21 mph) (refit trial)
- Capacity: 562,608 cubic feet (15,931 m^{3}) (grain); 499,573 cubic feet (14,146 m^{3}) (bale)
- Complement: 38–62 USMM; 21–40 USNAG
- Armament: Varied by ship; Bow-mounted 3-inch (76 mm)/50-caliber gun; Stern-mounted 4-inch (102 mm)/50-caliber gun; 2–8 × single 20-millimeter (0.79 in) Oerlikon anti-aircraft (AA) cannons and/or, 2–8 × 37-millimeter (1.46 in) M1 AA guns
- Notes: New cargo handling gear installed during refit

SS John Sergeant was a Liberty ship built in the United States during World War II. She was named after John Sergeant, an American politician who represented Pennsylvania in the United States House of Representatives. He was the National Republican Party's vice presidential nominee in the 1832 presidential election, serving on a ticket with Senator Henry Clay.

== Construction ==
John Sergeant was laid down on 6 July 1942, under a Maritime Commission (MARCOM) contract, MCE hull 63, by the Bethlehem-Fairfield Shipyard, Baltimore, Maryland; and was launched on 21 August 1942.

== History ==
She was allocated to Marine Transport Lines, Inc., on 5 September 1942.

On 23 July 1948, she was laid up in the National Defense Reserve Fleet, Mobile, Alabama. On 7 October 1949, she was laid up in the National Defense Reserve Fleet, Beaumont, Texas. On 18 July 1952, she was laid up in the National Defense Reserve Fleet, Wilmington, North Carolina. On 14 September 1955, she was withdrawn from the fleet for test conversion to rotary compression pump fed open cycle gas turbine power. The Newport News Shipbuilding and Drydock Company, Newport News, Virginia, performed the conversion and she was reclassified EC2-G-8f. Her hull was lengthened at the bow to 467 ft 3 in (142.42 m), and new rotary compressor gas generator and General Electric gas turbine, producing 6,000 shp (4,500 kW), connected directly to the ship's propeller through double reduction gear, were installed. At trials she ran over 18 kn (33 km/h; 21 mph), above the requested 15 kn (28 km/h; 17 mph).

After conversion she was transferred to the Military Sea Transportation Service. She was operated by United States Lines Co. under a bareboat charter. During her first 27,000 nmi (50,000 km; 31,000 mi) she averaged 15.4 kn (28.5 km/h; 17.7 mph) and consumed an average of 236 bbl (37.5 m^{3}) of fuel per day, or 0.677 bbl (0.1076 m^{3}) per mile.

On 11 September 1959, she was laid up in the James River Reserve Fleet, Lee Hall, Virginia. She was sold for scrapping on 28 March 1972, to Peck Iron & Metal Co., Inc., for $38,208. She was removed from the fleet, 20 April 1972.

== Bibliography ==
- "Bethlehem-Fairfield, Baltimore MD". www.ShipbuildingHistory.com. 14 August 2008.
- Maritime Administration. "John Sergeant". Ship History Database Vessel Status Card. U.S. Department of Transportation, Maritime Administration.
- Davies, James (May 2004). "Specifications (As-Built)" (PDF). p. 23.
- "SS John Sergeant".
- "Liberty ship conversion and engine improvement program : cumulative report of progress as of November 1, 1957". 1 November 1957.
