= USS Mark =

Cargo ship of the United States Navy

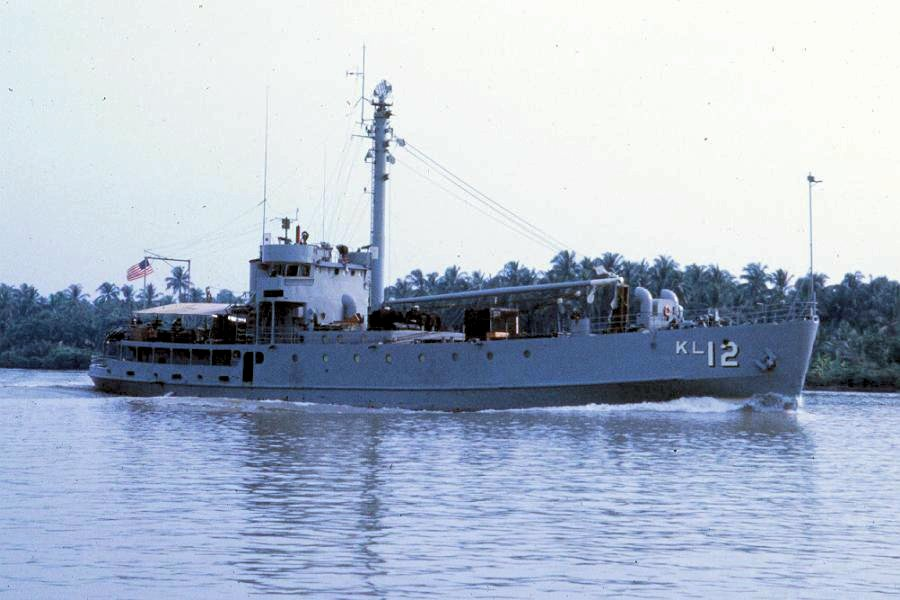
- USS Mark in South Vietnam, circa in 1966

History

United States

U.S. Army service:
- Name: FS-214
- Builder: Higgins Industries
- Yard number: 80
- Completed: December 1944
- Out of service: 30 September 1947

U.S. Navy service:
- Acquired: 30 September 1947
- Renamed: USS Mark (AG-143)
- In service: 2 December 1947
- Reclassified: AKL-12, 13 March 1949
- Commissioned: 1 October 1965
- Decommissioned: 1 July 1971
- Fate: Transferred to Taiwan, 1971
- Stricken: 15 April 1976

Taiwan
- Name: ROCS Yung Kang (AKL 514)
- Commissioned: 1 July 1971
- Fate: Unknown

General characteristics
- Type: Design 427 coastal freighter
- Displacement: 693 long tons (704 t)
- Length: 180 ft (55 m)
- Beam: 33 ft (10 m)
- Draft: 10 ft (3.0 m)
- Speed: 13 knots (24 km/h; 15 mph)
- Complement: 39

USS Mark (AG-143), was built as the Aircraft Repair variant, Design 427, of the Army FS types as FS-214 for use by the United States Army. She was built at Higgins Industries, New Orleans, Louisiana, completed in December 1944. The ship was designed with the well deck covered to provide shop space for the work of repairing aircraft by an embarked Aircraft Maintenance Unit (Floating). (Note: See the description of the 16th Aircraft Maintenance Unit (Floating) deployment in the 801st Special Operations Aircraft Maintenance Squadron (AFSOC) factsheet at Air Force Historical Research Agency for sister ship FS-215.)

The ship suffered a casualty when the ship's starboard engine exploded on 13 April 1945. Albert M. Boe, the civilian Chief Engineer, stayed at his post to shut down engines despite burns that were fatal. He was awarded the posthumous Merchant Marine Distinguished Service Medal. Later a ship was named in his honor.

Toward the close of the war the vessels were assigned names and the ship was renamed Colonel Raymond T. Lester, an Army Air Corps officer.

The ship was acquired by the United States Navy at Subic Bay, Philippine Islands, on 30 September 1947; and placed in service on 2 December 1947.

== Service history ==
Mark served as a unit in the Subic–Sangley Ferry Service until reclassified AKL-12 on 13 March 1949. Then, as a light cargo ship attached to Service Force, 7th Fleet, she carried cargo and passengers to various units of that fleet operating in the Philippines area. The ship was placed 'Out of Service' in 1956, but continued operations out of Subic Bay.

With the escalation of U.S. Forces activities in Southeast Asia in 1963–64, the range of her resupply missions were extended to include frequent cruises to South Vietnam. As a result of these trips, she was placed in a commissioned status on 1 October 1965. For the next eight months she continued to operate from Subic Bay; but with each passing month, the length of her visits was increased. In June 1966 she commenced full-time operations in the combat area. In addition to supply missions the ship surveyed waters critical to operations in the Dinh River, Dong Nia River and Bassac River of the Mekong Delta. From 1966 to 1969 Mark, with only one interruption for overhaul, kept vital supplies moving from Saigon and Vung Tau to the riverine and coastal surveillance forces conducting operations Game Warden and Market Time.

On 1 July 1971 Mark was transferred to Taiwan where she served in the Republic of China Navy as the intelligence gathering ship Yung Kang (AKL 514). She was sold outright on 1 May 1976.
