= Constance Tipper =

British metallurgist and crystallographer (1894–1995)

- Born: Constance Fligg Elam; 16 February 1894; New Barnet, Hertfordshire
- Died: 14 December 1995 (aged 101); Penrith, Cumbria
- Education: Newnham College, Cambridge
- Occupation: Metallurgist
- Spouse: George Howlett Tipper (m. 1928)

Constance Tipper (born Constance Fligg Elam; 16 February 1894 – 14 December 1995) was an English metallurgist and crystallographer. She investigated brittle fracture and the ductile-brittle transition of metals used in the construction of warships, and was the first female full-time faculty member at Cambridge University Department of Engineering.

== Early life and career ==
Constance Fligg Elam was born in New Barnet, Hertfordshire, the daughter of surgeon William Henry Elam, and Lydia Coombes. She was educated at Saint Felix School, Southwold before studying engineering at Newnham College, Cambridge (1912). Tipper achieved a third class in Part I of the Natural Science Tripos.

In 1915 she joined the Metallurgical Department of the National Physical Laboratory in Teddington, but moved in 1916 to the Royal School of Mines, where in 1917 she was appointed research assistant to Sir Harold Carpenter and, in 1921, elected to the Frecheville Research Fellowship. Also in 1917 she was elected a member of the Institute of Materials. It was subsequently arranged that she should work at the Cavendish Laboratory, Cambridge. In 1923, under the name C. F. Elam she received the Royal Society's Bakerian Medal with G. I. Taylor. Unfortunately, the Royal Society had not realized that she was a woman and their dinner club did not allow women attendees.

In 1924 she was appointed to the first Research Fellowship in Metallurgy given by the Worshipful Company of Armourers and Braziers. In 1927, Elam attended the Second (Triennial) Empire Mining and Metallurgical Congress, held in Montreal, Canada, between 22 August and 28 September. She wrote of the congress and her impressions of her two months travelling in Canada and America for The Woman Engineer journal, published by the British Women's Engineering Society, of which she was a member.

In 1928, Elam married George Tipper, a graduate of Clare College, Cambridge, and the superintendent of the Geological Survey in India. When she left the Royal School of Mines in 1929, with a DSc, she settled in Cambridge and continued her work there for over 30 years. Tipper was appointed as a lecturer in the department of engineering from 1939, as one of the first women lecturers in the university at a time when many male lecturers went off to wartime work.

In 1949 Tipper was appointed as a reader at Cambridge University, becoming the only full-time woman member of the faculty of engineering. She remained at Cambridge until her retirement in 1960. Following her retirement, Tipper continued to work as a consultant in the North-West of England, advising on metallurgy in submarine construction. Her 100th birthday in 1994 was celebrated by Newnham College with the planting of the Tipper Tree, a sweet chestnut.

== Research ==
Tipper specialised in the investigation of metal strength and its effect on engineering problems. Her research with G. I. Taylor on distortion of aluminium crystals under tension received the 1923 Royal Society Bakerian Medal, although Tipper was prevented from attending the celebratory dinner due to being a woman. This research later inspired Taylor's explanation of plastic deformation by dislocations.

During World War II she investigated the causes of brittle fracture in Liberty Ships. These ships were built in the US between 1941 and 1945, and were the first all-welded pre-fabricated cargo ships. Tipper established that the fractures were not caused by welding, but were due to the properties of the steel itself. She demonstrated that there is a critical temperature below which the fracture mode in steel changes from ductile to brittle. Because ships in the North Atlantic were subjected to low temperatures, they were susceptible to brittle failure. While these fatigue cracks would not propagate beyond the edges of riveted steel plates, they were able to spread across the welded joints in the Liberty ships. She developed what is now known as the "Tipper Test" to help ensure that the metal used in ship construction was sufficiently sound.

She was the first person to use a scanning electron microscope (SEM) to examine metallic fracture faces. She used a scanning electron microscope built by Charles Oatley and his team, the second SEM ever built. Dr Tipper was awarded the Thomas Lowe Gray Prize, jointly with Professor J F Baker, for their paper 'The Value of the Notch Tensile Test', read before the Institution of Mechanical Engineers in October 1955.

The International Congress on Fracture awards the Constance Tipper Silver Medal to mid-career scientists and engineers who have made significant contributions in any aspect of research in the field of fracture.

== Awards and honours ==
- 1923 Royal Society Bakerian Medal
- 1933 Beilby Medal and Prize
- 1936–38 Leverhulme Trust Research Fellowship

== Works ==
- Carpenter, H. C. H.; Elam, Constance F. (December 1921). "The production of single crystals of aluminium and their tensile properties". Proceedings of the Royal Society of London. Series A, Containing Papers of a Mathematical and Physical Character. 100 (704): 329–353. Bibcode:1921RSPSA.100..329C. doi:10.1098/rspa.1921.0089. JSTOR 93990.
- Deformation of Metal Crystals (Oxford University Press, 1935)
- The Brittle Fracture Story (Cambridge University Press, 1962)
- Publication: The fracture of mild steel plate. Report no. R3 (The Admiralty Ship welding Committee) [illustr.] London 1948
- Brittle fracture of mild steel plates (British Iron and Steel Research Association Procs. of a conf at the Engineering Laboratory, Cambridge University, 26 Oct 1945 p. 23–50 abstracted in Journal of the Iron and Steel Institute Oct 1947 p 300)
- Elam, C. F. (27 April 1938). "The influence of rate of deformation on the tensile test with special reference to the yield point in iron and steel". Proceedings of the Royal Society of London. Series A. Mathematical and Physical Sciences. 165 (923): 568–592. Bibcode:1938RSPSA.165..568E. doi:10.1098/rspa.1938.0077. JSTOR 97041. S2CID 136748791.
- Elam, C. F. (January 1936). "The distortion of β -brass and iron crystals". Proceedings of the Royal Society of London. Series A. Mathematical and Physical Sciences. 153 (879): 273–301. Bibcode:1936RSPSA.153..273E. doi:10.1098/rspa.1936.0002. JSTOR 96486. S2CID 119833803.
- The distortion of metal crystals (Oxford: Clarendon Press, 1935)
- Baker, J.F. and Tipper, C.F. (1956) The Value of the Notch Tensile Test. Proceedings of the Institution of Mechanical Engineers 1956 170:1, 65–93
- Elam, Constance F. (May 1934). "Slip-bands and Twin-like Structures in Crystals". Nature. 133 (3367): 723. Bibcode:1934Natur.133Q.723E. doi:10.1038/133723a0. S2CID 4032998.
