= USNS Private Jose F. Valdez =

Technical research ship

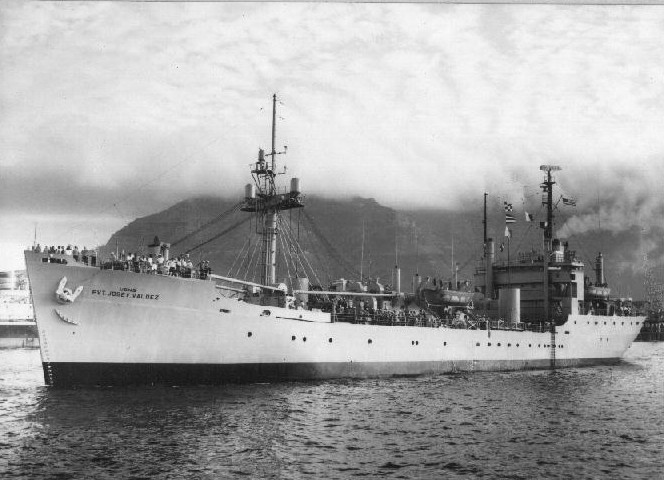
- USNS Jose F. Valdez (T-AG-169)

History

United States
- Name: Joe P. Martinez; Round Splice; Private Jose F. Valdez
- Namesake: Joe P. Martinez; Round splice knot; Jose F. Valdez
- Ordered: as type (C1-M-AV1) hull, MC hull 2245
- Builder: Walter Butler Shipbuilders, Duluth, Minnesota
- Laid down: 22 April 1944
- Launched: 27 October 1944
- Acquired: 5 July 1945
- Commissioned: 12 July 1945 as USAT Private Jose F. Valdez
- Out of service: 2 September 1950
- Fate: Transferred to the US Navy

United States
- Name: Private Jose F. Valdez
- Acquired: 2 September 1950
- In service: 2 September 1950
- Out of service: 22 December 1959
- Reclassified: Transport ship
- Identification: Hull symbol: T-APc-119
- Notes: Returned to Reserve Fleet
- Acquired: 29 August 1961
- In service: 29 August 1961
- Out of service: 7 November 1969
- Reclassified: Technical research ship
- Stricken: 15 August 1976
- Home port: Brooklyn, New York
- Identification: Hull symbol: T-AG-1169
- Fate: Sold for scrap, 27 July 1977

General characteristics
- Type: C1-M-AV1
- Displacement: 6,070 long tons (6,167 t)
- Length: 388 ft 8 in (118.47 m)
- Beam: 50 ft (15 m)
- Draft: 18 ft (5.5 m)
- Installed power: 1 × Nordberg Diesel TSM 6 diesel engine; 1,700 hp (1,268 kW)
- Propulsion: 1 × shaft
- Speed: 11.5 knots (21.3 km/h; 13.2 mph)
- Complement: Approximately 55 civilians and 100 Navy personnel (USNS)
- Armament: 1 × 3 inches (76 mm)/50 caliber gun

USNS Private Jose F. Valdez (T-AG-169), named after World War II Medal of Honor recipient PFC Jose F. Valdez, was a technical research ship in operation during the 1960s. The "Galloping Ghost of the Ivory Coast" or "Grey Ghost of the African Coast", as she was affectionately called by her crew, was deployed around Africa from 1961 until 1969.

== Army service, 1945–1949 ==
Private Jose F. Valdez, originally Joe P. Martinez, was laid down by Walter Butler Shipbuilders, Duluth, Minnesota, 22 April 1944; was launched as Round Splice on 27 October 1944; sponsored by Mrs. Guy R. Porter; and transferred to the American Ship Building Company, Chicago, Illinois, for completion on 15 December 1944; and delivered to the U.S. Army for operation 16 February 1945. The ship was delivered to the War Shipping Administration for operation by its agent American Export Lines at New Orleans on 5 July 1945 and then allocated for operation by the U.S. Army under bareboat charter on 12 July. Round Splice was one of 35 C1-M-AV1 vessels delivered to the Southwest Pacific Area's permanent local fleet with arrival in that fleet between 14 September and 16 December 1945 with designation in that fleet as X-350 into January 1946. The Round Splice was transferred to the War Department 30 August 1946 and renamed Private Jose F. Valdez.

== Transfer to the Navy, 1950–1959 ==
On 2 September 1950 she was acquired by the United States Navy, designated T-APC-119, and assigned to Military Sea Transportation Service. Crewed by the civil service, she operated in the Gulf of Mexico and Caribbean areas until August 1951. Between then and December she cruised the Mediterranean Sea and in January 1952 began runs to Newfoundland and Greenland which continued until she was ordered inactivated in late 1959. On 22 December she arrived in the James River National Defense Reserve Fleet berthing area and was transferred to the custody of the Maritime Administration.

== Technical Research Ship, 1961–1969 ==
Private Jose F. Valdez was reacquired by the Navy in August 1961. Converted to a Technical Research Ship and reassigned to MSTS, she departed Brooklyn, her homeport, in November 1961 on the first of her extended hydrographic cruises to the South Atlantic and Indian Oceans.

The USNS designation indicates that the ship was crewed by civilians. A crew of approximately 55 civilians operated the ship while a detachment of approximately 100 Navy personnel carried out the research operations. The Navy detachment typically included three officers; almost all enlisted men were Communications Technicians (a rating that has been renamed Cryptologic Technician). An advantage of the USNS designation is that the ship was not required to return to an American port on a regular basis. Thus the first deployment of Private Jose F. Valdez started in 1961 and she did not return to the USA until 1967.

=== Operation in African waters ===
Since the "Happy Jose" did not regularly return to the US, the crew was rotated by flying them to a major port city in Africa, such as Cape Town. This occurred on an annual basis. The old crew would be flown back to the USA.

Private Jose F. Valdez was typically at sea for about 30 days and then spent four or five days in port. Some of the sub-Saharan ports of call, from West to East, were Dakar, Senegal; Freetown, Sierra Leone; Monrovia, Liberia; Abidjan, Ivory Coast; Lagos, Nigeria; Brazzaville, Republic of Congo; Luanda, Angola; Walvis Bay, Southwest Africa (now Namibia); Cape Town, South Africa; Port Elizabeth, South Africa; Durban, South Africa; Lourenço Marques (now Maputo), Mozambique; and Mombasa, Kenya.

=== A brush with fate ===
In May 1967 tensions were rising in the Middle East between Israel and her Arab neighbors; this resulted in the Six-Day War in June 1967. The National Security Agency (NSA) decided to deploy a SIGINT collection ship to the area to monitor the situation. Most of the technical research ships were too far away: Oxford and Jamestown were in Southeast Asia, Georgetown and Belmont were in South America, and USNS Sgt. Joseph E. Muller was off Cuba.

Choice of a ship for the operation narrowed between Private Jose F. Valdez, then headed from the eastern Mediterranean to Gibraltar, and USS Liberty in port at Abidjan, Ivory Coast. The NSA selected Liberty because she had superior cruising speed (18 knots vs. 8 knots for Private Jose F. Valdez), because her VHF/UHF multichannel collection capability was better, and because she was, unlike Private Jose F. Valdez, at the beginning of a deployment. On 23 May 1967 Liberty was diverted for duty in the eastern Mediterranean. Liberty stopped at Rota on 1 June and departed the next day for the eastern Mediterranean. Eastbound Liberty passed westbound Private Jose F. Valdez on the night of June 5/6. June 7 Contact X (Private Jose F. Valdez was Contact A ) removed from Liberty's navigation chart. Seven days after arriving Rota, Liberty was attacked by Israeli forces and suffered heavy damages, with 34 crew members killed and 171 injured (see USS Liberty incident). Private Jose F. Valdez arrived in Bayonne, New Jersey in June 1967.

=== Final deployments ===
After repair and overhaul, Private Jose F. Valdez departed for her second extended tour in the African region on 18 September 1967. She returned to the USA unexpectedly early in September 1968 for installation of Technical Research Ship Special COMMunications (TRSSCOMM), a system that could relay messages directly to Washington by bouncing a microwave signal off the moon. This was not a new system; it had already been used on Liberty and Oxford. This system consisted of a sixteen-foot, dish shaped antenna mounted on a movable platform and capable of bouncing a 10,000 watt microwave signal off a particular spot on the moon and down either to the receiving station at Cheltenham, Maryland, or to one of the other Navy SIGINT ships. The TRSSCOMM had the advantage of being able to transmit large quantities of intelligence information very rapidly without giving away the ship's location to hostile direction finding equipment or interfering with incoming signals. But its major disadvantage is that it could only work if the moon was visible and the stabilization system worked properly.

The third extended deployment commenced on 22 January 1969 when Private Jose F. Valdez transited to Africa via Recife, Brazil. Private Jose F. Valdez was ordered home later that year to prematurely end her final deployment. All the vessels in the Technical Research Fleet were inactive by 1970.

== Final fate ==
The Maritime Administration assumed custody of Private Jose F. Valdez on 7 November 1969. She was struck from the Naval Vessel Register, 15 August 1976 and transferred for disposal. She, and three other ships, were sold on 27 July 1977 to Consolidated-Andy Inc., Brownsville, Texas for $309,999 and scrapped by that company later that year.

== Bibliography ==
- Maritime Administration (7 November 1969). "PRIVATE JOSE F. VALDEZ (APC-119/AG-169)". Ship History Database Vessel Status Card. Maritime Administration. Archived from the original on August 9, 2016.
- Masterson, Dr. James R. (1949). U. S. Army Transportation In The Southwest Pacific Area 1941-1947. Washington, D. C.: Transportation Unit, Historical Division, Special Staff, U. S. Army.
- Naval History And Heritage Command (10 November 2015). "'Private Jose F. Valdez'". Dictionary of American Naval Fighting Ships. Naval History And Heritage Command.
