= Jose F. Valdez =

United States Army Medal of Honor recipient

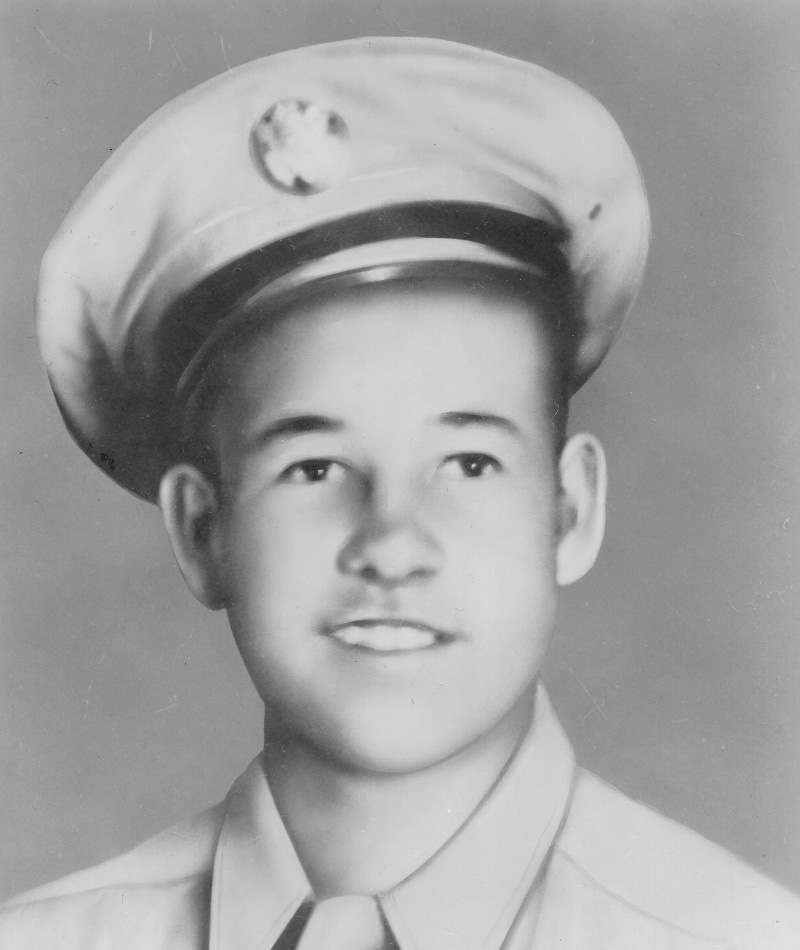
- PFC Jose F. Valdez, Medal of Honor recipient
- Born: January 3, 1925; Gobernador, New Mexico, US
- Died: February 17, 1945 (aged 20) near Houssen, France
- Burial place: Santa Fe National Cemetery, Santa Fe, New Mexico
- Military career
- Allegiance: United States
- Branch: United States Army
- Service years: 1944–1945
- Rank: Private First Class
- Units: Company B 7th Infantry; 3d Infantry Division
- Conflicts: World War II: Western Allied invasion of France; Colmar Pocket †
- Awards: Medal of Honor; Purple Heart

Private First Class Jose Francisco Valdez (January 3, 1925 – February 17, 1945), later known as Jose Frank Valdez, was a United States Army soldier who posthumously received the Medal of Honor for his heroic actions during World War II. Valdez was born in Gobernador, New Mexico and enlisted in the U.S. Army in June 1944. Assigned to Company B, 7th Infantry Regiment, 3rd Infantry Division, he fought in the Battle of the Colmar Pocket in January 1945. On January 25, near Bennwihr station, France (then referred to as Rosenkranz by the Germans), Valdez volunteered to cover his patrol's retreat under heavy fire, despite being severely wounded. His actions saved his comrades, and he died of his injuries three weeks later. Valdez was posthumously awarded the Medal of Honor in 1946 for his extraordinary bravery. He is honored with various memorials, including the USNS Private Jose F. Valdez (T-AG-169) and a monument in Gobernador, New Mexico.

== Early years ==
Valdez was born on January 3, 1925, in Gobernador, New Mexico, a small rural community that has since become a ghost town. Of Mexican descent, he grew up working on nearby ranches to support his family. His father, Jose Venceslas Valdez, died in 1929, and his mother, Maria Julianita Vigil Valdez, raised him. Valdez enlisted in the U.S. Army at a recruiting station in Santa Fe, New Mexico, in June 1944. After completing basic training, he was assigned to the 3rd Infantry Division.

== World War II ==
Valdez served in the 3rd Infantry Division under Major General John W. O'Daniel, which fought in North Africa, Sicily, Italy, France, and Germany. In January 1945, the division engaged in the Battle of the Colmar Pocket to liberate Alsace from German control.

On January 25, 1945, near Bennwihr station, France—then referred to as Rosenkranz by the Germans—Valdez's patrol faced an enemy counterattack. Valdez opened fire on an approaching tank with his automatic rifle, forcing it to retreat. Moments later, he killed three enemy soldiers in a firefight. When two German companies launched a larger attack, Valdez volunteered to cover his patrol's withdrawal under intense fire, despite being wounded. His Medal of Honor citation states he "delivered a protective screen of bullets," ensuring the safety of his comrades. Valdez also called in artillery and mortar fire to halt the German advance.

Although he managed to drag himself back to American lines, Valdez succumbed to his injuries three weeks later on February 17, 1945. His sacrifice is remembered as an act of extraordinary bravery that repelled an overwhelming enemy force and saved the lives of his fellow soldiers.

== Medal of Honor citation ==
Jose F. Valdez
Rank and organization: Private First Class, U.S. Army, Company B, 7th Infantry, 3rd Infantry Division.
Place and date: Near Rosenkrantz, France, January 25, 1945.
Entered service at: Pleasant Grove, Utah.
Born: Gobernador, New Mexico
G.O. No.: 16, February 8, 1946.
Citation

He was on outpost duty with 5 others when the enemy counterattacked with overwhelming strength. From his position near some woods 500 yards beyond the American lines he observed a hostile tank about 75 yards away, and raked it with automatic rifle fire until it withdrew. Soon afterward he saw 3 Germans stealthily approaching through the woods. Scorning cover as the enemy soldiers opened up with heavy automatic weapons fire from a range of 30 yards, he engaged in a fire fight with the attackers until he had killed all 3. The enemy quickly launched an attack with 2 full companies of infantrymen, blasting the patrol with murderous concentrations of automatic and rifle fire and beginning an encircling movement which forced the patrol leader to order a withdrawal. Despite the terrible odds, Pfc. Valdez immediately volunteered to cover the maneuver, and as the patrol 1 by 1 plunged through a hail of bullets toward the American lines, he fired burst after burst into the swarming enemy. Three of his companions were wounded in their dash for safety and he was struck by a bullet that entered his stomach and, passing through his body, emerged from his back. Overcoming agonizing pain, he regained control of himself and resumed his firing position, delivering a protective screen of bullets until all others of the patrol were safe. By field telephone he called for artillery and mortar fire on the Germans and corrected the range until he had shells falling within 50 yards of his position. For 15 minutes he refused to be dislodged by more than 200 of the enemy; then, seeing that the barrage had broken the counter attack, he dragged himself back to his own lines. He died later as a result of his wounds. Through his valiant, intrepid stand and at the cost of his own life, PFC Valdez made it possible for his comrades to escape, and was directly responsible for repulsing an attack by vastly superior enemy forces.

== Awards and recognitions ==
=== Awards ===
Medal of Honor
Purple Heart
American Campaign Medal
European-African-Middle Eastern Campaign Medal
World War II Victory Medal
French Croix de Guerre
French Croix de guerre Fourragère

=== Honors ===
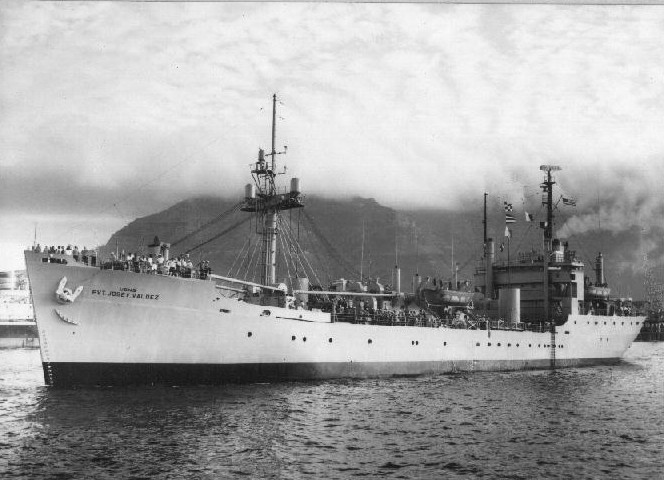
USNS Private Jose F. Valdez

- Valdez was buried with full military honors in the Santa Fe National Cemetery located in Santa Fe, New Mexico.
- USNS Private Jose F. Valdez (T-AG-169), a technical research ship in operation during the 1960s.
- Valdez Elementary School, an elementary School dedicated in north Denver, Colorado.
- PFC Jose F. Valdez Memorial Highway, a 106-mile stretch of U.S. Route 64, from Tierra Amarilla to Bloomfield, in New Mexico.
- Jose F. Valdez U.S. Army Reserve Center, located in Pleasant Grove, Utah, was formerly the headquarters of the 405th Civil Affairs Battalion. The center has been vacant since September 2017, following the unit's relocation to Fort Douglas.
- A memorial to Valdez was dedicated in Gobernador, New Mexico, in 2002.
- A memorial at All Veterans Memorial Park in Berg Park, Farmington, New Mexico, was dedicated in 2009 honoring three northwest New Mexico residents who received the Medal of Honor; Valdez, USMC LCpl. Kenneth Lee Worley, and Army SSG Franklin D. Miller.

== See also ==
- List of Medal of Honor recipients for World War II
- Hispanic Medal of Honor recipients
- Hispanic Americans in World War II
