= Oxford-class research ship =

Class of technical research ships converted from WWII Liberty ships

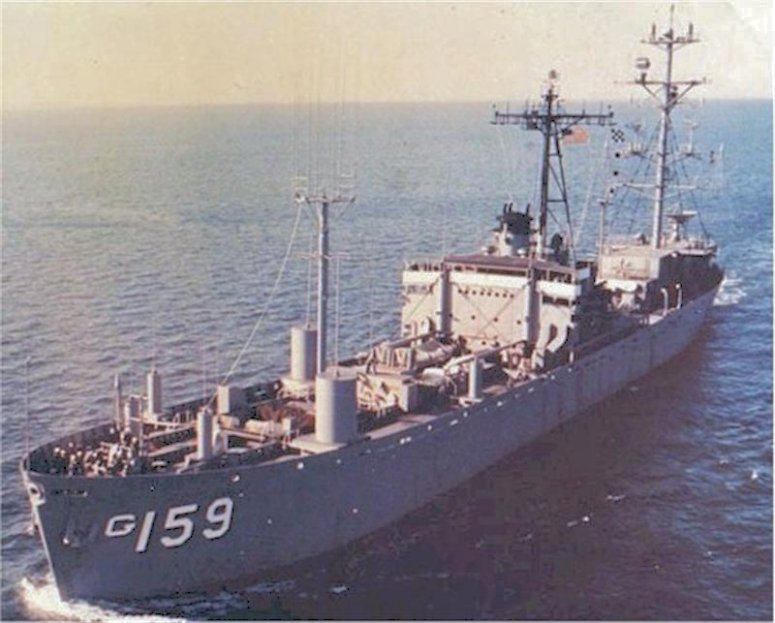
- USS Oxford (AG-159)

Class overview
- Name: Oxford class
- Builders: New England Shipbuilding Corporation
- Operators: United States Navy
- Succeeded by: Belmont class
- Built: 1945
- In commission: 1945–1969
- Completed: 3
- Retired: 3

General characteristics
- Type: Type Z-EC2-S-C5 technical research ship
- Displacement: 8,345 long tons (8,479 t) light; 11,365 long tons (11,547 t) full load
- Length: 441 ft 6 in (134.6 m)
- Beam: 56 ft 11 in (17.3 m)
- Draft: 22 ft 9 in (6.9 m)
- Propulsion: 2 × 220 psi (1,500 kPa) boilers; 1 × 3-cylinder triple-expansion reciprocating engine, 2,500 shp (1,864 kW); 1 × 4-bladed 18 ft 6 in (5.6 m) propeller; 1 shaft
- Speed: 11 knots (20 km/h; 13 mph)
- Complement: 213
- Armament: 4 × .50 caliber machine guns

The Oxford class of technical research ships were a class of three World War II Liberty ships converted in the early 1960s to provide a seaborne platform for global eavesdropping on behalf of the National Security Agency. The ships of this class were similar to the Belmont-class ships of the same era with the difference being that they were adapted from Victory ships.

Oxford was authorized for conversion in 1960 by the New York Naval Shipyard and her two sister ships in 1962 by the Newport News Shipbuiulding & Dry Dock Company. Their stated purpose was to carry out communications and electromagnetic radiation experiments. In 1963 similar conversions of Victory ships were authorized, which became the Belmont-class technical research ships Belmont and Liberty.

== Ships in class ==
- Oxford class (Liberty ship type)
  - USS Oxford (AGTR-1) • 1961–1969
  - USS Georgetown (AGTR-2) • 1963–1969
  - USS Jamestown (AGTR-3) • 1963–1969

== See also ==
- Spy ship
