= Dulaji-class research ship =

Chinese research ship class

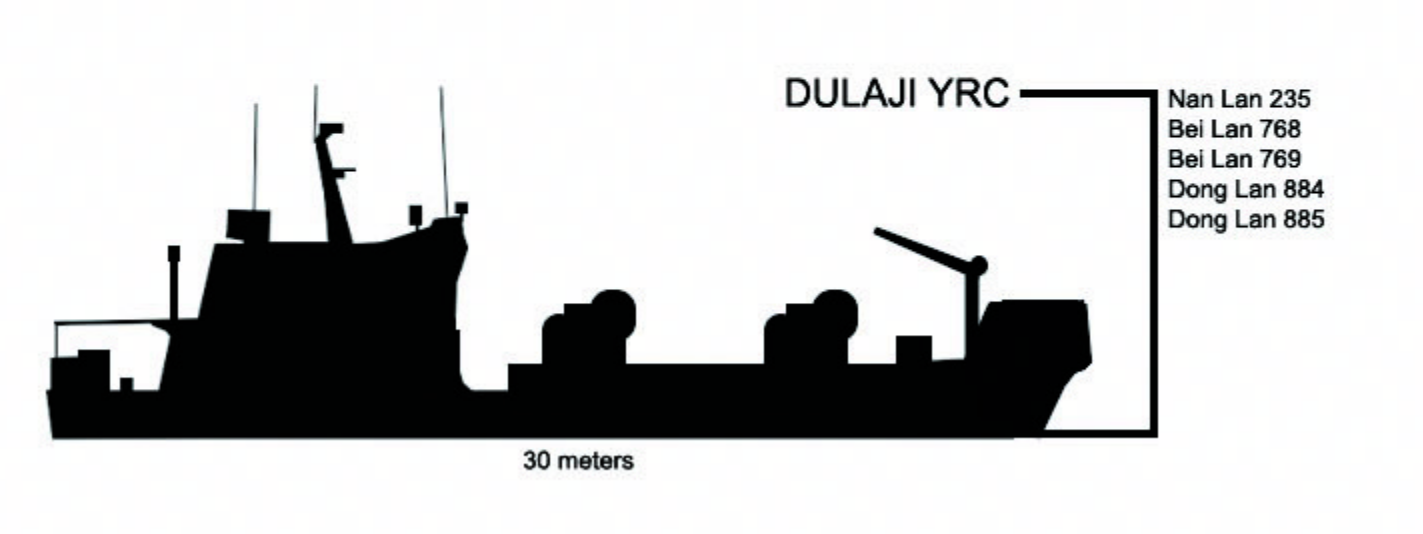
- Dulaji-class research ship

General characteristics
- Class & type: Dulaji class
- Displacement: 300 long tons (300 t)
- Sensors & processing systems: Navigation radar

The Dulaji class are a class of environmental research ships (AGER) currently in service with the People's Liberation Army Navy (PLAN), and the design is also modified for cable layer (YRC) in PLAN service, with both versions have received the same NATO reporting name Dulaji class because they share the same hull. The exact type of this class remain unknown as of 2022, because no official information has been released, despite the ships have already been in service for more than a decade. In addition to the usual task of conducting regular environmental sampling, monitoring/surveillance and research missions, these ships are also tasked with additional task of sewer transfer and treatment from other ships to prevent sewer onboard other ships from overflowing into the sea and thus causing pollution, and thus these ships also act as sewer vessels for vessel sewage discharging.

Ships of this class in PLAN service are designated by a combination of two Chinese characters followed by a two-digit number. For the environmental research version, the second Chinese character is Jian(监), meaning monitor in Chinese, since its primary duties included monitoring environment. For the cable layer version, the second Chinese character is Lan(缆), meaning cable (for communication & power) in Chinese, since its primary duties are laying & maintaining communication and power cables. The first Chinese character denotes which fleet the ship is service with, with East (Dong, 东) for East Sea Fleet (ESF), North (Bei, 北) for North Sea Fleet (NSF), and South (Nan, 南) for South Sea Fleet (SSF). However, the pennant numbers are subject to change due to changes of Chinese naval ships naming convention, or when units are transferred to different fleets. Specification:

- Length: 30 meter
- Displacement: 300 ton

Ships of the environmental research version (AGER):

Type	NATO designation	Pennant No.	Name (English)	Name (Han 中文)	Commissioned	Displacement	Fleet	Status
Dulaji class environmental research ship (AGER)	Dulaji class	Bei-Jian 04	North Monitor 04	北监 04	?	300 t	North Sea Fleet	Active
Dulaji class environmental research ship (AGER)	Dulaji class	Bei-Jian 10	North Monitor 10	北监 10	?	300 t	North Sea Fleet	Active
Dulaji class environmental research ship (AGER)	Dulaji class	Dong-Jian 06	East Monitor 06	东监 06	?	300 t	East Sea Fleet	Active
Dulaji class environmental research ship (AGER)	Dulaji class	Nan-Jian 03	South Monitor 03	南监 03	?	300 t	South Sea Fleet	Active

Ships of the cable layer version (YRC):

Type	NATO designation	Pennant No.	Name (English)	Name (Han 中文)	Commissioned	Displacement	Fleet	Status
Dulaji class cable layer (YRC)	Dulaji class	Bei-Lan 768	North Cable 768	北缆 768	?	300 t	North Sea Fleet	Active
Dulaji class cable layer (YRC)	Dulaji class	Bei-Lan 769	North Cable 769	北缆 769	?	300 t	North Sea Fleet	Active
Dulaji class cable layer (YRC)	Dulaji class	Dong-Lan 884	East Cable 884	东缆 884	?	300 t	East Sea Fleet	Active
Dulaji class cable layer (YRC)	Dulaji class	Dong-Lan 885	East Cable 885	东缆 885	?	300 t	East Sea Fleet	Active
Dulaji class cable layer (YRC)	Dulaji class	Nan-Lan 235	South Cable 235	南缆 235	?	300 t	South Sea Fleet	Active
