= USS Georgetown =

Naval ship used for covert intelligence missions

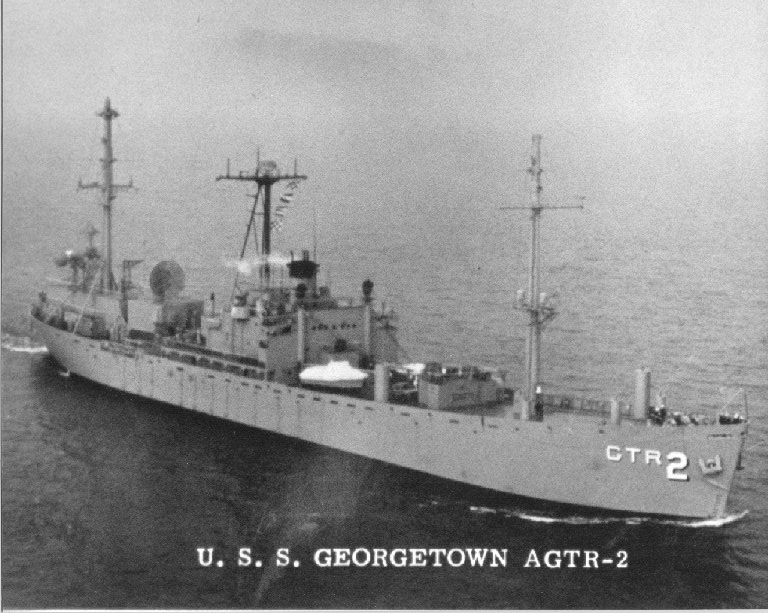
- USS Georgetown (AGTR-2)

History

United States
- Name: Robert W. Hart; Georgetown
- Namesake: Robert W. Hart
- Builder: New England Shipbuilding Corporation
- Laid down: 4 May 1945, as SS Robert W. Hart
- Launched: 10 July 1945
- Sponsored by: Mrs. Fred W. Woolsey
- Acquired: 10 August 1962
- Commissioned: 9 November 1963
- Decommissioned: 19 December 1969
- Renamed: USS Georgetown (AG-165), 6 March 1963
- Reclassified: AGTR-2, 1 April 1964
- Motto: "Progress Through Research"
- Fate: Scrapped, 1971
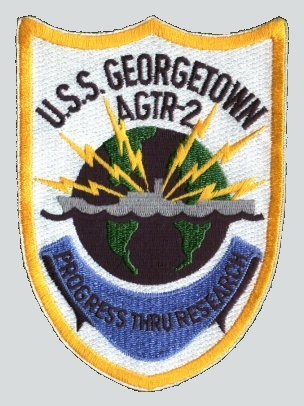
- Badge

General characteristics
- Class & type: Oxford-class technical research ship
- Type: Z-EC2-S-C5
- Displacement: 8,345 long tons (8,479 t) light; 11,365 long tons (11,547 t) full load
- Length: 441 ft 6 in (134.6 m)
- Beam: 56 ft 11 in (17.3 m)
- Draft: 22 ft 9 in (6.9 m)
- Propulsion: 2 × 220 PSI boilers; 1 × 3-cylinder triple-expansion reciprocating engine, 2,500 shp (1,864 kW); 1 × 4-bladed 18 ft 6 in (5.6 m) propeller; 1 shaft
- Speed: 11 knots (20 km/h; 13 mph)
- Complement: 213
- Armament: 4 × 0.5 in (12.7 mm) machine guns

USS Georgetown (AGTR-2/AG-165), was an Oxford-class technical research ship acquired by the U.S. Navy to provide a seaborne platform for global eavesdropping on behalf of the National Security Agency. Her designation as a "technical research" ship was her cover story.

Georgetown was a converted "Liberty-type" cargo ship, was laid down as SS Robert W. Hart under a Maritime Commission contract on 4 May 1945 by New England Shipbuilding Corporation, South Portland, Maine; launched 10 July 1945; sponsored by Mrs. Fred W. Woolsey; and delivered under General Agency Agreement from War Shipping Administration (WSA) to Atlantic, Gulf & West Indies Lines, New York, 2 August 1945.

== Merchant Navy service ==
Robert W. Hart sailed in merchant navy service until entering the National Defense Reserve Fleet, Wilmington, North Carolina, in December 1946. She was chartered by Waterman Steamship Corp., Mobile, Alabama, 31 January 1947 and operated under bareboat charter until 29 October when she entered the National Defense Reserve Fleet, Jamestown, Virginia.

== War Relief and Seacowboys ==
In 1946 after World War II the Robert W. Hart was converted to a livestock ship, also called a cowboy ship. From 1945 to 1947 the United Nations Relief and Rehabilitation Administration and the Brethren Service Committee of the Church of the Brethren sent livestock to war-torn countries. These "seagoing cowboys" made about 360 trips on 73 different ships. The Heifers for Relief project was started by the Church of the Brethren in 1942; in 1953 this became Heifer International. The SS Robert W. Hart was one of these ships, known as cowboy ships, as she moved livestock across the Atlantic Ocean. Robert W. Hart moved horses, heifers, and mules as well as some chicks, rabbits, and goats.

== U.S. Navy service ==
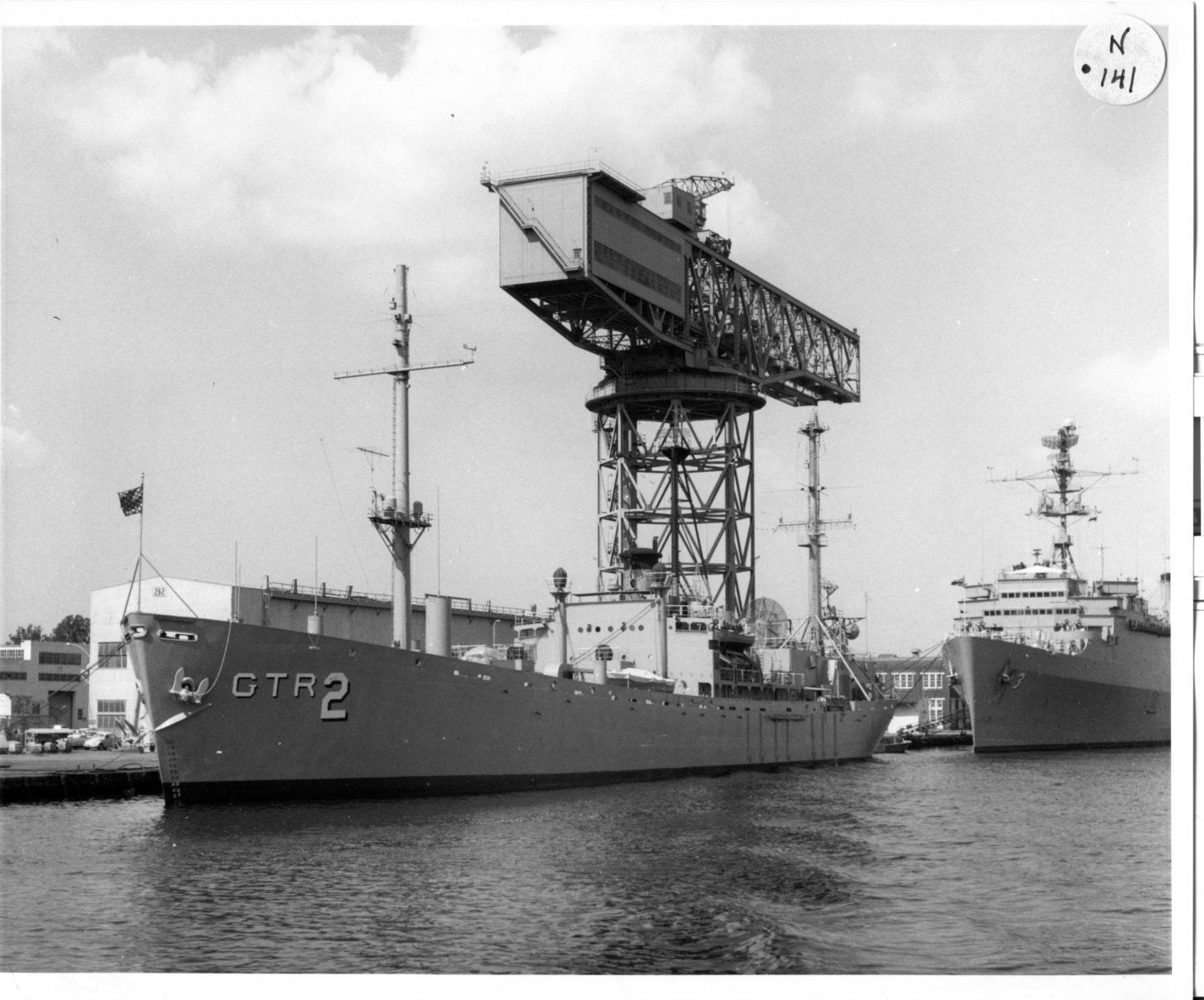
USS Georgetown (AGTR-2) moored pierside under the hammerhead crane at Norfolk Naval Shipyard, Portsmouth, VA. in October 1966

Acquired by the Navy on 10 August 1962, she was taken to Newport News Shipbuilding & Dry Dock Co., Newport News, Virginia, for conversion to a ship capable of accommodating a vast array of electronic gear and a crew of over 250—most of whom held security clearances that allowed them to work in the spy ship's nerve center. She was renamed USS Georgetown (AG-165) on 6 March 1963 and commissioned at Norfolk, Virginia, 9 November 1963.

=== Atlantic Ocean operations ===
Equipped with the latest electronic listening devices, Georgetown sailed for shakedown at Guantanamo Bay, Cuba, on 21 January 1964. She was reclassified AGTR-2 on 1 April 1964 and began her operational service on 13 April. Assigned to Service Squadron 8, she operated in the Caribbean until June, then departed Norfolk, Virginia on 30 June on a four-month deployment along the eastern coast of South America. After completing her intelligence-gathering activities, she returned to Norfolk on 26 October.

=== Pacific Ocean operations ===
Departing Norfolk on 5 January 1965, Georgetown steamed via the Panama Canal to the Southeast Pacific Ocean for operations off the coast of Chile.

=== From ocean to ocean ===
Before returning to Norfolk on 14 May, she also operated in the Caribbean. Between 20 July and 13 October she again operated off the eastern coast of South America; and, after returning to Norfolk, she received new electronics equipment, including a Communication Moon Relay System that allowed her to instantly transmit her findings to NSA headquarters in Fort Meade, Maryland. She departed Norfolk on 14 December and resumed operations in the Caribbean—including weeks of eavesdropping in international waters near Havana, Cuba—and the equatorial Pacific. The year was a busy one for Georgetown. Besides gathering communications intelligence, she rescued two boatloads of Cuban refugees, transited the Panama Canal four times, passed through the eye of a hurricane, and won the Battle Efficiency "E."

She was sold to the Dutch firm of N. V. Intershitra for $185,001 on 24 July 1970 and scrapped about a year later.

== Awards and decorations ==

National Defense Service Medal

== See also ==
- Technical research ship
