= Technical Research Ship Special COMMunications =

TRSSCOMM (Technical Research Ship Special COMMunications), an early U.S. Navy earth-moon-earth satellite communication system that relayed ("bounced") messages directly from intelligence-gathering ship to Washington DC by bouncing a microwave signal off the moon, used first on the USS Oxford (15 December 1961). This system consisted of a 16-foot, dish-shaped antenna mounted on a movable platform and capable of bouncing a 10,000 watt microwave signal off a particular spot on the moon and down either to the receiving station at the National Security Agency, Fort Meade, Maryland, or to one of the other Navy SIGINT ships. TRSSCOMM had the advantage of being able to transmit large quantities of intelligence information very rapidly without giving away the ship's location to hostile direction-finding equipment or interfering with incoming signals. Its major disadvantage is that it could only work if the moon was visible and the shipboard hydraulic stabilization system worked properly. This system was replaced by creation of a network of artificial military satellites.
