= USS Jamestown (AGTR-3) =

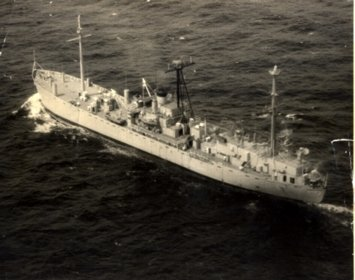

History

United States
- Name: J. Howland Gardner; Jamestown
- Namesake: J. Howland Gardner; Jamestown, Virginia, is the earliest permanent settlement established by Englishmen in North America
- Ordered: as J. Howland Gardner; Z–EC2–S–C5 MCE–3126
- Builder: New England Shipbuilding Corporation
- Laid down: 4 May 1945
- Launched: 10 July 1945
- Acquired: 10 August 1962
- Commissioned: 13 December 1962
- Decommissioned: 19 December 1969
- Stricken: 14 January 1970
- Home port: Norfolk, Virginia
- Motto: "In Relquum Tempus"
- Fate: Scrapped, May 1970
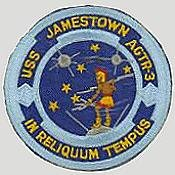
- Badge

General characteristics
- Displacement: 11,365 (f.)
- Length: 441 ft (134 m)
- Beam: 59 ft (18 m)
- Draught: 22 ft (6.7 m)
- Speed: 11 knots
- Complement: 313

USS Jamestown (AGTR-3/AG-166) was an Oxford-class technical research ship (a Cold War spy ship) acquired by the U.S. Navy for the task of "conducting research in the reception of electromagnetic propagations" (SIGINT).

== Jamestown's civilian life ==
The third ship to be named Jamestown by the Navy, AG-166, a converted Liberty ship, was launched as J. Howland Gardner under Maritime Commission contract by New England Shipbuilding Corp., South Portland, Maine, 10 July 1945; and sponsored by Mrs. George W. Elkins of Newport, Rhode Island.

The Liberty ship was completed on 14 August 1945, and chartered under general agency agreement by Waterman Steamship Co. until 17 June 1946, when she went into the Maritime Reserve Fleet. She was chartered by United States Navigation Company, 3 February 1947, and by South Atlantic Steamship Lines, 20 October 1948.

== Acquired by the Navy as a technical research ship ==
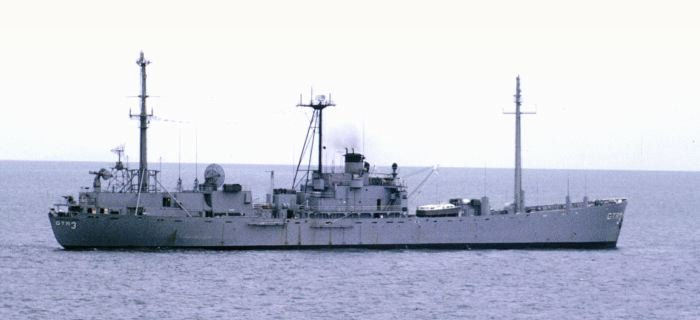
USS Jamestown (AGTR-3) under way off AnThoi, Phu Quoc Island, Vietnam, date unknown.

J. Howland Gardner returned to Maritime Reserve Fleet at Beaumont, Texas. She was acquired there by the Navy 10 August 1962: renamed Jamestown and designated AG-166 on 6 March 1963; and commissioned 13 December at Norfolk Navy Yard.

The technical research ship was assigned to Service Squadron 8, Service Force, Atlantic Fleet, with Norfolk, Virginia, her home port. Her mission is "to conduct technical research operations in support of U.S. Navy electronic research projects, which include electromagnetic propagation studies and advanced communications systems such as satellite communications."

In actuality, from 1965 both the Jamestown and the USS Oxford (AGTR-1) had begun to undertake Signals Intelligence tasks in the waters off South Vietnam following a United States Intelligence Board decision in April, 1965. The Oxford arriving in May, 1965 and the Jamestown in December. Until they were decommissioned in December, 1969, these ships continued to act in that capacity, supplementing land based radio-intelligence monitoring of North and South Vietnamese and Cambodian VHF and HF communication nets. It can be extrapolated that communications from Thailand, Laos and China were also monitored where possible. This information was recently released under the Freedom of Information Act in the previously Top Secret NSA book "Cryptologic History Series, Southeast Asia, Focus on Cambodia", January 1974 at Part One, page 59.

== Preparing to evacuate personnel at Guantanamo ==
After fitting out at Norfolk, Jamestown departed 20 January 1964 for Guantanamo Bay, Cuba, where she underwent 2 weeks of intensive shakedown training. She was there when Cuban Fidel Castro shut off all fresh water to that base, and stood by ready to evacuate American families. Upon completion of shakedown training, she made brief visits to Kingston, Jamaica, and Key West, Florida, before returning to Norfolk 27 February.

== Exercising her "sea legs" ==
Jamestown was redesignated AGTR-3 on 1 April and 8 days later departed on her first deployment visiting Gibraltar; Valletta, Malta; Aden; Cape Town; and Freetown, Sierra Leone, before returning Norfolk 17 August. The ensuing weeks were devoted to preparation for deployment off the African coast. She stood out of Norfolk 2 November for Dakar, Senegal, Cape Town, South Africa, and further service acquiring new knowledge in the vital field of electronic communications. Jamestown then returned to Norfolk 6 February 1965. After operation in the Caribbean in the spring, she transited the Panama Canal for a cruise along the Pacific Coast of South America reaching Valparaíso, Chile, 9 June. She celebrated the Fourth of July at Callao. Peru, and then transited the Panama Canal, returning to Norfolk 23 July.

== Vietnam operations ==
Exactly 3 months later Jamestown got underway for the Far East and reached Subic Bay in the Philippines 29 December. She operated in the South China Sea gathering valuable information for the Navy's ships fighting to protect the independence of South Vietnam while adding to the long Navy tradition of serving the field of scientific research. She continued operating in the Far East, often operating in the Vietnam war zone, through mid-1967.

Jamestown was decommissioned 19 December 1969 and scrapped in May 1970.

== Awards and decorations ==

| Meritorious Unit Commendation | | National Defense Service Medal |
| Vietnam Service Medal with nine service stars | Vietnam Gallantry Cross unit citation(9) | Vietnam Campaign Medal |

The USS Jamestown was awarded a Meritorious Unit Commendation along with the USS Oxford (AGTR-1). The citation reads (in part):

"For meritorious service from 1 November 1965 to 30 June 1969 while participating in combat support operations in Southeast Asia. Through research and the compilation of extremely valuable technical data, USS Jamestown and USS Oxford contributed most significantly to the overall security of the United States and other Free World forces operating in support of the Republic of Vietnam. Signed E.R. Zumwalt, Admiral, USN, Chief of Naval Operations"
