= USNS Sgt. Joseph E. Muller =

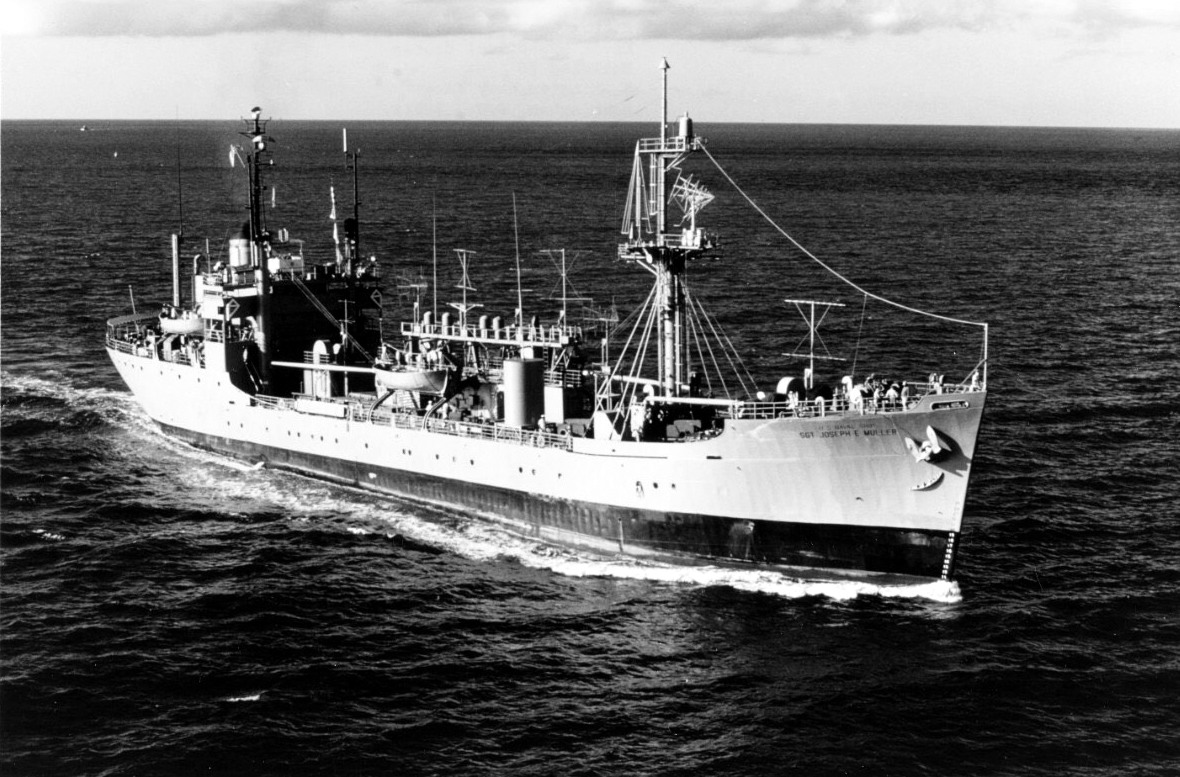
- Sgt Joseph E. Muller underway off Key West, 19 August 1968

History

United States
- Name: Check Knot (1944); Sgt. Joseph E. Muller (1948)
- Namesake: Joseph E. Muller, who was awarded the Medal of Honor
- Builder: Southeastern Shipbuilding Corporation, Savannah, Georgia
- Laid down: December 1944, as M/V Check Knot, type (C1-M-AV1) hull, MC hull 2485
- Launched: 17 February 1945
- Sponsored by: Mrs. D. R. Williams
- In service: Check Knot (1945–46); USAT Sgt Joseph E. Muller (1948–50); USNS Sgt. Joseph E. Muller (1950–57, 1962–69)
- Out of service: 1969
- Refit: as a Miscellaneous auxiliary (technical research ship) at Maryland Shipbuilding and Dry Dock Company, Baltimore, Maryland, in October 1962
- Stricken: 25 October 1957 and on 16 September 1969
- Identification: U.S. Official Number: 247488
- Fate: Transferred to MARAD, 13 November 1969; sold on 3 October 1972

General characteristics
- Type: C1-M-AV1
- Tonnage: 3,805 GRT
- Displacement: 6,090 tons
- Length: 338 feet 9 inches (103.3 m)
- Beam: 50 feet 4 inches (15.3 m)
- Draft: 21 feet (6.4 m)
- Propulsion: diesel, single propeller
- Speed: 11.5 knots
- Troops: 101
- Complement: 107 officers and enlisted
- Armament: none

USNS Sgt. Joseph E. Muller was a C1-M-AV1 cargo ship completed 9 June 1945 and delivered to the War Shipping Administration (WSA) as Check Knot. After operation by WSA's agent Waterman Steamship Company June 1945 – November 1946 and being placed in reserve the ship was transferred to the U.S. Army and renamed USAT Sgt. Joseph E. Muller. She was transferred to the United States Navy in 1950 after the establishment of the Military Sea Transportation Service under Navy and assigned to Korean War supply and transport operations. She was again place back in service in 1962 as one of the civilian crewed, Auxiliary General (AG), technical research ships working on National Security Agency/Naval Security Group missions, based out of Florida. She was finally declared surplus to needs in 1969 and struck.

== Construction and delivery ==
Sgt. Joseph E. Muller was laid down under U.S. Maritime Commission contract (MC hull 2485) as Check Knot on 30 December 1944 by the Southeastern Shipbuilding Corporation, Savannah, Georgia and launched on 17 February 1945 sponsored by Mrs. D. R. Williams. The ship was completed and delivered to the War Shipping Administration on 9 June 1945 for operation by the Waterman Steamship Company as its agent. Check Knot was placed in the Suisun Bay Reserve Fleet on 4 November 1946.

== World War II-related U.S. Army service ==
Title was transferred to the U.S. War Department on 30 June 1948 for operation by the Army Transportation Service with the ship being renamed Sgt. Joseph E. Mutter. USAT Sgt. Joseph E. Mutter was operated in support of occupation forces in Japan and Korea.

== Korean War service with the Navy ==
In late 1949, the Navy-operated Military Sea Transportation Service (now Military Sealift Command) was established; and, in July 1950, the ship was transferred to that organization and classified as the small coastal transport (APC), USNS Sgt. Joseph E. Mutter (T-APC-118). Through the Korean War, she continued to shuttle passengers and cargo—primarily to Japan and Korea, but with an occasional run to Okinawa, Taiwan, and the Philippines.

During the Korean War, Sgt. Joseph E. Muller operated during the following campaigns: (Note: DANFS makes no such mention as Navy does not typically award "battle stars" to non-combatant, civilian-crewed MSTS/MSC ships.)

- North Korean Aggression – 8 July to 38 October 1950
- Communist China Aggression – 13 December 1950 to 24 January 1951
- First UN Counter Offensive – 25 January to 12 April 1951
- Communist China Spring Offensive – 26 April to 8 July 1951
- UN Summer-Fall Offensive – 15 July to 27 November 1951
- Second Korean Winter – 28 November 1951 to 8 April 1952
- Korean Defense Summer-Fall 1952 – 16 July to 29 November 1952
- Third Korean Winter – 1 December 1952 to 27 April 1953
- Korean Summer-Fall 1953 – 1 May to 20 July 1952

In the spring of 1955, she sailed east, arriving in Hawaii for repairs in mid-May, and at New York City in late June for operations out of that port. Initially slated for Arctic resupply missions, she was transferred temporarily and in ready status to the Maritime Administration's National Defense Reserve Fleet (NDRF), Hudson River berthing area, on 7 December 1956, and, in September 1957, was declared surplus to the needs of the Navy. The following month, she was returned to the Navy and, on 25 October, was permanently transferred to the NDRF and laid up with the Hudson River unit.

== Reactivated as a signals intelligence ship ==
Just under five years later, in August 1962, Sgt. Joseph E. Muller was designated for activation, conversion to a research support ship, a cover for signals intelligence operations, and redelivery to the Navy on 20 September 1962. On 1 October, reactivation and conversion was begun at the Maryland Shipbuilding and Dry Dock Company, Baltimore, Maryland; on 30 October, she was reinstated on the Navy List as the miscellaneous auxiliary (AG), USNS Sgt. Joseph E. Muller (T-AG-171). A week later, the ship was towed to New Orleans, Louisiana, for further alterations. In April 1963, she arrived at Port Everglades, Florida, where she took up duties as one of three Military Sea Transportation Service operated technical research ships classed as Miscellaneous Auxiliary (AG), designated at the time simply "special project ships," for National Security Agency/Naval Security Group operating out of Port Everglades to the Caribbean under the general cover of oceanographic or atmospheric research operations.

== Final inactivation ==
On 16 September 1969, the ship was again declared surplus; and, on 13 November, she was transferred back to the NDRF for berthing in the James River. Her name was struck from the Navy List on the same date. The ship was sold to Union Minerals and Alloys Corporation on 3 October 1972 with delivery for non transportation use on 7 December 1972.
