= Gobernador, New Mexico =

Unincorporated community in New Mexico, US

Coordinates: 36°42′9″N 107°23′32″W

Gobernador is a small, unincorporated community located in Rio Arriba County, New Mexico. Although not on a Native American reservation, Gobernador is about 50 miles east of the Navajo Nation and 15 miles west of the Jicarilla Apache Indian Reservation. Carson National Forest also lies about five miles to the east. The community is situated near the junction of U.S. Route 64 and New Mexico State Road 527. The nearest towns are Aztec, New Mexico, Dulce, New Mexico, and Arboles, Colorado. Gobernador lies in between the dry, arid land of northwest New Mexico and the forested, mountainous land of north central New Mexico, with sandy soil, smaller trees and other plants, and shorter mountains and mesas.
