= Bennwihr station =

Railway station in Bennwihr, France

Coordinates: 48°7′50.06″N 7°21′22.37″E

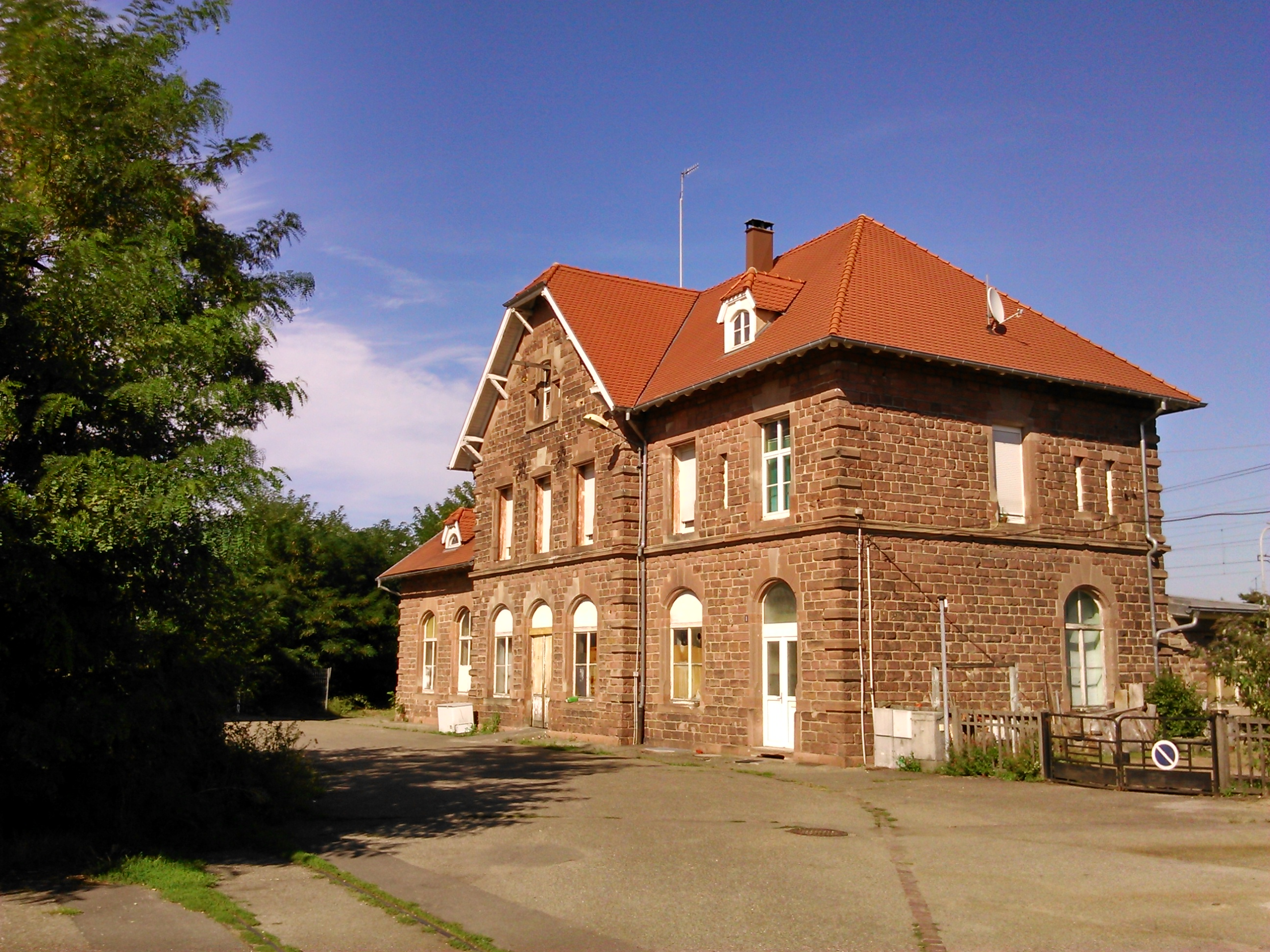
Station building in 2015.

Gare de Bennwihr is a former railway station in Bennwihr in the department of Haut-Rhin, region Grand Est in eastern France. It was on the rail line from Strasbourg to Colmar.
