= Technical research ship =

Type of intelligence-gathering ship

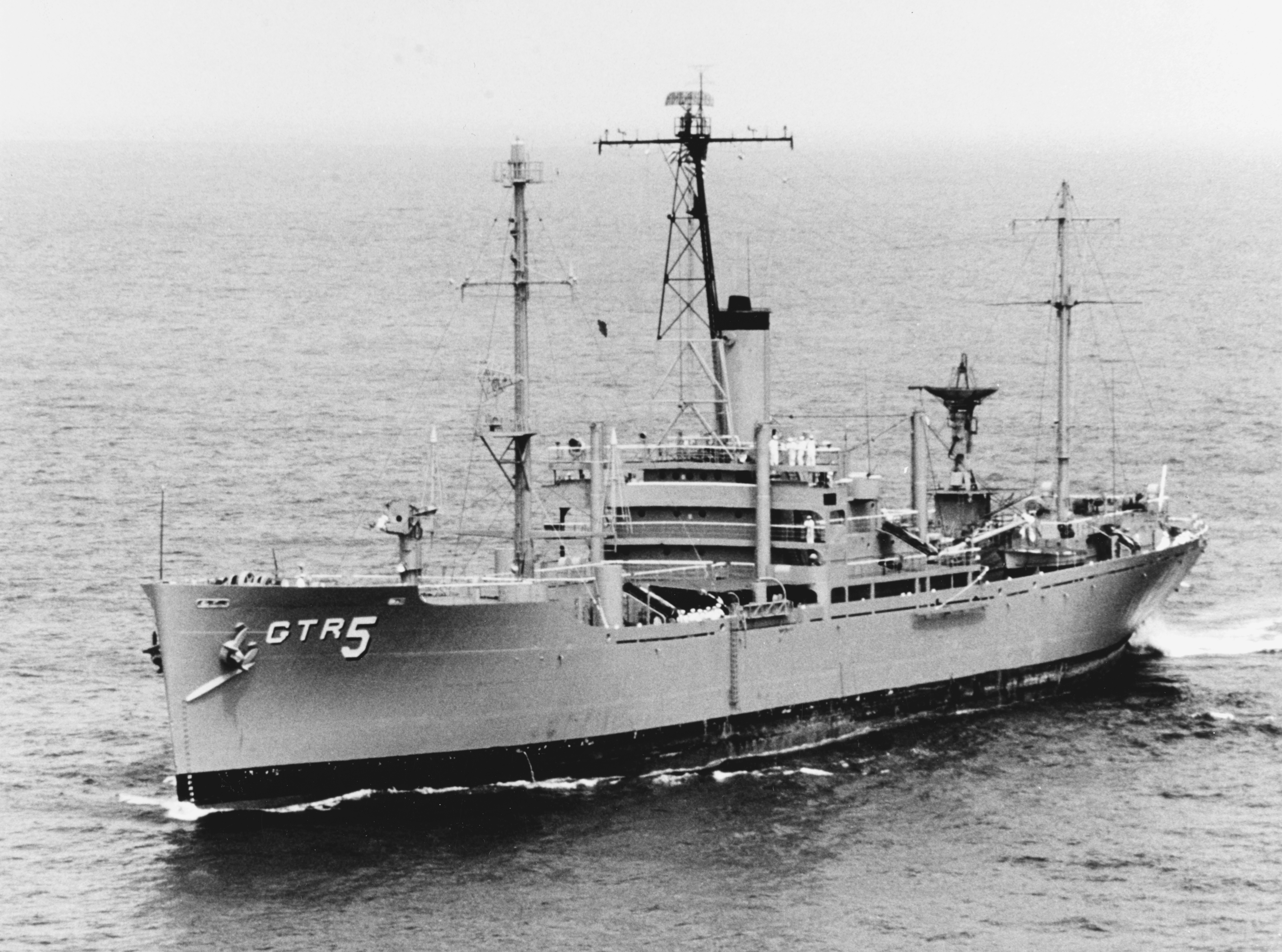
USS Liberty spy ship

Technical research ships were used by the United States Navy during the 1960s to gather intelligence by monitoring, recording and analyzing Wireless electronic communications of nations in various parts of the world. At the time these ships were active, the mission of the ships was covert and discussion of the true mission was prohibited ("classified information"). The mission of the ships was publicly given as conducting research into atmospheric and communications phenomena. Their designation was AGTR – Auxiliary, General, Technical Research – but it was more or less an open secret that this was a euphemism and they were commonly referred to as "spy ships".

== Function ==
These ships carried a crew of U.S. Navy personnel whose specialty was intercepting wireless electronic communications and gathering intelligence from those communications (signals intelligence, communications intelligence, and electronic signals intelligence (SIGINT)). In the 1960s those personnel had a U.S. Navy rating of Communications Technician (later changed to Cryptologic Technician), or CT.

In order to transmit intelligence information that had been gathered back to United States for further processing and analysis, these ships had a special system named Technical Research Ship Special Communications, or TRSSCOM (pronounced tress-com). This Earth-Moon-Earth (EME) communications system used a special gyroscope-stabilized 16-foot (4.9 m) parabolic antenna, which can be seen aft of the main superstructure in the accompanying photographs of Belmont and Liberty. Radio signals were transmitted toward the Moon, where they would bounce back toward the Earth and be received by a large 84-foot (26 m) parabolic antenna at a Naval Communications Station in Cheltenham, Maryland (near Washington, D.C.) or Wahiawa, Hawaii. Communications could occur only when the Moon was visible simultaneously at the ship's location and in Cheltenham or Wahiawa. The gyro stabilization of the antenna kept the antenna pointed at the Moon while the ship rolled and pitched on the surface of the ocean.

These ships were classified as naval auxiliaries with a hull designation of AGTR, which stands for Auxiliary, General, Technical Research. Five of these ships were built with hull numbers of 1–5. The first three ships of this type (Oxford, Georgetown, and Jamestown) were converted from World War II-era Liberty ships. The last two ships (Belmont and Liberty) were converted from Victory ships. The former Liberty ships' top speed of 11 knots (20 km/h; 13 mph) limited the first three AGTRs to missions of slow steaming on station with a minimum of transits. Victory ships' sustained speed of 18 knots (33 km/h; 21 mph) enabled Belmont to shadow Mediterranean Sea operations of the Soviet helicopter carrier Moskva in 1969. All of the technical research ships were decommissioned and stricken by 1970.

One of these ships' crew received a Presidential Unit Citation for heroism in combat. USS Liberty was attacked, severely damaged and 34 crew members killed by shelling, napalm bombing and torpedoing from Israeli jet fighter aircraft and motor torpedo boats on June 8, 1967.

USS Jamestown was awarded a Meritorious Unit Commendation along with USS Oxford. The citation reads (in part) "For meritorious service from 1 November 1965 to 30 June 1969 while participating in combat support operations in Southeast Asia. Through research and the compilation of extremely valuable technical data, USS Jamestown and USS Oxford contributed most significantly to the overall security of the United States and other Free World forces operating in support of the Republic of Vietnam. Signed E.R. Zumwalt, Admiral, USN, Chief of Naval Operations."

For specifications of these ships, see Liberty ship and Victory ship.

== Ships of the AGTR type ==
(dates of commissioning–decommissioning)

- Oxford class (Liberty ship type)
  - USS Oxford • 1961–1969
  - USS Georgetown • 1963–1969
  - USS Jamestown • 1963–1969
- Belmont class (Victory ship type)
  - USS Belmont • 1964–1970
  - USS Liberty • 1964–1968

== Environmental research ship (AGER) ==
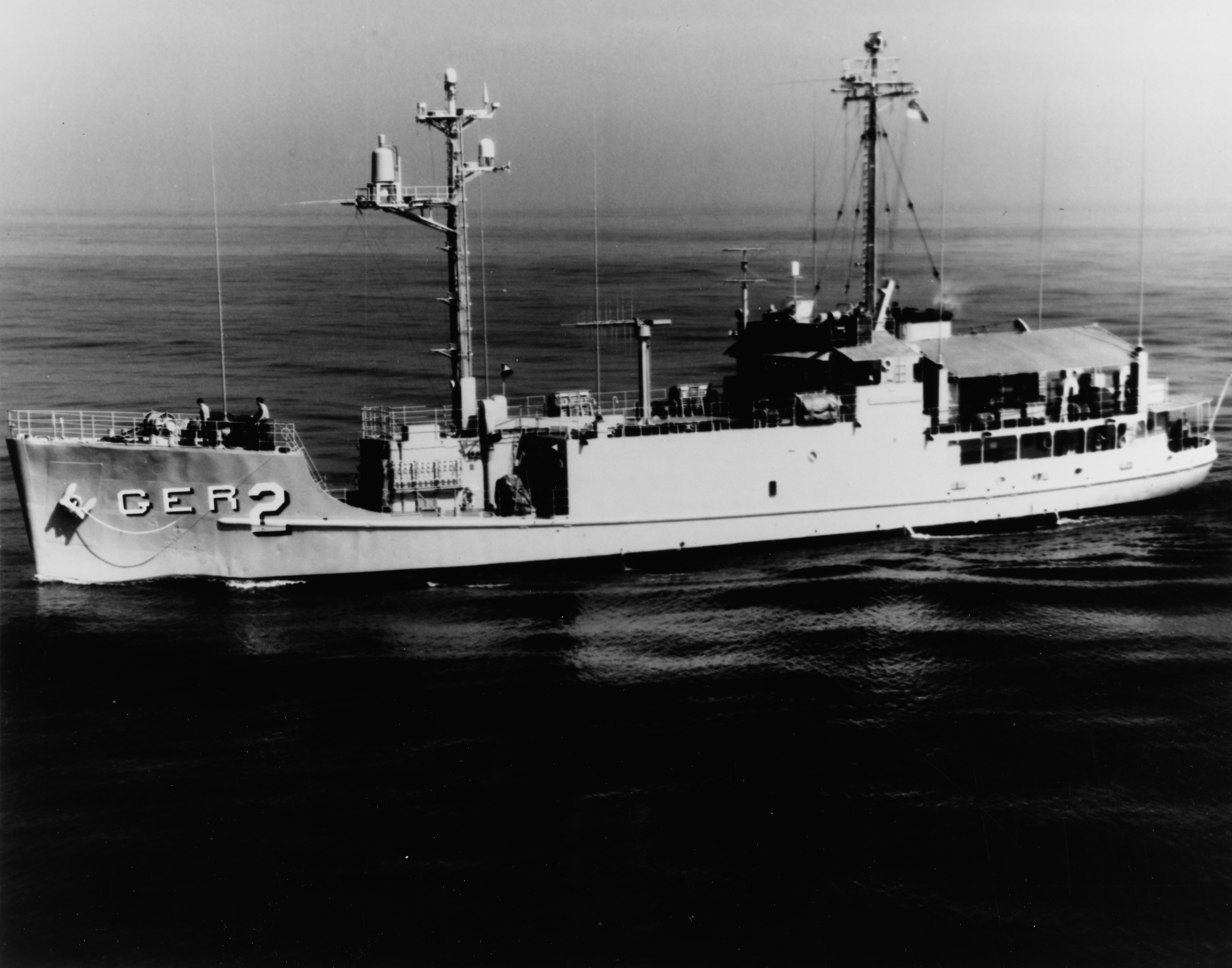
USS Pueblo

Three smaller ships, former Army Freight Supply (FS) ships converted by Navy to Light Cargo Ship (AKL) vessels and then to Banner-class environmental research ships (AGER) had a similar mission. In contrast to the high freeboard of the AGTR Liberty and Victory hulls, the AGER decks were low and vulnerable to boarding from small craft. USS Pueblo, technically still in commission, has been held by North Korea since its attack and capture by on January 23, 1968.

=== Ships of the AGER type ===
- USS Banner (redesignated from AKL-25/T-AKL-25, ex Army FS-345)
- USS Pueblo (redesignated from AKL-44, ex Army FS-344)
- USS Palm Beach (redesignated from AKL-45, ex U.S. Army FS-217)

== Auxiliary General (AG) USNS ships ==
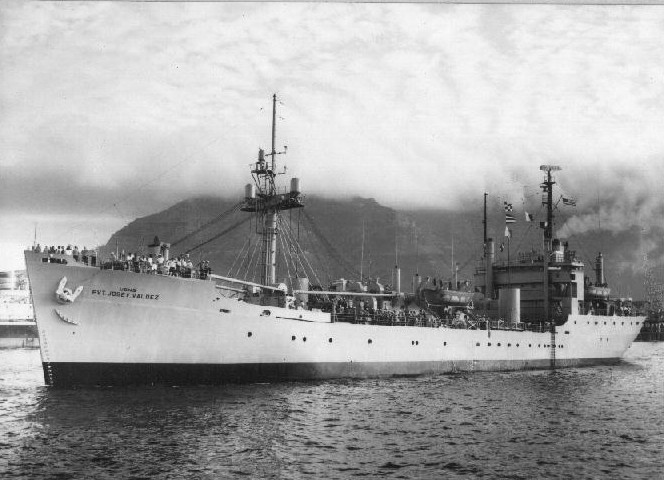
USNS Private Jose F. Valdez

Three technical research ships were operated as USNS ships with a Military Sea Transportation Service civilian crew and a Navy detachment conducting the mission operations. Two ships were Maritime Commission C1-M-AV1 types. One, USNS LT. James E. Robinson, was a VC2-S-AP2 (Victory) type that operated in this role December 1962-April 1964 before being reclassified AK‑274 and resuming cargo operations.

- USNS Private Jose F. Valdez (Maritime Commission C1-M-AV1 type)
- USNS LT. James E. Robinson (Maritime Commission VC2-S-AP2 (Victory) type)
- USNS Sgt. Joseph E. Muller (Maritime Commission C1-M-AV1 type)

== See also ==
- Spy ship
- USS Parche (SSN-683) and USS Jimmy Carter (SSN-23), nuclear submarines modified or designed for intelligence gathering.
- USS Sphinx, modified for electronic surveillance in El Salvador and Nicaragua area (1985–1987).
- List of research vessels – United States
- Naval trawler
