= USS Oxford (AGTR-1) =

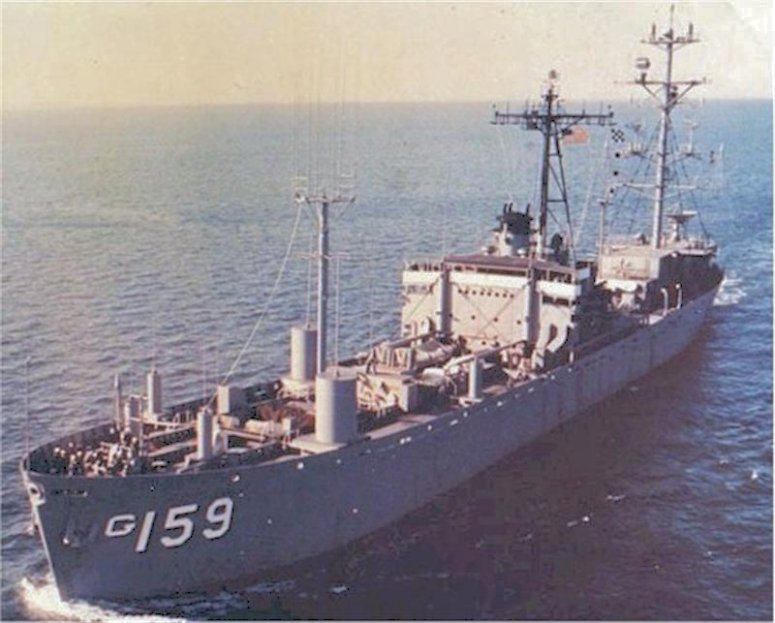

History

United States
- Name: USS Oxford
- Namesake: American towns, cities, and counties named Oxford
- Ordered: as Z–EC2–S–C5; MCE–3127
- Builder: New England Shipbuilding Corporation
- Laid down: 23 June 1945
- Launched: 31 July 1945 as; Samuel R. Aitken
- Commissioned: 8 July 1961
- Decommissioned: 19 December 1969
- Stricken: 14 January 1970
- Motto: "Strength Freedom Security"
- Fate: Scrapped, June 1970
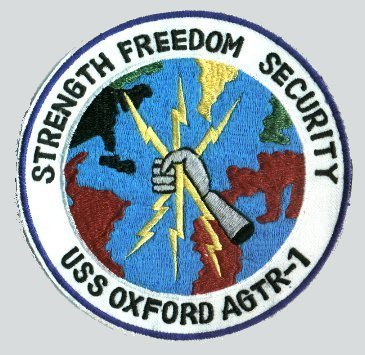
- Badge

General characteristics
- Displacement: 11,365 (f.)
- Length: 441 ft (134 m)
- Beam: 59 ft (18 m)
- Draft: 22 ft (6.7 m)
- Propulsion: 2 × 220 PSI boilers; 1 × 3-cylinder triple-expansion reciprocating engine, 2,500 shp (1,864 kW); 1 × 4-bladed 18 ft 6 in (5.6 m) propeller; 1 shaft
- Speed: 11 knots (20 km/h)
- Complement: 254

USS Oxford (AGTR-1/AG-159) was an Oxford-class technical research ship (a class of US spy ships of the early Cold War), acquired by the U.S. Navy in 1960 and converted for the task of conducting "research in the reception of electromagnetic propagations" (electronic signals intelligence gathering). She was originally built during World War II as a Liberty-type cargo ship originally named the Samuel R. Aitken.

== Samuel R. Aitken's civilian life ==
The second ship eventually to be named Oxford by the Navy, AGTR-1, a Liberty ship, was laid down 23 June 1945 under Maritime Commission contract by the New England Shipbuilding Corp. of Portland, Maine as a merchant marine naval cargo ship; launched 31 July 1945 as Samuel R. Aitken (MCE–3127); sponsored by Mrs. Margaret C. Aitken; and delivered to the Maritime Commission 25 August 1945.

As Samuel R. Aitken she served the merchant fleet, first with the Moore-McCormack Steam Ship Lines and then with the Arnold Bernstein Line. She was laid up 10 April 1948 in the National Defense Reserve Fleet, in Wilmington, North Carolina.

== Conversion to technical research ship Oxford AG-159 ==
In October 1960, the Samuel R. Aitken was towed to the New York Naval Shipyard, Brooklyn, New York, for conversion to an electronic spy ship. Renamed USS Oxford (AG–159) on 25 November 1960, she was commissioned at New York on 8 July 1961. She reported to Norfolk, Virginia, 11 September 1961 for duty with the Service Force, Atlantic Fleet, and shortly thereafter conducted shakedown out of Guantanamo Bay, Cuba.

Oxford was designed to conduct research in the reception of electromagnetic propagations, an open secret phrase for gathering electronic signals military intelligence (SIGINT). Equipped with the latest antenna systems and measuring devices, she was a highly sophisticated and mobile station which could steam to various parts of the world to participate in the Navy's "comprehensive program of research and development projects in communications" (electronic spying). Because of the immediate or potential military applications of her work, much of Oxford's employment was classified.

== Cold War Service ==
=== Cuban Missile Crisis ===
In the fall of 1962, the Oxford had been making slow figure-eight patterns in the waters just off the coast of Havana, Cuba. Its mission had been to eavesdrop on Cuban microwave communications throughout the island. The workings of the microwave system in Cuba were well known to the Americans since they had acquired the design documents from the Radio Corporation of America which had installed the system during the Batista era. The Oxford had been able to listen in on the Cuban secret police, the Cuban navy, air defences, and civil aviation. On 15 September 1962, radar technicians on board the Oxford were able to detect the presence of Soviet P-12 radar known to NATO as "Spoon Rest". This suggested that the Soviets had secretly upgraded the target tracking and acquisition systems in Cuba. On 27 October 1962, "Black Saturday", the Oxford discovered a breakthrough in the Soviet defenses on the island when it detected radar signals from SAM missile sites near Mariel. This discovery would soon alter both low flying RF-8 Crusader and RF-101 Voodoo photo missions and high altitude U-2 spy plane reconnaissance flights over the island.

=== A "first" in moon bounce communications ===
One of Oxford's publicized operations took place 15 December 1961 when she became the first ship to receive a message from a shore based facility via the moon successfully. Next she departed Norfolk, Virginia, 4 January 1962 for a South Atlantic Ocean deployment, returning four months later. Another four month South Atlantic deployment followed in May 1963, after which Oxford underwent overhaul at Norfolk Naval Shipyard, Portsmouth, Virginia.

January 1964 brought refresher training at Guantanamo Bay, and from 22 February until 10 June 1964 Oxford conducted further "research operations" in South Atlantic and Pacific Ocean waters.

== Redesignated AGTR-1 ==
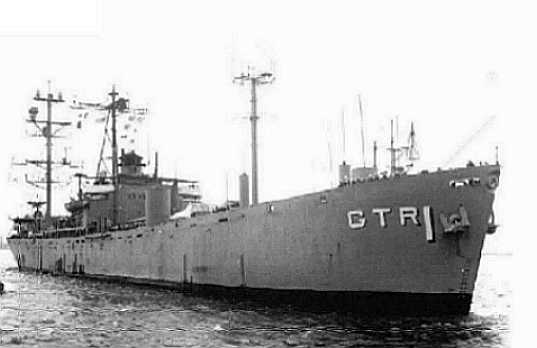
USS Oxford (AGTR-1)

Oxford (AG-159) was redesignated technical research ship (AGTR–1) on 1 April 1964. She departed 4 August on yet another South Atlantic cruise, conducting research not only in electromagnetic reception, but also in oceanography and related areas. She returned to Norfolk 1 December.

Oxford steamed for Africa 3 February 1965, calling at Las Palmas, Canary Islands, Lagos, Nigeria, and Durban, South Africa. A message arrived 26 May reassigning the ship to the U.S. Pacific Fleet, with a new homeport at San Diego, California. She stood out of Subic Bay, Philippine Islands, 16 June for a one-month deployment to the South China Sea, and thus set the pattern for her operations into 1969.

=== Decommissioning ===
Oxford decommissioned and was struck from the Naval Vessel Register 19 December 1969 at Yokosuka, Japan.

== Awards and decorations ==

| Meritorious Unit Commendation | National Defense Service Medal | Armed Forces Expeditionary Medal |
| Vietnam Service Medal with ten service stars | Vietnam Gallantry Cross unit citation | Vietnam Campaign Medal |

The USS Oxford was awarded a Meritorious Unit Commendation along with the USS Jamestown (AGTR-3). The citation reads (in part):

For meritorious service from 1 November 1965 to 30 June 1969 while participating in combat support operations in Southeast Asia. Through research and the compilation of extremely valuable technical data, USS Jamestown and USS Oxford contributed most significantly to the overall security of the United States and other Free World forces operating in support of the Republic of Vietnam. Signed E.R. Zumwalt, Admiral, USN, Chief of Naval Operations

== See also ==
- Technical research ship
