= USS Liberty =

Belmont-class electronic spying ship

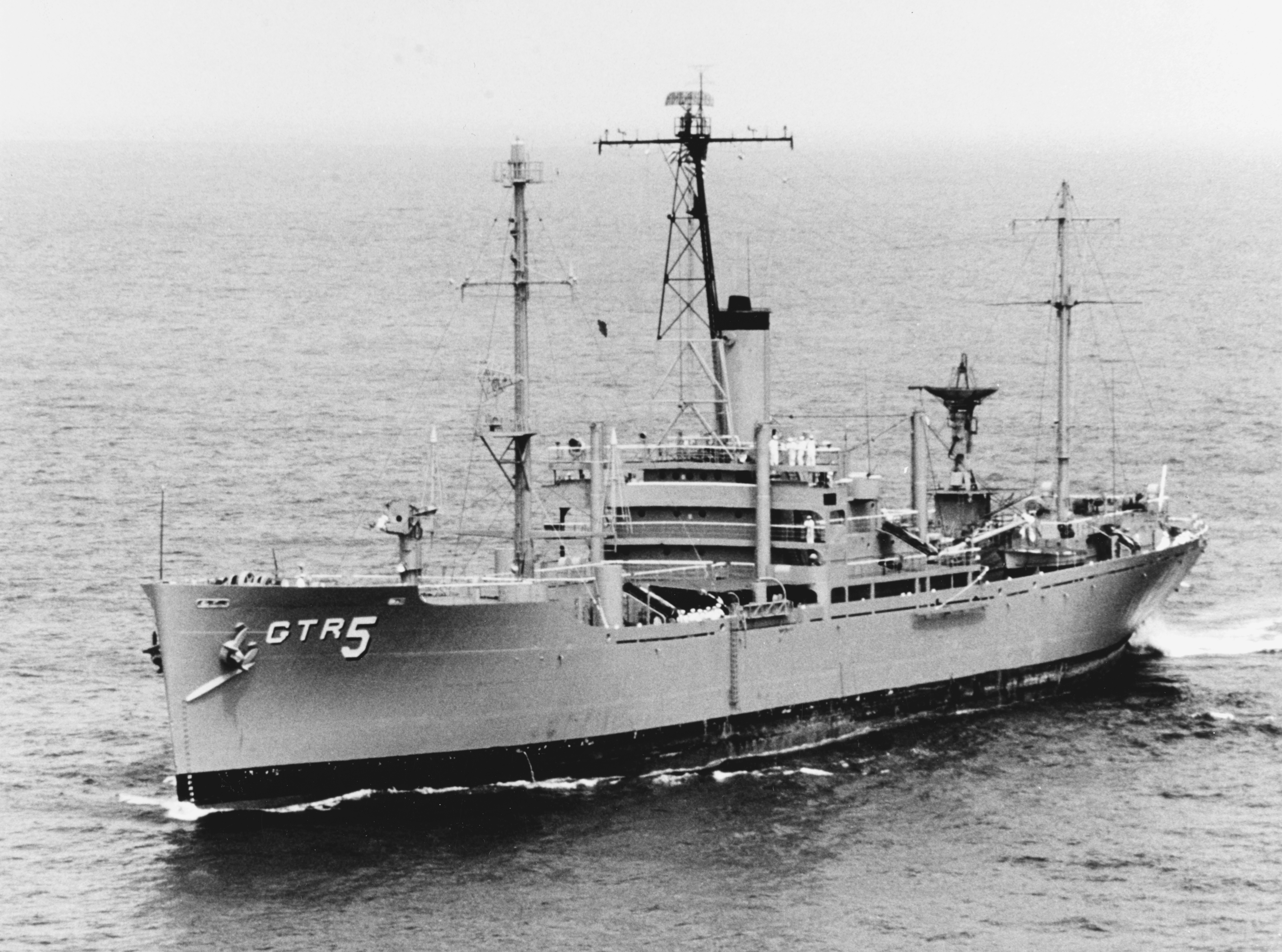
- USS Liberty sailing in the Chesapeake Bay on 29 July 1967

History

United States
- Name: SS Simmons Victory
- Namesake: Simmons College in Boston
- Owner: War Shipping Administration
- Operator: Coastwise - Pacific Far East Line (during WWII only)
- Builder: Oregon Shipbuilding Corp.
- Laid down: 23 February 1945
- Launched: 6 April 1945
- Completed: 4 May 1945
- Renamed: 8 June 1963
- Identification: Callsign: AGTR 5
- Fate: Transferred to US Navy in 1963

United States
- Name: USS Liberty
- Namesake: Localities named "Liberty" in ten US states
- Acquired: 25 March 1963
- Commissioned: 30 December 1964
- Decommissioned: 1 June 1968
- Out of service: June 1967
- Stricken: 1 June 1970
- Home port: Norfolk, Virginia
- Fate: Damaged beyond economical repair by Israeli attack in June 1967; sold for scrap in 1973
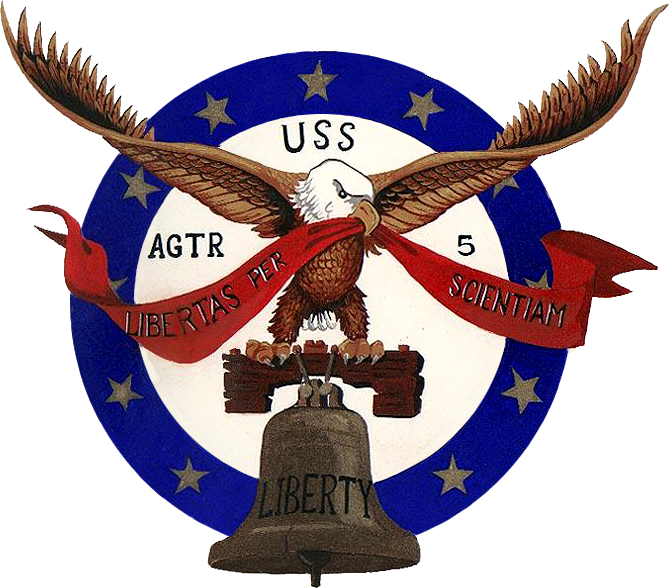
- Badge

General characteristics
- Displacement: 7725 tons (light displacement)
- Length: 139 m (456 ft)
- Beam: 18.9 m (62 ft)
- Draft: 7 m (23 ft)
- Propulsion: Westinghouse steam turbines, single shaft, 8500 horsepower (6.3 MW)
- Speed: 17.5 knots (32.4 km/h) maximum sustained, 21 knots emergency
- Range: 12,500 nmi (23,200 km; 14,400 mi) at 12 knots (22 km/h; 14 mph)
- Complement: 62 Merchant Marine and 28 US Naval Armed Guards as Victory ship; 358 officers and enlisted for USS Liberty
- Armament: 1 × 5 in (127 mm)/38 cal. gun as Victory ship; 1 × 3 in (76 mm)/50 cal. gun; 8 × 20 mm Oerlikon; 4 x M2 Browning .50 caliber machine gun as USS Liberty

USS Liberty (AGTR-5) was a Belmont-class technical research ship (an electronic spying ship) that is notable for coming under attack from the Israel Defense Forces during the 1967 Six-Day War. She was originally built and served in World War II as a VC2-S-AP3 type Victory cargo ship named SS Simmons Victory. Her keel was laid down on 23 February 1945 at Oregon Shipbuilding Corporation of Portland, Oregon.

In 1967, Israeli air force and naval units attacked the research ship during the Six-Day War. Israel later apologized for the attack, stating it had mistaken Liberty for an Egyptian ship, although the reason for the attack has been disputed. Liberty would eventually be decommissioned sometime after the attack and was sold for scrapping in 1973 as she had been damaged beyond feasible repair.

== Service history ==
=== Construction ===
Her keel was laid down on 23 February 1945, under a Maritime Commission contract at Oregon Shipbuilding Corporation of Portland, Oregon. She entered service as a VC2-S-AP3 type Victory cargo ship named SS Simmons Victory, named after Simmons College in Boston, Massachusetts.

=== Early years ===
The ship was delivered to the War Shipping Administration on 4 May 1945. The next day, she was transferred to the "Coastwise -Pacific Far East Line" and designated as a "Fleet Issue Ship". Her complement included a 17-man Navy Armed Guard detachment to operate the ship's gun battery; a three- or four-man communication liaison detachment; and 16 Navy sailors serving as "winchmen and hatchmen".

Simmons Victory was tasked with delivering ammunition, which was loaded at the San Francisco-Suisun Bay area navy munitions depot at Port Chicago for Operation Downfall, the planned invasion of Japan. According to Harry Morgan, who served as an engineer on the ship, Simmons Victory arrived in the Philippines about six weeks before V-E Day on 8 May 1945. (Note: Morgan says the Simmons Victory took on ammunition just two weeks before the disastrous explosion at Port Chicago on 17 July 1944, an event that occurred months before the ship was launched.) She made one trip north in support of Operation Downfall and returned to the Philippines. (Note: According to Morgan, the ship "had been equipped to supply the Sixth Fleet when they made the invasion into Japan." However, the US Sixth Fleet was based in the Mediterranean during World War II. The Sixth Army and the Seventh Fleet were based in the west Pacific area and both were tasked to participate in Operation Downfall.) She was in Leyte Gulf when Japan surrendered on 15 August 1945.

Simmons Victory departed Leyte Gulf on 6 October 1945, en route to the US West Coast via Eniwetok, and dumped ammunition at sea two days later. (Note: Morgan says, after the war, Simmons Victory unloaded its cargo of ammunition in Port Chicago. The official Navy account by Cressman seems to indicate that the cargo was dumped at sea: "With a cargo of ammunition, Simmons Victory cleared Leyte Gulf on 6 October 1945, and as part of the preparation for the disarming the vessel, the armed guard dumped the ammo at sea on 8 October." Possibly, only the ammo on deck for the ship's gun battery was dumped at sea and the ammo carried as cargo was returned to Port Chicago.) She arrived in San Francisco on 3 November 1945 and departed for the US east coast on 9 December 1945, reaching New York on Christmas Day, 1945. (Note: Morgan says, after leaving Port Chicago, she took supplies to Baltimore through the Panama Canal.) Her 5-inch, 3-inch, and 20-mm guns were removed there on 9 January 1946.

From December 1946 until 1963, the ship moved back and forth several times from commercial charters as a break bulk cargo carrier to stints in the National Defense Reserve Fleet (being twice berthed in the Hudson River). Most notably during this time, she made nine trips to the Far East between November 1950 and December 1952 during the Korean War "to equip American troops fighting communist North Korea" in the Military Sea Transportation Service. On 11 June 1958, Simmons Victory once again entered the National Defense Reserve Fleet, being berthed this time at Olympia, Washington, where she remained until 1963.

=== US Navy years ===
In February 1963, the US Navy acquired Simmons Victory and converted her to a "Miscellaneous Auxiliary" ship at Willamette Iron and Steel of Portland. On 8 June, the vessel was renamed USS Liberty and given the hull classification symbol AG-168. On 1 April 1964, she was reclassified a Technical Research Ship, and given the radio call sign AGTR-5. She was commissioned at Puget Sound Naval Shipyard in Bremerton, Washington, in December 1964.

In February 1965, Liberty steamed from the West Coast to Norfolk, Virginia, where she was further outfitted (cost: US$20 million) to suit her for a mission of supporting the National Security Agency (NSA) by collecting and processing foreign communications and other electronic emissions of possible national defense interests. In June, Liberty began her first deployment to the waters off the west coast of Africa. She carried out several more operations during the next two years, and sailed to the Mediterranean Sea in 1967. During the Six-Day War between Israel and several Arab nations, she was sent to collect electronic intelligence in the eastern Mediterranean.

==== Israeli attack ====
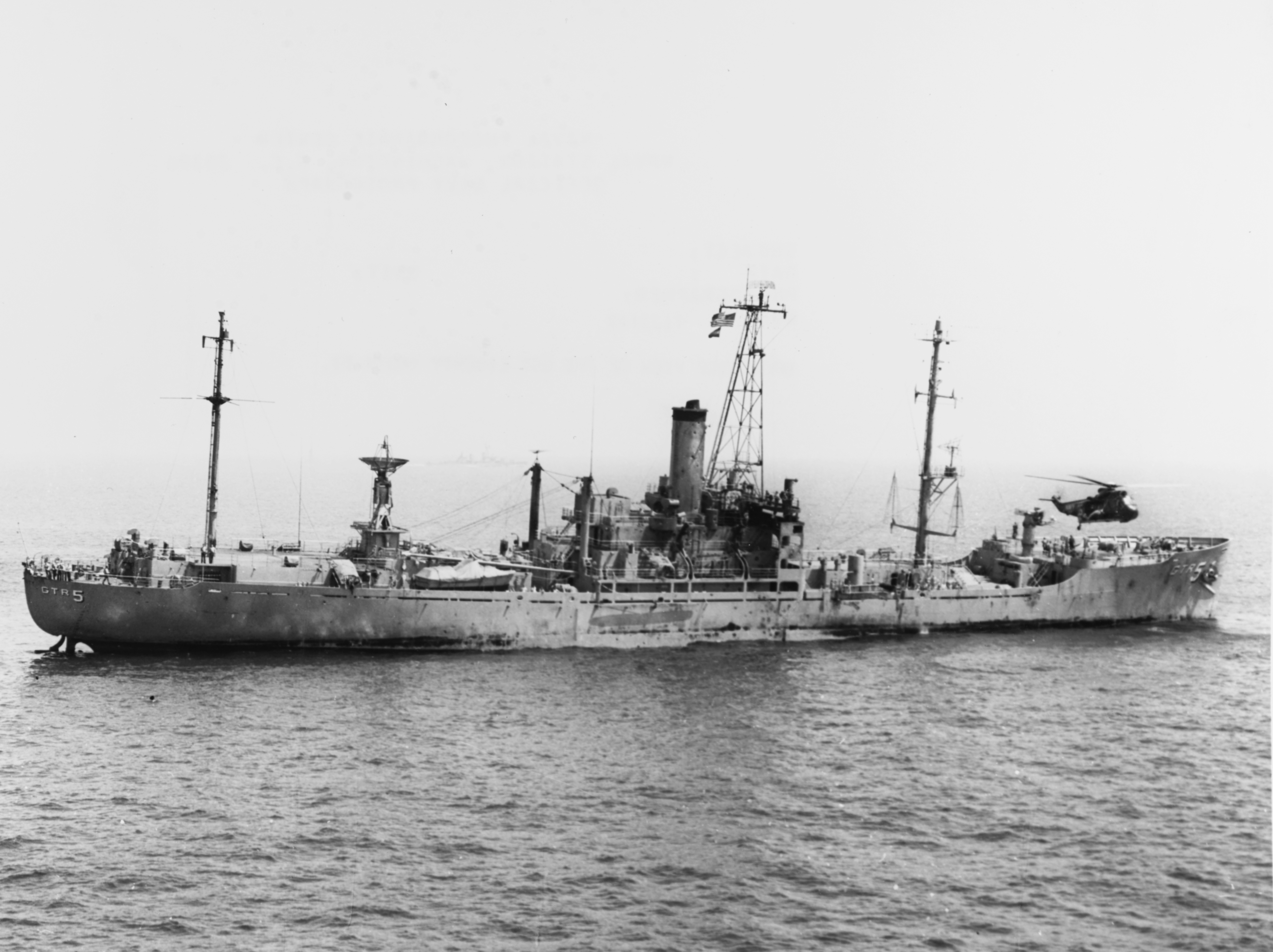
USS Liberty being assisted by Sixth Fleet SH-3 after being attacked by Israeli forces on 8 June 1967

On the afternoon of 8 June 1967, while in international waters off the northern coast of the Sinai Peninsula, Liberty was attacked and damaged by aircraft of the Israeli Air Force and motor torpedo boats of the Israeli Navy; 34 American crewmen were killed and 174 were wounded. Though Liberty was severely damaged, with a 39-by-24-foot (11.9 m × 7.3 m) hole amidships and a twisted keel, her crew kept her afloat, and she was able to leave the area under her own power. Later, Israel apologized for the attack, stating it had mistaken Liberty for an Egyptian ship, as the incident occurred during the Six-Day War. In total, Israel gave close to $13 million (about $128 million in 2026) to the U.S. in compensation for the incident.

After the attack, she was escorted to Valletta, Malta, by units of the Sixth Fleet and given temporary repairs. After the repairs were completed, Liberty returned to the United States on 27 July 1967. She was decommissioned and stricken from the Naval Vessel Register on 28 June 1968. She was laid up in the Atlantic Reserve Fleet of Norfolk until December 1970, when she was transferred to the Maritime Administration for disposal. In 1973, she was sold for scrapping to the Boston Metals Company of Baltimore, Maryland.

===== Debate =====
Some accounts, notably from former U.S. ambassador to Lebanon Dwight Porter, allege that NSA or CIA intercepts recorded an Israeli pilot identifying the ship as American and receiving orders from ground control to attack regardless.

Although this claim is frequently cited in discussions of the USS Liberty incident, no official documents or transcripts have been produced to verify it. In an interview with A. Jay Cristol, Dwight Porter did not explicitly retract the allegation but acknowledged the absence of supporting evidence.

US Foreign Service Officer Richard B. Baker, editor of The Middle East Journal, attested to Miller's accounts as "reflecting the majority view among my former colleagues in the foreign affairs establishment" with regards to the attack on Liberty being a deliberate one, but also noted that Miller's perspective suffered from an unreasonable portrayal of the Israeli military as infallible. Norman Polmar expressed doubt in the aerial attack on Liberty being deliberate by citing the lack of sufficient armaments on the initial Israeli aircraft sent to attack the unidentified ship, stating the use of napalm indicated a hasty rather than deliberate attack on the ship. Conversely, Polmar detailed a blatant miscalculation of the speed of Liberty and the refusal of the Israeli Navy to identify the ship before firing at it. In Clark Clifford's report on the Liberty attack to the President's foreign intelligence advisory board, he concluded that while the attack consisted of gross negligence on the part of the Israeli military for which they should be held responsible, there was no substantive evidence of a deliberate plot circulated by the highest echelons of the Israeli government to attack Liberty intentionally.

== Awards, decorations and Memorabilia ==
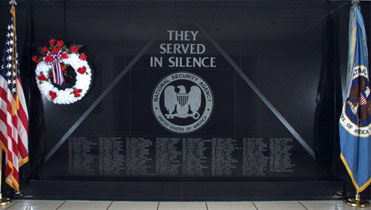
NSA National Cryptologic Memorial. Many of the names are from 8 June 1967

As a result of the crew's heroic response to the Israeli attack, Liberty is the US Navy's "most highly decorated ship ... for a single action". For the action with Israeli forces, she was awarded the Combat Action Ribbon (8–9 June 1967) and the Presidential Unit Citation (8 June 1967). Although President Lyndon B. Johnson signed the Presidential Unit Citation in 1968, it was not formally presented to the crew until June 1991. President George H. W. Bush declined to attend the 1991 White House ceremony, instead merely waving at the crew while passing by.

Commander (later Captain) William McGonagle, Liberty's commanding officer, received the Medal of Honor. Numerous members of the crew were decorated, including 11 members of the crew who were awarded Silver Stars, 20 with Bronze Stars, and over 200 who received Purple Hearts. The unidentified remains of six of Liberty's crew are buried under a single headstone in a mass grave in Arlington National Cemetery.

Liberty was also awarded the National Defense Service Medal.

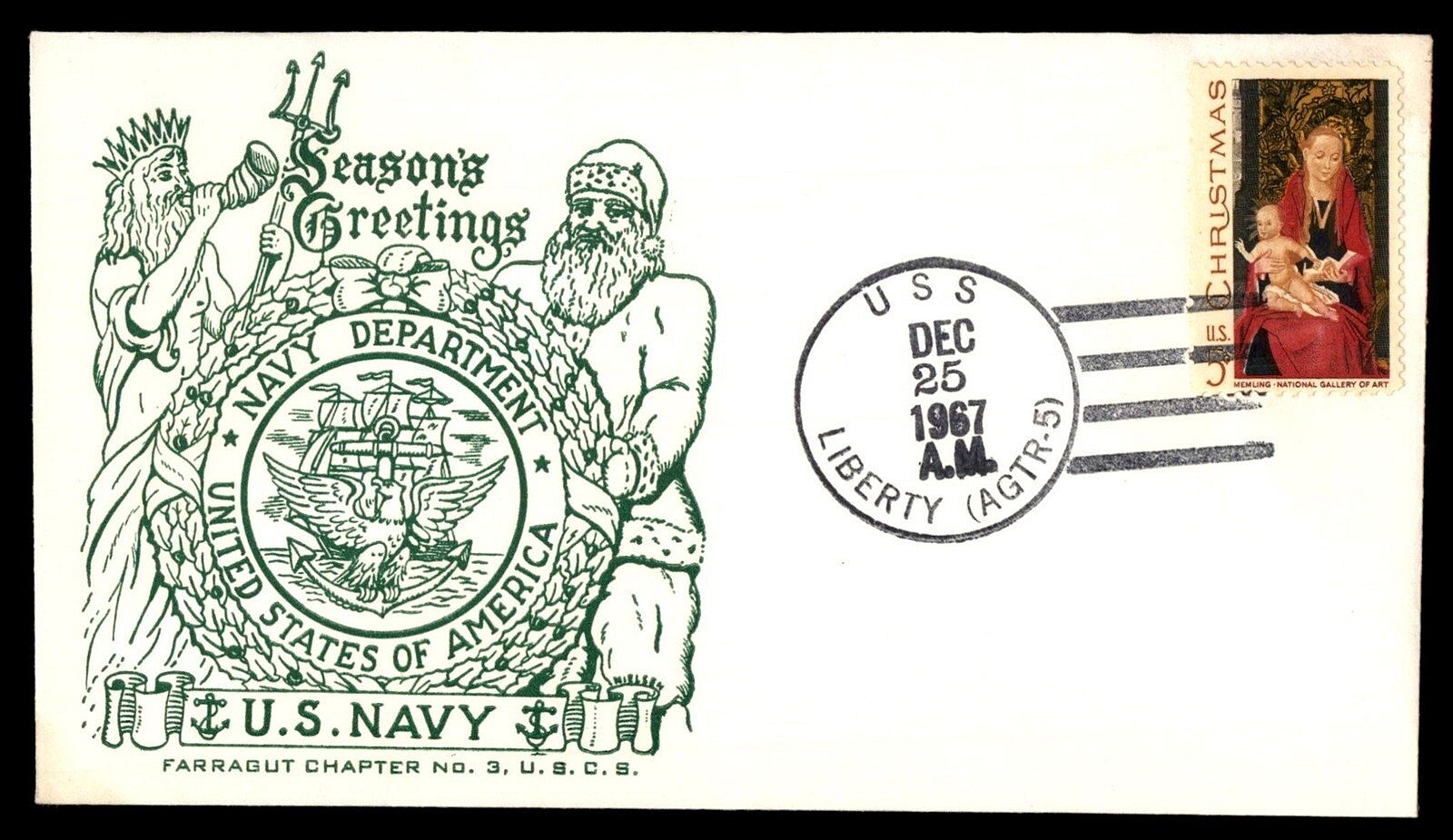
Postmark and Cachet of USS Liberty

== See also ==
- List of maritime disasters in the 20th century
- USS Belmont (AGTR-4), the other ship in her conversion class
- Technical research ship
- Spy ship
- USS Liberty incident
- List of Victory ships
