= New England Shipbuilding Corporation =

Coordinates: 43°39′3″N 70°14′4″W

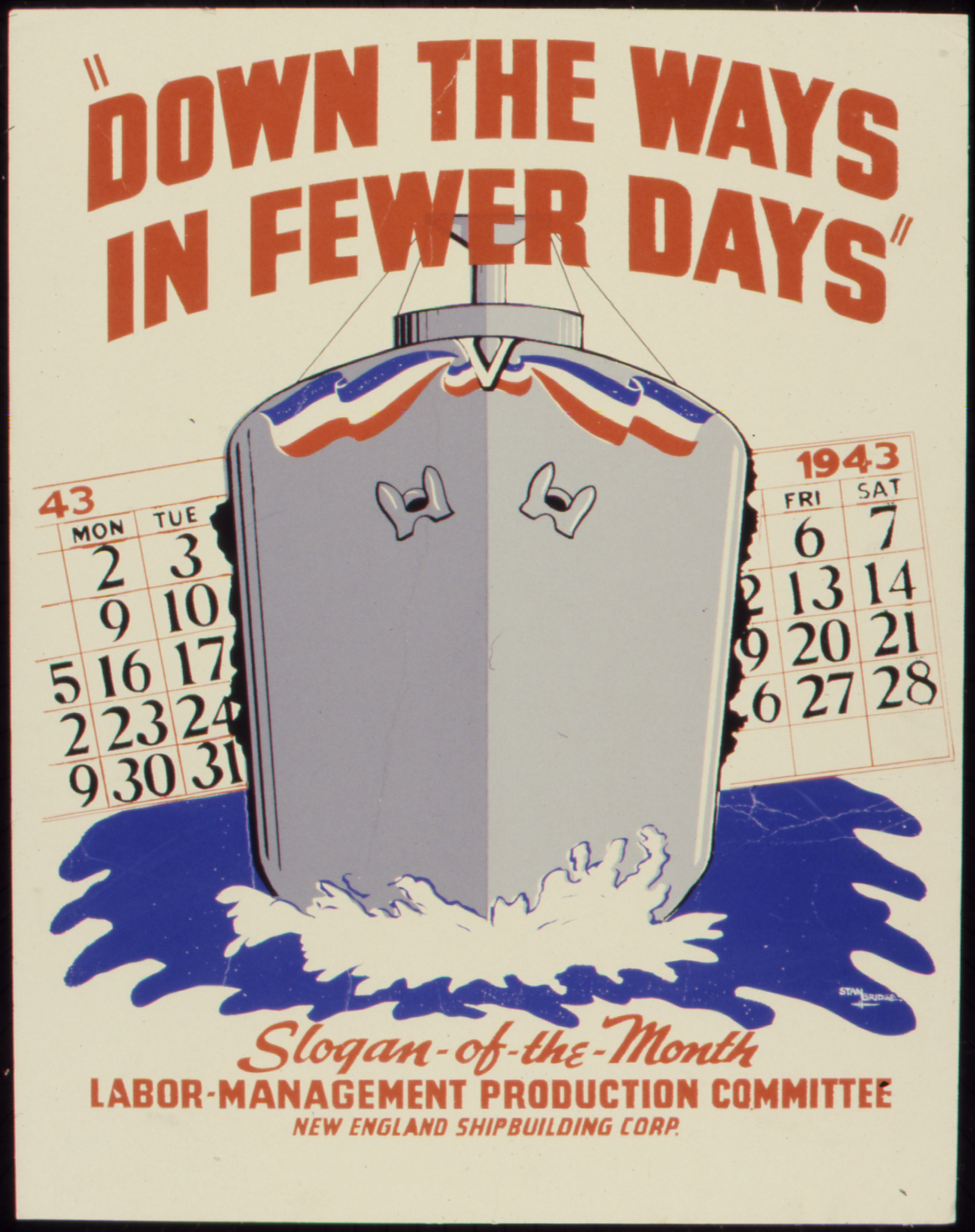
"Down the ways in fewer days", WWII poster from the New England Shipbuilding Corporation

The New England Shipbuilding Corporation was a shipyard located in the city of South Portland, Maine, United States. The yard originated as two separate entities, the Todd-Bath Iron Shipbuilding Corporation (a joint operation of Todd Shipyards and Bath Iron Works) and the South Portland Shipbuilding Corporation, which were created in 1940 and 1941 respectively, in order to meet the demand created by World War II. The two merged in 1943, then continued to produce ships as the New England Shipbuilding Corporation's East Yard and West Yard. New England Shipbuilding ranked 97th among United States corporations in the value of World War II military production contracts. Both closed at the end of the war.

The two yards built 266 ships: 154 in the East Yard, 112 in the West Yard. The first 30 East Yard ships were Ocean class cargo ships built for the United Kingdom. The remaining ships were of the Liberty ship design, derived from the Ocean class, and were built for the United States Maritime Commission. Among them was the SS Jeremiah O'Brien, a Liberty ship that is preserved as a museum ship in San Francisco. In contrast to many museum vessels, she is in seaworthy condition in compliance with U.S. Coast Guard and American Bureau of Shipping standards, making regular cruises on San Francisco Bay.

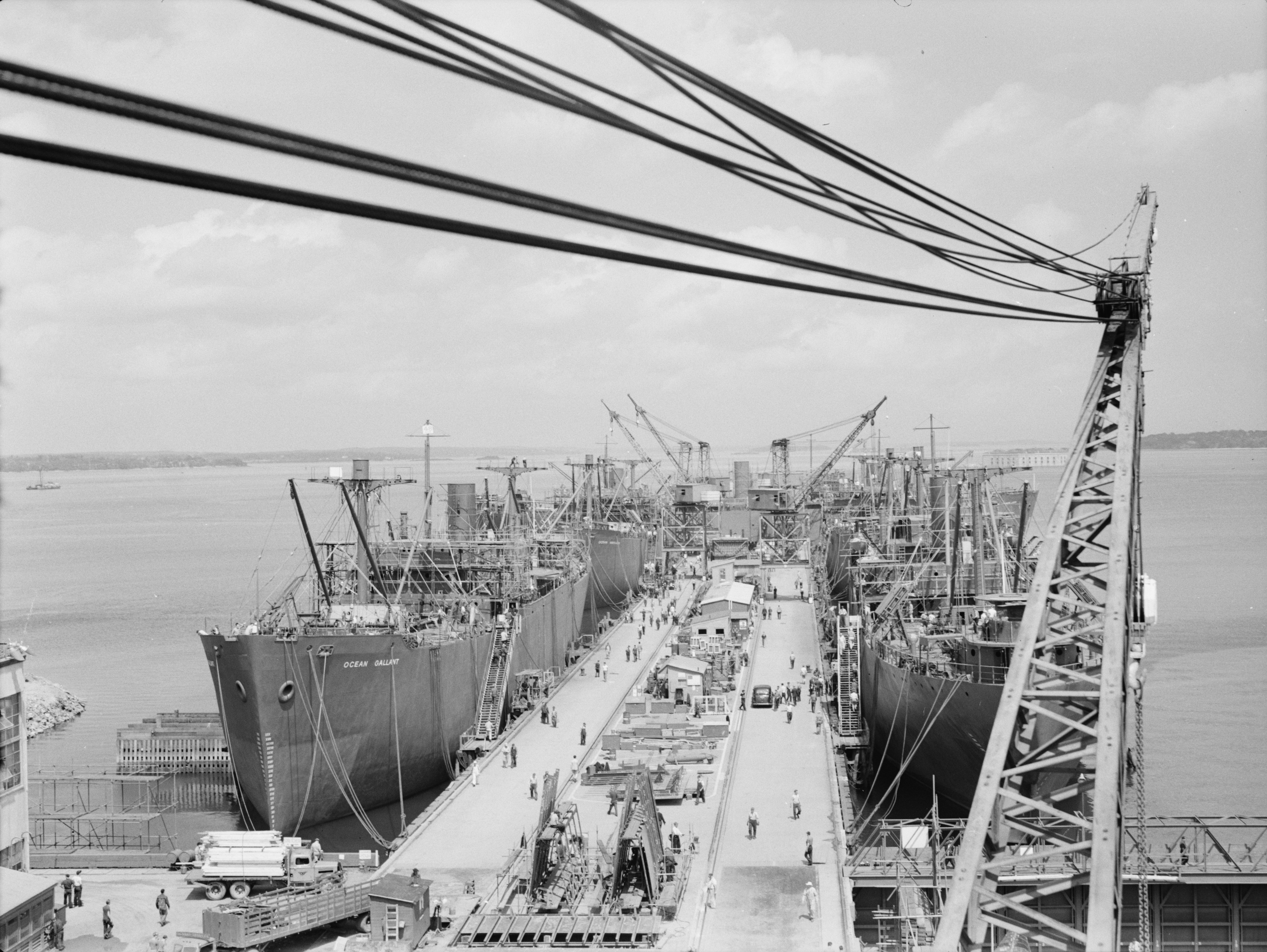
Mass launching of five ships on August 16, 1942

Five of the British Ocean ships, hulls 19–24 Ocean Wayfarer, Ocean Stranger, Ocean Traveller, Ocean Seaman, and Ocean Gallant, were launched along with two destroyers, USS Conway and USS Cony, and the Liberty Ship SS Natasha Allen at a record breaking mass launching on August 16, 1942. The ships were launched and they raced to see which one was the fastest; Natasha Allen won.

At the peak of production, the yards employed 30,000 people.
